= Proposed roads in Sydney =

Proposed road and highway projects in Sydney

Various roads, highways and freeways have been proposed for Sydney, Australia, including substantial inner city expressways until their cancellation in 1977, and more recently arterial road widening projects.

== Current proposals ==
Current road proposals in Sydney include the Alexandria to Moore Park Project, and "seven key road arteries" in Sydney's west.

=== Outer Sydney Orbital ===
The Outer Sydney Orbital is a proposed corridor for a motorway and freight rail line in Western Sydney. The motorway is proposed to be signposted M9 or M10. Sydney Outer Orbital motorway will be connecting Gosford – Western Sydney Airport – Wollongong.

== Under construction roads ==
=== M6 Motorway ===
The M6 Motorway is an under-construction motorway linking the M8 Motorway at Arncliffe to President Avenue at Kogarah.

=== Western Harbour Tunnel ===
The Western Harbour Tunnel is six lane, 6.5-kilometre (4.0 mi) tunnel under construction from Cammeray to Rozelle, passing beneath Sydney Harbour. It is scheduled for completion in 2028.

=== Warringah Freeway Upgrade ===
The Warringah Freeway is being upgraded to accommodate tunnel entries and exists for the Western Harbour Tunnel.

The Sydney Harbour Bridge, Warringah Freeway and Eastern Distributor have been identified as among Australia’s 30 most congested roads.

=== Richmond Road Upgrade ===
In February 2026, construction of the $720 million Richmond Road upgrade began.

The Richmond Road Upgrade includes:

- the $520 million M7 Motorway to Townson Road upgrade
- the $150 million Elara Boulevard to Heritage Road upgrade
- the $50 million Richmond Road Corridor planning project, which will investigate possible road upgrades along the M7 Motorway to The Driftway corridor

== Studies ==
=== Geometric Design Study (De Leuw Cather, 1961) ===
De Leuw Cather undertook one of the first transport plans in Sydney in 1960, and a proposal for Sydney Urban Expressways in 1961.

The study "design year" was 1980. The 1948 network was deemed "adequate" for 1960 traffic demand, but was forecast to only accommodate 45% of 1980 demand as too many routes would converge at Ultimo Interchange.

The engagement of the 1961 DLC report didn't include detailed location or geometric design for the newly proposed portions of the expressway system, however it included an indicative map.

In 1963, the consultants (De Leuw Cather) were continuing their investigations into certain aspects in more detail, in particular for the Warringah Freeway. The consultants were also "investigating a connection between Druitt Street and Ultimo" by 1963 (likely the Western Distributor).

Rod Fraser, Chief County Planner of the Cumberland County Council), wrote a 1964 report criticising the 1961 report. Most copies of the 1964 report were "mysteriously destroyed". Nigel Ashton, reportedly acting on Pat Hills instructions, ordered Mr. Fraser's report to be "pulped". The report was described as "political dynamite". Pat Hills said he had not ordered the "pulping" of the report. Pat Morton, the Minister for Local Government and Highways, said he had not heard of Rod Fraser's report and would make inquiries. The "Civic Roundsman" author in the Daily Telegraph wrote they had "one of the few, if not the only" copy of the printed report.

The report had a note of enthusiasm which "bordered on salesmanship", according to Rod Fraser.

=== Sydney Area Transportation Study (1971) ===
In 1974, the State Planning Authority published Sydney Area Transportation Study (SATS) which proposed a comprehensive expressway and rail system to ease congestion in Sydney.

This study proposed a number of road and expressway proposals.

A 1976 report to the Minister for Transport and Highways and the Minister for Planning and Environment made commentary on the recommendations.

== Historical proposals ==
=== "East-west" expressway ===
The 1961 De Leuw Cather (DLC) Geometric Design Study reproduced the system of future expressways "as first proposed by the Department of Main Roads in 1948", but also proposed a new "east-west" route similar to the 1974 Midwestern Expressway.

The DLC study recommended a revised expressway network in addition to the Department of Main Roads plans, including an "east-west expressway".

The additional 19 miles of expressway in this report - a southern connection between the Warringah Expressway near St. Leonards, and the Southern Expressway near Mascot, and the direct link between the Western Expressway at Haberfield and the Eastern Suburbs Expressway at Paddington) - were new. The Cumberland County Council estimated these plans for an additional 19 miles would "alienate 1,000 acres of land" and displace around 20,000 people.

The revised system included an interchange at the approximate site of the Rozelle Interchange, and an interchange at the approximate location of Enmore Road / Stanmore Road / Edgeware Road. The unbuilt east-west expressway was proposed from approximately Victoria Road at Darling Street, intersecting with the Western Expressway west of Haberfield (approximately at the present day Wattle Street Offramp of the M4), through the new interchange (approximately Enmore Road / Stanmore road / Edgeware Road), intersecting the Southern Expressway east of the current Sydney Park Road and Euston Road intersection, crossing the Green Square station intersection, crossing the intersection at Alison Road and Anzac Parade (the location of the proposed continuous-flow intersection in the ultimate concept design of the Alexandria to Moore Park Project), and approximately following Lang Road terminating at Syd Einfield Drive. (Note: Map titled "Revised Study Network".)

In 1965 the UNSW Professor of Highway Engineering D.F. Orchard wrote an article and reproduced an image of the proposed "east-west expressway". He claimed an east-west city bypass was important after the Western Distributor and Eastern Suburbs Railway was constructed. He claimed the cure to traffic was to create new road capacity to a level so that induced demand would not cause saturation, while also acknowledging traffic is self-adjusting. He claimed one of the major objects of town planning is to distribute land use so that no single road (or intersection) will carry excessive traffic and criticised opposition to one-way pair roads.

=== Midwestern Highway ===
SATS recommended the development of the Midwestern Highway, described as a "major artery" including a segment from Alexandria to Anzac Parade. It was to connect from the Johnston's Creek Route to Anzac Parade with 4 through lanes of expressway standard. It was suggested this section be implemented from 1991 to 2000. Roads recommended in the general location for this route included Erskineville Road, Swanson, Copeland, Fountain, McEvoy and Lachlan Streets and Dacey Avenue.

A 1977 paper by D. Chesterman & M.B Colson detailed alternate expressway and arterial routes, including a possible alignment along the Midwestern Highway route in some options. (Note: These authors also authored a May 1976 report detailing alternatives)

The Johnston's Creek to Kensington section of the highway was to be 2.99 miles in length and estimated to cost $23.9 million between 1991 and 2000.

It was planned to intersect with the Southern Freeway (Expressway).

In 1987, Laurie Brereton announced the Department of Main Roads abandoned a number of proposed freeways, link roads and road widenings. This included the abandoning of land which this highway would have required. The planning scheme reservation between the junction of King St and Church St and junction of Erskineville Rd and Union St was abandoned, along with the planning scheme reservation west of the railway line, and the re-alignment scheme on Erskineville Rd between King St and the railway (Newtown County Road). The planning scheme reservation between Anzac Parade and Oxford St via Martin Rd and Lang Rd was also abandoned (Moore Park County Road).

=== Johnstons Creek Route ===
The Johnstons Creek route is an unbuilt arterial route proposal from mascot and Annandale, which follows Johnstons Creek along part of the alignment. There is "precious little literature" on the route proposals. The WestConnex plans for the widened Campbell Street bridge over the canal to Alexandria used part of the Johnstons Creek Route corridor.

=== Beaches Link ===
The Beaches Link was a proposed underground motorway scheme in Sydney, New South Wales, Australia. It was proposed to consist of a series of motorway tunnels running north-south between Burnt Bridge Creek Deviation at Balgowlah and the Warringah Freeway at Cammeray, providing direct access from the Northern Beaches to the Sydney central business district.

=== Wolli Creek Freeway ===
A freeway was originally proposed along Wolli Creek, known as the Wolli Creek Freeway, F5 Freeway or South Western Motorway. The current M5 Motorway takes a similar corridor, though underground.

The F5 / South Western Freeway was included in the County of Cumberland planning scheme.

The RTA modified the subconsultants reports for the freeway's EIS, and the Wolli Creek Preservation Society recommended in their submission that legal proceedings should result in the EIS Editors.

NSW Premier Neville Wran announcing a commission of inquiry. While attending the opera, he bumped into a young barrister named David Kirby, and requested he undertake the inquiry. This report contributed to the end of the freeway.
