= A8 (Sydney) =

Road in New South Wales, Australia

A8 (numerous constituent roads) New South Wales

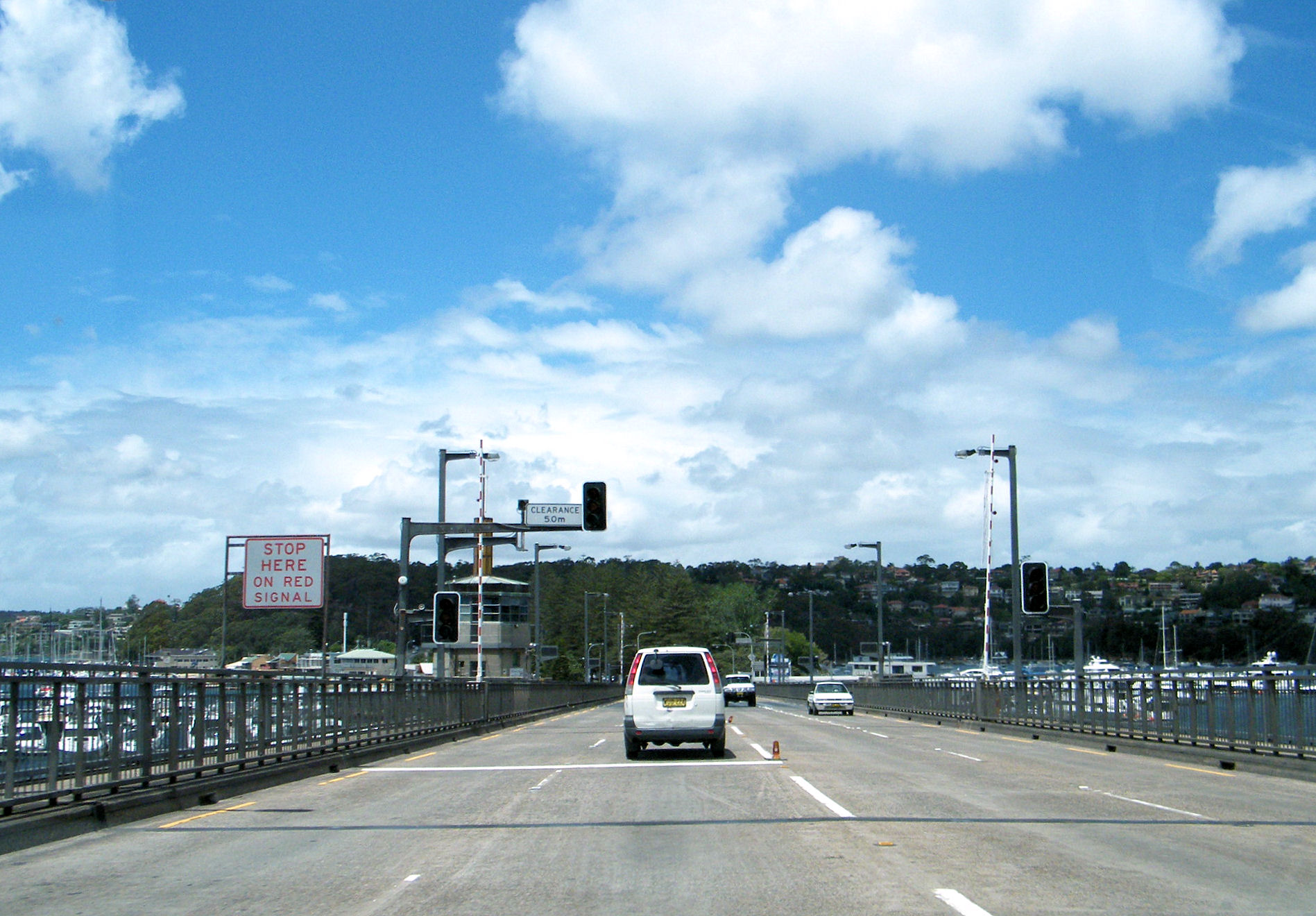
- Driving southbound over the Spit Bridge
- Coordinates: 33.679337°S 151.302740°E (Northeast end); 33.829736°S 151.213872°E (Southwest end)

General information
- Type: Road
- Length: 22.8 km (14 mi)
- Gazetted: August 1928
- Route number(s): A8 (2013–present)
- Former route number: Metroad 10 (1998–2013); State Route 14 (1974–1998)

Major junctions
- Northeast end: Pittwater Road; Mona Vale, Sydney
- Mona Vale Road; Wakehurst Parkway; Warringah Road; Sydney Road; Military Road; Warringah Freeway
- Southwest end: Falcon Street; North Sydney

Location(s)
- Major suburbs: Narrabeen, Collaroy, Dee Why, Brookvale, Balgowlah, Seaforth, Mosman, Cremorne

Highway system
- Highways in Australia; National Highway • Freeways in Australia; Highways in New South Wales

The A8 is a route designation of a major metropolitan arterial route through suburban north-eastern Sydney. This name covers a few consecutive roads and is widely known to most drivers, but the entire allocation is also known – and signposted – by the names of its constituent parts: Pittwater Road, Condamine Street, Burnt Bridge Creek Deviation, Manly Road, Spit Road and Military Road.

The A8 is a major transport link through the Northern Beaches district of Sydney, forming one of only three road connections between the Northern Beaches area and the rest of Sydney (the others being routes A3 and A38). The crossing of Middle Harbour over the Spit Bridge has become infamous as one of the most congested road links in the city, compounded by the regular opening of the bridge to allow boats to pass by.

== Route ==
The A8 commences at the intersection Pittwater Road and Mona Vale Road at Mona Vale and heads in a southerly direction at Pittwater Road as a four-lane, dual-carriageway road (with additional bus lanes in both directions) through Narrabeen and Dee Why, changing to Condamine Street at North Manly, then changing again to Burnt Bridge Creek Deviation and heading west, bypassing Balgowlah. It changes name to Manly Road at the intersection with Sydney Road and continues in a southwesterly direction, changing name again to Spit Road just before crossing Middle Harbour over the Spit Bridge, widening to a six-lane, dual-carriageway road and continuing south, until it intersects with and changes name to Military Road in Mosman, heading west until it eventually terminates at the interchange with Warringah Freeway at North Sydney.

The A8 was planned to eventually connect with M8 Motorway in the Inner West via the Beaches Link, Western Harbour Tunnel, M4–M5 Link, and Rozelle Interchange, however in June 2022, the NSW Government announced that the Beaches Link section of the project would be shelved indefinitely, due to market constraints and labour shortages.

== History ==
Most of the components of the route are old roads. The section of Military Road through Cremorne and Mosman was first built in the 1820s. The earliest bridge at The Spit, linking Mosman to Manly, opened in 1923, and was then rebuilt in the late 1950s with new, wider, approach roads on the southern (Spit Road) and northern sides (Manly Road) of the bridge.

The passing of the Main Roads Act of 1924 through the Parliament of New South Wales provided for the declaration of Main Roads, roads partially funded by the State government through the Main Roads Board (MRB). Main Road No. 164 was declared along this road on 8 August 1928, from the intersection of Great Northern Highway (today Pacific Highway) and Mount Street in North Sydney, then along Miller and Falcon Streets and Military Road via Cremorne, Balgowah, Dee Why and Narrabeen to Mona Vale (and continuing northwards to Newport); with the passing of the Main Roads (Amendment) Act of 1929 to provide for additional declarations of State Highways and Trunk Roads, this was amended to Main Road 164 on 8 April 1929.

Main Road 164 was officially named Pittwater Road, between Mona Vale Road in Mona Vale and Condamine Street in North Manly (and continuing northwards to Church Point, and southwards to Raglan Street in Manly), on 10 January 1951.

The Burnt Bridge Creek Deviation opened in 1985 to bypass the congested Balgowlah shopping strip, offering 3 kilometres of freeway-standard motoring. The western end of Main Road 164 through North Sydney was re-aligned from Miller Street, to Falcon Street and its intersection with Pacific Highway in Crows Nest, on 22 January 1993.

The passing of the Roads Act of 1993 updated road classifications and the way they could be declared within New South Wales. Under this act, the A8 retains its declaration as part of Main Road 164.

The route was signed State Route 14 across its entire length (and continuing north along Barrenjoey Road to Palm Beach) in 1974. The whole route was re-designated Metroad 10 in 1998, between North Sydney and Mona Vale. Traffic headed south-east on Warringah Freeway originally had no ability to exit the freeway to enter Falcon Street, so the original Metroad 10 route was extended further west via Pacific Highway to meet Gore Hill Freeway at Artarmon. When north-facing, tolled off-ramps were constructed directly connecting Warringah Freeway to Falcon Street in 2007, Metroad 10 route was truncated to Falcon Street's interchange with Warringah Freeway. With the conversion to the newer alphanumeric system in 2013, Metroad 10 was replaced by route A8.

== Major intersections ==
| LGA | Location | km | mi | Destinations | Notes |
|---|---|---|---|---|---|
| Northern Beaches | Mona Vale | 0.0 | 0.0 | Pittwater Road (north) – Church Point to Barrenjoey Road – Newport, Palm Beach | Northeastern terminus of route A8; Northern end of Pittwater Road |
| Northern Beaches | Mona Vale | 0.0 | 0.0 | Mona Vale Road (A3) – Terrey Hills, Ryde, Blakehurst | |
| Northern Beaches | North Narrabeen | 3.6 | 2.2 | Wakehurst Parkway – Frenchs Forest, Seaforth | |
| Northern Beaches | Dee Why | 10.4 | 6.5 | Warringah Road (A38 west) – Frenchs Forest, Chatswood, North Ryde; Harbord Road (south) – Freshwater | |
| Northern Beaches | Brookvale–North Manly boundary | 12.1 | 7.5 | Pittwater Road (south) – North Manly, Manly | Southern end of Pittwater Road; Northern end of Condamine Street |
| Northern Beaches | Manly Vale–Balgowlah boundary | 14.5 | 9.0 | Condamine Street (south) – Balgowlah | Southern end of Condamine Street; Eastern end of Burnt Bridge Creek Deviation |
| Northern Beaches | Seaforth–Balgowlah boundary | 16.2 | 10.1 | Sydney Road – Seaforth, Balgowlah | Western end of Burnt Bridge Creek Deviation; Northern end of Manly Road |
| Middle Harbour | | 17.3 | 10.7 | Spit Bridge | |
| Mosman | Spit Junction | 20.0 | 12.4 | Military Road (east) – Mosman | Southern end of Manly Road; Eastern end of Military Road |
| North Sydney | Cammeray–North Sydney boundary | 22.8 | 14.2 | Warringah Freeway (M1) – Artarmon, Sydney CBD | |
| North Sydney | Cammeray–North Sydney boundary | 22.8 | 14.2 | Falcon Street (west) – Crows Nest | Southwestern terminus of route A8; Western end of Military Road |
Route transition

=== Military Road E-Ramp ===
A toll is charged when entering or exiting Warringah Freeway (north) to and from the A8 via the tolled E-ramps. Known as the Military Road E-ramps and previously the Falcon Street Gateway, they were opened in 2007 and operated by Connector Motorways until 2010. They are now operated by Transurban under a toll concession until 2048.

Toll prices as of 1 July 2025
| Toll road | Class A toll prices (Note: Class A vehicles are typically cars and motorcycles; Class B vehicles are all other vehicles including trucks and heavy vehicles.) | Class B toll prices | Toll increase | Toll concessionaire | Expiry of toll concession |
|---|---|---|---|---|---|
| Military Road E-Ramp (to / from Warringah Freeway) | $2.07 | $7.13 | Quarterly on 1 January, 1 April, 1 July, and 1 October, by the greater of quarterly CPI or 1% | Transurban | June 2048 |
