= Beaches Link =

Canceled road tunnel project in New South Wales, Australia

Beaches Link New South Wales

General information
- Type: Motorway (Proposed)
- Length: 9.2 km (5.7 mi)

Major junctions
- North end: Burnt Bridge Creek Deviation; Balgowlah, Sydney
- Wakehurst Parkway; Seaforth, Sydney; Gore Hill Freeway; Artarmon, Sydney
- South end: Warringah Freeway; Cammeray, Sydney

Location(s)
- Major suburbs / towns: Balgowlah, Seaforth, Northbridge, Willoughby, Naremburn

Highway system
- Highways in Australia; National Highway • Freeways in Australia; Highways in New South Wales

The Beaches Link was a proposed underground motorway scheme in Sydney, New South Wales, Australia. It was proposed to consist of a series of motorway tunnels running north-south between Burnt Bridge Creek Deviation at Balgowlah and the Warringah Freeway at Cammeray, providing direct access from the Northern Beaches to the Sydney central business district.

== Design ==
The Beaches Link would consist of two branches, the main branch starting from Burnt Bridge Creek Deviation at Balgowlah and the second branch starting from Wakehurst Parkway at Seaforth. Both branches would have joined at Seaforth, and the tunnel crossed Middle Harbour to Northbridge to the west of the current main crossing, the Spit Bridge. From Northbridge, it would have connected with Gore Hill Freeway and Warringah Freeway at its southern end.

A new connection road would be built at Balgowlah linking between Burnt Bridge Creek Deviation, the Beaches Link tunnel entrance and exit, and Sydney Road. The road would divide the former Balgowlah Golf Club grounds. The Beaches Link would follow abandoned extensions of the Warringah Freeway in the 1960s and 1970s and bypasses the heavily congested Spit Bridge.

== History ==
The project was first announced in December 2020 by the Berejiklian government as a single project with the Western Harbour Tunnel. In June 2022, the Perrottet government announced that the project would be shelved indefinitely, due to budgetary constraints and labour shortages. Following a change of government, the project was cancelled by the Minns government in September 2023. However, Transport for NSW will retain ownership of acquired properties and the construction of stub tunnels at the Western Harbour Tunnel portals in Cammeray reserve a future connection to Beaches Link, should it be built by a future government.

In 2026, the release of a major review of road corridors (the Northern Beaches Network Review) prompted independent state MP for Wakehurst Michael Regan to call for the Beaches Link motorway tunnel to be revived. Minister for roads Jenny Aitchison did not rule out the project. She stated the government was "focused on improving road traffic flows and bus services across the northern beaches" and was considering bus priority lanes and intersection upgrades.
