= Spit Bridge =

Bridge in Sydney, New South Wales, Australia

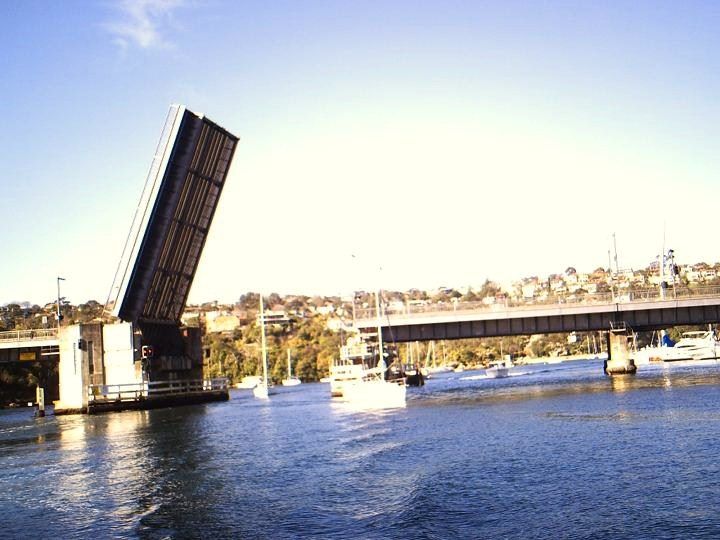
- The Spit Bridge with its bascule deck opened
- Coordinates: 33°48′09″S 151°14′46″E
- Carries: The Spit Road: Motor vehicles; Grade-separated shared pedestrian footpath and cycleway
- Crosses: Middle Harbour
- Locale: The Spit, Mosman, New South Wales, Australia
- Begins: Mosman (south)
- Ends: Seaforth (north)
- Owner: Transport for NSW
- Heritage status: Roads & Maritime Services heritage and conservation register
- Preceded by: Roseville Bridge

Characteristics
- Design: Girder bridge with a bascule lift span
- Material: Steel and concrete
- Trough construction: Composite concrete
- Total length: 745 feet 6 inches (227.23 m)
- Width: 54 feet (16 m)
- No. of spans: 7
- No. of lanes: 4

History
- Designer: NSW Department of Main Roads
- Constructed by: Cleveland Bridge & Engineering Company
- Construction start: 1952
- Construction end: 1958
- Construction cost: A£1,110,000
- Opened: 19 November 1958
- Replaces: The Spit Bridge (1924–1958)

Statistics
- Daily traffic: ~33,000 (2012)

Location
- Interactive map of Spit Bridge

The Spit Bridge is a steel and concrete girder bridge with a bascule lift span across Middle Harbour (an arm of Sydney Harbour), the bridge is located 10 kilometres (6.2 mi) north-east of the central business district in Sydney, New South Wales, Australia. It is named after The Spit, a sand peninsula extending into Middle Harbour from its southern bank. The bridge connects Spit Road in Mosman, on the south bank to Manly Road in Seaforth, on the north bank, and is part of NSW state route A8 (Sydney).

== History ==
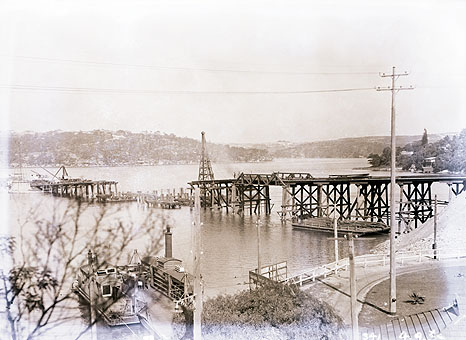
Construction of the (first) Spit Bridge in 1924. The punt may be seen in bottom left foreground.

Sydney's Lower North Shore and Northern Beaches were connected initially by a rowing boat from as early as 1829. A hand-operated punt service began in 1850 and continued until 1889, when it was replaced by a steam punt.

The inhabitants of the Manly area first requested a bridge in the 1870s and the first plans for one were made in the following decade. In 1912, Member of Parliament Richard Arthur lobbied the State Government to build a bridge, but was told that the planned construction of the Sydney Harbour Bridge made this unlikely. World War I pushed the issue aside but more calls for a bridge were made in 1919.

In 1922, the cost of a bridge was estimated at £150,000 by the Public Works Committee, a price that Manly Council said would cover a 205-metre-long concrete bridge, resting on 18 arches of varying lengths, with two sets of tram lines, two roadways and two footpaths. Eventually, in late 1923, the Council decided to build a bridge itself at a cost of £40,000 to £60,000 with a low height design made from timber that was 213 m long, with a roadway 5.5 m wide and room for one covered footpath, but no tram lines.

In 1924, the (first) Spit Bridge was completed and opened. By 1927 the timber low–level bridge saw a 60% growth in use over that of the punt for the year prior to the bridge opening. The amount of traffic using the bridge was higher than expected and the subsequent revenue from tolls providing a financial boon for the government.

Various plans were considered to reduce congestion including a high-level bridge and a bridge further upstream, leaving the existing bridge for local traffic; however none were enacted until after World War II. The NSW Government decided to build another low-level bridge at the same site.

== Description ==
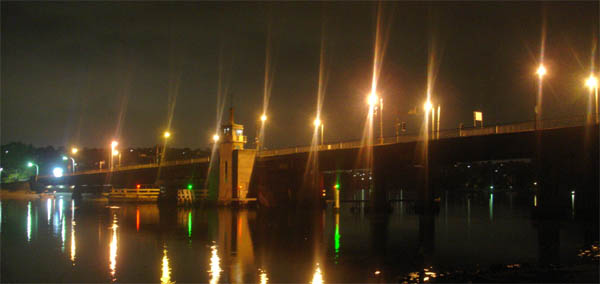
The Spit Bridge from Ellery's Punt Reserve.

Construction of the current bridge by Cleveland Bridge & Engineering Company of Middlesbrough (UK) commenced in 1952 and after delays due to a shortage of steel, was completed in 1958; and opened on 19 November 1958.

The Spit Bridge over Middle Harbour is a steel and concrete girder bridge with a bascule lift span. It comprises 7 spans with a total length of 227.2 m, has four traffic lanes with a carriageway width of 13 m and a pedestrian walkway of 1.5 m on each side. There are three fixed spans either side of the opening span. Each of the six fixed spans have four welded plate girders as the main members, with cross girders, but without stringers or horizontal bracing. The concrete deck is dowelled to the steelwork. The opening span (span 4) is a single-leaf bascule. It has two main girders, with cross girders and stringers, covered by an open mesh steel deck.

The two footways are of concrete on the fixed spans, and steel on the bascule span. The piers either side of the opening span are flanked by fenders, and when the bridge is in the open position a navigation channel of 24 m wide is created. At the Mosman end the slab and two column piers rest on concrete piles driven into the sands of the harbour bed at a depth of between 12 m and 15 m. At the Manly end the harbour bottom slopes up steeply to outcropping rock on which the northern abutment sits. Piers 5 and 6 are double cylinder piers sitting on bedrock below the harbour bed. The main pier which supports the bascule span is Pier 4. It rests on four cylinders taken down to sandstone bedrock at a depth of between 14 m and 23 m, which is 23 m and 32 m below mean sea level. The pier is box-like and supports all machinery for the operation of the bascule, including the operator's cabin.

The approaches and abutments at each end are different, due to the nature of the topography. The southern abutment is built up from the sandy beach level and has a retaining wall faced with stone on either side. The northern abutment is resting directly on the rock on the western side and is built up on the eastern side with a retaining wall. Due to the difference in ground level between the two shores, there is a grade of 2.68% rising from south to north.

In order to stop traffic for the bridge to open, traffic is regulated by traffic lights and boomgates placed one span length before the bascule span from either direction.

The bridge carries four traffic lanes, with two lanes in each direction at most times, and a tidal flow system during peak hours to give a one/three configuration. The approach roads have three lanes in each direction. In 2007, the Roads & Traffic Authority found that traffic either side of the bridge doesn't return to normal for 15 minutes after the bridge is opened and consequently reduced the number of bridge opening times.

Shared pedestrian footpaths and cycleways are located along both sides of the bridge.

In conjunction with the construction of the bridge, Manly Road (the northern approach road) was built, replacing a complicated one-way system whereby northbound traffic from Spit Bridge was routed via Edgecliffe Boulevarde, Palmerston Place and Ponsonby Parade to reach the former route of Sydney Road near what is now Magarra Place (formerly part of Heaton Ave), and southbound traffic travelled via the former route of Sydney Road (part of which is now Magarra Place, part subsumed into the route of Manly Road and part of which is now Avona Cres). The Manly-The Spit tram line followed a third route, from Sydney Road south along Whittle Ave then via a circuitous tramway reservation (now Kanangra Ave) across the southern end of Heaton Ave then below Sydney Road to arrive at its terminus immediately east of the northern end of Spit Bridge (this line closed in 1939 and therefore did not need to be accommodated in the new 1958 northern approach to the bridge).

The Cleveland Bridge & Engineering Company also built the Liverpool Bridge, also in Sydney, concurrently with the Spit Bridge, to a similar design (although it does not have an opening span) and it also was completed in 1958.

== Heritage listing ==
The Spit Bridge was listed on the Roads & Traffic Authority heritage and conservation register on 24 November 2003:

== Congestion and bypassing projects ==
The Spit Bridge forms part of the route from the Sydney central business district and Lower North Shore to Manly and the Northern Beaches. The next crossing of Middle Harbour is some distance upstream (north-west) at Roseville Bridge, and there is no crossing further down Middle Harbour. Traffic delays either side of The Spit Bridge have been a problem for many years, not only on the approaches to the bridge itself, but also far up the hills on either side.

Proposals to ameliorate delays have included widening the bridge, a tunnel linking the Warringah Expressway and the Burnt Bridge Creek Deviation, and a high-level bridge in place of the existing one.

David Barr, the member for Manly, claimed in 2002 that the latter two were too expensive, with a $200 million estimated cost for a high-level bridge, and $1 billion for the tunnel proposal.

The Roads & Traffic Authority announced in August 2006 that tenders had been called for widening of the bridge to six lanes, with two extra traffic lanes and a pedestrian/cycleway being added on the western side, and upgrades to the lifting mechanism. Construction was to have begun in 2007, however, the project was scrapped in May of that year. According to the Government this was due to technical and engineering difficulties; according to the Opposition it was because of political considerations. The increased cost estimate to $115 million were deemed to be not justifiable by the Minister for Roads Eric Roozendaal and the five–year plan was abandoned.

In 2009 it was reported that the NSW Labor Government was reviewing a proposal for a tunnel from Cammeray to The Spit, linked to a new, higher bridge that would not require opening to let boats pass.

In 2014, NSW Premier Mike Baird, who was also the member for Manly (having replaced David Barr), announced plans to bypass Mosman and the Spit Bridge by constructing a $2–3 billion tunnel from Seaforth to Neutral Bay that would run beneath Military Road.

In 2017, NSW Premier Gladys Berejiklian announced that the NSW Government would provide $77 million towards the construction of a tunnel to bypass the Spit Bridge as part of the Beaches Link project. The tunnel, which was expected to take five years to build, would have connected the Warringah Freeway from Cammeray and cross underneath Middle Harbour to meet up with the Burnt Bridge Creek deviation at Balgowlah. The proposed tunnel was to have been located west of The Spit Bridge.

However, in June 2022, the NSW Government announced that this project would be shelved indefinitely due to market constraints and labour shortages.

== See also ==
- List of bridges in Sydney
