= Sydney Harbour Tunnel =

Motorway tunnel in Sydney, New South Wales, Australia

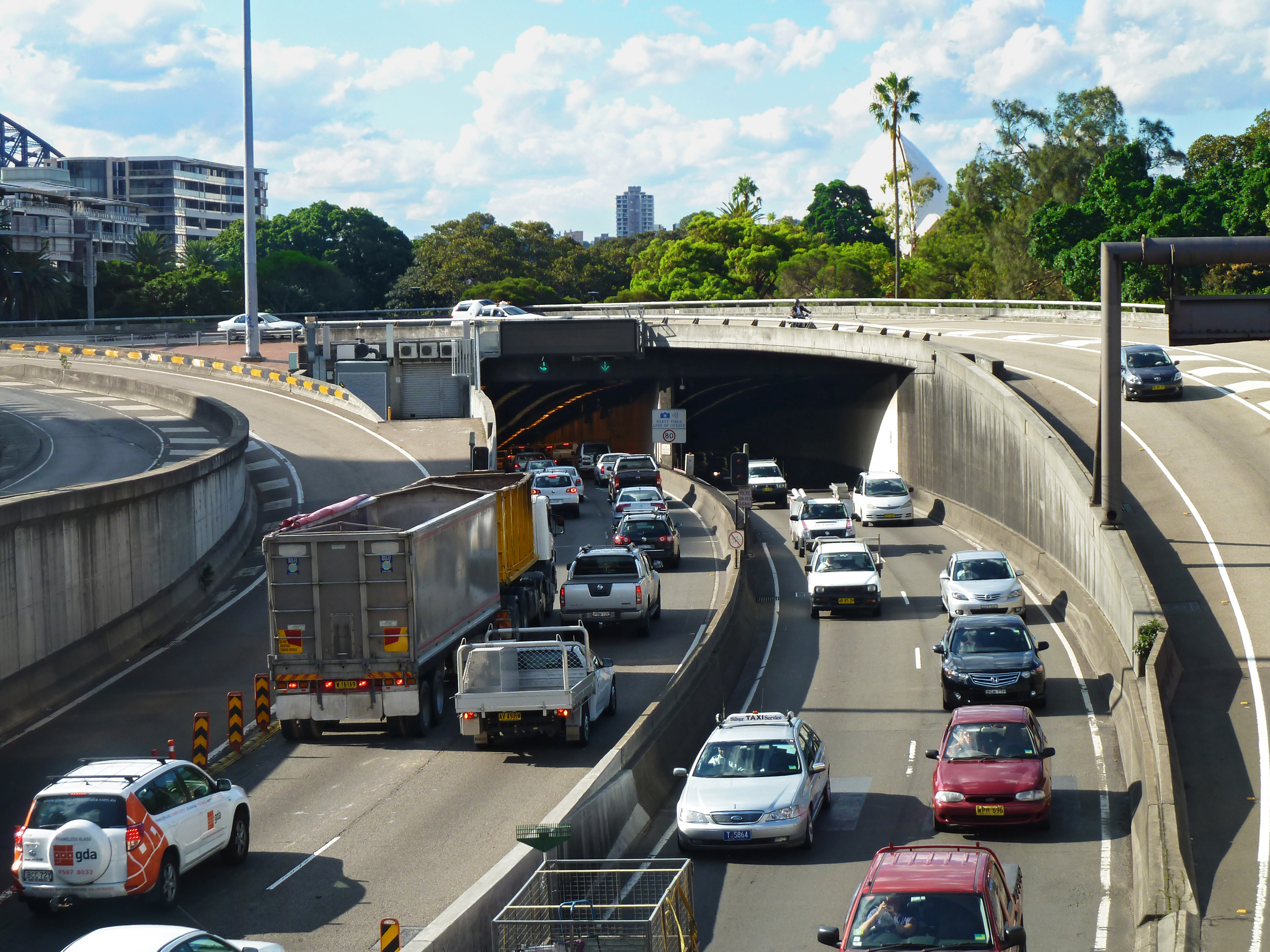
- Southern end of the Sydney Harbour Tunnel, showing the northbound entry (L) and southbound exit (R)
- Interactive map of Sydney Harbour Tunnel

Overview
- Location: Port Jackson
- Coordinates: 33.85260°S 151.21187°E
- Status: Active
- Start: Warringah Freeway
- End: Cahill Expressway

Operation
- Work began: February 1988
- Opened: 30 August 1992
- Owner: NSW Motorways
- Operator: Ventia
- Traffic: Automotive
- Toll: Time of day tolling (southbound only)
- Vehicles per day: 96,000 (2017)

Technical
- Length: 2.8 km (1.7 mi)
- No. of lanes: 4
- Operating speed: 80 km/h (50 mph)
- Tunnel clearance: 4.4 m (14 ft 5 in) vehicle clearance,
- Width: 10.5 m (34 ft 5 in)
- Depth below water: 25 metres (82 ft)
- Shipping clearance above: 16 m (52 ft)

The Sydney Harbour Tunnel is a twin-tube road tunnel in Sydney, New South Wales, Australia. The tunnel was completed and opened to traffic in August 1992 to provide a second vehicular crossing of Sydney Harbour to alleviate congestion on the Sydney Harbour Bridge. It is one of two transportation tunnels under the harbour, the other being twin rail tunnels used by Sydney Metro.

The tunnel joins the Warringah Freeway at North Sydney and the Cahill Expressway at the entrance to the Domain Tunnel. It has two lanes in each direction, and runs at an angle of approximately thirty degrees (north to south) to the Sydney Harbour Bridge, which has eight lanes, with a tidal flow operation. In 2017, the tunnel was carrying around 96,000 vehicles per day.

== Construction ==
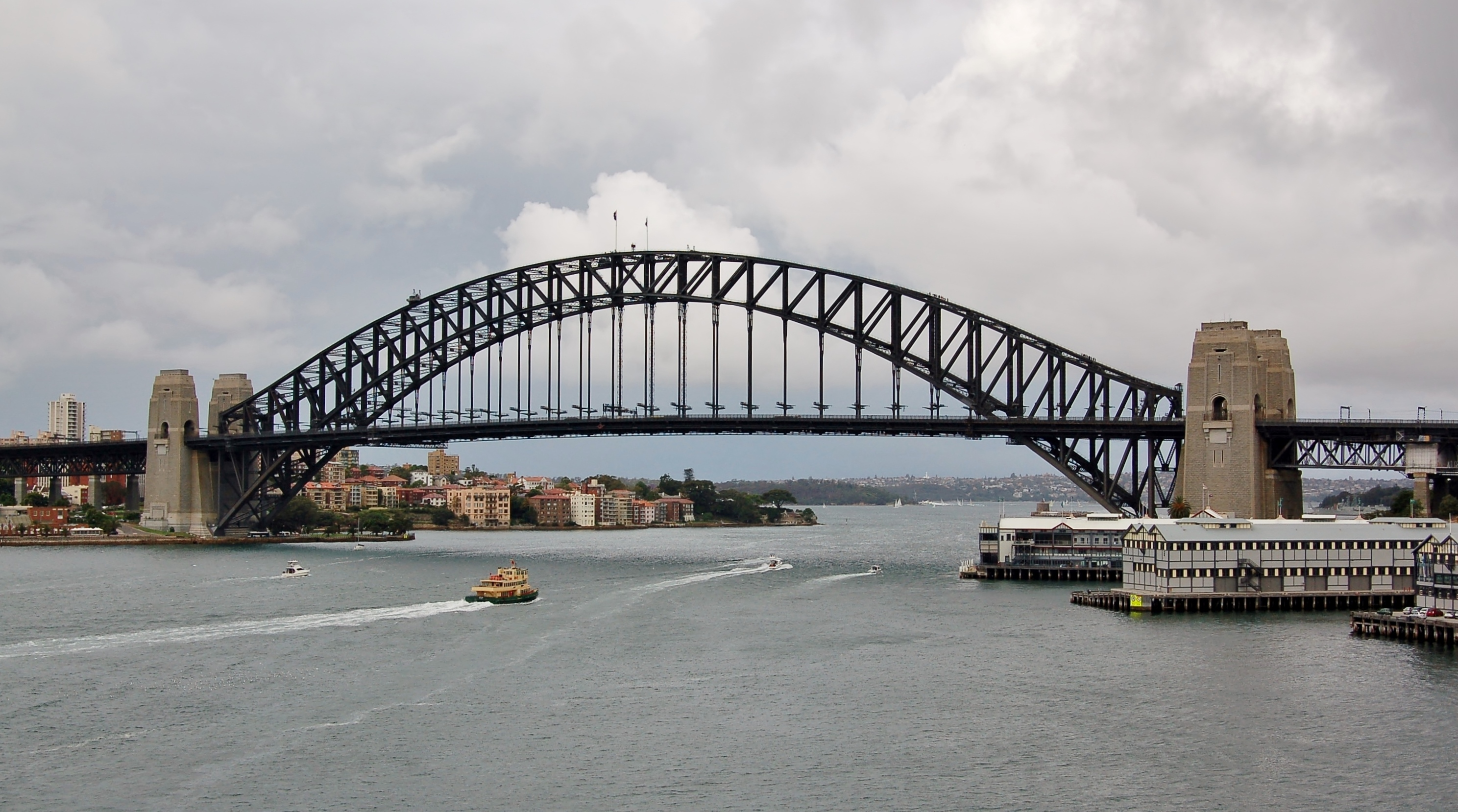
Alterations to the northern end pylons of the Harbour Bridge were required to build the tunnel.

The tunnel is made up of three sections: twin 900-metre (3,000 ft) land tunnels on the north shore, twin 400-metre (1,300 ft) land tunnels on the south shore and a 960-metre (3,150 ft) immersed tube (IMT) structure. The tunnel falls about 55 metres (180 ft) from the northern entrance and about 35 metres (115 ft) from the southern entrance to its deepest point, 25 metres (82 ft) below sea level. The construction was undertaken by Thiess Contractors.

The IMT structure consists of eight precast concrete units. The units were constructed over 100 kilometres (62 mi) away in a casting basin at Port Kembla and then towed to Sydney Harbour. A trench was dredged before the arrival of the IMTs and then the IMTs were lowered into the trench by a system of pontoons and control towers. After the IMTs were in place, the trenches were backfilled and then a rock armour was placed over the top to protect the units against marine hazards, such as anchors or sinking vessels. The land tunnels were constructed by a combination of driving and cut-and-cover techniques, designed to be strong enough to withstand the impact of earthquakes.

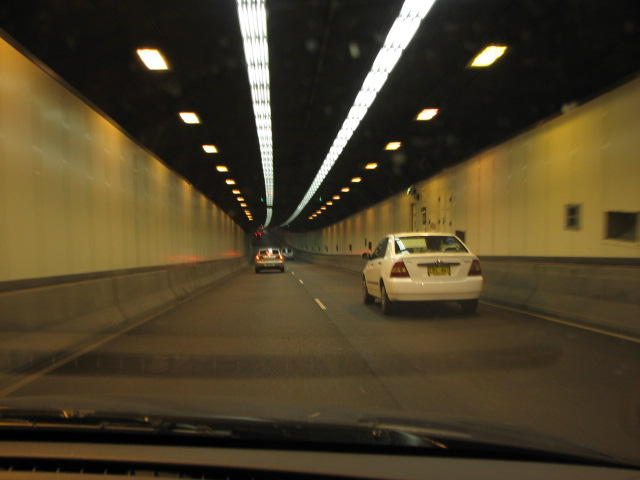
Interior, heading northbound

=== Ventilation ===
The northern end pylons of the Sydney Harbour Bridge were altered to allow for air exhaust from the tunnel to rise over the harbour. Bradfield Park on the northern side of the bridge also has air intakes. Fresh air is drawn by an underground ventilation station on the north shore and is pumped to all sections of the tunnel through vented ducts. The air supply uses fourteen axial flow fans, each up to 2.5 metres (8 ft 2 in) in diameter. The exhaust uses sixteen (eight in each northern pylon tower) fans that draw exhaust air through two underground ducts from the tunnel ventilation station and transfer the air to the top of the pylon. They can expel it at up to 1,500 m^{3}/s (53,000 cu ft/s) – equivalent to changing all the air in the tunnel every two minutes with the capability of running in reverse in an emergency and all fans are rated for smoke extraction. Each of the fans has a duty of 53 to 103 m^{3}/s (1,900 to 3,600 cu ft/s). The testing of the fans was one of the most comprehensive ever, covering flowrate and pressure, power measurements, sound levels, bearing vibration, x-raying of all impeller components, high-temperature tests at 200 °C (392 °F) for two hours, impeller strain, and 24-hour run tests for reversals.

== Operations and maintenance ==
The Harbour Tunnel was a partnership between the New South Wales government and private investors by tender. Transfield and Kumagai Gumi formed a 50/50 joint venture company which constructed the tunnel under contract; with a 30-year operating contract, including revenue collection and maintenance, from 1992 until 2022. As a result of the 1997 separation of assets of Transfield and the creation of the Tenix group (owned by Olbia), the ongoing 30-year operating contract for management of the tunnel was split between Kumagai Gumi (50%), Transfield (25%) and Olbia (25%).

The total construction cost of the project was $554 million. $223 million of this was an interest-free loan from the NSW Government, to be repaid at the conclusion of the operating contract in August 2022 when the tunnel would be transferred to public ownership. The government had also guaranteed an Ensured Revenue Stream (ERS) to the operator, whereby it makes up the shortfall between toll collections and the guaranteed amount. As toll revenues have been below the projected amount, in 2008 for example, the government paid the operator $58.9 million, with the total amount forecast to be $1.1 billion from 2008 to 2022. The NSW Auditor-General had also raised concerns that the tunnel's expenses may make the operating company default on the $223 million loan, however the government remained confident in it.

With the 30-year operating contract about to expire, in April 2022, the state government signed a 15-year contract with Ventia for the asset management, operations and maintenance of the Sydney Harbour Tunnel as well as the under-construction Western Harbour Tunnel. Tolling arrangements were unrelated to the new agreement. On 1 September 2022, the tunnel reverted back to state government ownership.

The Sydney Harbour Tunnel is currently owned by the state government through NSW Motorways.

== Tolls ==
In 2006 the New South Wales government announced that all cash tolls on the Sydney Orbital Network would cease by 2010. The Sydney Harbour Tunnel went fully electronic in July 2007 with both e-TAG and e-pass video tolling arrangements in use, similar to technologies used by the Westlink M7, Cross City Tunnel and the Lane Cove Tunnel. This measure has substantially eased the traffic jams heading towards the electronic gantries, and providing increased convenience and time savings. The Sydney Harbour Tunnel attracts a varying toll (that was introduced in 2009) of between $2.50 and $4.00, depending on the time of day. The toll is levied on the southbound approach to the tunnel entrance.

Until July 2022 it was unannounced whether tolls would continue after the transfer of ownership to the state government on 1 September 2022. It was eventually announced by the state government that the toll would continue, to be used for maintenance just like the Sydney Harbour Bridge. Along with the Bridge, tolls for the Tunnel rose in October 2023 for the first time in 14 years.

== Exits and interchanges ==
LGA	Location	km	mi	Destinations	Notes
North Sydney Council	North Sydney	0.0	0.0	Warringah Freeway (M1) Newcastle, Brisbane	Northern end of tunnel
Port Jackson				Sydney Harbour Tunnel	
City of Sydney	Sydney	2.8	1.7	Cahill Expressway (M1) Sydney Airport, Wollongong, Canberra	Southern end of tunnel
1.000 mi = 1.609 km; 1.000 km = 0.621 mi

== History ==
The tunnel was opened to the public to walk through from North Sydney (Falcon Street) to Eastern Sydney (the Domain) on 30 August 1992. The proceeds of the tickets sold for this event were donated to the Royal Institute for Deaf and Blind Children.

The tunnel opened to traffic on 31 August 1992.
