= NSW Motorways =

Asset holding entity in New South Wales, Australia

Agency overview
- Formed: 1 July 2025
- Jurisdiction: New South Wales, Australia
- Minister responsible: John Graham, Minister for Transport
- Agency executive: Camilla Drover, Acting chief executive officer
- Parent agency: Transport for NSW
- Key document: Transport Administration Act 1988 (NSW) Part 3E, Act 109 of 1988
- Website: www.nsw.gov.au/departments-and-agencies/nsw-motorways

NSW Motorways is an agency of the New South Wales state government in Australia, under Transport for NSW. It was established to improve outcomes for motorists in New South Wales.

== History ==
Before NSW Motorways there were multiple toll rebates available on New South Wales roads such as the $60 toll cap.

It was created to introduce reforms called for by an inquiry into the motorway system conducted by Professor Allan Fels and Dr David Cousins.

== Functions ==
The agency is charged with:

- Establishing a Consumer Advocate
- Regulating toll prices
- Providing advice to the state government on issues affecting motorists.

Additionally, the government will create an Independent Tolling Ombudsman as recommended by the report; this is expected to be operational by early 2026.

The agency was established on 1 July 2025 and became fully operational by the end of the year.

It will take charge of tolling on public roads such as the Sydney Harbour Bridge, Sydney Harbour Tunnel, the upcoming Western Harbour Tunnel and M6 motorway projects.
