= Connector Motorways =

Australian toll road operator

- Type: Transport
- Founded: 2007
- Defunct: January 2010
- Headquarters: Sydney, Australia
- Owner: CK Infrastructure Holdings (19.6%); AMP (15%); Leighton (11%)
- Divisions: Lane Cove Tunnel; Military Road E-ramp
- Website: connectormotorways.com.au

Connector Motorways was an Australian toll road operator which operated the Lane Cove Tunnel and the Falcon Street Gateway (now Military Road E-ramp) in northern Sydney. Both projects opened to the public in March 2007. Connector was owned by CK Infrastructure Holdings (19.6%), AMP (15%) and Leighton (11%)

== Background ==
Connector Motorways started off as the Lane Cove Tunnel Company and was engaged by Roads & Traffic Authority to design, construct, maintain and operate the tunnel for 33 years on 1 October 2003. Connector Motorways was supposed to operate the tunnel concession until 2037.

== Receivership ==
On 19 January 2010, Connector Motorways went into receivership when traffic through the tunnel failed to reach the projected volumes. Toll road operator Transurban bought the tunnel in May 2010 for $630 million and became the new operator.
