= Warringah Freeway =

Freeway in Sydney, New South Wales, Australia

Warringah Freeway New South Wales
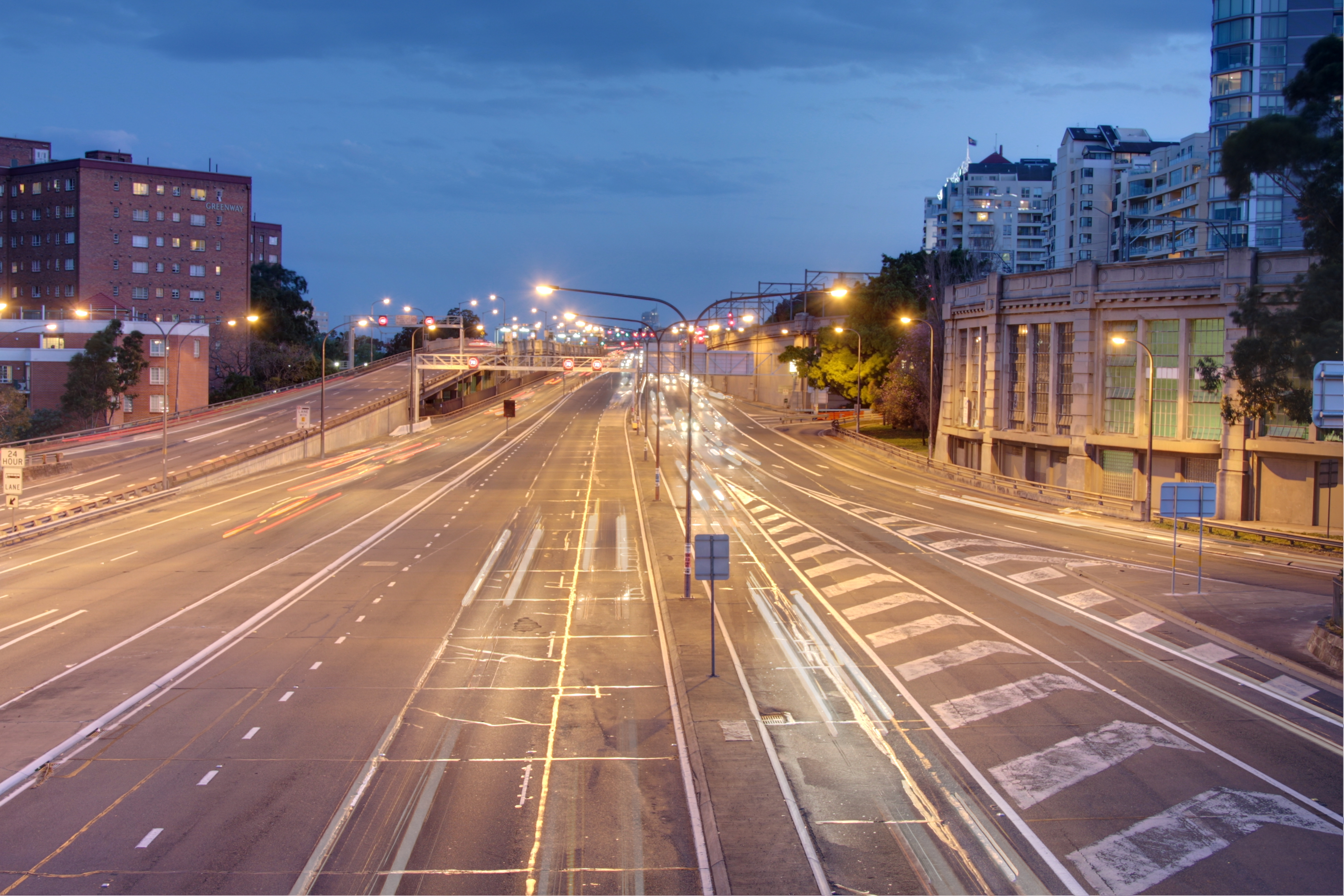
- Southern terminus of Warringah Freeway at its junction with Pacific Highway
- Coordinates: 33.817189°S 151.201537°E (North end); 33.843764°S 151.211460°E (South end)

General information
- Type: Freeway
- Length: 3.5 km (2.2 mi)
- Opened: 1968–1978
- Gazetted: January 1993
- Route number(s): M1 (2013–present) (Naremburn–North Sydney)
- Former route number: Metroad 1 (1993–2013) (Naremburn–North Sydney); Metroad 2 (1993–2007); State Route 28 (1992–1993); National Route 1 (1992–1993); F1 (1968–1992) Entire route

Major junctions
- North end: Gore Hill Freeway; Naremburn, Sydney
- Military Road; Western Harbour Tunnel; Sydney Harbour Tunnel; Pacific Highway
- South end: Bradfield Highway; North Sydney

Location(s)
- Major suburbs / towns: Crows Nest, Cammeray

Highway system
- Highways in Australia; National Highway • Freeways in Australia; Highways in New South Wales

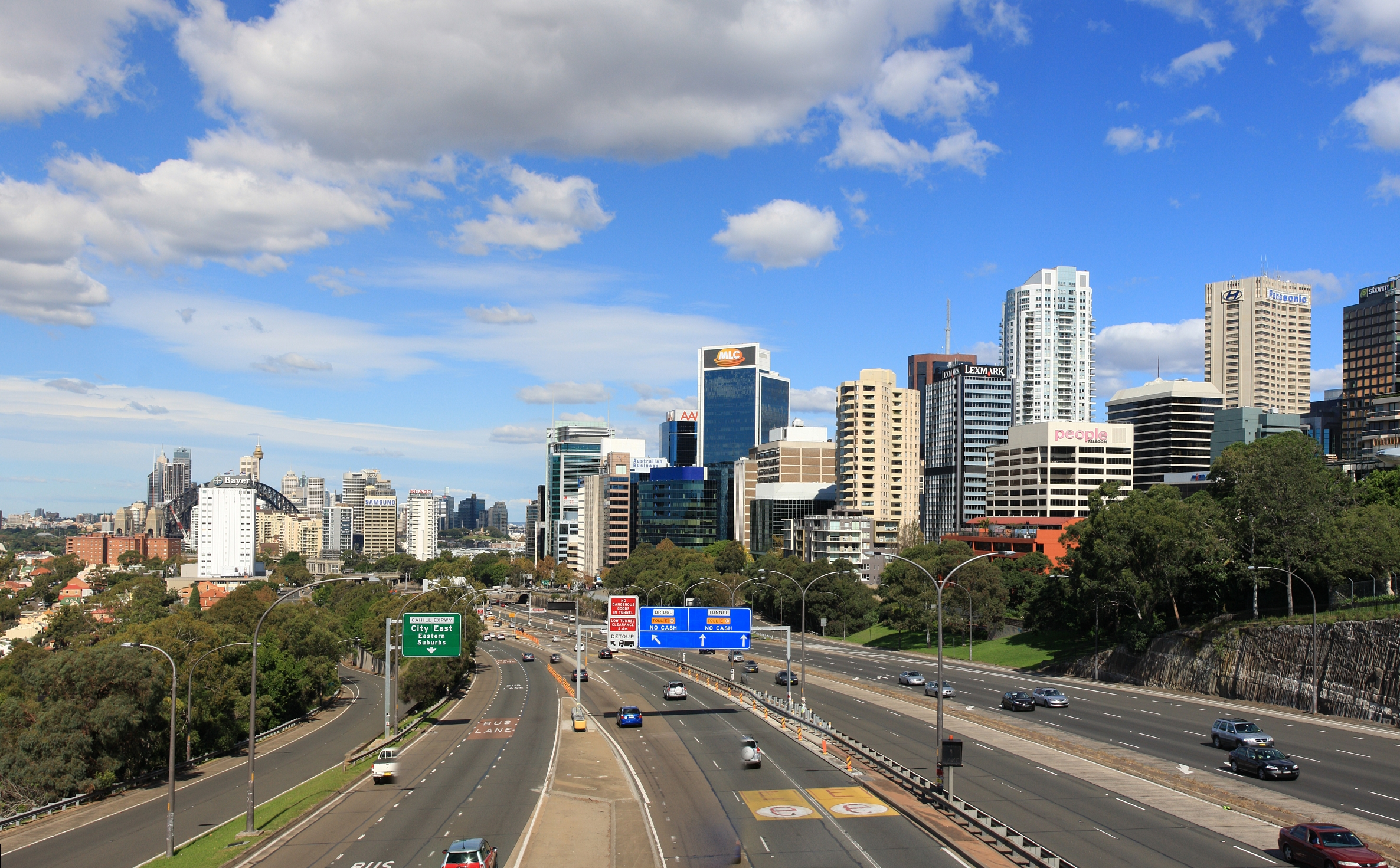
Warringah Freeway looking south at its widest point - 16 lanes

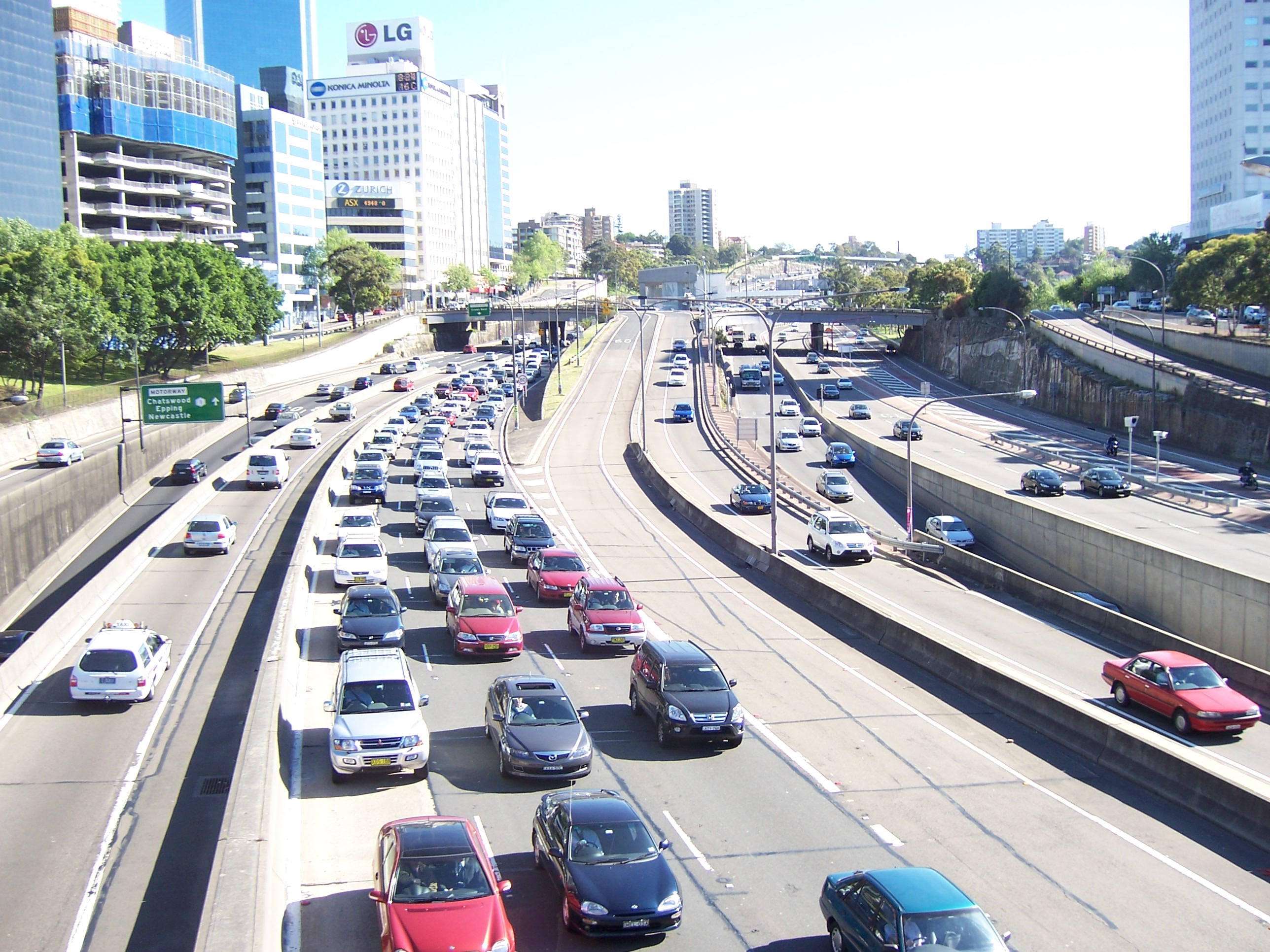
View of Warringah Freeway looking north, over the inner western carriageway, during morning peak hour

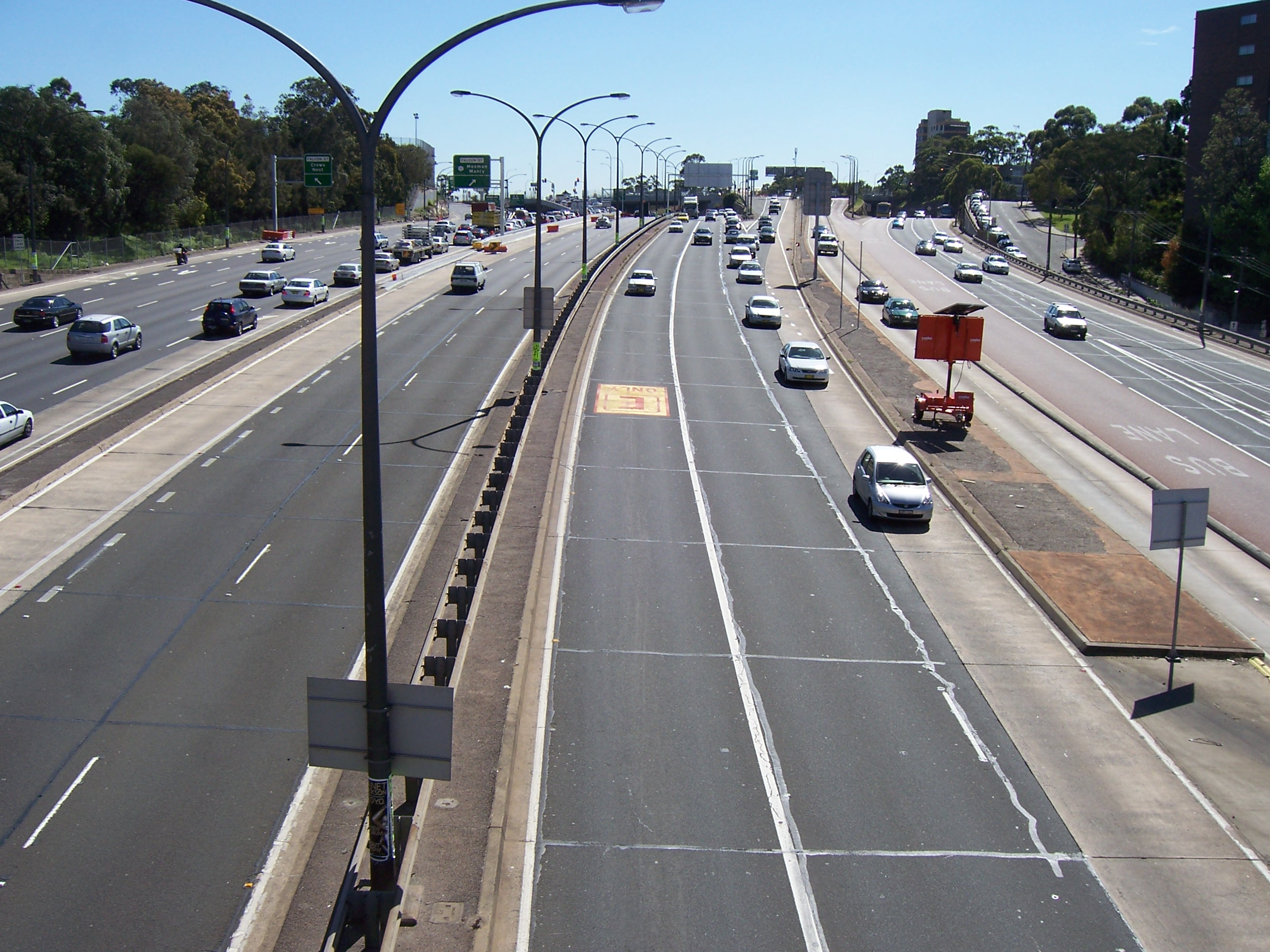
View of Warringah Freeway looking north, towards the Military Road overpass

Warringah Freeway is a 3.5-kilometre (2.2 mi) divided freeway in Sydney, New South Wales, Australia that is part of the Sydney Orbital Network. The primary function of the freeway is to provide an alternative high-grade route from the Sydney Harbour Tunnel and Bradfield Highway at Milsons Point to the A8 and Gore Hill Freeway. The freeway reduces traffic demands on Pacific Highway throughout Sydney's Lower North Shore, bypassing North Sydney and Crows Nest, and provides a vital link to access most of the suburbs in Sydney and is also a major route to the north, south, east and west of the central business district.

== Route ==
Warringah Freeway commences at the interchange with Gore Hill Freeway and Willoughby Road in Naremburn and heads in a southeasterly direction as a six-lane, dual-carriageway road, curving to a southward direction through Cammeray, slowly expanding to 10 lanes across multiple carriageways after the Brook Street exit, and to 16 lanes across the whole corridor for a short distance before the North Sydney northbound onramp. While a number of its inner carriageways were built to allow reversible traffic flows, today only the inner west carriageway is reversible, with the inner east carriageway feeding the Sydney Harbour Tunnel southbound. All carriageways were previously widened by utilising space from the former breakdown lane, and repositioning the existing lanes.

The arrangement is now mostly 4x3x3x3 through the section with the switchable carriageway, with variations in the width of the outer carriageways as ramps enter and exit the freeway. In 2007, major changes to the Military Road overpass have occurred with an extra three ramps added, and two extra lanes on the connecting Gore Hill Freeway at the northern end (part of the Lane Cove Tunnel project). The overpass where these five ramps originate has been widened for an attempt to channel all the traffic.

The carriageway change over process was automated around 1990, with moveable barriers and overhead signage directing traffic onto the correct lanes. The changeover occurs when the Harbour Bridge needs either five or six lanes southbound (the default is four each way). There can only ever be a maximum of 5 lanes northbound off the bridge, with the extra lane feeding into a spare lane on the inner west carriageway. Changeover times are around 06:30 and 09:00 Monday to Friday.

Almost all entry and exit ramps on the freeway are controlled by traffic signals. Most of the ramps are of sufficient length to avoid any delays to through traffic, with the exception of Military Road. The arrangement for accessing the Harbour bridge (for access to the city and western suburbs) southbound can be confusing for anyone unfamiliar with the road, with a choice of either competing with traffic approaching the Sydney Harbour Tunnel via the two lanes at the inner eastern carriageway or having to cross the Bus Lane; traffic improved when the toll collection points (for southbound traffic) became electronic only.

== History ==
Planning for the construction of the freeway began in 1951. Its first stage, connecting the Bradfield Highway to Miller Street, opened on 19 June 1968. It was filled with motorists in peak hours from the time it opened. As its name suggests, the road was envisioned as the first stage of a freeway system for Sydney's Manly/Warringah area. An early alignment had the freeway crossing into the Manly Warringah area via Castlecrag, then later via Castle Cove. The freeway was never extended in this direction due to opposition by the residents of Castlecrag.

A large amount of residential and commercial property, half a golf course, and a cemetery were resumed by the government to build this freeway.

The freeway originally featured a 3x2x2x3 arrangement with the inner two carriageways both running in the same direction during peak times. The changeover process was slow both on the freeway and the Harbour Bridge, with large numbers of red plastic 'candle sticks' or 'candy bars' being manually moved four times every weekday. The original north termination point of the freeway was Chandos Street, Cammeray; with a small extension being added to Willoughby Road in 1978. The Chandos Street ramps were moved to Brook Street at this time.

It was not until 1992, when the opening of Gore Hill Freeway connected Warringah Freeway to Pacific Highway, that the road officially became part of Australia's Highway 1. Until then, it had been a short freeway that terminated curiously in the middle of the suburbs, despite being Sydney's most prominent freeway, the "F1", with 16 lanes connecting to Bradfield Highway over the Sydney Harbour Bridge.

The passing of the Main Roads Act of 1924 through the Parliament of New South Wales provided for the declaration of Main Roads, roads partially funded by the State government through the Main Roads Board (MRB). With the subsequent passing of the Main Roads (Amendment) Act of 1929 to provide for additional declarations of State Highways and Trunk Roads, the Department of Main Roads (having succeeded the MRB in 1932) declared Main Road 651 along the freeway, from the interchange with Bradfield Highway and Lavender Street in North Sydney to the interchange with Gore Hill Freeway and Willoughby Road in Naremburn (and continuing northwest along the Gore Hill Freeway to Lane Cove), on 22 January 1993. Despite its role as a grade-separated freeway, the road is not officially gazetted as one by Transport for NSW classification, and is still considered today to be a main road.

The passing of the Roads Act of 1993 updated road classifications and the way they could be declared within New South Wales. Under this act, Warringah Freeway retains its declaration as part of Main Road 651.

A 24-hour Bus Lane (buses, taxi cabs and hire cars) was added after the Sydney Harbour Tunnel opened in 1992. It runs southbound on the outer carriageway and across the Harbour Bridge. This has proven to be a major success, carrying more persons in the morning peak hour than all other southbound lanes combined. The first of the new Military Road ramps opened in June 2006. Most northbound traffic now has to exit from the right of the six northbound outer carriageway lanes, instead of the left. The previous exit ramp (for a right turn into Military Road) previously had three general lanes and one bus lane. There are now no general lanes, and two bus lanes. Traffic turning left into Falcon Street still uses the old ramp. The stated reason for this change is to remove all the traffic which enters the freeway at North Sydney, then exits again at Military Road, adding to peak hour delays.

The route was allocated Freeway Route 1 when it was opened in 1968; when the extension to Willoughby Road opened in 1978, it was extended along with it. It was replaced by National Route 1, and State Route 28 was extended from its previous terminus (at Longueville Road and Pacific Highway in Lane Cove) along Gore Hill Freeway and Warringah Freeway to Bradfield Highway, when Gore Hill Freeway opened in 1992. National Route 1 was diverted from Warringah Freeway along the Sydney Harbour Tunnel at North Sydney when it was opened later in 1992. National Route 1 was replaced by Metroad 1, and State Route 28 was replaced by Metroad 2, in 1993; Metroad 2 was eventually removed when the Lane Cove Tunnel opened in 2007. With the conversion to the newer alphanumeric system in 2013, Metroad 1 was replaced by route M1.

=== Original blueprint ===
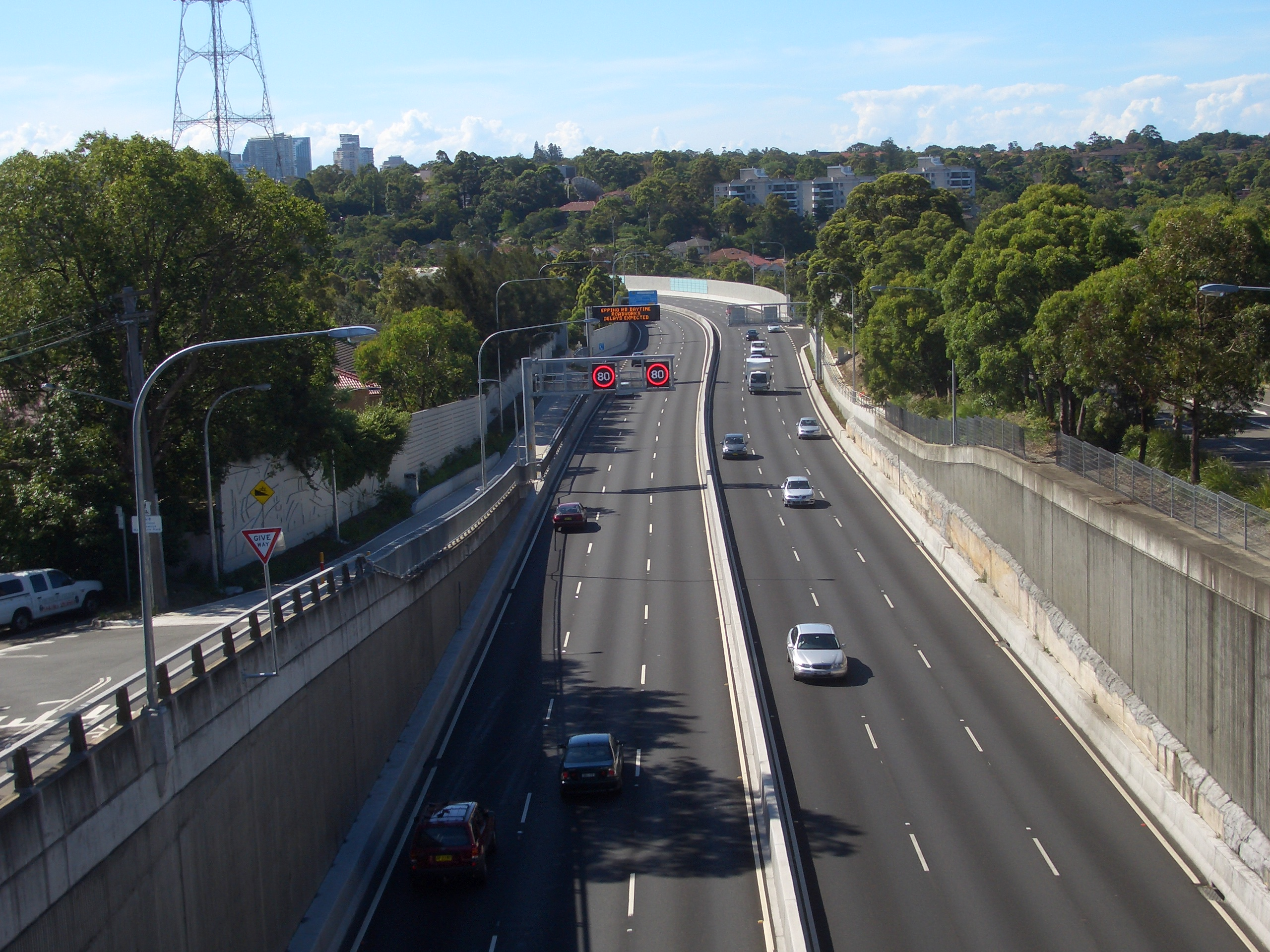
Gore Hill Freeway, following on from Warringah Freeway, looking north from Naremburn exit

Following the opening of the first section of this freeway in 1968, there were plans for six further stages to be constructed to the north.

- Stage 1 – Willoughby Road extension, and a tunnel under the North Shore Line. Planned completion 1973. Willoughby road extension completed 1978. Tunnel under the railway completed 1992 as part of the Gore Hill Freeway.
- Stage 2 – Northbridge to Castlecrag, and Wakehurst Parkway link. Planned completion 1974. Never built due to lobbying by the Castlecrag Progress Association.
- Stage 3 – Bridge over Middle Harbour between east Castlecrag and Seaforth. Planned completion 1974. Never built due to lobbying by the Castlecrag Progress Association.
- Stage 4 – Seaforth to Balgowlah spur link. Planned completion 1974. Never built due to lobbying by the Castlecrag Progress Association.
- Stage 5 – Upgrade of Wakehurst Parkway to freeway conditions to Warringah Road. Spur link to Manly Vale. Planned completion 1977. Partially completed (Burnt Bridge Creek Deviation) 1985.
- Stage 6 – Willoughby Road to Pacific Highway/Epping road junction. Planned completion 1980. Completed 1992 as the Gore Hill Freeway.

Various proposals over the years have been made to complete Warringah Freeway to the area of its name, due to the chronic traffic problems afflicting the North Shore from Mosman to Chatswood. The residents of Castlecrag, who opposed the construction of this freeway, also suffer from these traffic problems, however, they find this preferable to the environmental and aesthetic amelioration that the area would have suffered, had the construction of Stage 3 gone ahead.

In the early 2000s, one proposal from the Liberal state opposition was for the construction of a six lane tunnel starting at the Burnt Bridge Creek Deviation in Balgowlah, joining with Gore Hill Freeway. The Liberal Party formed state government in 2011, and the proposal became known as the Beaches Link.

=== Warringah Freeway Upgrade ===
The NSW Government proposal to build the Western Harbour Tunnel and Beaches Link included plans to upgrade Warringah Freeway to accommodate the tunnel entries and exits. The works were expected to take about seven years and would involve significant impacts to adjacent parks (St Leonards and Cammeray Golf Course) during and after construction. Roads & Maritime Services claimed the upgrade would "streamline Australia's busiest road".

In September 2021, the design and construction contract for the Warringah Freeway upgrade was awarded to CPB Contractors and Downer EDI.

In 2023, the state government cancelled the Beaches Link, citing budgetary and other pressures. The local federal member for Warringah, Zali Steggall, criticised the decision; while the local Willoughby City Council welcomed the move.

== Tolls ==
Warringah Freeway itself does not have any tolls. However, a toll is charged when entering or exiting Warringah Freeway (north) to and from Military Road (A8) and Falcon Street.

Toll prices as of 1 July 2025
Toll road	Class A toll prices (Note: Class A vehicles are typically cars and motorcycles; Class B vehicles are all other vehicles including trucks and heavy vehicles.)	Class B toll prices	Toll increase	Toll concessionaire	Expiry of toll concession
Military Road E-Ramp (to / from Warringah Freeway)	$2.07	$7.13	Quarterly on 1 January, 1 April, 1 July, and 1 October, by the greater of quarterly CPI or 1%	Transurban	June 2048

== Exits and interchanges ==
LGA	Location	km	mi	Destinations	Notes
Willoughby	Naremburn	0.0	0.0	Gore Hill Freeway (M1) - Lane Cove, Epping	Northern terminus of freeway, route M1 continues west along Gore Hill Freeway
Willoughby	Naremburn	0.0	0.0	Willoughby Road – Crows Nest, Roseville	Northbound exit and southbound entrance only
North Sydney	Crows Nest	0.5	0.31	Brook Street – St Leonards, Naremburn	Northbound exit and southbound entrance
North Sydney	Cammeray	1.0	0.62	Miller Street - Cammeray, Northbridge	Northbound exit and southbound entrance
North Sydney	Cammeray	1.4	0.87	Ernest Street – Crows Nest, Cremorne	Northbound exit and southbound entrance
North Sydney	North Sydney	1.6	0.99	Military Road (A8 east) – Mosman, Manly, Crows Nest	Tolled northbound entrance and southbound exit only
North Sydney	North Sydney	1.6	0.99	Falcon Street (west) – St Leonards	No right turn from southbound exit into Falcon Street
North Sydney	North Sydney	2.0	1.2	Alfred Street North - North Sydney, Neutral Bay	Southbound exit only
North Sydney	North Sydney	2.2	1.4	Berry Street - North Sydney	Northbound entrance only
North Sydney	North Sydney	2.4	1.5	Sydney Harbour Tunnel (M1) - Woolloomooloo, Heathcote, Wollongong, Sydney Airport	Southbound exit and northbound entrance, route M1 continues south along tunnel Toll on southbound traffic only, no toll northbound
North Sydney	North Sydney	2.8	1.7	Mount Street to High Street - Neutral Bay, Kirribilli	Northbound exit and southbound entrance
North Sydney	North Sydney	3.2	2.0	Pacific Highway - North Sydney	Northbound exit only
North Sydney	North Sydney	3.5	2.2	Lavender Street - Kirribilli, Lavender Bay	Northbound exit only
North Sydney	North Sydney	3.5	2.2	Bradfield Highway - Millers Point, Sydney CBD	Southern terminus of freeway, continues south as Bradfield Highway; Toll on southbound traffic only, no toll northbound
1.000 mi = 1.609 km; 1.000 km = 0.621 mi: Incomplete access; Tolled; Route transition

== In popular culture ==
The freeway was briefly seen in the 1974 feature film Stoner.

== See also ==
- Freeways in Australia
- Freeways in Sydney
