= Burnt Bridge Creek Deviation =

Road in the Northern Beaches of Sydney

Burnt Bridge Creek Deviation New South Wales
- Coordinates: 33.796097°S 151.252853°E (Southwest end); 33.788391°S 151.265716°E (Northeast end)

General information
- Type: Road
- Length: 1.7 km (1.1 mi)
- Opened: 11 February 1985
- Route number(s): A8 (2013–present)
- Former route number: Metroad 10 (1998–2013); State Route 14 (1985–1998)

Major junctions
- Southwest end: Manly Road; Balgowlah, Sydney
- Sydney Road
- Northeast end: Condamine Street; Manly Vale, Sydney

Burnt Bridge Creek Deviation is a 1.7-kilometre-long (1.1 mi) major arterial road in the Northern Beaches area of Sydney, Australia, and is a constituent part of the A8 route. It takes its name from Burnt Bridge Creek which flows beneath the road, although there is no sign of the "burnt bridge" which gives the creek its name.

== Route ==
Burnt Bridge Creek Deviation commences just past the Spit Bridge at the intersection with Sydney Road, Balgowlah to the intersection with Condamine Street in Manly Vale. There are no entry or exit ramps, and sound barriers run the entire length. Myrtle Street and Kitchener Street run over it but there are no access ramps to or from these roads. It runs, in a northbound direction, close to Frenchs Forest Road, then Brook Road, Bangaroo Street, Serpentine Crescent, Daisy Street, Myrtle Street, Kitchener Street, West Street, Griffiths Street then terminates at Condamine Street. The speed limit is 80 km/h for most of its length, reducing to 60 km/h prior to either terminus.

The most direct alternative route is to go east on Sydney Road then north on Condamine Street.

== History ==
Opened on 11 February 1985, it is the only freeway-standard section of that route.

The passing of the Main Roads Act of 1924 through the Parliament of New South Wales provided for the declaration of Main Roads, roads partially funded by the State government through the Main Roads Board (MRB). With the subsequent passing of the Main Roads (Amendment) Act of 1929 to provide for additional declarations of State Highways and Trunk Roads, the Department of Main Roads (having succeeded the MRB in 1932) declared the deviation of Main Road 164 from Condamine Street and Sydney Road to Burnt Bridge Creek Deviation on 15 February 1985.

The passing of the Roads Act of 1993 updated road classifications and the way they could be declared within New South Wales. Under this act, Burnt Bridge Creek Deviation retains its declaration as part of Main Road 164.

The route was signed as part of State Route 14 on its opening in 1985, then was re-designated Metroad 10 in 1998. With the conversion to the newer alphanumeric system in 2013, Metroad 10 was replaced by route A8.

=== Future Upgrades ===
Until the announcement of the Beaches Link project, Burnt Bridge Creek Deviation sat for decades as an isolated oddity, reminiscent of many planned and never-built freeways in the Sydney Basin, much like the Gladesville Bridge road complex. Original plans for Warringah Freeway show Burnt Bridge Creek Deviation as part of an expressway that would service the growing Northern Beaches area. Suggestions have been floated in the interim to connect the two freeways, with the aid of a tunnel, but it took almost four decades for concrete plans to be made for the connection.

The A8 was planned to eventually connect with M8 Motorway in the Inner West from the western end of Burnt Bridge Creek Deviation via the Beaches Link, M4–M8 Link, and Rozelle Interchange, and the Government of New South Wales announced its intention to build the Beaches Link in March 2017. Construction on the Western Harbour Tunnel commenced in 2022 and is expected to be complete in 2027-28. However, in June 2022 the NSW Government announced that Beaches Link and upgrades to Burnt Bridge Creek Deviation and Wakehurst Parkway would be shelved indefinitely, due to market constraints and labour shortages.

== Major intersections ==
Pittwater Road is entirely contained within the Northern Beaches Council local government area.

| Location | km | mi | Destinations | Notes |
|---|---|---|---|---|
| Seaforth–Balgowlah boundary | 0.0 | 0.0 | Manly Road (A8) – Mosman, North Sydney | Route A8 continues south along Manly Road |
| Seaforth–Balgowlah boundary | 0.0 | 0.0 | Sydney Road – Seaforth, Balgowlah | |
| Manly Vale–Balgowlah boundary | 1.7 | 1.1 | Condamine Street (A8 north, unallocated south) – Dee Why, Narrabeen, Mona Vale | Route A8 continues north along Condamine Street |
Route transition

== Incidents ==
On the 18th September 2024 at approximately 10:45 pm, a 23 year old man and a 26 year old woman were killed on impact while driving on their way back from a car meet at Taronga Zoo. A motorist travelling northbound along the road stated the black Toyota Corolla “disappeared ahead of them” whilst taking off at a set of traffic lights at Seaforth, New South Wales. Local residents claimed to have heard multiple cars racing at speed followed by explosions that sounded like gunshots. The cause of the crash has not yet been determined but it is believed speed was a contributing factor.
