= Gore Hill Freeway =

Freeway in Sydney, New South Wales, Australia

Gore Hill Freeway New South Wales
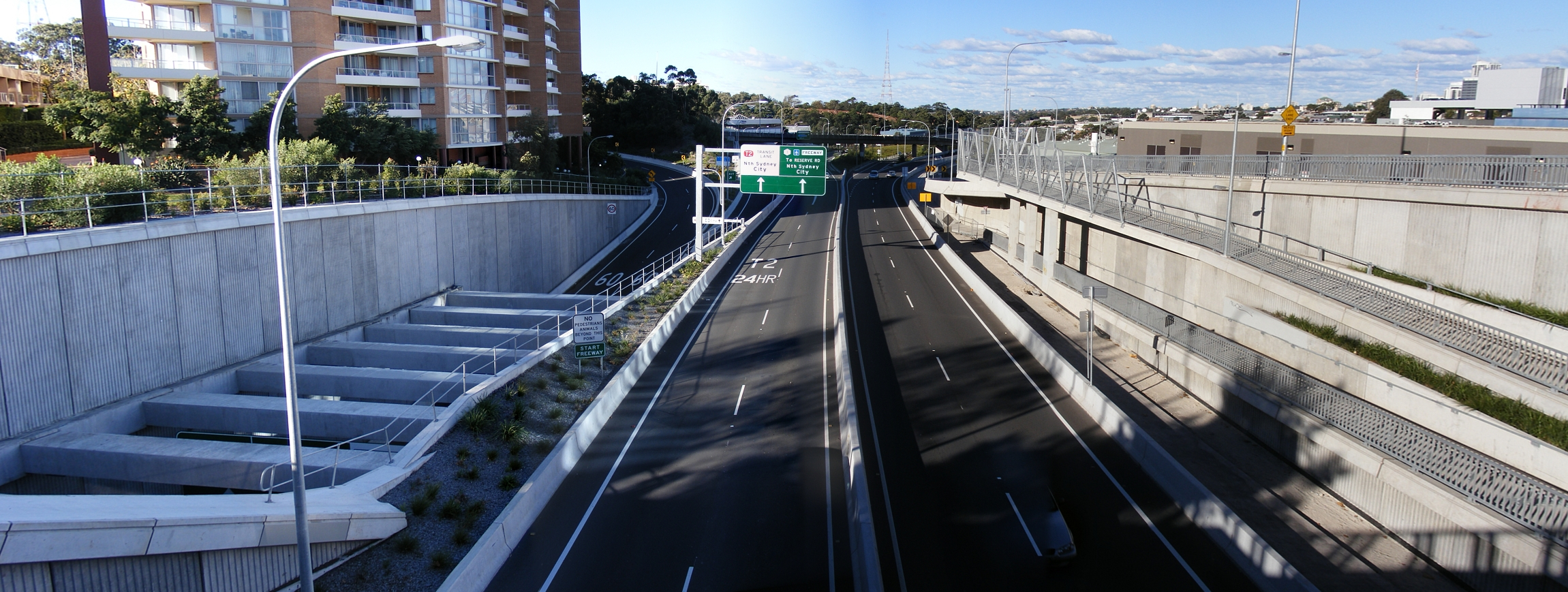
- Gore Hill Freeway in Lane Cove
- Coordinates: 33.812364°S 151.175508°E (Western end); 33.817189°S 151.201537°E (Eastern end)

General information
- Type: Freeway
- Length: 3.2 km (2.0 mi)
- Opened: 26 August 1992
- Gazetted: January 1993
- Route number(s): M1 (2013–present)
- Former route number: Metroad 1 (1993–2013); Metroad 2 (1993–2007); State Route 28 (1992–1993); National Route 1 (1992–1993)

Major junctions
- Western end: Lane Cove Tunnel; Lane Cove, Sydney
- Pacific Highway
- Eastern end: Warringah Freeway; Naremburn, Sydney

Location(s)
- Major suburbs / towns: Artarmon

Highway system
- Highways in Australia; National Highway • Freeways in Australia; Highways in New South Wales

Gore Hill Freeway is a 4-kilometre (2.5 mi) divided freeway located in Sydney, New South Wales that is part of the Sydney Orbital Network and Highway 1. The primary function of the freeway is to provide an alternative high-grade route from Lane Cove to Naremburn and to reduce traffic demands on Pacific Highway throughout Sydney's Lower North Shore, bypassing Gore Hill and St Leonards.

== Route ==
Gore Hill Freeway commences at the interchange of Pacific Highway and Longueville Road at Lane Cove, and heads east as a four-lane, dual-carriageway road, widening to six lanes a short distance later east of the ramps to the northern section of Pacific Highway. It curves to a southeasterly direction before terminating at the interchange at Warringah Freeway and Willoughby Road at Naremburn. Road signs designate Gore Hill Freeway simply as Freeway.

Forming part of the Sydney Orbital Network, the freeway provides access to most of the suburbs in Sydney; it is also a major route to the north, south, east and west of the metropolis.

Sound walls were pioneered as both art and architecture incorporating abstract road motifs in bas relief concrete and historical designs by Walter Burley Griffin. The language reinterprets local aboriginal rock engravings chipped into the ribbed retaining walls.

== History ==
Construction of the freeway commenced in October 1988 as part of the Bicentennial Roads Program and opened to traffic on 26 August 1992. This connected Pacific Highway at Lane Cove to Warringah Freeway and eventually to the Sydney Harbour Bridge via a high-standard freeway route, bypassing the congested section of Pacific Highway through North Sydney.

The passing of the Main Roads Act of 1924 through the Parliament of New South Wales provided for the declaration of Main Roads, roads partially funded by the State government through the Main Roads Board (MRB). With the subsequent passing of the Main Roads (Amendment) Act of 1929 to provide for additional declarations of State Highways and Trunk Roads, the Department of Main Roads (having succeeded the MRB in 1932) declared Main Road 651 along the freeway, from the interchange with Pacific Highway and Longueville Road in Lane Cove to the interchange with Warringah Freeway and Willoughby Road in Naremburn (and continuing south along Warringah Freeway to North Sydney), on 22 January 1993. Despite its role as a grade-separated freeway, the road is not officially gazetted as one by Transport for NSW classification, and is still considered today to be a main road.

The passing of the Roads Act of 1993 updated road classifications and the way they could be declared within New South Wales. Under this act, Gore Hill Freeway retains its declaration as part of Main Road 651.

The freeway was allocated National Route 1, and State Route 28 was extended from its previous terminus (at Longueville Road and Pacific Highway in Lane Cove) along Gore Hill Freeway, when it opened in 1992. National Route 1 was replaced by Metroad 1, and State Route 28 was replaced by Metroad 2, in 1993; Metroad 2 was eventually removed when the Lane Cove Tunnel opened in 2007. With the conversion to the newer alphanumeric system in 2013, Metroad 1 was replaced by route M1.

== Exits and interchanges ==
Gore Hill Freeway is entirely contained within the City of Willoughby local government area.

Location	km	mi	Destinations	Notes
Lane Cove–Lane Cove North–Artarmon tripoint	0.0	0.0	Lane Cove Tunnel (M2) - Baulkham Hills, Windsor	Western terminus of freeway
Lane Cove–Lane Cove North–Artarmon tripoint	0.0	0.0	Pacific Highway (A1 north, unallocated south) - Wahroonga, Chatswood, Crows Nest	Western terminus of route M1; route A1 continues north along Pacific Highway
Artarmon	0.5	0.31	Longueville Road - Lane Cove to Epping Road - North Ryde, Epping	Eastbound entrance and westbound exit only
Artarmon	0.9	0.56	Reserve Road - Artarmon	No westbound entrance or eastbound exit to Pacific Highway
Artarmon	1.6	0.99	North Shore railway line	
Naremburn	3.2	2.0	Willoughby Road – Crows Nest, Roseville	Eastbound exit and westbound entrance only
Naremburn	3.2	2.0	Warringah Freeway (M1) - North Sydney, Sydney CBD, Sydney Airport	Eastern terminus of freeway, route M1 continues southeast along Warringah Freeway
1.000 mi = 1.609 km; 1.000 km = 0.621 mi: Incomplete access; Tolled; Route transition

== See also ==
- Freeways in Australia
- Freeways in Sydney
