= Western Harbour Tunnel =

Road tunnel in Sydney, New South Wales, Australia

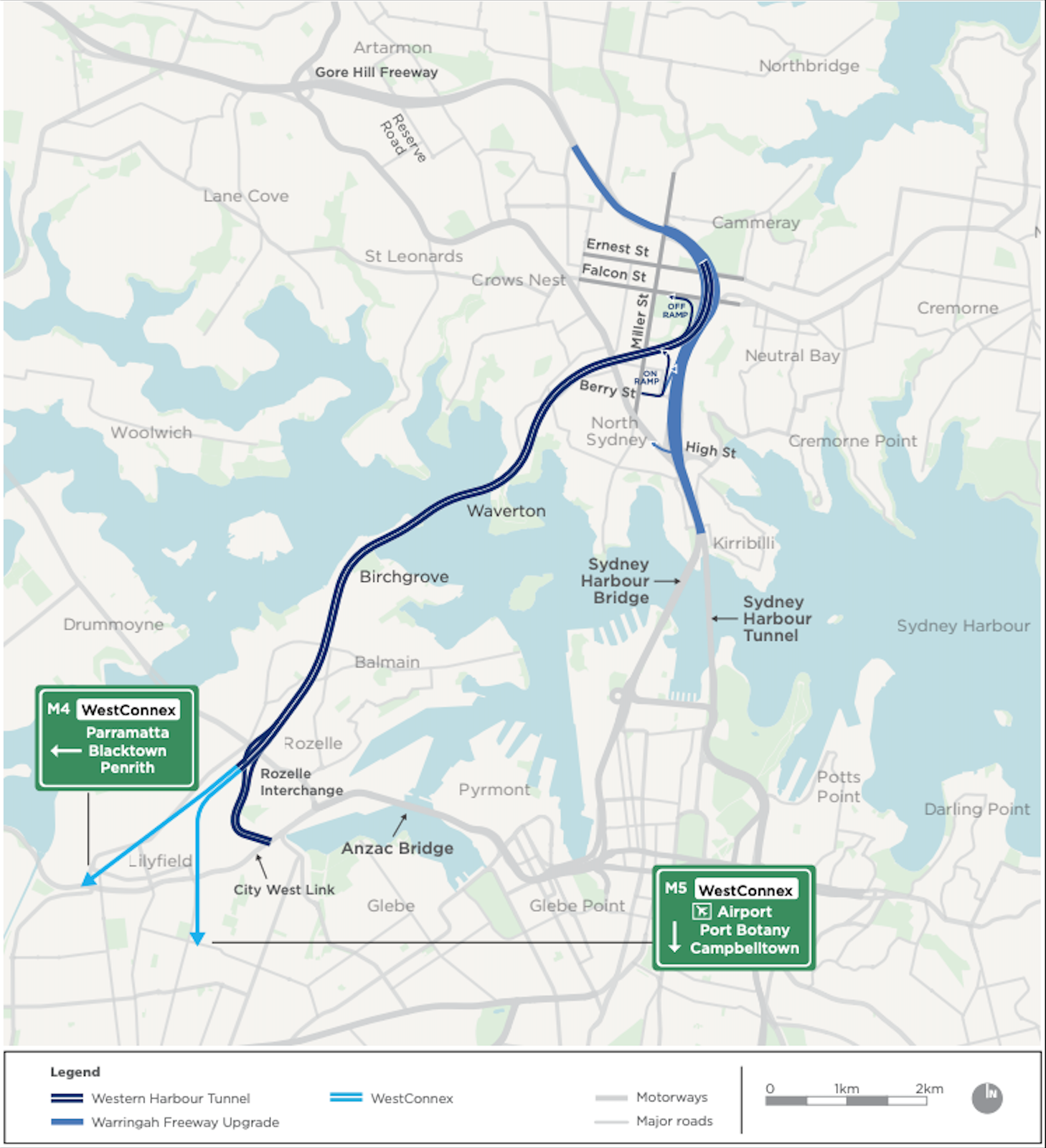
- Plan of the Western Harbour Tunnel

Overview
- Location: Sydney Harbour
- Status: Under construction
- Start: Warringah Freeway, Cammeray
- End: Rozelle Interchange, Rozelle

Operation
- Work began: 2021
- Opened: Late 2028 (scheduled)
- Owner: Transport for NSW
- Operator: Ventia
- Traffic: Vehicular

Technical
- Length: 6.5 km (4.0 mi)
- No. of lanes: 6

Map of the tunnel

The Western Harbour Tunnel is a tunnel under construction in Sydney, New South Wales, Australia. The six lane, 6.5-kilometre (4.0 mi) twin tunnels will run from Cammeray to Rozelle, passing beneath Sydney Harbour. It is scheduled for completion in 2028.

The tunnel will form part of the M8 Motorway when it opens. It is expected to cost $14 billion.

== Alignment ==
The Western Harbour Tunnel will start at the Warringah Freeway at Cammeray passing beneath North Sydney before crossing under Sydney Harbour between Balls Head and Birchgrove. It will then continue beneath Birchgrove and Balmain ending at the Rozelle Interchange, with connections to City West Link and WestConnex towards the M4 and M8 motorways.

== History ==
=== Planning ===
The Western Harbour Tunnel was introduced as a single project with the Beaches Link, aimed at reducing the level of traffic congestion in the greater Sydney area. The Sydney Harbour Bridge and Sydney Harbour Tunnel corridor currently carry 80 percent of all vehicles crossing Sydney Harbour and the Parramatta River, greatly increasing traffic congestion. The Government of New South Wales pledged $77 million in funding to evaluate the design and construction feasibility of the project. The design phase began in April 2017.

Community engagement and the environment assessment for both components were undertaken during 2020 and 2021. Planning approval was received in January 2021.

=== Tenders ===
In December 2020, three potential development partners to assist with the procurement and delivery of the project were shortlisted:

- Bechtel
- Harbour West Partners, a consortium comprising Macquarie Capital, Jacobs and RPS
- Laing O'Rourke

By September 2021, the search for a development partner had been scrapped.

In September 2021 the design and construction contract for the Warringah Freeway upgrade was awarded to a CPB Contractors and Downer Group joint venture. In January 2022, the tunnelling contract for stage one of the tunnel between Rozelle and Birchgrove was awarded to a John Holland / CPB Contractors joint venture.

Three bidders were shortlisted for the stage two between Cammeray and Birchgrove:

- Acciona
- Bouygues / Vinci joint venture
- John Holland / CPB Contractors / UGL joint venture

In December 2022, the contract was awarded to Acciona.

On 30 November 2025, it was announced that the Western Harbour Tunnel will be the first motorway not to require an e-tag as all other Australian tolled motorways and freeways do. The contract for tolling services has been awarded to the US-based TransCore.

=== Construction ===
Early work activities commenced in March 2021, while major construction of the Warringah Freeway upgrade and the Western Harbour Tunnel began in late 2021 and 2022 respectively. Construction of stage two commenced in November 2023.

Originally it was planned to sink immersed tubes into the harbour bed. In November 2022, it was decided to instead use tunnel boring machines to bore out tunnels below the harbour floor.

The construction of stub tunnels at the Western Harbour Tunnel portals in Cammeray reserve a future connection to Beaches Link, should it be built by a future government.

The project was halfway complete by November 2026.

== Operations and maintenance ==
In April 2022, the state government signed a 15 year contract with Ventia for the asset management, operations and maintenance of the Sydney Harbour Tunnel and the future Western Harbour Tunnel. Tolling arrangements of both tunnels were unrelated to the new agreement.

The Western Harbour Tunnel will be among the first motorways in New South Wales to be publicly owned under a new government agency titled NSW Motorways.
