= Lane Cove Tunnel =

Motorway tunnel in Sydney, New South Wales, Australia

Coordinates: 33.81039°S 151.15934°E

- Interactive map of Lane Cove Tunnel

Overview
- Location: Lane Cove, New South Wales, Australia
- Status: Open
- Route: M2 (2013–present)
- Start: Hills Motorway, North Ryde
- End: Gore Hill Freeway, Artarmon

Operation
- Work began: June 2004
- Opened: 25 March 2007
- Operator: Transurban
- Toll: see Tolls

Technical
- Length: 3.6 km (2.2 mi)
- No. of lanes: 4
- Operating speed: 80 km/h (variable)
- Tunnel clearance: 4.4 m (14 ft)
- Width: 15 m (49 ft)

The Lane Cove Tunnel is a 3.6-kilometre (2.2 mi) twin-tunnel tollway in Sydney, New South Wales, Australia that is part of the Sydney Orbital Network. Owned by Transurban, It connects the M2 Motorway at North Ryde with the Gore Hill Freeway at Artarmon and forms part of Sydney's M2 route, with the M2 Hills Motorway constituting the rest of the M2 route.

== History ==
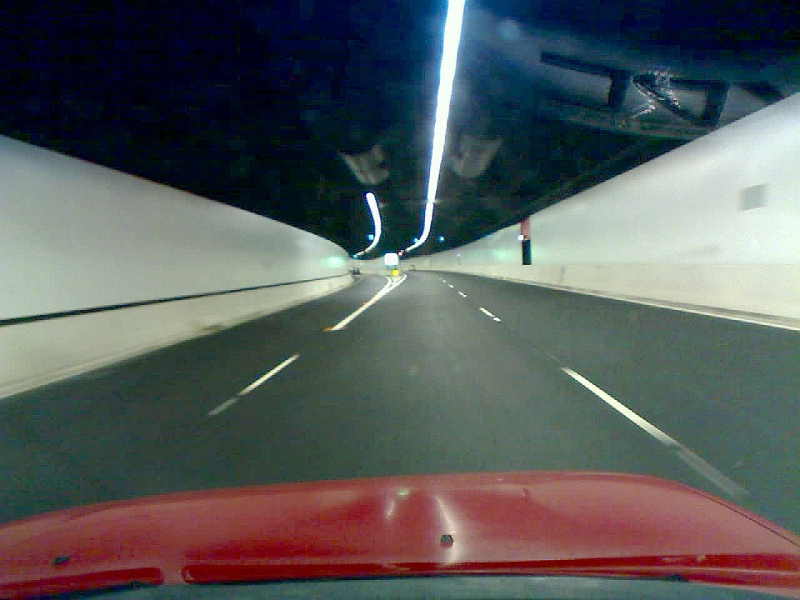
Inside the Lane Cove Tunnel

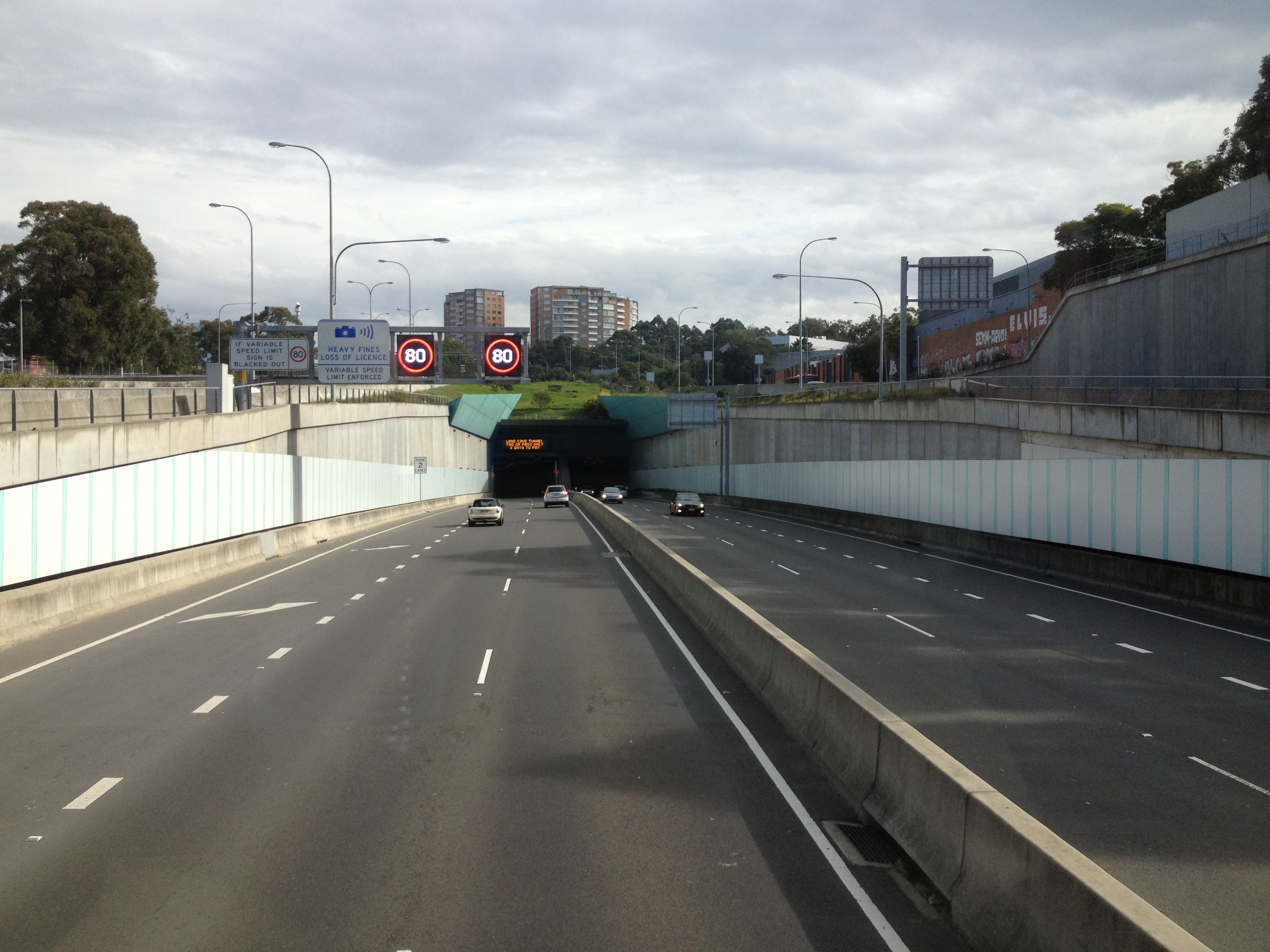
Westbound entrance and eastbound exit in Artarmon

Travelling eastbound through the tunnel and its approach from Epping Road

On 1 October 2003, the Lane Cove Tunnel Company was awarded a $1.1 billion contract to design and construct the tunnel as a joint venture between Thiess and John Holland. The company, later known as Connector Motorways, would operate the tunnel as well as the associated Falcon Street Gateway (now Military Road E-ramp).

It was intended to replace the few kilometres motorists had to drive along Epping Road, through the suburb of Lane Cove, between two sections of freeway.

During construction, in the early hours of 2 November 2005, the roof of a ventilation tunnel for the project collapsed. The collapse caused a 10 by 10 metre crater to appear near the southbound exit ramp of the Pacific Highway. It also damaged a three-storey building at 11–13 Longueville Road, forcing the evacuation of 47 people. Emergency crews pumped 1000 cubic metres of concrete into the hole to try to stop the housing block from collapsing into it. An investigation by Workcover NSW found that the collapse was caused by geological conditions at the site, the large span width of the tunnel, and inadequacy of roof support. The proximity of the excavations to the surface resulted in the property damage.

The tunnel was opened on 25 March 2007, two months ahead of schedule, by four workers who represented the 9,000 who had worked on the Lane Cove Tunnel, the Military Road E-Ramp and the widened Gore Hill Freeway Project. Following the opening there was a one-month toll-free period.

Connector Motorways was supposed to operate the tunnel concession until 2037. However, the project was a disaster for the company, which went into receivership in January 2010 after a string of losses. Toll road operator Transurban bought the tunnel in May 2010 for $630 million and became the new operator.

== Alternative routes ==
Before the opening of the tunnel, motorists had to drive along Epping Road through the suburb of Lane Cove, for the few kilometres between two freeway sections. Studies by the tunnel operator indicated that the Lane Cove Tunnel would cut road travel times by up to 17 minutes and save motorists over $4 a trip.

After the completion of the consequential surface road changes in March 2008, the existing Epping Road was slated to have 24-hour bus lanes to reduce travel times for east and west bound bus services, a new bus interchange, a shared cyclist and pedestrian path, and other measures were implemented to improve public transport and local traffic in the corridor. Changes to the road network in the area had the primary aim of encourage traffic to use the new tolled tunnel instead of the untolled surface road.

== Interchanges ==
LGA	Location	km	mi	Destinations	Notes
Ryde	North Ryde	0	0.0	M2 Hills Motorway / Epping Road – Epping, Windsor	Western end
Willoughby	Artarmon	3.6	2.2	Gore Hill Freeway (M1) / Pacific Highway (A1) – Sydney, Sydney Airport	Eastern end
1.000 mi = 1.609 km; 1.000 km = 0.621 mi

== Tolls ==
Toll prices as of 1 July 2025
Toll road	Class A toll prices (Note: Class A vehicles are typically cars and motorcycles; Class B vehicles are all other vehicles including trucks and heavy vehicles.)	Class B toll prices	Toll increase	Toll concessionaire	Expiry of toll concession
Lane Cove Tunnel	$4.13	$14.26	Quarterly on 1 January, 1 April, 1 July, and 1 October, by the greater of quarterly CPI or 1%	Transurban	June 2048

== Controversy ==
=== Air quality ===
A report by CSIRO Deputy Chief of Air Science, Dr Peter Manins, concluded the ambient air quality modelling undertaken for Lane Cove Tunnel was 'best practice'. The air quality modelling indicated that the Lane Cove Tunnel would comfortably meet the air quality requirements set by the Planning Minister's Conditions of Approval. Dr Manins also said most of the air quality modelling results were in fact likely to "over estimate emission and pollution levels".

Ambient air quality is monitored at four monitoring stations nearby the tunnel's ventilation stacks. The monitoring results are published in real time on the operator's website.

The air quality readings published for particulate matter (PM10) are 24-hour averages, as required by the Planning Minister's Conditions of Approval for the tunnel. Some commentators are concerned that averaging the readings over 24 hours disguises the fact that the 50uG goal may be exceeded during peak periods, with low readings, which typically occur after midnight, effectively counteracting short-term breaches which occur during peak periods.

=== 2007 state election ===
The Iemma government was accused of interfering in the tunnel project to increase its re-election chances in the March 2007 election. The tunnel's expected late-2006 opening was pushed back to "January or February", closer to the poll date. That deadline was missed and the opening occurred 25 March, the day after the election.

In December 2006, it was announced that surface road changes would be delayed by five months, meaning that they would not be completed until after state and federal elections. The delay, which was likely to cut into tunnel revenues, was agreed to by the operators at a cost to taxpayers of $25 million.

The Sydney Morning Herald described the payment as a bribe and a political rort. According to a Herald editorial, "The use of public funds to compensate Connector Motorways for delays to road changes around the tunnel is ... as cynical a piece of political jobbery as Sydney has seen in many a long year."

=== Changes to Epping Road ===
Changes made to Epping Road and associated roads included:

- A bus interchange, completed in March 2008, on the corner of Longueville Road and Parklands Avenue at Lane Cove.
- A new pedestrian bridge across Longueville Road providing access to the bus interchange and a link to Lane Cove village.
- A new cycleway and pedestrian path between Mowbray Road and Pacific Highway, to join the completed cycleway between Mowbray and Wicks Road, North Ryde, and along the Gore Hill Freeway between Pacific Highway and Naremburn.
- Because over 30 per cent of all travel on Epping Road is by public transport, bus-only lanes were provided.

Some parts of Epping Road and Longueville Road required widening to provide the dedicated bus lanes and cycle path.

Epping Road eastbound, between Mowbray Road west and Longueville Road, Lane Cove, has one general traffic lane and one bus lane eastbound.

Epping Road westbound, between Longueville Road and Centennial Avenue, and between Sam Johnson Way and Mowbray Road West, has two general traffic lanes and one bus lane. Between Centennial Avenue and Sam Johnson Way it has one general traffic lane and one bus lane.

Right turn lanes were reinstated for westbound traffic at the intersection of Parklands Avenue and Centennial Avenue, Lane Cove. Street lighting was upgraded. As the final construction activity, Epping Road between Mowbray Road and Pacific Highway was resurfaced with new asphalt and new line marking.

These changes were considered in the 2001 Environmental Impact Statement (EIS) and are part of the Planning Minister's 2003 approval. They have been supported by a more recent Parliamentary Inquiry.

The measures were designed to try to overcome the disconnection of the local community resulting from the extensive road work – reinstating right hand lanes, adding pedestrian crossings and making improvements to public transport infrastructure. Extensive community consultation was undertaken.

=== Defects ===
In July 2022, it was revealed there was cracking found in sections of both the east and westbound tunnel roof, with the owner Transurban taking the builders to court for remediation. It was estimated that the total repair cost would be $300 million and it would take decades to repair as the work can only be undertaken during periods of overnight maintenance shutdowns.

== See also ==
- Freeways in Australia
- Freeways in Sydney
