= Naremburn =

- Suburb
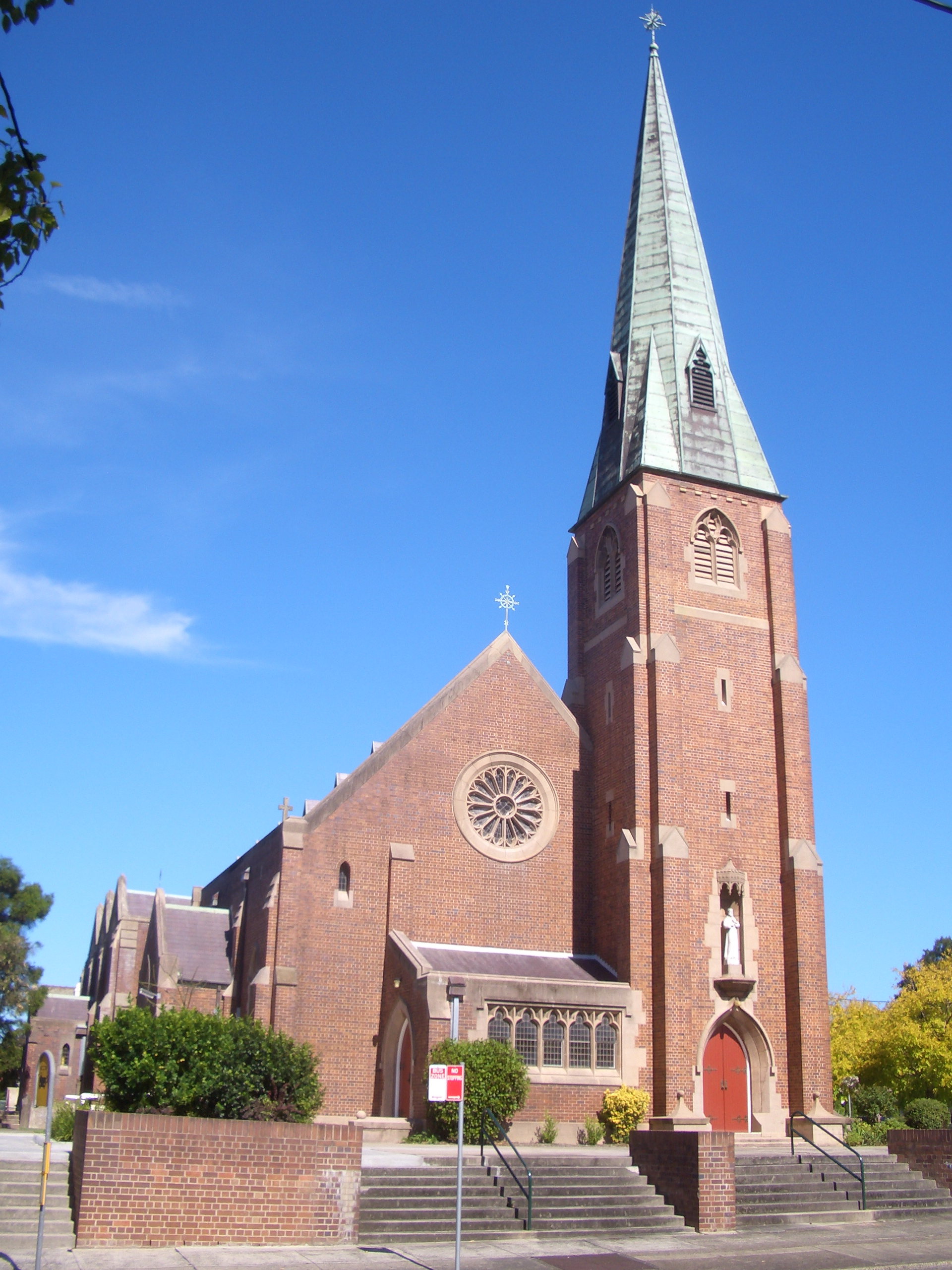
- St Leonards Catholic Church, Naremburn

- Interactive map of Naremburn
- Coordinates: 33°49′09″S 151°11′59″E
- Country: Australia
- State: New South Wales
- City: Sydney
- LGA: City of Willoughby
- Location: 6 km (3.7 mi) north of Sydney CBD
- Established: 1853

Government
  - State electorate: Willoughby
  - Federal division: Bradfield

Area
  - Total: 1.71 km^{2} (0.66 sq mi)
- Elevation: 74 m (243 ft)

Population
  - Total: 5,924 (2021 census)
  - Density: 3,464/km^{2} (8,973/sq mi)
- Postcode: 2065
Suburbs around Naremburn
Willoughby	Northbridge	Northbridge
Artarmon	Naremburn	Cammeray
St Leonards	Crows Nest	Cammeray

Naremburn is a suburb on the lower North Shore of Sydney, New South Wales, Australia. Naremburn is located 6 kilometres north of the Sydney central business district, in the local government area of the City of Willoughby.

== History ==
The suburb name dates to the 1800s but its origin cannot be verified. Theories suggest it derives from Merrenburn, the Scottish word burn (stream), or an Aboriginal term such as narra burren (forked creek). Naremburn was originally known as Central Township. The earliest land grants in the area were granted to Humphrey Evans and Peter Dargan in 1794.

Naremburn Post Office opened on 20 March 1882 and closed in 1996.

== Population ==
In the 2021 Census, there were 5,924 people in Naremburn. 62.2% of people were born in Australia. The next most common countries of birth were England 5.7%, China (without SARs and Taiwan) 3.5%, New Zealand 2.1%, India 2.1% and Hong Kong 2.0%. 73.6% of people only spoke English at home. Other languages spoken at home included Mandarin 4.2%, Cantonese 4.0%, Japanese 1.5%, Spanish 1.2% and Arabic 1.1%. The most common responses for religion were No Religion 45.7%, Catholic 22.7%, Anglican 11.4% and Buddhism 2.4%.

== Commercial area ==
Naremburn has a small shopping strip on Willoughby Road about ten minutes' walk from Crows Nest.

== Churches ==
- St Leonards Catholic Church, built in 1913
- St Cuthberts Anglican Church (Naremburn Cammeray Anglican Church)

== Former primary schools ==
Until the 1990s, there were two primary schools operating – St Leonard's Catholic Primary School, and, Naremburn Public School – both on Willoughby Road. The Catholic school shared the same site as the adjacent Catholic church, and, the public school was located opposite on Willoughby Road. Changing demographics and corresponding lack of demand led to both schools being closed within five years of each other. The former Catholic school is now a creative arts learning centre. The former public school is now a housing development.

== Transport ==
Bus routes 114 from Balmoral and 115 from North Sydney CBD travel through Naremburn to Chatswood, with stops located along Willoughby Road.

The closest railway station is St Leonards railway station on the Northern and North Shore & Western Lines of the Sydney Trains network.

The Warringah Freeway to the city runs through the suburb.

== Gallery ==
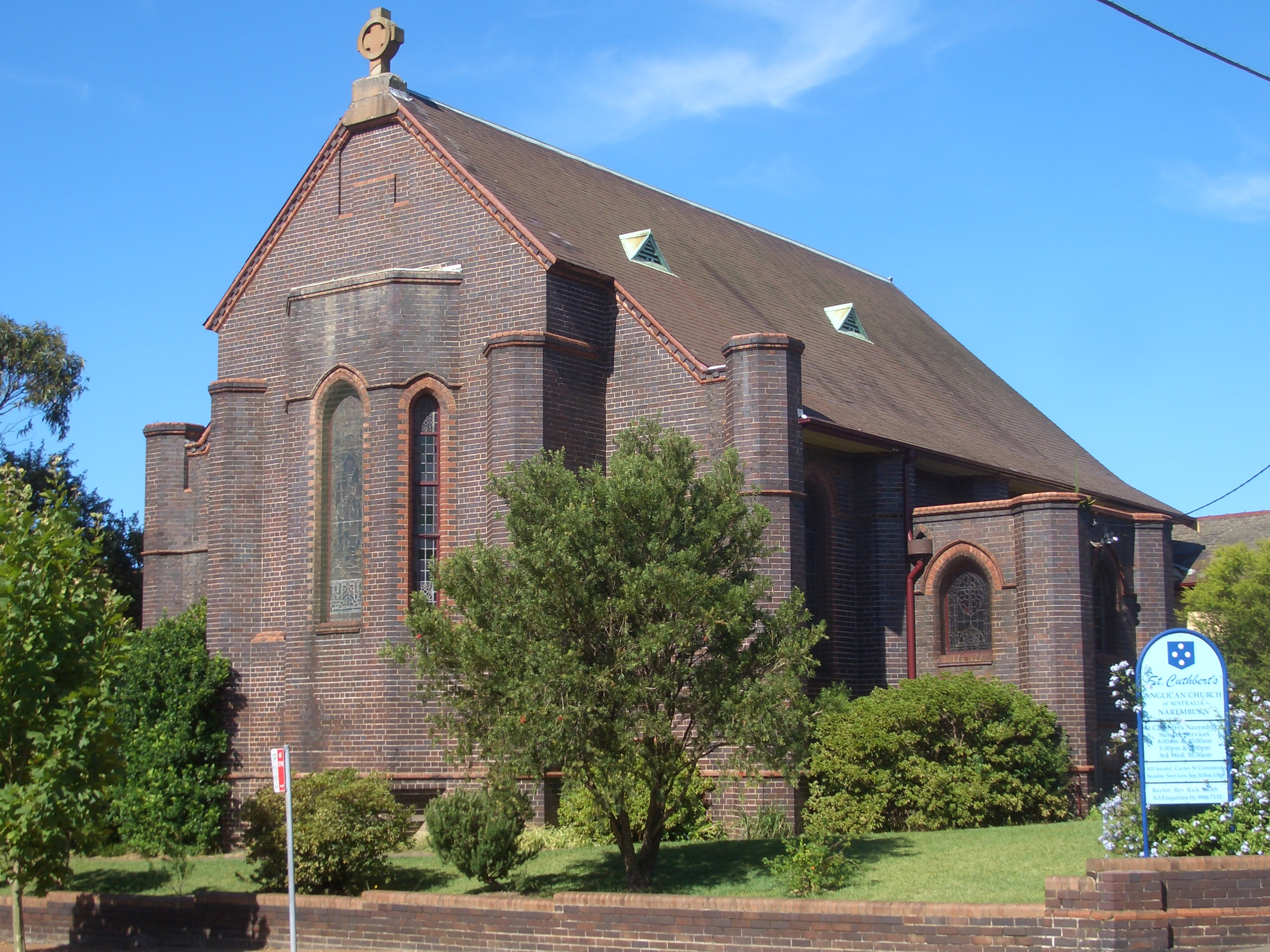
St Cuthberts Anglican Church

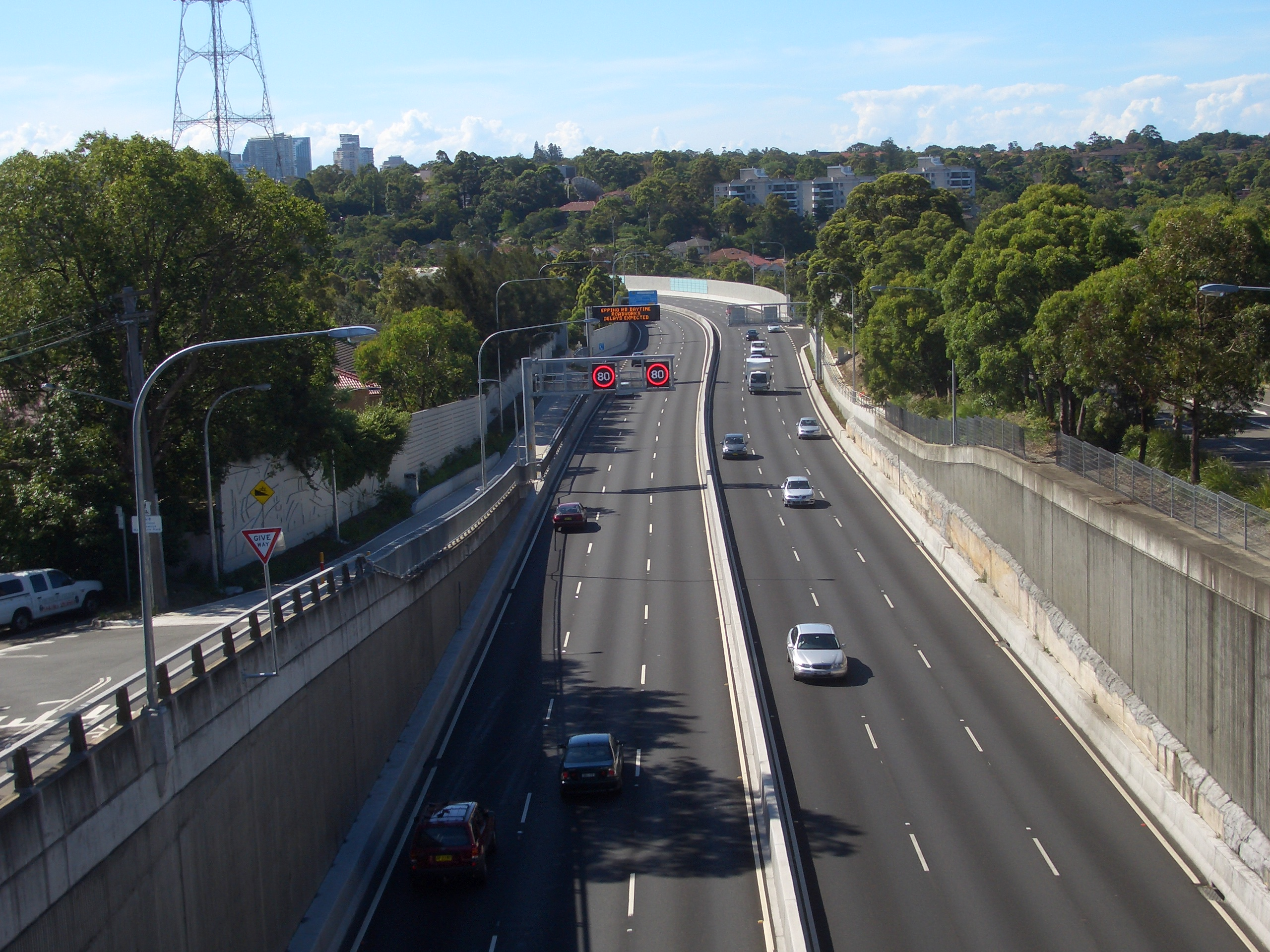
Warringah Freeway

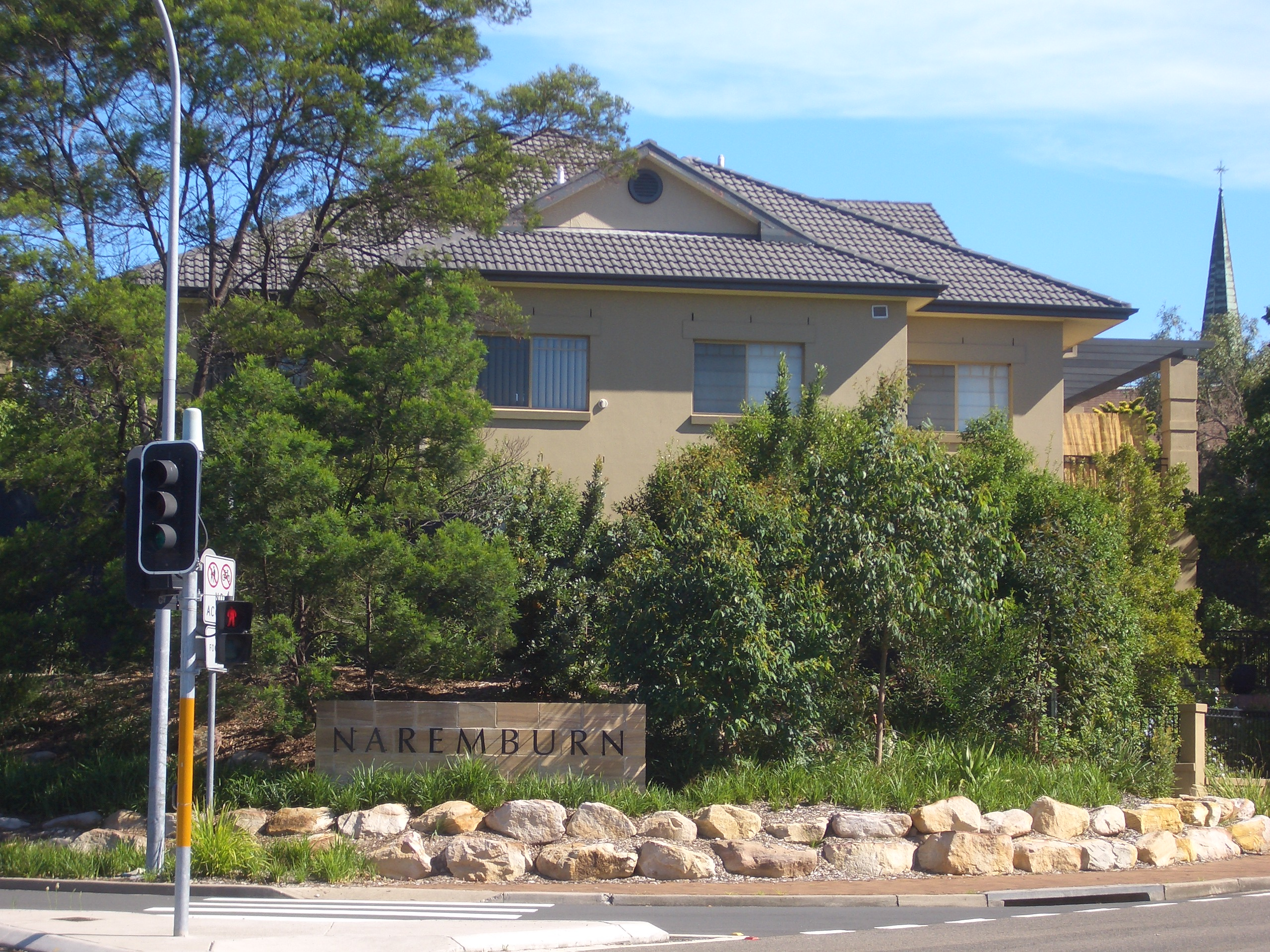
Willoughby Road
