= Cammeray =

- Suburb
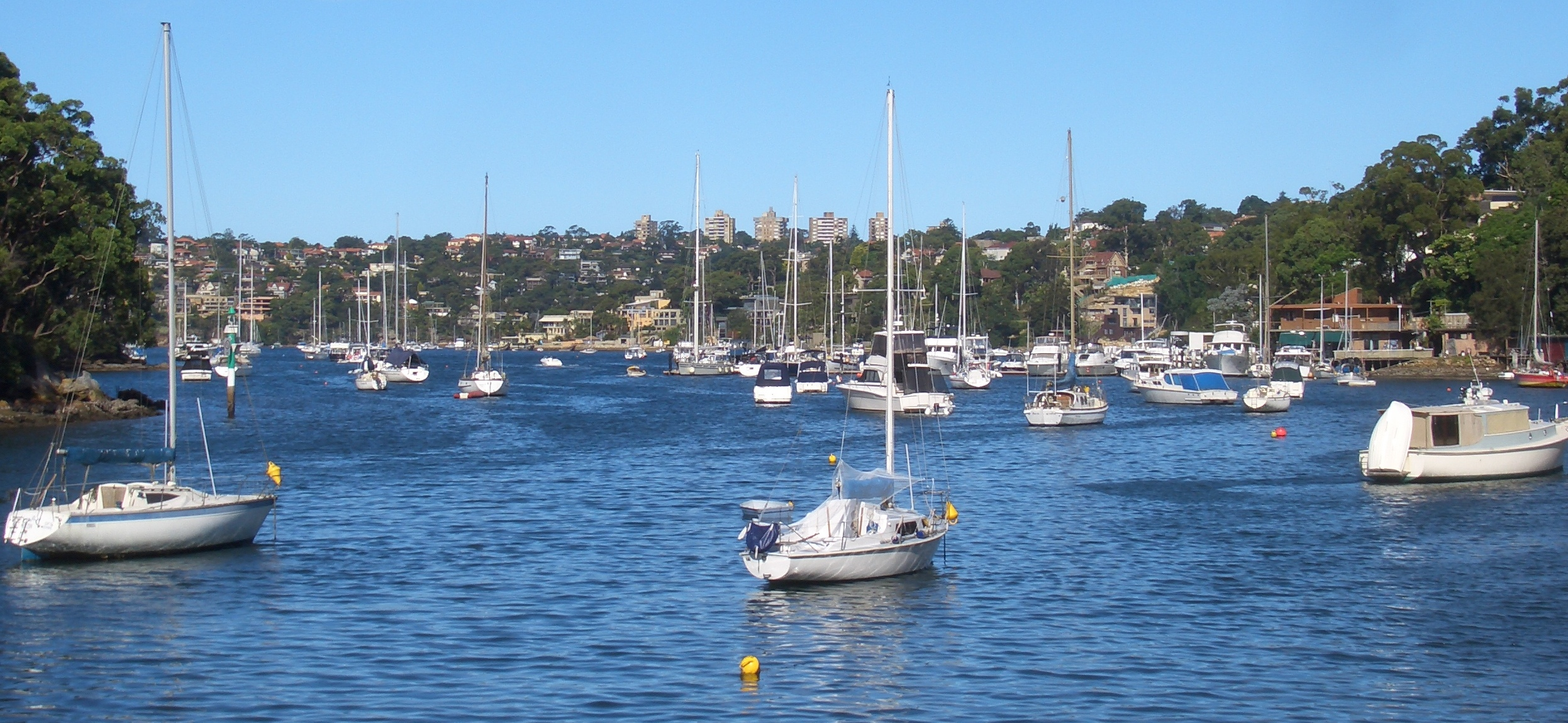
- Cammeray from Willoughby Bay

- Interactive map of Cammeray
- Country: Australia
- State: New South Wales
- City: Sydney
- LGA: North Sydney Council
- Location: 5 km (3.1 mi) north of Sydney CBD

Government
  - State electorate: Willoughby
  - Federal divisions: Warringah; Bradfield

Area
  - Total: 1.5 km^{2} (0.58 sq mi)
- Elevation: 87 m (285 ft)

Population
  - Total: 7,088 (2021 census)
  - Density: 4,730/km^{2} (12,200/sq mi)
- Postcode: 2062
Suburbs around Cammeray
Naremburn	Northbridge	Mosman
Crows Nest	Cammeray	Cremorne
Crows Nest	North Sydney	Neutral Bay

Cammeray is a residential suburb on the Lower North Shore region of Northern Sydney and is part of the North Sydney Council local government area.

== History ==
=== Aboriginal culture ===
Cammeray is named after the Cammeraygal people, a First Nations group on the Lower North Shore. Radiometric dating (carbon dating) indicates that indigenous peoples lived in the Cammeray area at least 5,800 years ago. Aboriginal shell middens have been discovered at Folly Point and cave paintings in Primrose Park.

=== European settlement ===
Prior to the 1920s, the suburb was known as Suspension Bridge reflecting the now Long Gully Bridge that joined Northbridge to Cammeray. Cammeray was slow to develop mainly due to its steep topography and remoteness from transport.

Despite the land boom of the 1880s and plans for a suspension bridge across Flat Rock Creek, development in the Cammeray area was mostly confined to the south of the suburb with some boatmen's houses on Folly Point. The rest of the district was very rural consisting of bushland, dairies and market gardens. Cammeray was also the site of Sydney's first quarry, with sandstone blocks from the quarry making many of the first buildings in Sydney town.

An Australian politician and solicitor, Joseph Palmer Abbott, built Tarella, a two-storey Italianate mansion in Amherst Street, c. 1886, on land he had acquired in 1881. Palmer Street in Cammeray was named after him. Tarella includes a coachhouse at the rear, with a distinctive clock tower. It is listed with the Heritage Council of New South Wales.

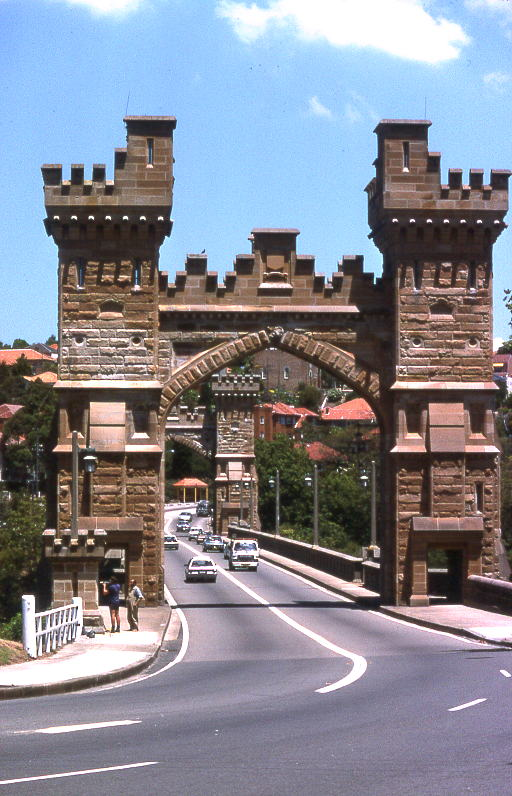
Long Gully Bridge

In 1892, a suspension bridge was built as a private initiative by the North Sydney Investment and Tramway Company, to attract buyers for new residential allotments on the north side of Long Bay. In 1914, the first tram crossed the bridge, conveniently linking the new suburb and beautiful Middle Harbour peninsulas to the more developed parts of North Sydney. Land sales revived in 1909 when the tramway along Miller Street was built, with a string of subdivisions opening up, including the Bell's Estate (1909). In the mid 1930s faults were discovered in the bridge's steel cables and anchorages in the rock below so public transport was interrupted with passengers having to walk across the bridge as trams waited on either side.

Estates established in the 1920s and 30s included the Morning Glow Estate (1921), Cammeray Estate (1932) and Green's Estate (1935). By the 1940s motor transport made the area more accessible and many waterfront houses were built. The last substantial subdivision in Cammeray was of the "Three Oaks Dairy‟ in 1942. It is recorded, however, that as late as 1958 dairy cattle still grazed at Cammeray.

=== Development ===
In the 1960s Cammeray's residential progress was interrupted when the Warringah Expressway cut through most of North Sydney including Cammeray. Portions of St Thomas' Cemetery and Cammeray Park were resumed, as well as numerous houses, particularly in the area between Falcon and Amherst Streets. The Warringah Expressway also divides Cammeray, with the only crossing points being at West, Miller, Ernest and Falcon Streets.

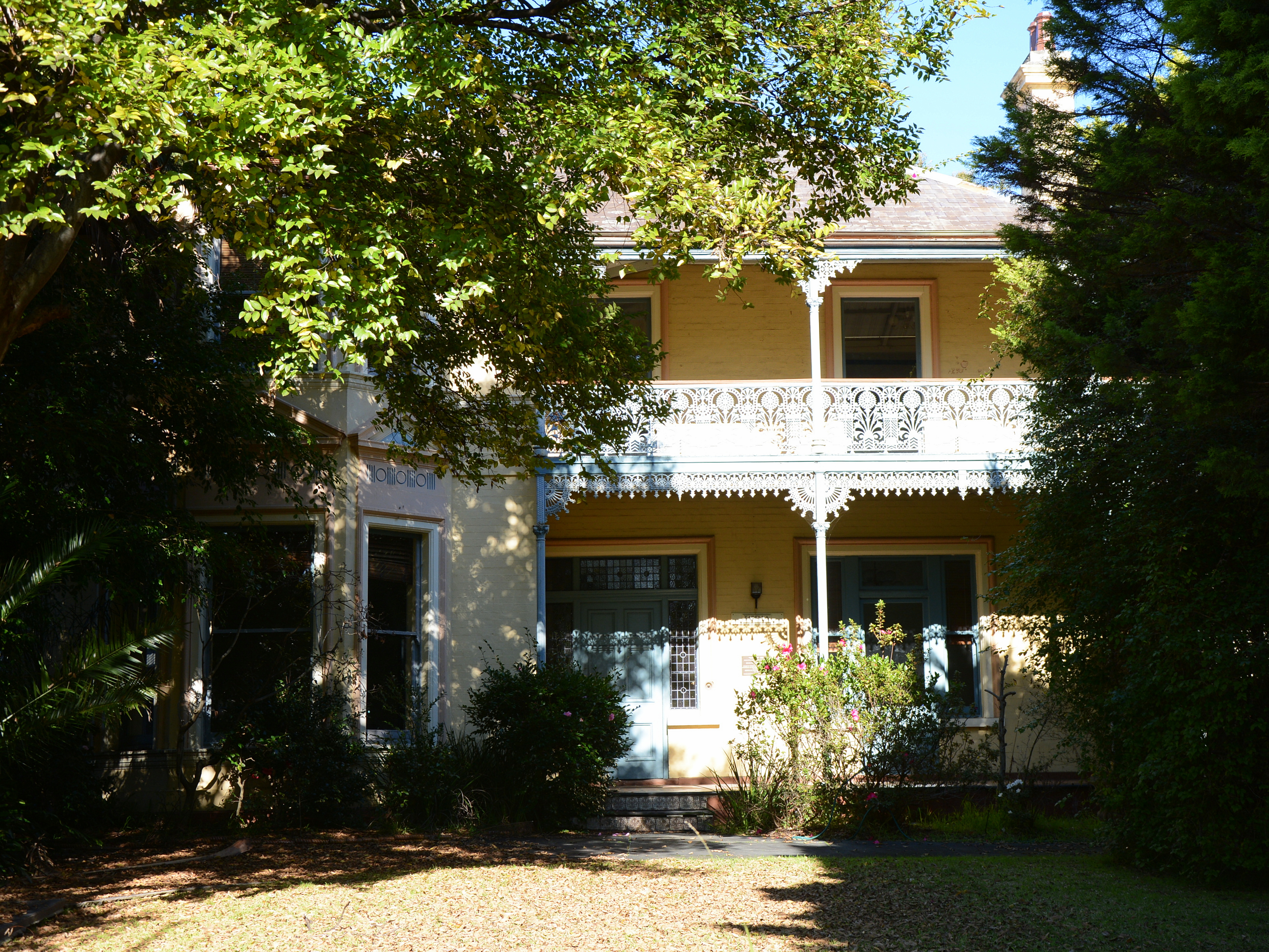
Tarella

Amherst Street was named after William Pitt Amherst, who was Governor-General of India from 1823 to 1828. Heritage listings include Tarella at 3 Amherst Street and the Cammeray Substation at 143 Bellevue Street.

== Demographics ==
According to the 2021 census of Population, there were 7,088 residents in Cammeray. In Cammeray, 65.1% of people were born in Australia. The most common countries of birth were England 6.2%, New Zealand 2.4%, China 1.9%, South Africa 1.7% and India 1.6%. 79.5% of people only spoke English at home. The next most common language spoken at home was Mandarin at 2.5%. The most common responses for religion in Cammeray were No Religion 44.5%, Catholic 23.4% and Anglican 12.5%.

== Commercial area ==
Miller Street is the main commercial thoroughfare of Cammeray with restaurants, cafes, the local post office, a petrol station and small businesses. Cammeray Square is a modern shopping and residential complex on Miller Street, and adjacent to Green Park on Cammeray Road is a small business precinct giving the local area a village feel.

== Transport ==
With close proximity to the Sydney CBD and the Warringah expressway Cammeray's location provides easy private and public access to all directions. Public transport is provided by Busways bus services with Cammeray being the last south-bound stop for services to the Sydney CBD via the Warringah Freeway. Buses to North Sydney, Milsons Point and Crows Nest are also available.

== Schools ==
Cammeray has two public schools catering for students from Kindergarten to Year 6. Cammeray Public School is situated on the northern side of the suburb and Anzac Park Public School, which opened in 2016, is located more to the south.

== Churches ==
All Saints' Anglican church on Carter Street is the only church in Cammeray. It is part of the Naremburn Cammeray Anglican Church.

== Residential ==
Cammeray has a mix of private and public apartments and dwellings with 75.8% medium and high density in 2016. 23.3% of all dwellings were separate houses; 35.5% were medium density dwellings and 40.2% were in high density dwellings, compared with 10.2%, 25.0%, and 64.2% in the North Sydney Council area respectively.

== Sport, parks and recreation ==
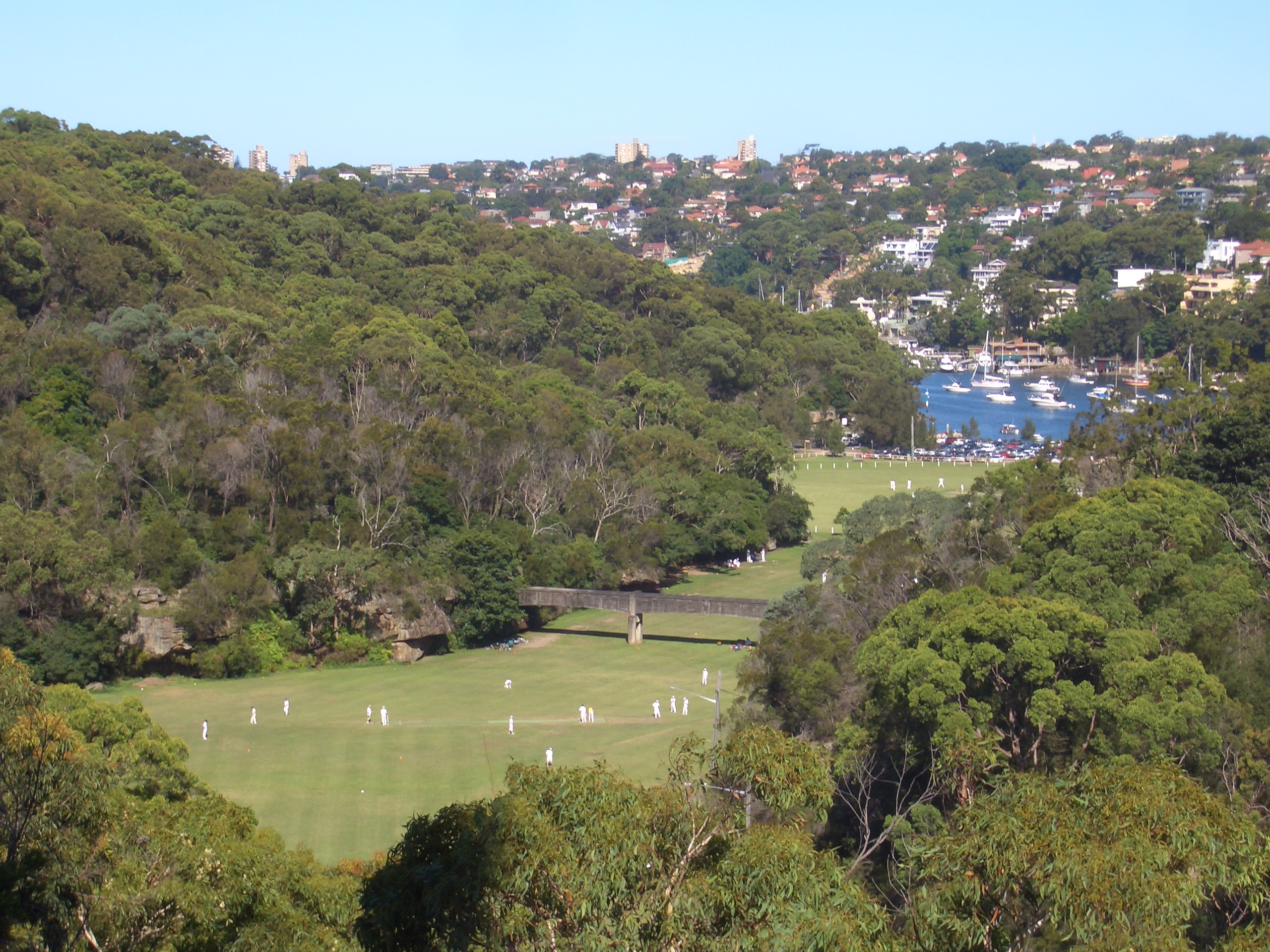
Tunks Park

Cammeray offers a range of sports clubs, facilities and open spaces for soccer, rugby, tennis and crochet and the surrounding natural bushland and Middle Harbour provides for bushwalking and boating activities. Primrose and Tunks Parks are the largest recreation and sporting areas that are surrounded by bushland and Middle Harbour. They are popular exercise and dog walking spaces with picnic areas, playgrounds and bushwalking tracks that lead from Primrose park to Foley Point and Tunks park to Naremburn on the west and Northbridge on the north. A public boat ramp allows small boats to enter Middle Harbour.

St Thomas Rest Park is another green space that also holds a historic cemetery on West St. It includes the grave of Owen Stanley.

Cammeray Park is a large green space at the southern part of Cammeray that offers an all year round synthetic turf field for soccer, private tennis courts and a skate park. It also contains Cammeray Golf Club that is a 9-hole public course.

Green Park is an urban open grass area that is used for recreational activities and dog walking. It also has two public tennis courts and a child care centre.

Anzac Park is a smaller open space that is mainly used for picnicking and dog walking and has a large community garden. The western area houses a grove of turpentine trees with plaques that surround North Sydney War Memorial that represent the Australian service women and men who participated in various theatres during World War II.

Several cycling paths exist in Cammeray including paths that connect to Chatswood via The Artarmon Link Path (Cordia Way) and to Sydney CBD via the Harbour Bridge.

== Notable people ==
- Ben Fordham-news reporter
- Jodie Speers-journalist
- April Pengilly-actress, model
