= List of road routes in New South Wales (numeric) =

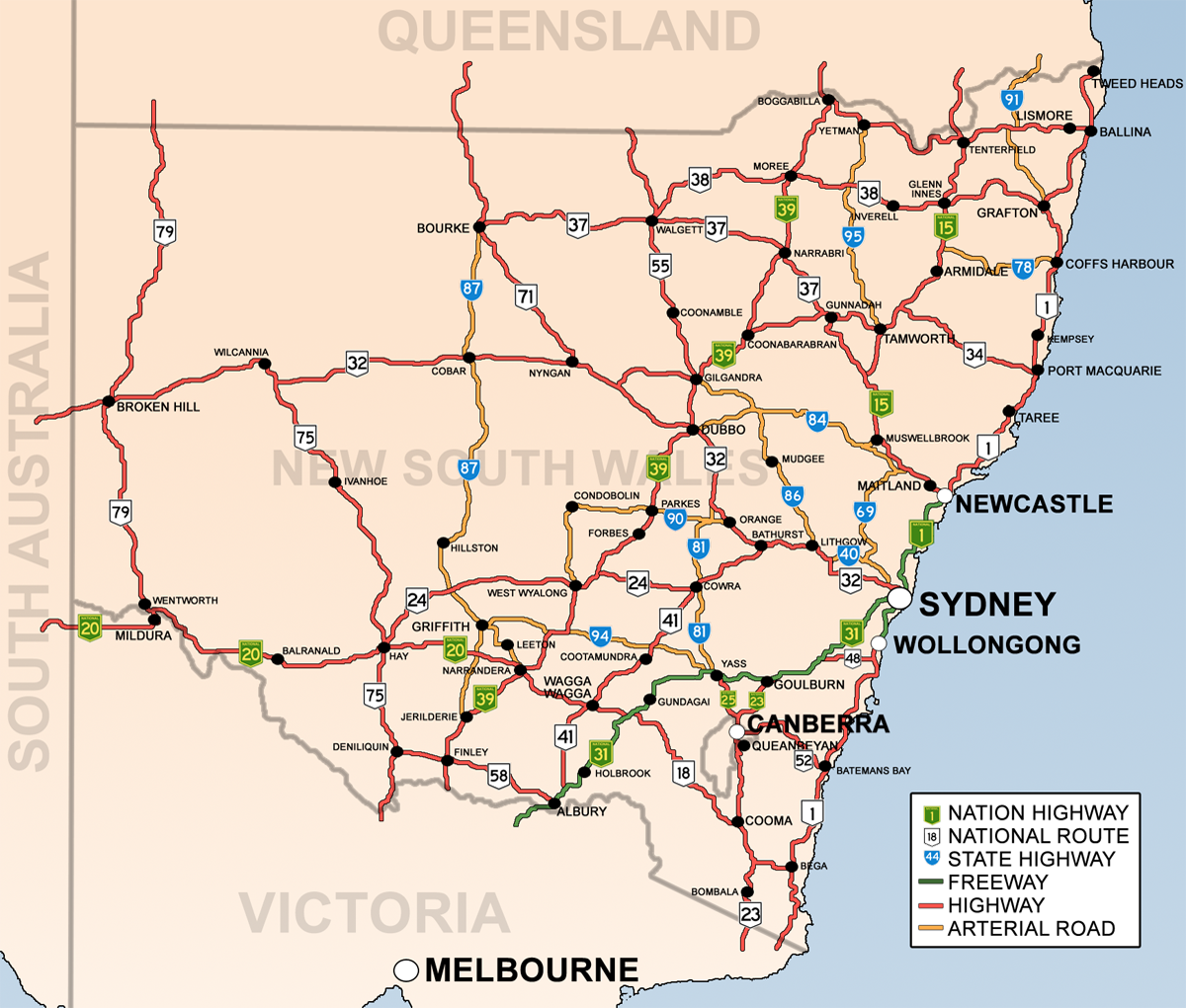
Road routes in New South Wales pre-alphanumeric (until 2013)

Road routes in New South Wales assist drivers navigating roads throughout the state, as roads may change names several times between destinations, or have a second local name in addition to a primary name. New South Wales previously used an older, numerical shield-based system (which this article focuses on) until 2013, when it was completely replaced (except for Tourist Routes) with a newer, alphanumeric system.

New South Wales implemented the federally-issued National Routes system between 1954 and 1955, using white-and-black shields highlighting interstate links between major regional centres; some of these routes were later upgraded into National Highways using green-and-gold shields when the National Roads Act was passed in 1974.

Sydney's initial shield system was the Ring Road system, with three routes rolled out in 1964. These were eventually replaced by a specialised Freeway Routes system in 1973, and a state-wide shield-based numbering scheme, allocating blue-and-white shields across Sydney in 1974, numbered to fit around existing National Routes, with separate allocations for rural New South Wales, the Hunter (Greater Newcastle) and Illawarra (Greater Wollongong) regions; this system received sporadic updates throughout the 1990s and 2000s. These were augmented by the Metroad system in 1992–93, with its blue-on-white hexagonal shields identifying major routes through Sydney, with additional routes added through the late 1990s.

The new alphanumeric system, introduced in 2013, has now replaced the previous scheme across the entire state. It consists of alphanumeric routes, a one-to-three digit number prefixed with a letter (M, A, B, or D) that denotes the grade and importance of the road, and (apart from Tourist Routes) is now the state's only road route numbering system.

Some routes, in part or in their entirety, may have been made obsolete by the alphanumeric designation: these replacement routes are noted but not listed in full here. Some also may follow older alignments or routes later changed even after the new system was introduced, and are included here for the sake of completion. Roads are described in either a west–east or north–south alignment.

== National Routes ==
National Routes were the first type of route numbering to be attempted in Australia on a large scale, signed with a white shield and black writing (similar in shape to the shield that appears on the Australian coat of arms), with New South Wales receiving routes in 1954. They highlighted the interstate links connecting major population, industrial and principal regions of New South Wales to the rest of the Australia, in a way that was readily identifiable to interstate travellers. The system was prepared by COSRA (Conference of State Road Authorities), held between 1953 and 1954: once each state road authority agreed to the scheme, it was rolled out federally.

In 1954, the Hume Highway was trialled as National Route 31, chosen due to its prominence as a transport corridor connecting Australia's largest cities (Sydney and Melbourne). Soon after, other National Routes across the state were allocated. Selected routes were later upgraded into National Highways when the National Roads Act was passed in 1974.

New South Wales' National Routes were initially replaced within the boundaries of Sydney with the Metroad system in 1992–93, and eventually replaced entirely across the state by the alphanumeric system in 2013: each route was converted to an alphanumeric route number, rendering the previous shields redundant. Many National Routes across New South Wales were renumbered during the conversion, while some others were not replaced at all and became unsigned.

Route	Component roads	From	Via	To	Length	Notes
National Route 1	Pacific Highway (I) (Tweed Heads section)	NSW/Qld border	Tweed Heads; Ballina; Grafton; Coffs Harbour; Kempsey; Hexham; Wahroonga; Sydney; Heathcote; West Wollongong; Kiama; Nowra; Batemans Bay; Bega; Eden	NSW/Vic border	1,466 km (911 mi)	Reallocated along Tweed Heads bypass when it opened in 1992, later replaced by when Tugun Bypass opened in 2008, renamed Gold Coast Highway in 2009
National Route 1	Pacific Highway (II) (North Coast section); New England Highway	NSW/Qld border	Tweed Heads; Ballina; Grafton; Coffs Harbour; Kempsey; Hexham; Wahroonga; Sydney; Heathcote; West Wollongong; Kiama; Nowra; Batemans Bay; Bega; Eden	NSW/Vic border	1,466 km (911 mi)	Progressively reallocated along Pacific Motorway sections as they opened, replaced by /
National Route 1	Pacific Highway (III) (Central Coast section); Sydney–Newcastle Freeway	NSW/Qld border	Tweed Heads; Ballina; Grafton; Coffs Harbour; Kempsey; Hexham; Wahroonga; Sydney; Heathcote; West Wollongong; Kiama; Nowra; Batemans Bay; Bega; Eden	NSW/Vic border	1,466 km (911 mi)	Construction of Sydney–Newcastle Freeway sections bypassing Pacific Highway built between Berowra and Ourimbah between 1964 and 1973 (old alignments eventually allocated in 1979), entire freeway replaced by in 1974 (and progressively extended at both ends until 1998)
National Route 1	Pacific Highway (IV) (Sydney section); Gore Hill Freeway; Warringah Freeway; Sydney Harbour Tunnel; Cahill Expressway; Palmer/Bourke Streets (s/bound); Campbell/Crown Streets/Sir John Young Crescent (n/bound); Flinders Street; South Dowling Street; Southern Cross Drive; General Holmes Drive; The Grand Parade; President Avenue; Princes Highway (I) (Sydney section)	NSW/Qld border	Tweed Heads; Ballina; Grafton; Coffs Harbour; Kempsey; Hexham; Wahroonga; Sydney; Heathcote; West Wollongong; Kiama; Nowra; Batemans Bay; Bega; Eden	NSW/Vic border	1,466 km (911 mi)	– re-aligned through North Sydney from Pacific Highway to Berry/Arthur/Mount Streets (one-way southbound) and Pacific Highway (one-way northbound) when the Warringah Freeway opened in 1968; – re-aligned through central Sydney from Pacific and Bradfield Highways, York and George Streets, Broadway, City Road, King Street and Princes Highway to York Street (one-way southbound) and Clarence Street (one-way northbound) in 1972; – re-aligned through central Sydney from York/Clarence and George Streets to Western Distributor, Harris Street and Broadway in 1986; – re-aligned through central Sydney from Harris Street to Wattle/Fig Streets (one-way northbound) and Harris Street (one-way southbound) when the Fig Street Connection opened in 1990; – re-aligned through northern, central and southern Sydney from Pacific and Bradfield Highways, Western Distributor, Wattle/Fig/Harris Streets, Broadway, City Road, King Street and Princes Highway, to current alignment when Gore Hill Freeway and Sydney Harbour Tunnel opened in 1992; – replaced by in 1993
National Route 1	Princes Motorway; Princes Highway (II) (South Coast section)	NSW/Qld border	Tweed Heads; Ballina; Grafton; Coffs Harbour; Kempsey; Hexham; Wahroonga; Sydney; Heathcote; West Wollongong; Kiama; Nowra; Batemans Bay; Bega; Eden	NSW/Vic border	1,466 km (911 mi)	Progressively reallocated along Princes Motorway sections as they opened, replaced by /
Alternative National Route 1	George Street; Bridge Road; Jersey Street North	Asquith		Hornsby	2.6 km (2 mi)	Alternative route through Hornsby (east of railway line): allocated 1975, replaced by when Sydney-Newcastle Freeway extended to Wahroonga in 1989
Alternative National Route 1	Princes Highway	Waterfall	Bulli; Wollongong; Unanderra	Dapto	57 km (35 mi)	Former route through Wollongong: allocated 1975, replaced by in 1989
National Route 15	New England Highway	NSW/Qld border	Tenterfield; Glen Innes; Armidale; Bendemeer; Tamworth; Muswellbrook; Singleton; Branxton; Maitland	Hexham	584 km (363 mi)	– replaced by in 1974 – concurrency with along Oxley Highway from Bendemeer to Tamworth
National Route 16	Murray Valley Highway	Euston		NSW/Vic border	3 km (2 mi)	Decommissioned in 2013, now unallocated
National Route 18	Snowy Mountains Highway	Mount Adrah	Adelong; Tumut; Adaminaby; Cooma; Steeple Flat	Stony Creek	333 km (207 mi)	– replaced by – concurrency with along Monaro Highway from Cooma to Steeple Flat
National Route 20	Sturt Highway	NSW/Vic border	Buronga; Balranald; Hay South; Darlington Point; Narrandera; Wagga Wagga	Tarcutta	597 km (371 mi)	– replaced by in 1992 – concurrency with along Olympic Highway from Moorong to Wagga Wagga
National Route 23	Federal Highway	Yarra	Collector; Sutton	NSW/ACT border	55 km (34 mi)	Replaced by in 1974
National Route 23	Monaro Highway	NSW/ACT border	Michelago; Cooma; Steeple Flat; Bombala	NSW/Vic border	206 km (128 mi)	– replaced by – concurrency with along Snowy Mountains Highway from Cooma to Steeple Flat
National Route 24	Mid-Western Highway	Hay	Goolgowi; West Wyalong; Grenfell; Cowra	Bathurst	518 km (322 mi)	– replaced by: from Hay to Cowra; from Cowra to Bathurst – concurrency with along Newell Highway from West Wyalong to Caragabal
National Route 25	Barton Highway	Yass	Murrumbateman	NSW/ACT border	40 km (25 mi)	Allocated when road sealing and upgrades completed in 1956, replaced by in 1974
National Route 31	Hume Highway	Haberfield	Liverpool; Camden; Aylmerton; Yarra; Yass; Tarcutta; Table Top; Albury	NSW/Vic border	543 km (337 mi)	– re-aligned through Camden when Camden bypass opened in 1974 – replaced along Hume Highway from Casula to the border by in 1974, allocation from Haberfield to Casula left as – replaced from Haberfield to Chullora, and from Liverpool to Casula, by when allocated in 1993, unallocated otherwise – replaced from Warwick Farm to Casula by (replacing), and from Chullora to Warwick Farm by, when Casula bypass opened in 1994 – replaced from Haberfield to Chullora by (replacing) when M5 East Motorway opened in 2001 – replaced by: from Haberfield to Warwick Farm; from Warwick Farm to Prestons
National Route 32	Barrier Highway; Mitchell Highway; Great Western Highway	NSW/SA border	Broken Hill; Wilcannia; Cobar; Nyngan; Dubbo; Orange; Bathurst; Lithgow; Katoomba	Lapstone	1,146 km (712 mi)	– allocation originally along entire length of Great Western Highway and Parramatta Road through Sydney to Ultimo – progressively reallocated along M4 Motorway as sections opened (older allocations along Great Western Highway replaced by) – truncated to Emu Plains, and replaced along M4 Motorway by, in 1992 – truncated further back to Lapstone when M4 Motorway extension opened in 1993 – replaced by
National Route 34	Oxley Highway	Nevertire	Gilgandra; Coonabarabran; Gunnedah; Tamworth; Bendemeer; Walcha	Port Macquarie	645 km (401 mi)	– replaced by from Coonabarabran to Port Macquarie, unallocated otherwise – concurrency with along New England Highway from Tamworth to Bendemeer
National Route 37	Kamilaroi Highway	Bourke	Brewarrina; Walgett; Wee Waa; Narrabri; Gunnedah; Quirindi	Willow Tree	597 km (371 mi)	– allocated in 1974 from Narrabri to Willow Tree, western end extended to Bourke in 1999 – replaced by: from Bourke to Walgett; from Narrabri to Willow Tree; unallocated otherwise
National Route 38	Gwydir Highway	Walgett	Moree; Warialda; Inverell; Glen Innes	South Grafton	568 km (353 mi)	– allocated in 1962 from Collarenebri to South Grafton, western end extended to Walgett in 1993 – replaced by
National Route 39	Newell Highway	NSW/Qld border	Moree; Narrabri; Coonabarabran; Gilgandra; Dubbo; Parkes; West Wyalong; Narrandera; Finley; Tocumwal	NSW/Vic border	1,058 km (657 mi)	– allocated in 1962, replaced by in 1992 – concurrencies: with along Mid-Western Highway from Caragabal to West Wyalong; with along Burley Griffin Way from Mirrool to Ardlethan
National Route 41	Olympic Highway	Cowra	Young; Cootamundra; Junee; Wagga Wagga	Table Top	317 km (197 mi)	– allocated in 1974, replaced by – concurrency with along Sturt Highway from Wagga Wagga to Moorong
National Route 43	Balranald-Tooleybuc Road	Balranald	Tooleybuc	NSW/Vic border	49 km (30 mi)	Decommissioned in early 2000s, allocation never properly signed as parts of it were not initially sealed
National Route 44	Bruxner Highway	Tenterfield	Casino; Lismore	West Ballina	185 km (115 mi)	Allocated in 1974, replaced by
National Route 46	Carnarvon Highway	NSW/Qld border	Mungindi	Moree	120 km (75 mi)	Allocated in 1997, decommissioned in 2013, now unallocated
National Route 48	Illawarra Highway	Sutton Forest	Moss Vale; Robertson; Albion Park	Albion Park Rail	62 km (39 mi)	Allocated in 1974, replaced by
National Route 52	Canberra Avenue; Farrer Place; Monaro Street; Bungendore Road; Kings Highway	NSW/ACT border	Queanbeyan	NSW/ACT border	12.4 km (8 mi)	– allocated in 1974 – re-aligned through Queanbeyan from Uriarra Road and Crawford Street (and Norse Road in ACT) to current alignment (eliminating level crossing with Bombala railway line) in 1982 – replaced by
National Route 52	Kings Highway	NSW/ACT border	Bungendore; Braidwood	Batemans Bay	115 km (71 mi)	– allocated in 1974, replaced by
National Route 55	Castlereagh Highway	NSW/Qld border	Walgett; Coonamble	Gilgandra	343 km (213 mi)	– allocated in 1974 from Walgett to Gilgandra, northern end extended to NSW/Qld border in 1983 – replaced by
National Route 58	Riverina Highway	Deniliquin	Finley; Berrigan; Howlong; Albury; Lake Hume Village	NSW/Vic border	228 km (142 mi)	Allocated in 1974, replaced by from Deniliquin to Albury, unallocated otherwise
National Route 71	Mitchell Highway	NSW/Qld border	Enngonia; Bourke	Nyngan	339 km (211 mi)	Replaced by
National Route 75	Cobb Highway	Wilcannia	Ivanhoe; Hay; Deniliquin; Moama	NSW/Vic border	571 km (355 mi)	Replaced by
National Route 79	Silver City Highway; Calder Highway	NSW/Qld border	Tibooburra; Milparinka; Broken Hill; Wentworth; Curlwaa	NSW/Vic border	636 km (395 mi)	Replaced by between NSW/Qld border and Curlwaa: while allocation originally continued into Victoria, detours to terminate in Buronga
Decommissioned or unsigned route

== National Highways ==
With the passing of the National Roads Act in 1974, selected National Routes were further upgraded to the status of a National Highway: interstate roads linking Australia's capital cities and major regional centres that received federal funding, and were of higher importance than other National Routes. These new routes were symbolised by green shields with gold writing, and the word "National" along the top of the shield. Most of New South Wales' National Highways were declared in 1974 and their shields converted in the following years, with National Highways 20 and 39 later declared in 1992.

Like National Routes, New South Wales' National Highways were also replaced with the alphanumeric system, introduced across the state in 2013: each route was converted to an alphanumeric route number, with all keeping their number during the conversion.

Route	Component roads	From	Via	To	Length	Notes
National Highway 1	Sydney–Newcastle Freeway	Beresfield	Morisset; Tuggerah; Mooney Mooney; Berowra	Wahroonga	127 km (79 mi)	Progressively reallocated along Sydney–Newcastle Freeway (F3) sections (already existing between Ourimbah–Berowra when replaced in 1974) as they opened: – re-aligned from Pacific Highway (Kangy Angy–Doyalson, replaced by) when freeway's Kangy Angy–Wallarah stage and Motorway Link (Wallarah–Doyalson) opened in 1983 – re-aligned from Motorway Link and Pacific Highway (Wallarah–Newcastle, replaced by) to Freemans/Leggetts Drives (concurrency with), Leggetts Drive, Stamford/Railway Streets to Kurri Kurri (concurrency with), Tarro/Mulbring Streets and John Renshaw Drive (concurrency with) when freeway's Mandalong–Freemans Waterhole stage opened in 1988 – re-aligned from Pacific Highway (Berowra–Wahroonga) when freeway's replacement stage opened in 1989 – re-aligned from Freemans/Leggetts Drives, Stamford/Railway/Tarro/Mulbring Streets and John Renshaw Drive (Freemans Waterhole-Beresfield) to Lenaghans Drive when freeway's Ryhope–Minmi stage opened in 1993 – re-aligned from Pacific Highway (Ourimbah–Kangy Angy) when freeway's replacement stage opened in 1997 – re-aligned from Lenaghans Drive (Minmi–Beresfield) to current alignment when freeway's final replacement stage opened in 1998 – replaced by, renamed Pacific Motorway
National Highway 15	New England Highway	NSW/Qld border	Tenterfield; Glen Innes; Armidale; Bendemeer; Tamworth; Muswellbrook; Singleton; Branxton; Maitland	Beresfield	578 km (359 mi)	– southern end truncated from Hexham to Beresfield when interim route via Kurri Kurri allocated in 1988 – replaced by, later by (from Lower Belford to Beresfield) when Hunter Expressway opened in 2014
National Highway 20	Sturt Highway	NSW/Vic border	Buronga; Balranald; Hay South; Darlington Point; Narrandera; Wagga Wagga	Tarcutta	597 km (371 mi)	Replaced by
National Highway 23	Federal Highway	Yarra	Collector; Sutton	NSW/ACT border	55 km (34 mi)	Replaced by
National Highway 25	Barton Highway	Yass	Murrumbateman	NSW/ACT border	40 km (25 mi)	Replaced by
National Highway 31	Hume Highway; South West Motorway	Prestons	Campbelltown; Aylmerton; Yarra; Yass; Tarcutta; Table Top; Albury	NSW/Vic border	543 km (337 mi)	Progressively reallocated along upgraded Hume Highway and South Western Freeway (F5) sections as they opened: – re-aligned from Hume Highway (Yanderra–Aylmerton, eventually replaced by in 1980), when freeway's replacement stage opened in 1977 – re-aligned from Hume Highway (Casula–Yanderra (replaced by) to South Western Freeway, when freeway's Campbelltown–Yanderra stage opened in 1980 – northern end extended from Casula to Prestons when Casula bypass opened in 1994, South Western Freeway renamed South West Motorway – signage along Hume Highway (from Berrima to the border) progressively replaced with, along Hume Highway and South West Motorway (from Prestons to Berrima) replaced with, from 1997 – northern end truncated from Prestons to Campbelltown (replaced by) when allocated in 1999 – northern end restored back to Prestons, South West Motorway renamed Hume Motorway (from Prestons to Berrima), officially replaced along entire allocation with in 2013
National Highway 39	Newell Highway	NSW/Qld border	Moree; Narrabri; Coonabarabran; Gilgandra; Dubbo; Parkes; West Wyalong; Narrandera; Finley; Tocumwal	NSW/Vic border	1,057 km (657 mi)	Replaced by
Decommissioned or unsigned route

== Metroads ==
These routes, characterised by their blue and white hexagonal shields, were phased in across Sydney between 1992 and 1993, better highlighting major routes into and around the city. A total of 9 routes existed, numbered from 1 to 10, covering Sydney's major radial and circumferential arteries. Metroad 4 was fully signed in December 1992, and Metroads 1, 2, 3, 5 and 7 followed in 1993. A second stage was rolled out a few years later: Metroads 9 and 10 were added in 1998, and Metroad 6 was added in 1999; there was no Metroad 8. These were eventually replaced with the alphanumeric system, introduced across the state in 2013: each route was converted to an alphanumeric route number, keeping their number during the conversion (with the exception of Metroad 10, which became A8).

Route	Component roads	From	Via	To	Length	Notes
Metroad 1	Pacific Highway	Wahroonga	Pymble; Chatswood; Artarmon; North Sydney; Darlinghurst; Zetland; Mascot; Kogarah; Blakehurst; Heathcote	Waterfall	67 km (42 mi)	Replaced by
Metroad 1	Gore Hill Freeway; Warringah Freeway; Sydney Harbour Tunnel; Cahill Expressway; Eastern Distributor; Southern Cross Drive; General Holmes Drive	Wahroonga	Pymble; Chatswood; Artarmon; North Sydney; Darlinghurst; Zetland; Mascot; Kogarah; Blakehurst; Heathcote	Waterfall	67 km (42 mi)	– re-aligned through central Sydney from Palmer and Bourke Streets (southbound)/Campbell and Crown Streets, Sir John Young Crescent (northbound), Flinders and South Dowling Streets to current alignment when Eastern Distributor opened in 1999 – replaced by
Metroad 1	General Holmes Drive; The Grand Parade; President Avenue; Princes Highway	Wahroonga	Pymble; Chatswood; Artarmon; North Sydney; Darlinghurst; Zetland; Mascot; Kogarah; Blakehurst; Heathcote	Waterfall	67 km (42 mi)	Replaced by
Metroad 2	Windsor Road; Old Windsor Road	Windsor	Vineyard; Rouse Hill; Baulkham Hills; Epping; North Ryde	Lane Cove	46 km (29 mi)	– western end re-aligned from Windsor and Showground Roads, Old Northern and Castle Hill Roads, Pennant Hills and Beecroft Roads, and Epping Road to current alignment when Hills Motorway opened in 1997 – replaced by
Metroad 2	Hills Motorway; Lane Cove Tunnel	Windsor	Vineyard; Rouse Hill; Baulkham Hills; Epping; North Ryde	Lane Cove	46 km (29 mi)	– eastern end along Longueville Road, Gore Hill and Warringah Freeways, Bradfield Highway, Western Distributor, Wattle and Fig Streets (one-way southbound)/Harris and Regent Streets (one-way northbound), Cleveland Street terminating at Ultimo truncated to current alignment when Lane Cove Tunnel opened in 2007: replaced by
Metroad 3	Mona Vale Road; Ryde Road; Lane Cove Road; Devlin Street; Church Street; Concord Road; Homebush Bay Drive; Centenary Drive; Roberts Road; Wiley Avenue; King Georges Road	Mona Vale	Pymble; Ryde; Sydney Olympic Park; Greenacre; Beverly Hills	Blakehurst	51 km (32 mi)	Replaced by
Metroad 4	Western Motorway	Lapstone	Penrith; Prospect; Parramatta; Strathfield	Sydney	58 km (36 mi)	– western end extended along Western Motorway from Emu Plains to Lapstone when extension opened in 1993 – replaced by
Metroad 4	Parramatta Road; Wattle Street; Dobroyd Parade; City West Link; The Crescent; Western Distributor	Lapstone	Penrith; Prospect; Parramatta; Strathfield	Sydney	58 km (36 mi)	– eastern end re-aligned from Parramatta Road, City Road and Cleveland Street terminating at Moore Park to current alignment when City West Link opened in 2000 – replaced by, later by from Strathfield to Haberfield when M4 East Motorway opened in 2019
Metroad 5	South West Motorway; M5 East Motorway	Campbelltown	Prestons; Moorebank; Beverly Hills; Arncliffe	Mascot	44 km (27 mi)	– western end re-aligned from Hume Highway terminating at Casula (replaced by) to South West Motorway terminating at Prestons when Casula bypass opened in 1994 – western end extended along South West Motorway from Prestons to Campbelltown (replacing) when allocated in 1999 – eastern end re-aligned from King Georges Road, Wiley Avenue, Roberts Road, Hume Highway, Parramatta Road and Broadway terminating at Ultimo to current alignment when M5 East Motorway opened in 2001 – replaced by, western end retracted back to Prestons (replaced by)
Metroad 6	Pennant Hills Road; Marsden Road; Stewart Street; Silverwater Road; St Hilliers Road; Rawson Street; Boorea Street; Olympic Drive; Joseph Street; Rookwood Road; Stacey Street; Fairford Road; Davies Road; Alfords Point Road; New Illawarra Road; Heathcote Road	Beecroft	Carlingford; Silverwater; Lidcombe; Bankstown; Menai; Lucas Heights	Heathcote	43 km (27 mi)	– northern end extended along Pennant Hills Road from Carlingford to Beecroft when Westlink M7 opened (replacing) in 2005 – progressively re-aligned from Old Illawarra Road to New Illawarra Road between Menai and Barden Ridge as sections of the Bangor Bypass project completed between 2005 and 2011 – replaced by, northern end retracted back to Carlingford (replaced by)
Metroad 7	Camden Valley Way; Hume Highway; Cumberland Highway	Casula	Liverpool; Smithfield; North Parramatta; Carlingford; Pennant Hills	Wahroonga	41 km (25 mi)	– original alignment through Liverpool from Hume Highway, Macquarie and Terminus Streets, Newbridge and Heathcote Roads terminating at Heathcote changed to South-West Motorway and Heathcote Road, with spur along Hume Highway to Casula added (replacing), when Casula bypass opened in 1994 – allocation removed from South-West Motorway and Heathcote Road (partially replaced by), with spur now assuming current alignment, when allocated in 1999 – majority of allocation abolished by new route along Westlink M7 when opened in 2005; partial allocation along Pennant Hills Road between Beecroft and Wahroonga retained (replacement by proposed) – eventually replaced along entire (former and current) allocation by
Metroad 9	George Street; Macquarie Street; Richmond Road (I); The Northern Road (I); Richmond Road (II); Parker Street; The Northern Road (II); Narellan Road	Windsor	South Windsor; Luddenham; Bringelly; Narellan	Campbelltown	63 km (39 mi)	– replaced by – concurrency with
Metroad 10	Pittwater Road; Condamine Street; Burnt Bridge Creek Deviation; Manly Road; Spit Road; Military Road; Falcon Street	Mona Vale	Narrabeen; Dee Why; The Spit	North Sydney	23 km (14 mi)	– western end along Falcon Street and Pacific Highway terminating at Lane Cove truncated to current alignment when Lane Cove Tunnel opened in 2007 – replaced by
Decommissioned or unsigned route

== State Routes ==
After planning by the Department of Main Roads, the State Route system – a new route numbering system across the state of New South Wales – was introduced in 1974. The route numbering scheme was symbolised by blue rounded shields with white writing – much like the Freeway Routes, except without the red crests – with focus points in Sydney, Newcastle, and Wollongong. They were allocated to fit around the existing National Routes system and Sydney's Freeway Routes, and to also replace Sydney's existing Ring Roads, marking out urban arterial routes and secondary rural highways. The system had two minor updates when Metroads were introduced across Sydney (in 1992–93, and again in 1998–99), and received sporadic updates (mostly route decommissioning) in the years following.

They were allocated as follows:

- 11, 33 and 55: Respectively replaced Ring Roads 1, 3 and 5. In 1988, State Route 77 was commissioned as an additional primary circumferential route;
- 11–77: Greater Sydney. Even numbers were for radial routes in and out of the city, while odd numbers were circumferential around the city, roughly increasing in value anticlockwise around Sydney. Exceptions were State Route 31 (which replaced Metroad 5 when the South Western Motorway was extended east) and State Route 60 (which is in Wollongong). Routes 36, 40, 56, 68 and 69 extended beyond the bounds of Greater Sydney;
- 78–99: Rural New South Wales. Due to a far larger area of coverage and no focal cities, east–west routes were to be even-numbered, while north–south routes were to be odd-numbered;
- 111, 121–124, 128, 131–133, 135: Hunter region. Like Sydney, even numbers were for radial routes into and out of Newcastle, while odd numbers were circumferential around Newcastle;
- 151, 153, 155 and 157: Illawarra region. Like Sydney, even numbers were for radial routes into and out of Wollongong, while odd numbers were circumferential around Wollongong;
- 2: In 2008, Queensland's State Route 2 from the Gold Coast was extended a short distance into far northern NSW and remains the only official state route.

State Routes were eventually replaced by the alphanumeric system in 2013; as many had been decommissioned beforehand, very few survived to be converted into an alphanumeric route number. Those converted in rural areas usually kept their number; some in Greater Sydney were renumbered during the conversion, while most were not replaced at all and became unsigned.

=== Sydney ===
Route	Component roads	From	Via	To	Length	Notes
State Route 11	Bank Street; Pyrmont Bridge Road	Pyrmont	Redfern; Darlinghurst	Rushcutters Bay	6.8 km (4.2 mi)	Decommissioned in 1993, not replaced
State Route 11	Wattle/Abercrombie Streets (n/bound); Watte/Fig/Harris/Regent Streets (s/bound)	Pyrmont	Redfern; Darlinghurst	Rushcutters Bay	6.8 km (4.2 mi)	– re-aligned through central Sydney from Wattle and Abercrombie Streets to current alignment when the Fig Street Connection opened in 1990 – replaced by in 1993, later removed when Lane Cove Tunnel opened in 2007
State Route 11	Cleveland Street	Pyrmont	Redfern; Darlinghurst	Rushcutters Bay	6.8 km (4.2 mi)	Replaced by in 1992, later removed when City West Link opened in 2000
State Route 11	South Dowling Street	Pyrmont	Redfern; Darlinghurst	Rushcutters Bay	6.8 km (4.2 mi)	Replaced by in 1993, later removed when Eastern Distributor opened in 1999
State Route 11	Barcom Avenue; Boundary Street; McLachlan Avenue (n/bound); Neild Avenue (s/bound)	Pyrmont	Redfern; Darlinghurst	Rushcutters Bay	6.8 km (4.2 mi)	– re-aligned through Darlinghurst from Boundary Street and Neild Avenue to current alignment in the late 1980s – decommissioned in 1993, not replaced
State Route 12	Pittwater Road; Belgrave Street; Sydney Road	Brookvale	Manly	Seaforth	7.3 km (4.5 mi)	– southern end extended along Sydney Road through Balgowlah to Seaforth when Burnt Bridge Creek Deviation opened (replacing) in 1985: northern end re-aligned from Howard Avenue/The Strand/Griffin Road/Adams and Oliver Streets terminating in Dee Why to current alignment in 1993; – decommissioned in 1995
State Route 14	Barrenjoey Road	Palm Beach	Mona Vale; Narrabeen; Dee Why; The Spit; Neutral Bay	Artarmon	43 km (27 mi)	Decommissioned in 1998, not replaced
State Route 14	Pittwater Road; Condamine Street; Burnt Bridge Creek Deviation; Manly Road; Spit Road; Military Road; Falcon Street; Pacific Highway	Palm Beach	Mona Vale; Narrabeen; Dee Why; The Spit; Neutral Bay	Artarmon	43 km (27 mi)	– re-aligned through Balgowlah from Sydney Road and Condamine Street to current alignment when Burnt Bridge Creek Deviation opened (replaced by) in 1985 – southern end extended along Falcon Street and Pacific Highway from Neutral Bay to current alignment when Gore Hill Freeway opened in 1992 – replaced by in 1998, later by in 2013
State Route 17	Canal Road; Ricketty Street; Kent Road; Gardeners Road	St Peters	Rosebery	Kingsford	5.4 km (3.4 mi)	Decommissioned in 1998
State Route 21	Great North Road; Lyons Road; Bayswater Street (n/bound); Marlborough Street (s/bound); Westbourne Street; Victoria Road; Burns Bay Road; Centennial Avenue	Five Dock	Drummoyne; Lane Cove West	Castlecrag	14.8 km (9.2 mi)	– northern end terminating in Castlecrag truncated to Lane Cove West in 1995 – decommissioned in 2004
State Route 21	Mowbray Road; Alpha Road; Edinburgh Road	Five Dock	Drummoyne; Lane Cove West	Castlecrag	14.8 km (9.2 mi)	Decommissioned in 1995
State Route 22	Sydney Road; Frenchs Forest Road; Clontarf Street; Wakehurst Parkway	Seaforth	Frenchs Forest	North Narrabeen	15.8 km (9.8 mi)	Decommissioned in 2004
State Route 26	Eastern Valley Way; Sailors Bay Road; Strathallen Avenue; Miller Street	Roseville	Castlecrag	North Sydney	6.5 km (4.0 mi)	Decommissioned in 2004
State Route 27	Concord Road; Leicester Avenue; Raw Square; Redmyre Road; The Boulevard; Coronation Parade; Punchbowl Road	Concord West	Strathfield; Croydon Park	Wiley Park	10.5 km (6.5 mi)	– allocated when Strathfield bypass opened (replacing) in 1992: decommissioned in 2004
State Route 28	Carlingford Road	Carlingford	Epping; North Ryde; Artarmon	Sydney	21.9 km (14 mi)	Decommissioned in 1993, not replaced
State Route 28	Beecroft Road; Epping Road; Longueville Road	Carlingford	Epping; North Ryde; Artarmon	Sydney	21.9 km (14 mi)	Replaced by in 1993, later removed when Hills Motorway opened in 1997
State Route 28	Gore Hill Freeway; Warringah Freeway; Bradfield Highway	Carlingford	Epping; North Ryde; Artarmon	Sydney	21.9 km (14 mi)	– eastern end extended along Gore Hill and Warringah Freeways and Bradfield Highway from Artarmon to Sydney CBD when Gore Hill Freeway opened in 1992 – replaced by in 1993, later removed when Lane Cove Tunnel opened in 2007
State Route 29	Delhi Road; Millwood Avenue; Fullers Road; Pacific Highway; Boundary Street; Babbage Road; Warringah Road	North Ryde	Chatswood; Forestville	Dee Why	17.8 km (11 mi)	Replaced by in 2013
State Route 30	Showground Road; Old Northern Road; Castle Hill Road; Pennant Hills Road; Beecroft Road	Castle Hill	Pennant Hills; Epping	Ryde	20.5 km (13 mi)	Replaced by in 1993, later removed when Hills Motorway opened in 1997
State Route 30	Blaxland Road; Devlin Street	Castle Hill	Pennant Hills; Epping	Ryde	20.5 km (13 mi)	Decommissioned in 1993, not replaced
State Route 31	Hume Highway; Parramatta Road	Liverpool	Yagoona; Enfield; Haberfield	Ultimo	31 km (19 mi)	– allocated along Hume Highway from Warwick Farm to Chullora when Casula bypass opened (replacing) in 1994 – eastern end extended along Hume Highway and Parramatta Road from Chullora to Ultimo when M5 East Motorway opened in 2001 – replaced by in 2013
State Route 33	Mona Vale Road; Ryde Road; Lane Cove Road; Devlin Street; Church Street; Concord Road; Homebush Bay Drive; Centenary Drive; Roberts Road; Wiley Avenue; King Georges Road	Mona Vale	Pymble; Ryde; Sydney Olympic Park; Greenacre; Beverly Hills	Blakehurst	51 km (32 mi)	– re-aligned through Strathfield from Concord Road, Leicester Avenue, Raw Square, Redmyre Road, The Boulevard, Coronation Parade and Punchbowl Road to current alignment when Strathfield bypass opened (replaced by) in 1992 – replaced by in 1993, later by in 2013
State Route 36	Old Northern Road; Wisemans Ferry Road; Peats Ridge Road	Baulkham Hills	Castle Hill; Dural; Wisemans Ferry	Somersby	118 km (73 mi)	– northern end re-aligned from George Downes Drive and Peats Ridge Road terminating in Calga to current alignment when the Calga–Somersby section of the F3 opened in 1986 – decommissioned in 2004
State Route 40	Main Street; Lithgow Street; Mort Street; Eddy Street; Chifley Road; Bells Line of Road; Kurrajong Road; March Street; East Market Street; Windsor Street; Windsor Road, Richmond; Richmond Road	Lithgow	Bilpin; Richmond; Windsor; Rouse Hill; Baulkham Hills; North Parramatta; Rydalmere; Ryde; Drummoyne; Rozelle	Sydney	142 km (88 mi)	Replaced by in 2013; Windsor and Richmond Roads renamed Hawkesbury Valley Way
State Route 40	Macquarie Street; Windsor Road	Lithgow	Bilpin; Richmond; Windsor; Rouse Hill; Baulkham Hills; North Parramatta; Rydalmere; Ryde; Drummoyne; Rozelle	Sydney	142 km (88 mi)	Decommissioned in 2013, not replaced
State Route 40	Old Windsor Road; Briens Road; James Ruse Drive	Lithgow	Bilpin; Richmond; Windsor; Rouse Hill; Baulkham Hills; North Parramatta; Rydalmere; Ryde; Drummoyne; Rozelle	Sydney	142 km (88 mi)	– re-aligned between Kellyville and Parramatta from Windsor Road, Church Street and Victoria Road to current alignment in 2007 – replaced by from Seven Hills to Parramatta in 2013, allocation removed and not replaced otherwise
State Route 40	Victoria Road	Lithgow	Bilpin; Richmond; Windsor; Rouse Hill; Baulkham Hills; North Parramatta; Rydalmere; Ryde; Drummoyne; Rozelle	Sydney	142 km (88 mi)	Replaced by in 2013
State Route 40	Western Distributor	Lithgow	Bilpin; Richmond; Windsor; Rouse Hill; Baulkham Hills; North Parramatta; Rydalmere; Ryde; Drummoyne; Rozelle	Sydney	142 km (88 mi)	Decommissioned in 2013, not replaced
State Route 42	Richmond Road; Patrick Street; Newton Road; Main Street; Blacktown Road; Prospect Highway	Oakhurst	Blacktown	Prospect	11.9 km (7.4 mi)	Allocated in 1985 but never properly signed, replaced by in 1992
State Route 44	Russell Street; Great Western Highway (I); Jane Street; Belmore Street; North Street; Henry Street; Great Western Highway (II); Church Street; Parramatta Road	Lapstone	Penrith; St Marys; Parramatta; Auburn	Strathfield	43 km (27 mi)	– allocated along Great Western Highway from Emu Plains to Prospect when Eastern Creek to Prospect section of Western Freeway opened (replacing) in 1974 – eastern end extended from Prospect to Strathfield when Auburn to Strathfield section of Western Freeway opened in 1982 – re-aligned through Penrith from High Street to current alignment in 1993 – western end extended along Russell Street from Emu Plains to Lapstone when Western Freeway extension opened in 1993 – replaced by in 2013
State Route 45	Marsden Road; Stewart Street; Silverwater Road; St Hilliers Road; Rawson Street; Boorea Street; Olympic Drive; Joseph Street; Rookwood Road; Stacey Street; Fairford Road; Davies Road; Alfords Point Road; Old Illawarra Road; New Illawarra Road	Carlingford	Silverwater; Lidcombe; Bankstown; Menai; Lucas Heights	Heathcote	41 km (25 mi)	– re-aligned through Lidcombe from Olympic Drive, Bridge Street and Joseph Street to current alignment when Lidcombe bypass opened in 1982 – re-aligned through southern Bankstown from Stacey Street and Canterbury and Fairford Roads to current alignment when Fairford Road extension opened in 1985 – re-aligned through Illawong and Menai from Old Illawarra Road to current alignment when Alfords Point deviation opened in 1992 – northern end extended along Stewart Street and Marsden Road from Ermington to Carlingford when Silverwater Road extension opened in 1996 – re-aligned through northern Bankstown from Rookwood Road, Hume Highway and Stacey Street to current alignment when Stacey Street extension opened in 1999 – replaced by in 1999, later by in 2013
State Route 45	Heathcote Road	Carlingford	Silverwater; Lidcombe; Bankstown; Menai; Lucas Heights	Heathcote	41 km (25 mi)	Replaced by in 1993, later by in 1999, and in 2013
State Route 50	Park Road; The Northern Road; Elizabeth Drive; Cabramatta Road	Wallacia	Luddenham; Badgerys Creek; Bonnyrigg	Cabramatta	31 km (19 mi)	Decommissioned in 1998
State Route 53	Briens Road; James Ruse Drive	Constitution Hill	Parramatta	Clyde	8 km (5.0 mi)	– allocated along James Ruse Drive from Clyde to North Parramatta when Parramatta to North Parramatta section of James Ruse Drive opened in 1977 – western end extended from North Parramatta to Northmead when North Parramatta to Northmead section of James Ruse Drive opened in 1979 – western end extended from Northmead to Constitution Hill when Northmead to Constitution Hill section of James Ruse Drive opened in 1981 – replaced by (from onstitution Hill to North Parramatta) and (from North Parramatta to Clyde) in 1988
State Route 54	Macquarie Street; Terminus Street; Newbridge Road; Milperra Road; (New) Canterbury Road; Stanmore Road; Enmore Road	Liverpool	Milperra; Petersham; Newtown	Ultimo	28.4 km (18 mi)	Replaced by in 2013
State Route 54	King Street; City Road	Liverpool	Milperra; Petersham; Newtown	Ultimo	28.4 km (18 mi)	– eastern end extended from Newtown to Ultimo along current alignment (replacing) in 1993 – replaced by in 2013
State Route 55	James Ruse Drive; Parramatta Road	Parramatta	Villawood; Milperra; East Hills; Hurstville	Arncliffe	42 km (26 mi)	– northern end re-aligned from Pennant Hills Road (replaced by) and Church Street terminating in Wahroonga to current alignment (replacing along James Ruse Drive) in 1988 – decommissioned in 2004
State Route 55	Woodville Road; Henry Lawson Drive; Forest Road (I); Queens Road; Croydon Road; Forest Rd (II)	Parramatta	Villawood; Milperra; East Hills; Hurstville	Arncliffe	42 km (26 mi)	– re-aligned through Hurstville from Forest Road to current alignment in 1993 – decommissioned in 2004
State Route 56	Campbelltown Road; Moore Street; Oxley Street; Narellan Road; Gilchrist Drive; Kellicar Road; Geary Street; Menangle Road; Picton Road; Menangle Street	Glenfield	Bardia; Campbelltown; Menangle	Picton	46 km (29 mi)	– re-aligned through Leumeah from Hollylea Road to current alignment in 1979 – re-aligned through eastern Campbelltown from Queen Street to current alignment in 1980 – re-aligned through western Campbelltown from Camden and Menangle Roads to current alignment in 1997 – decommissioned in 2013
State Route 61	East Market Street; Lennox Street; Blacktown Road; Richmond Road; Rooty Hill Road North; Woodstock Avenue; Philip Parkway; Eastern Road; Rooty Hill Road South; Wallgrove Road; Elizabeth Drive	Richmond	Marsden Park; Rooty Hill; Horsley Park; Bonnyrigg	Liverpool	45 km (28 mi)	– re-aligned through Rooty Hill from Rooty Hill Road to Woodstock Avenue, Duke and Railway Streets, Frances Road eliminating level crossing in 1980 – re-aligned through Rooty Hill from Woodstock Avenue, Duke and Railway Streets, Frances Road to current alignment when Philip Parkway opened in 1992 – decommissioned when Westlink M7 opened in 2005
State Route 61	Hume Highway; South Western Freeway; Heathcote Road	Richmond	Marsden Park; Rooty Hill; Horsley Park; Bonnyrigg	Liverpool	45 km (28 mi)	– re-aligned through Liverpool from Macquarie and Scott Streets to Bigge Street (northbound)/George Street (southbound) in the early 1980s – re-aligned through Liverpool from Bigge/George Streets and Newbridge Road to current alignment when Moorebank section of South-Western Freeway opened in 1985 – replaced by in 1993, later removed (with Heathcote Road partially allocated) in 1999
State Route 63	Erskine Park Road; Roper Road; Carlisle Avenue; Woodstock Avenue; Rooty Hill Road North; Richmond Road; Patrick Street; Newton Road; Main Street; Blacktown Road; Prospect Highway	Erskine Park	Mount Druitt; Oakhurst	Prospect	26.3 km (16.3 mi)	Allocated in 1992 (replacing), decommissioned in 1998
State Route 64	Flinders Street; South Dowling Street; Southern Cross Drive; General Holmes Drive; The Grand Parade	Darlinghurst	Mascot; Brighton-Le-Sands; Sans Souci; Caringbah	Kirrawee	26.9 km (16.7 mi)	– re-aligned through Mascot from Wentworth Avenue, Botany and Mill Pond Roads to current alignment when Southern Cross Drive southern extension opened in 1988 – replaced by from Darlinghurst to Brighton-Le-Sands when Sydney Harbour Tunnel opened in 1992; later by in 1993, and in 2013
State Route 64	The Grand Parade; Sandringham Street; Rocky Point Road; Taren Point Road; Kingsway	Darlinghurst	Mascot; Brighton-Le-Sands; Sans Souci; Caringbah	Kirrawee	26.9 km (16.7 mi)	Decommissioned in 2004
State Route 65	Pitt Town Road; Bathurst Street; Chatham Street; Eldon Street; Cattai Road; Wisemans Ferry Road	McGraths Hill	Pitt Town; Cattai	Maroota	28.8 km (17.9 mi)	Decommissioned in 1998
State Route 66	Regent Street (s/bound); Henderson Road/Wyndham/Gibbons Streets (n/bound); Botany Road; McEvoy Street; Euston Road; Sydney Park Road; Princes Highway	Ultimo	St Peters; Arncliffe	Kogarah	12.4 km (7.7 mi)	– allocated (replacing) when Sydney Harbour Tunnel opened in 1992 – northern end re-aligned from Princes Highway, King Street and City Road (replaced by) to current alignment in 1993 – decommissioned in 2004
State Route 67	Mamre Road	St Marys	Erskine Park	Kemps Creek	13.4 km (8.3 mi)	Allocated in 1992, decommissioned in 1998
State Route 68	Farnell Avenue; Audley Road; Sir Betram Stevens Drive; Lady Wakehurst Drive; Lawrence Hargarve Drive	Loftus	Lilyvale; Otford	Bulli	40 km (25 mi)	Royal National Park route, decommissioned in 2004
State Route 69	Putty Road; Wilberforce Road	Singleton	Windsor; South Windsor; Luddenham; Bringelly; Narellan; Campbelltown; Appin	Thirroul	272 km (169 mi)	Decommissioned in 2013
State Route 69	George Street; Macquarie Street; Richmond Road; The Northern Road (I); Richmond Road, Penrith; Parker Street; The Northern Road (II); Narellan Road	Singleton	Windsor; South Windsor; Luddenham; Bringelly; Narellan; Campbelltown; Appin	Thirroul	272 km (169 mi)	Replaced by in 1998, later by in 2013
State Route 69	Appin Road	Singleton	Windsor; South Windsor; Luddenham; Bringelly; Narellan; Campbelltown; Appin	Thirroul	272 km (169 mi)	Replaced by in 2013
State Route 70	Anzac Parade; Bunnerong Road	Moore Park	Kingsford; Matraville	La Perouse	13.3 km (8.3 mi)	– southern end truncated from La Perouse to Matraville in 1994 – decommissioned in 2004
State Route 73	Bosworth Street; Castlereagh Road; Mulgoa Road	Richmond	Castlereagh; Penrith; Mulgoa	Wallacia	38 km (24 mi)	Decommissioned in 1998
State Route 76	William Street; Kings Cross Tunnel; Bayswater Road (e/bound); Craigend Street (w/bound); New South Head Road	Woolloomooloo	Double Bay	Vaucluse	8 km (5.0 mi)	– allocated when Kings Cross Tunnel opened in 1976 – eastern end re-aligned from Hopetoun Avenue terminating in Watsons Bay to current alignment in 1994 – decommissioned in 2004
State Route 77	Cumberland Highway	Liverpool	Smithfield; North Parramatta; Carlingford; Pennant Hills	Wahroonga	35 km (22 mi)	– allocated when Cumberland Highway declared (replacing from Constitution Hill to North Parramatta, and from North Parramatta to Wahroonga) in 1988 – replaced by in 1993, later removed (from Liverpool to Carlingford) when Westlink M7 opened in 2005; eventually replaced by in 2013
Decommissioned or unsigned route

=== Rural New South Wales ===
Route	Component roads	From	Via	To	Length	Notes
State Route 2	Gold Coast Highway	NSW/Qld border		Tweed Heads	2.5 km (1.6 mi)	– allocated when Tugun Bypass opened in 2008 as an extension of the Queensland route into NSW (replacing), currently the only active state route in New South Wales – continues north as along Gold Coast Highway into Queensland to Pacific Pines
State Route 78	Waterfall Way	Armidale	Ebor; Dorrigo; Bellingen	Raleigh	170 km (106 mi)	Replaced by in 2013
State Route 79	Old Hume Highway; Bowral Road; Mittagong Road; Bong Bong Street; Station Street; Funston Street; Kangaloon Road; Sheepwash Road; Nowra Road; Moss Vale Road	Aylmerton	Mittagong; Bowral; Fitzroy Falls	Bomaderry	68 km (42 mi)	– northern end extended along Old Hume Highway from Mittagong to Aylmerton in 1996 – replaced by in 2013
State Route 80	Centennial Road; Kirkham Road	Berrima	Bowral; Robertson; Jamberoo	Kiama	68 km (42 mi)	Decommissioned in 1989
State Route 80	Kangaloon Road; Sheepwash Road; Illawarra Highway; Jamberoo Mountain Road; Jamberoo Road; Terralong Street	Berrima	Bowral; Robertson; Jamberoo	Kiama	68 km (42 mi)	– western end truncated to Bowral when Berrima bypass opened in 1989 – decommissioned in 2013
State Route 81	Edward Street; Wellington Street; Peabody Road; The Escort Way; Brown Street; Canowindra Road; Redfern Street; Lachlan Street; Grenfell Road; Lachlan Valley Way	Molong	Cudal; Canowindra; Cowra; Boorowa	Bowning	215 km (134 mi)	Replaced by in 2013
State Route 82	Wine Country Drive; Allandale Road; Vincent Street; Aberdare Road; Greta Street; Caledonia Street; Allandale Street; Lake Road; Leggetts Drive; Freemans Drive	Branxton	Cessnock; Kearsley	Cooranbong	50 km (31 mi)	Replaced by in 2013
State Route 83	Pacific Highway (I); Old Pacific Highway; Wisemans Ferry Road; Central Coast Highway; Riou Street; Showground Road; Pacific Highway (II)	Wahroonga	Hornsby; Berowra; Mooney Mooney; Gosford	Doyalson	98 km (61 mi)	– allocated along Pacific Highway between Berowra and Ourimbah (which Sydney–Newcastle Freeway had previously bypassed) in 1979 – northern end extended to Doyalson when Kangy Angy–Wallarah section of Sydney–Newcastle Freeway opened (replacing) in 1983 – southern end extended to Wahroonga when Berowra–Wahroonga section of Sydney–Newcastle Freeway opened (replacing, and through Hornsby) in 1989 – replaced by (Wahroonga to Kariong) and (Kariong to Gosford) in 2013, unallocated otherwise
State Route 84	Golden Highway	Dubbo	Merriwa; Denman	Whittingham	313 km (194 mi)	– eastern end re-aligned from Denman Road terminating in Muswellbrook to current alignment in 1997 – replaced by in 2013
State Route 85	Goldfields Way	Wyalong	Temora	Old Junee	116 km (72 mi)	Replaced by in 2013
State Route 86	Castlereagh Highway	Gilgandra	Dunedoo; Mudgee	Marrangaroo	281 km (175 mi)	Replaced by in 2013
State Route 86	Honour Avenue; Federation Way	Corowa		NSW/Vic border	3 km (1.9 mi)	Wasn't on RTA's database when RTA was in force. Route still active (and signposted) however no longer official.
State Route 87	Kidman Way	Bourke	Cobar; Mount Hope; Hillston; Goolgowi; Griffith; Darlington Point	Bundure	643 km (400 mi)	– northern end extended from Hillston to Bourke when road sealing completed in 2001 – replaced by in 2013
State Route 88	Picton Road	Picton	Wilton	Fairy Meadow	44 km (27 mi)	– re-aligned through Maldon and Wilton from Maldon Bridge/Wilton Park/Berwick Park/Condell Park Roads and Hornby Street to current alignment in 1980 – re-aligned through Wilton from Almond Street, Wilton Road and MacArthur Drive to current alignment when Wilton bypass opened in 1993 – replaced by (from Wilton to Cataract) in 2013, allocation removed and not replaced otherwise
State Route 89	Camden Valley Way; Camden Bypass; Old Hume Highway (I); Remembrance Driveway (I); Argyle Street; Old Hume Highway (II); Remembrance Driveway (II)	Prestons	Camden; Picton	Alpine	83 km (52 mi)	– allocated along former Hume Highway alignment when Campbelltown to Yanderra section of South Western Freeway opened (replacing) in 1980 – uncertainty on which sections called "Old Hume Highway" and "Remembrance Driveway" – replaced by
State Route 90	Bathurst Street; Denison Street; Parkes Road; Henry Parkes Way (I); Dalton Street; Clarinda Street; Henry Parkes Way (II); The Escort Way; Forbes Road	Condobolin	Parkes	Orange	198 km (123 mi)	Decommissioned in 2013
State Route 91	Summerland Way	NSW/Qld border	Kyogle; Casino	South Grafton	199 km (124 mi)	Replaced by in 2013
State Route 94	Irrigation Way; Burley Griffin Way	Griffith	Ardlethan; Temora; Binalong	Bowning	279 km (173 mi)	Replaced by in 2013
State Route 95	Warialda Road	Yetman	Warialda; Bingara; Manilla	Tamworth	274 km (170 mi)	Decommissioned in 2013
State Route 95	Fossickers Way	Yetman	Warialda; Bingara; Manilla	Tamworth	274 km (170 mi)	Replaced by in 2013
Decommissioned or unsigned route

=== Hunter region ===
Route	Component roads	From	Via	To	Length	Notes
State Route 111	Motorway Link Road; Pacific Highway	Wallarah	Charlestown; Newcastle	Hexham	74 km (46 mi)	– allocated when Mandalong–Freemans Waterhole section of Sydney–Newcastle Freeway opened (replacing) in 1988 – replaced by in 2013
State Route 121	Northcott Drive; Bridges Road; Turton Road; Station Street; Platt Street; Railway Street; Hanbury Street; Vine Street; Industrial Drive; Tourle Street; Cormorant Road; Teal Street; Nelson Bay Road	Adamstown Heights	Mayfield; Kooragang; Williamtown	Ferodale	44 km (27 mi)	– northern end truncated to Williamtown in 1994 – replaced by in 2013
State Route 121	Medowie Road	Adamstown Heights	Mayfield; Kooragang; Williamtown	Ferodale	44 km (27 mi)	Decommissioned in 1994
State Route 122	Tomago Road; Cabbage Tree Road	Hexham	Williamtown; Nelson Bay	Shoal Bay	51 km (32 mi)	Decommissioned in 2013
State Route 122	Nelson Bay Road; Stockton Street	Hexham	Williamtown; Nelson Bay	Shoal Bay	51 km (32 mi)	– eastern end truncated to Nelson Bay in 1994 – replaced by in 2013
State Route 122	Church Street; Government Road; Victoria Parade; Shoal Bay Road	Hexham	Williamtown; Nelson Bay	Shoal Bay	51 km (32 mi)	Decommissioned in 1994
State Route 123	Wallsend Road; Sandgate Road; Newcastle Inner City Bypass (I)	Sandgate	Jesmond; Lambton	Bennetts Green	16.4 km (10 mi)	– re-aligned through Jesmond from Sandgate Road, Vale/Moore Streets and Blue Gum Road to current alignment when first northern section of Newcastle Inner City Bypass opened in 1993 – replaced by in 2013
State Route 123	Newcastle Road; Croudace Street; Lookout Road; Charlestown Road	Sandgate	Jesmond; Lambton	Bennetts Green	16.4 km (10 mi)	Replaced by in 2013
State Route 123	Newcastle Inner City Bypass (II)	Sandgate	Jesmond; Lambton	Bennetts Green	16.4 km (10 mi)	– re-aligned from Charlestown Road terminating at Charlestown to current alignment when southern section of Newcastle Inner City Bypass opened in 2003 – replaced by in 2013
State Route 124	Industrial Drive; Hannell Street; Stewart Avenue	Mayfield West		Newcastle West	7.4 km (4.6 mi)	– southern end re-aligned from Hannell/Hunter Streets to current alignment when Stewart Street extension opened in 2000 – replaced by in 2013
State Route 128	George Booth Drive; Main Road; Cardiff Road; Lookout Road; Russell Road; Rugby Road; Alma Road; Lambton Road; Belford Street; Tudor Street	Buchanan	West Wallsend; Cardiff	Newcastle West	32 km (20 mi)	Replaced by (from West Wallsend to Cardiff) in 2013, allocation removed and not replaced otherwise
State Route 131	Sandgate Road; Tillie Street; Cameron Street; Longworth Avenue; Thomas Street; Lake Road; Main Road	Shortland	Wallsend; Glendale; Speers Point; Warners Bay	Belmont	24.3 km (15.1 mi)	Replaced by when Five Islands Deviation extension opened in 1977
State Route 131	The Esplanade; Bareki Road; Macquarie Drive; Croudace Bay Road; Lewers Street; Ross Street; Brooks Parade; Macquarie Street	Shortland	Wallsend; Glendale; Speers Point; Warners Bay	Belmont	24.3 km (15.1 mi)	– northern end terminating in Shortland truncated to Speers Point (replaced by) in 1977 – replaced by (from Speers Point to Warners Bay) and (from Warners Bay to Belmont)
State Route 132	Maitland Road; Cessnock Road; Station Street; First Street; Northcote Street; Mitchell Avenue; Victoria Street; Tarro Street; Mulbring Street; John Renshaw Drive	Cessnock	Kurri Kurri; Buchanan	Beresfield	30 km (19 mi)	Replaced by in 2013
State Route 133	Mandalong Road; Dora Street; Macquarie Street; Wangi Road; Mt Waring Road; Excelsior Parade; Cary Street; Anzac Parade; Main Road; Toronto Road; Five Islands Road; T.C Frith Avenue; Lake Road; Thomas Street; Longworth Avenue; Cameron Street; Tillie Street; Sandgate Road	Morisset	Toronto; Speers Point; Glendale; Wallsend	Shortland	40 km (25 mi)	– northern end extended from Speers Point to Shortland along current alignment (replacing) when Five Islands Deviation extension opened in 1977 – southern end extended through Morisset to Sydney–Newcastle Freeway after Wallarah Creek to Mandalong Road section opened, in 1988 – re-aligned through Wallsend from Lake Road and Cowper Street to current alignment when Wallsend bypass opened in 1993 – replaced by from Morisset to Wallsend in 2013, allocation removed and not replaced otherwise
State Route 135	Cessnock Road; Main Road; Lang Street; Victoria Street; Railway Street; Stanford Street; Leggetts Drive	Maitland	Kurri Kurri	Mulbring	20 km (12 mi)	– southern end re-aligned through Mulbring from Whitebridge and Maitland Roads, Child and Palmer Streets to current alignment when road upgrades completed in 1988 – northern end re-aligned through Maitland from Regent Street (and now Mount Dee Road) to current alignment when Maitland bypass opened in 1988 – decommissioned in 2013
Decommissioned or unsigned route

=== Illawarra region ===
Route	Component roads	From	Via	To	Length	Notes
State Route 60	Princes Highway (I); Northern Distributor; Princes Highway (II)	Waterfall	Bulli; Wollongong; Unanderra	Dapto	57 km (35 mi)	– allocated along Princes Highway through Wollongong (replacing) in 1989 – re-aligned from Princes Highway to Northern Distributor and Bellambi Lane when the second carriageway of Towradgi to Bellambi section opened in 1993 – decommissioned in 2004, eventually replaced by (from Thirroul to North Wollongong in 2009); Northern Distributor renamed Memorial Drive in 2010
State Route 151	Bourke Street; Kembla Street; Corrimal Street; Springhill Road; Five Islands Road; King Street; Primbee Deviation; Windang Road; Shellharbour Road	North Wollongong	Wollongong; Warrawong; Shellharbour	Flinders	24.3 km (15.1 mi)	Replaced by in 2013
State Route 153	The Avenue; Masters Road	Figtree		Spring Hill	2.1 km (1 mi)	Decommissioned in 2013
State Route 155	Five Islands Road; Flinders Street; Old Port Road; Military Road; Church Street; Illawarra Street; Northcliffe Drive	Unanderra	Port Kembla	Kembla Grange	16.4 km (10.2 mi)	Decommissioned in 2013
State Route 157	Tongarra Road; Princes Highway; (New) Lake Entrance Road	Albion Park		Warilla	9.1 km (5.7 mi)	Decommissioned in 2013
State Route 266	Terry Street	Albion Park			TBC	Not fully signed (wasn't on RTA's database when RTA was in force), decommissioned in 2013
Decommissioned or unsigned route

== Freeway Routes ==
A new system, specifically designed for freeways in New South Wales, was introduced in 1973. They were symbolised by blue rounded shields with white writing crowned by red crests, in an imitation of the American Interstate shield. Planning, and resulting land reservation, for these freeways had already been made by the Department of Main Roads in 1951 (with the exception of the F2, which was planned later in 1967), and signage on existing roads in these reservations was rolled out between 1973 and 1974; while extensions or freeway segments were signed as they opened throughout the 1970s, signage became neglected during the 1980s and subsequent extensions to existing signed Freeways Routes were rarely marked (particularly since plans and construction of many of the proposed freeways were cancelled by the state government in 1977). Eight routes were planned, but only five were ever signed. The system was never officially decommissioned, but virtually all signage was removed when Metroads were introduced in 1992.

Route	Component roads	From	Via	To	Length	Notes
F1	Wakehurst Parkway; Warringah Freeway	Frenchs Forest	Seaforth; Castelcrag; Willoughby; Naremburn	North Sydney	approx 15 km (9.3 mi)	Fully signed across Warringah Freeway (North Sydney to Naremburn, constructed in stages between 1968 and 1978) in 1974. Extension from Naremburn to Frenchs Forest (including conversion of Wakehurst Parkway to freeway standards) never built, and cancelled in 1977.
F2	Castlereagh Freeway	Castlereagh	Llandilo; Quakers Hill; Seven Hills; Beecroft	North Ryde	approx 50 km (31 mi)	Never signed. Castlereagh Freeway proposed between Castlereagh and Macquarie Park, to connect with proposed Lane Cove Valley (LCV) Expressway (F3), and was extended further east to meet Epping Road in North Ryde when LCV Expressway cancelled in 1977. Westlink M7 (from Oakhurst, opened in 2005) and Hills Motorway (opened in 1997) built in Castlereagh Freeway reservation after Freeway Routes were phased out.
F3	Sydney–Newcastle Freeway; Lane Cove Valley Expressway; North Western Expressway	Beresfield	Mooney Mooney; Wahroonga; North Ryde; Linley Point; Drummoyne; Pyrmont	Sydney CBD	approx 150 km (93 mi)	Never signed. First part of North Western Expressway from Drummoyne to Linley Point (including Gladesville, Tarban Creek and Fig Tree Bridges, now Victoria Road) built between 1959 and 1965; second part from Sydney CBD to Pyrmont (now Western Distributor) built between 1971 and 1976; remaining part between Pyrmont and Drummoyne cancelled in 1977. Part of Hills Motorway (opened in 1997) built in Lane Cove Valley Expressway reservation (from North Ryde to Macquarie Park). Sydney-Newcastle Freeway built in segments between 1964 and 1998, portions were actually a tollway for a time, and Freeway Routes phased out when fully built. Still commonly referred to as F3 on government documents and colloquially.
F4	Western Freeway	Penrith	Prospect; Parramatta	Strathfield	44 km (27 mi)	Fully signed across western section of freeway (Emu Plains to Prospect) in 1974, but not signed after eastern section of freeway (Auburn to Strathfield) opened (in stages between 1982 and 1985).
F5	South Western Freeway	Crossroads	Raby	Campbelltown	15 km (9.3 mi)	Fully signed between Crossroads and Raby when South Western Freeway opened in 1973, extended to Campbelltown when section opened in 1974. Sections north of Crossroads within reservation bypassing Liverpool were constructed after Freeway Routes were phased out. Still commonly referred to as F5 on government documents and colloquially.
F6	Southern Freeway	Ultimo	Redfern; Ramsgate; Kirrawee; Loftus; Waterfall; Wollongong; Unanderra	Yallah	approx 95 km (59 mi)	Fully signed between Gwynneville and Unanderra in 1973, extended north when Waterfall to Bulli Tops section opened in 1975, extended south to Kanahooka when section opened in 1978. Captain Cook Bridge, crossing the Georges River in southern Sydney, was built in Southern Freeway reservation in 1965, but project was cancelled north of Waterfall in 1977. Scattered signage still remains today; still commonly referred to as F6 on government documents and colloquially.
F7	Cahill Expressway; Eastern Distributor; Eastern Freeway	Sydney CBD	Darlinghurst	Bondi Junction	approx 8 km (5.0 mi)	Never signed. Cahill Expressway opened in stages between 1958 and 1962 but not signed; Eastern Distributor opened in 1999 after Freeway Routes were phased out. Eastern Freeway was not built, but the Bondi Junction bypass was built in its reservation in 1979 (renamed Syd Einfeld Drive in 1988).
F8	Northern Distributor	Bulli	Wollongong	Gwynneville	9.4 km (5.8 mi)	Fully signed between Gwynneville and North Wollongong in 1973, but not signed when next extension north to Towradgi opened in 1990. Extended north within reservation from Towradgi to Bellambi in 1992, and from Bellambi to Bulli in 2009; renamed Memorial Drive in 2010.
Decommissioned or unsigned route

== Ring Roads ==
The Ring Roads system was introduced in 1964 as a way to highlight major routes around Sydney (on circumferential routes), complimenting the existing National Route system (which were all radial routes into and out of Sydney). Ring Roads carried a blue and white circular shield with a dotted outline. Three Ring Roads were proclaimed, but this system lasted for only 10 years before being replaced by the State Routes system in 1974.

Route	Component roads	From	Via	To	Length	Notes
Ring Road 1	Wattle Street; Abercrombie Street; Cleveland Street; South Dowling Street; Barcom Avenue; Boundary Street; Neild Avenue	Pyrmont	Redfern; Darlinghurst	Rushcutters Bay	5.9 km (3.7 mi)	Replaced by in 1974
Ring Road 3	Mona Vale Road; Ryde Road; Lane Cove Road; Devlin Street; Church Street; Concord Road; Leicester Avenue; Raw Square; Redmyre Road; The Boulevard; Coronation Parade; Punchbowl Road; King Georges Road	Mona Vale	Pymble; Ryde; Strathfield; Belfield; Beverly Hills	Blakehurst	51 km (32 mi)	– re-aligned through Strathfield from Albert Road, Strathfield Square and The Boulevard to current alignment when Raw Square extension opened in 1972 – replaced by in 1974
Ring Road 5	Pennant Hills Road; Church Street; Woodville Road; Henry Lawson Drive; Forest Road	Wahroonga	Pennant Hills; Carlingford; Parramatta; Villawood; Milperra; East Hills	Hurstville	49 km (30 mi)	Replaced by in 1974
Decommissioned or unsigned route
