= Ryde Road =

Road in Sydney, Australia

Ryde Road New South Wales
- Coordinates: 33.751009°S 151.147348°E (North end); 33.775588°S 151.135343°E (South end)

General information
- Type: Road
- Length: 3.3 km (2.1 mi)
- Gazetted: August 1928
- Route number(s): A3 (2013–present)
- Former route number: Metroad 3 (1993–2013); State Route 33 (1974–1993); Ring Road 3 (1964–1974)

Major junctions
- North end: Mona Vale Road; Pymble, Sydney
- Pacific Highway
- South end: Lane Cove Road; West Pymble, Sydney

Location(s)
- Major suburbs: Gordon; Pymble; West Pymble

Ryde Road is a 3.3-kilometre-long (2.1 mi) arterial road in the Ku-ring-gai Council local government area on the Upper North Shore region of Sydney, New South Wales, Australia. It is a constituent part of the A3 (Sydney) route.

== Route ==
Ryde Road commences at the interchange with Pacific Highway, between Pymble and Gordon, connecting through a tunnel under Pacific Highway from Mona Vale Road and heads in a southwesterly direction as a six-lane, dual-carriageway road, through the suburb of West Pymble. Ryde Road terminates at the De Burghs Bridge crossing the Lane Cove River, where the road continues south as Lane Cove Road.

Ryde Road forms the only road connection between the Ku-ring-gai and Ryde local government areas, and is one of only four road crossings of the Lane Cove River. It is often a traffic bottleneck.

== History ==
The road was built in the early 1900s, after the De Burghs Bridge across the steep valley formed by the Lane Cove River was opened in 1901, known at the time as The Broadway.

The passing of the Main Roads Act of 1924 through the Parliament of New South Wales provided for the declaration of Main Roads, roads partially funded by the State government through the Main Roads Board (later Transport for NSW). Main Road No. 162 was declared along Ryde Road (and continuing south along Lane Cove, Pittwater and Wicks Road through Ryde, and continuing north via St Ives to the intersection with Pittwater Road in Mona Vale) on 8 August 1928; with the passing of the Main Roads (Amendment) Act of 1929 to provide for additional declarations of State Highways and Trunk Roads, this was amended to Main Road 162 on 8 April 1929.

The Broadway was officially renamed Ryde Road, between Pacific Highway and De Burghs Bridge in West Pymble, on 27 February 1952.

Ryde Road was initially designated to become part of a major north–south metropolitan arterial route in 1964, when the route incorporating other existing local arterial roads from Mona Vale to Blakehurst were designated Ring Road 3. The De Burghs Bridge was upgraded to two large high-level multi-lane separate concrete bridges over the Lane Cove River, built alongside each other and replacing the ricketty wooden structure and winding approaches, opening on 15 December 1967. Ryde Road was partly realigned and re-constructed from two lanes to six lanes to Pacific Highway between 1967 and 1972. The grade-separation of the Pacific Highway junction, by building a tunnel under the highway and railway line connecting to Mona Vale Road, was completed in 1989.

The passing of the Roads Act of 1993 updated road classifications and the way they could be declared within New South Wales. Under this act, Ryde Road retains its declaration as part of Main Road 162.

Ryde Road was allocated part of Ring Road 3 in 1964, before it was replaced with State Route 33 in 1974, then re-designated part of Metroad 3 in April 1993. With the conversion to the newer alphanumeric system in 2013, Metroad 3 was replaced by route A3.

== Major intersections ==
LGA	Location	km	mi	Destinations	Notes
Ku-ring-gai	Pymble–Gordon boundary	0.0	0.0	Mona Vale Road (A3) – Terrey Hills, Mona Vale	Route A3 continues north along Mona Vale Road
Ku-ring-gai	Pymble–Gordon boundary	0.0	0.0	Pacific Highway (A1) – Wahroonga, Chatswood, North Sydney	
Ku-ring-gai	West Pymble	2.5	1.6	Yanko Road, to The Comenarra Parkway – Thornleigh	
Ku-ring-gai	West Pymble	3.0	1.9	Lady Game Drive – West Chatswood	
Lane Cove River		3.3	2.1	De Burghs Bridge	
Ryde	Macquarie Park	3.3	2.1	Lane Cove Road (A3) – Ryde, Wiley Park, Blakehurst	Route A3 continues south along Lane Cove Road
Route transition
