= Lane Cove Road =

Road in Sydney, New South Wales, Australia

Lane Cove Road New South Wales
- Coordinates: 33.775584°S 151.135324°E (Northeast end); 33.810274°S 151.106029°E (Southwest end)

General information
- Type: Road
- Length: 4.9 km (3.0 mi)
- Gazetted: August 1928
- Route number(s): A3 (2013–present)
- Former route number: Metroad 3 (1993–2013); State Route 33 (1974–1993); Ring Road 3 (1964–1974)

Major junctions
- Northeast end: Ryde Road; Macquarie Park, Sydney
- M2 Hills Motorway; Epping Road
- Southwest end: Devlin Street; Ryde, Sydney

Location(s)
- Major suburbs: North Ryde

Lane Cove Road is a 4.9-kilometre-long (3.0 mi) major suburban arterial road through North Ryde in Sydney, New South Wales, Australia. It is a constituent part of the A3 route.

== Route ==
Lane Cove Road commences at the De Burghs Bridge, crossing the Lane Cove River at Macquarie Park and connecting with Ryde Road, and heads in a southwesterly direction as a six-lane, dual-carriageway road, crossing M2 Hills Motorway, and then Epping Road at a grade-separated intersection in North Ryde shortly afterwards. Lane Cove Road terminates at the intersection of Devlin Street and Blaxland Road at Top Ryde, where the road continues south along Devlin Street.

Lane Cove Road is the main access road from the central and southern suburbs of Sydney to the North Ryde/Macquarie Park commercial and industrial area, carrying a large volume of traffic and becoming very congested during morning and afternoon/evening peak hour.

== History ==
The passing of the Main Roads Act of 1924 through the Parliament of New South Wales provided for the declaration of Main Roads, roads partially funded by the State government through the Main Roads Board (later Transport for NSW). Main Road No. 162 was declared along Wicks, Pittwater and Lane Cove Roads through Ryde (and continuing north along The Broadway - renamed Ryde Road in 1952 - through Gordon, then via St. Ives to the intersection with Pittwater Road in Mona Vale) on 8 August 1928; with the passing of the Main Roads (Amendment) Act of 1929 to provide for additional declarations of State Highways and Trunk Roads, this was amended to Main Road 162 on 8 April 1929.

The Broadway, on the other side of De Burghs Bridge, was officially renamed Ryde Road on 27 February 1952. Ryde Council later constructed a new alignment through Ryde, changing from Wicks and Pittwater Roads to today's Lane Cove Road in September 1961.

Lane Cove Road was initially designated to become part of a major north–south metropolitan arterial route in 1964, when the route incorporating other existing local arterial roads from Mona Vale to Blakehurst were designated Ring Road 3. The De Burghs Bridge was upgraded to two large high-level multi-lane separate concrete bridges over the Lane Cove River, built alongside each other and replacing the ricketty wooden structure and winding approaches, opening on 15 December 1967. The intersection with Epping Road at North Ryde was re-constructed into a grade-separated interchange in 1978.

The passing of the Roads Act of 1993 updated road classifications and the way they could be declared within New South Wales. Under this act, Lane Cove Road retains its declaration as part of Main Road 162.

Lane Cove Road was allocated part of Ring Road 3 in 1964, before it was replaced with State Route 33 in 1974, then re-designated part of Metroad 3 in April 1993. With the conversion to the newer alphanumeric system in 2013, Metroad 3 was replaced by route A3.

== Major intersections ==
LGA	Location	km	mi	Destinations	Notes
Ku-ring-gai	West Pymble	0.0	0.0	Ryde Road (A3) – Pymble, Mona Vale	Route A3 continues north along Ryde Road
Lane Cove River		0.0	0.0	De Burghs Bridge	
Ryde	Macquarie Park	0.7	0.43	M2 Hills Motorway (M2) – Baulkham Hills, Carlingford, Lane Cove	No westbound exit from motorway onto Lane Cove Road
Ryde	Macquarie Park–North Ryde boundary	1.7	1.1	Epping Road – Epping, Lane Cove	
Ryde	Ryde	4.9	3.0	Blaxland Road – Epping	No right turn southbound into Blaxland Road
Ryde	Ryde	4.9	3.0	Devlin Street (A3) – Rhodes, Wiley Park, Blakehurst	Route A3 continues southwest along Devlin Street
Incomplete access; Tolled; Route transition
