= A3 (Sydney) =

Road in New South Wales, Australia

A3 (numerous constituent roads) New South Wales

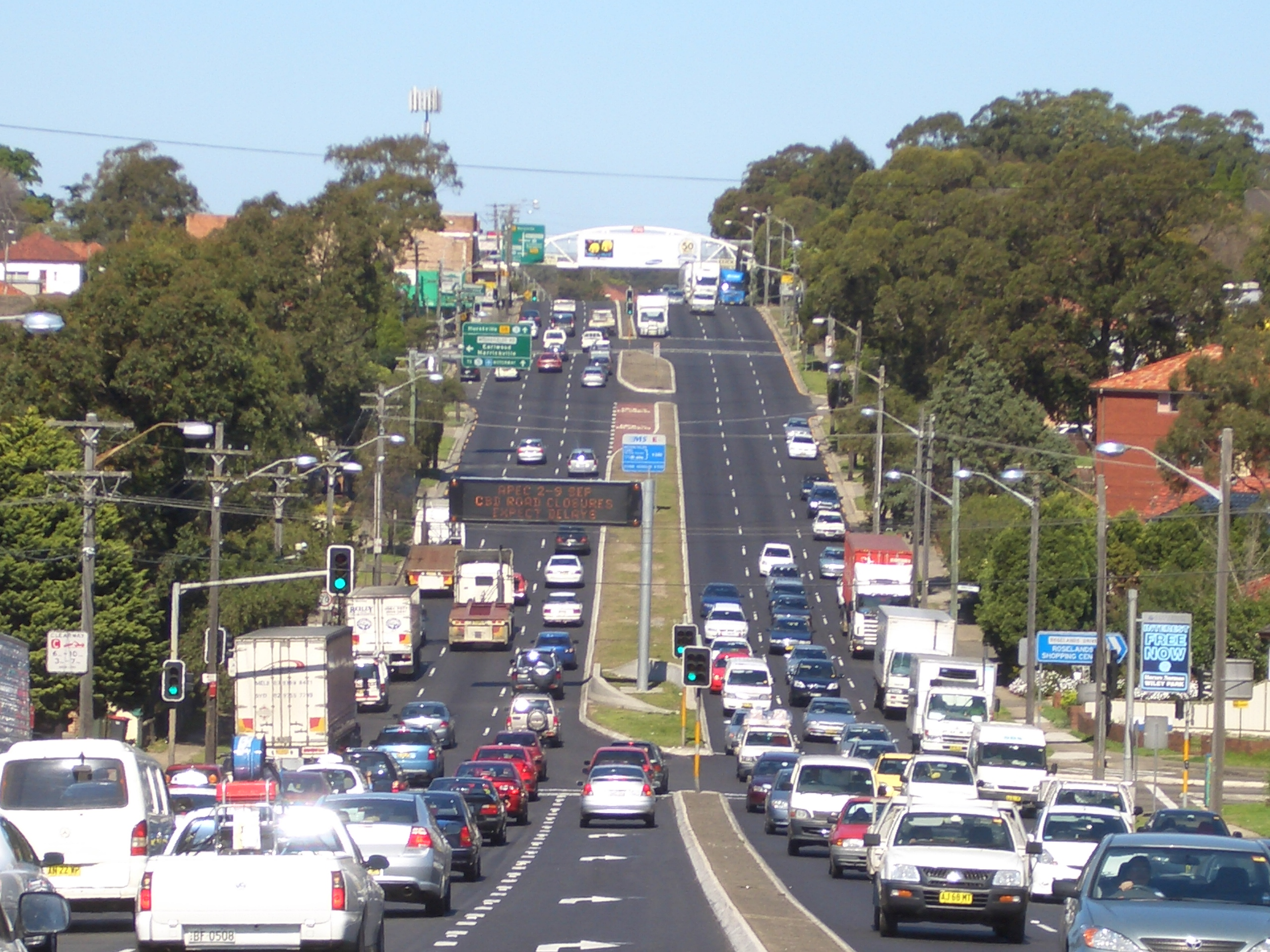
- Looking south along King Georges Road at Roselands
- Location in metropolitan Sydney
- Coordinates: 33.679336°S 151.302743°E (North end); 33.987888°S 151.111717°E (South end)

General information
- Type: Road
- Length: 51.3 km (32 mi)
- Gazetted: August 1928
- Route number(s): A3 (2013–present)
- Former route number: Metroad 3 (1993–2013); State Route 33 (1974–1993); Ring Road 3 (1964–1974); (Mona Vale–Rhodes, Wiley Park–Blakehurst); Metroad 3 (1993–2013); State Route 33 (1992–1993); (Rhodes–Wiley Park)

Major junctions
- North end: Pittwater Road; Mona Vale, Sydney
- Pacific Highway; Hills Motorway; Western Motorway; Great Western Highway; Hume Highway; South Western Motorway
- South end: Princes Highway; Blakehurst, Sydney

Location(s)
- Major suburbs: Terrey Hills, Pymble, Macquarie Park, Ryde, Rhodes, Sydney Olympic Park, Chullora, Wiley Park, Beverly Hills, Hurstville

Highway system
- Highways in Australia; National Highway • Freeways in Australia; Highways in New South Wales

The A3 is a route designation of a major metropolitan arterial route through suburban Sydney, connecting the A8 at Mona Vale at its northern end, to Princes Highway at Blakehurst at its southern end. This name covers a few consecutive roads and is widely known to most drivers, but the entire allocation is also known – and signposted – by the names of its constituent parts: Mona Vale Road, Ryde Road, Lane Cove Road, Devlin Street, Church Street, Concord Road, Homebush Bay Drive, Centenary Drive, Roberts Road, Wiley Avenue and King Georges Road.

It is a major connector between most of the major radial routes emanating from central Sydney, and a major link between the northern and southern parts of the Sydney tolled orbital freeway. It is the most direct, although not necessarily the quickest, route across Sydney in order to travel between the South Coast and North Coast of New South Wales. It is one of only three road connections between the Northern Beaches region of Sydney and the rest of Sydney (the other two being routes A38 and A8.

== Route ==
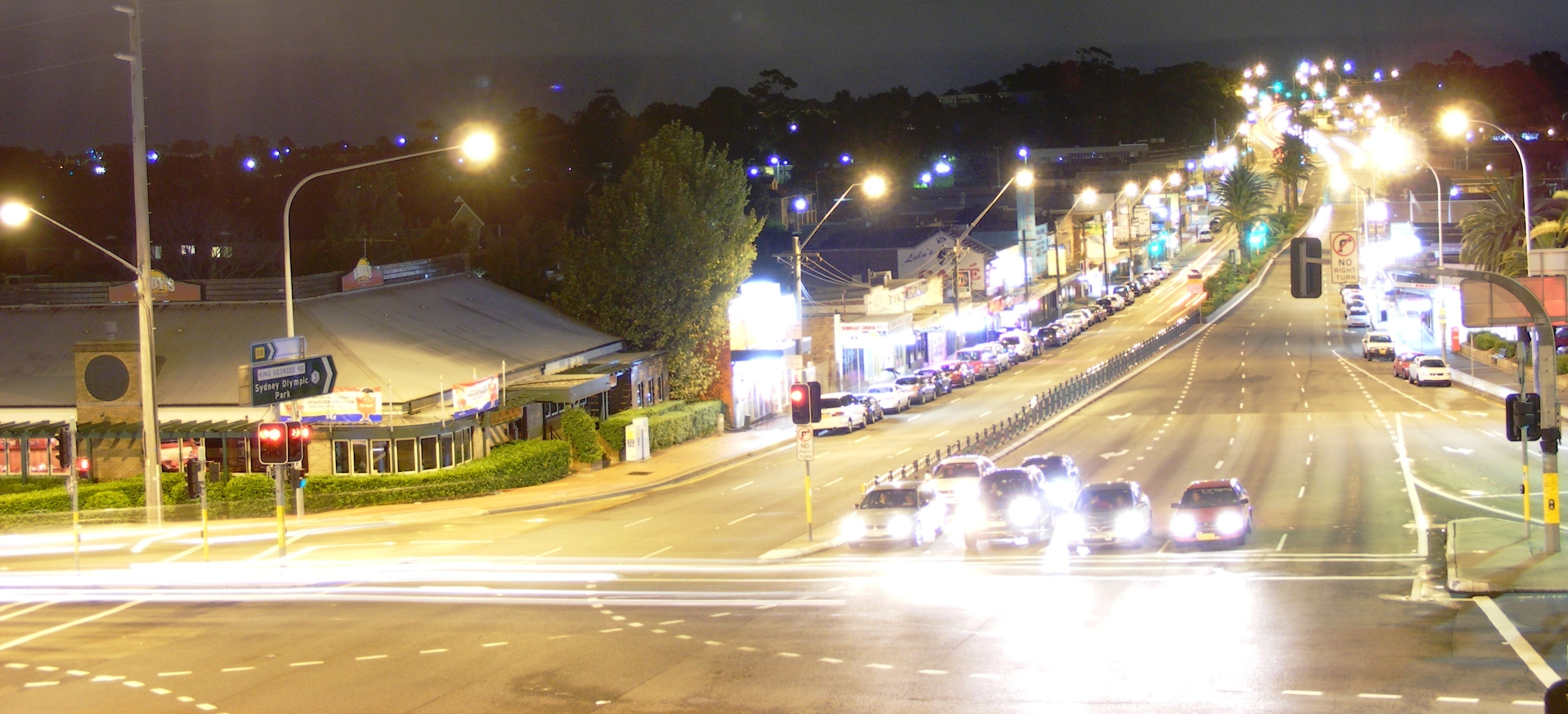
A3 (King Georges Road) in Beverly Hills

The A3 commences at the intersection of Pittwater Road at Mona Vale and heads in a southwesterly direction as Mona Vale Road, mostly as a four-lane, dual carriageway road, widening to a six-lane, dual-carriageway road at North St Ives, before passing under Pacific Highway at an interchange at Pymble. It changes name to Ryde Road and continues in a southerly direction, crossing the Lane Cove River over De Burghs Bridge and changing name again, to Lane Cove Road, before crossing M2 Hills Motorway at Macquarie Park and then Epping Road in North Ryde shortly afterwards. It changes name again to Devlin Street at the intersection with Blaxland Road at Ryde, and then runs under Victoria Road at an interchange shortly after, before changing name again to Church Street, crossing Parramatta River over Ryde Bridge, and changing name to Concord Road.

In Rhodes, it changes name to Homebush Bay Drive and heads in a southerly direction, crossing M4 Motorway and changing name again to Centenary Drive, then over Great Western Highway a short distance south of Sydney Olympic Park. Marlborough Road, which serves as an on-off ramp on both sides of the main roadway in the vicinity of the Flemington Markets, and the associated loop road, is part of the route designation.

It crosses over Hume Highway at Strathfield South, where it changes name to Roberts Road, and continues south to Greenacre, where it diverts southeast and changes name again to Wiley Avenue, then very shortly after it meets Punchbowl Road at Lakemba, where it changes name for the last time to King Georges Road and continues in a southeasterly direction. It crosses the M5 Motorway at Beverly Hills, and continues southeast, narrowing from six to four lanes at Woniora Rd, then widening back to six lanes at Greenacre Road, before eventually terminating at the Princes Highway at Blakehurst.

Much of the route becomes very congested in peak hour. The highest speed limit on the A3 is 90 km/h (56 mph) on a rural section of Mona Vale Road (between Mona Vale and St Ives).

== History ==
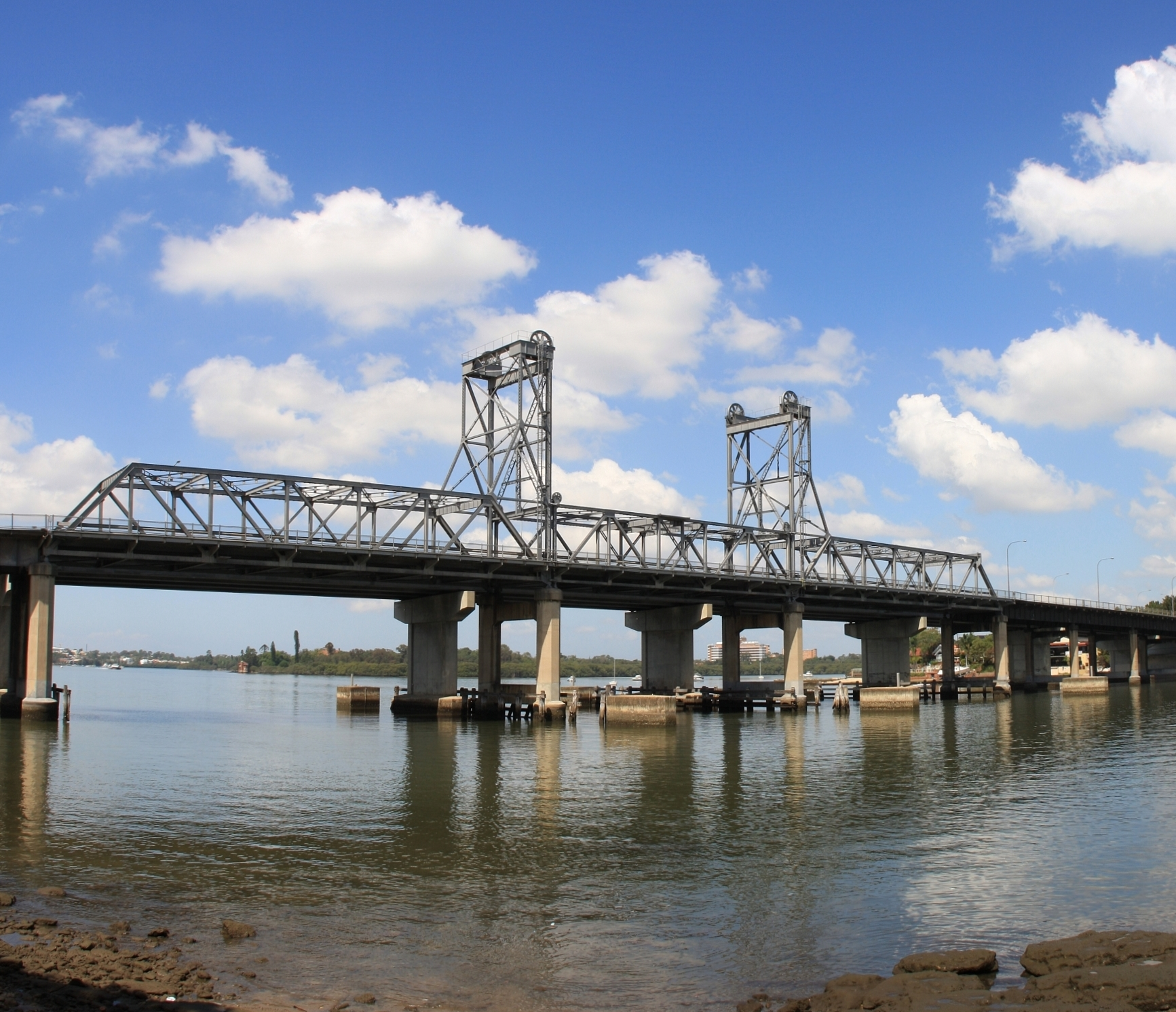
Ryde Bridge is part of the A3 route

The passing of the Main Roads Act of 1924 through the Parliament of New South Wales provided for the declaration of Main Roads, roads partially funded by the State government through the Main Roads Board. Main Road No. 139 was declared along Devlin Street between Gladesville Road (today Blaxland Road) in Ryde (and continuing northwards via Eastwood and Epping to the intersection with Pennant Hills Road in Pennant Hills), Main Road No. 162 was declared along Wicks, Pittwater and Lane Cove Roads through Ryde, Ryde Road through Gordon, then via St. Ives to the intersection with Pittwater Road in Mona Vale, and Main Road No. 200 was declared from the intersection of Great Western Highway and Concord Road in Concord, along Concord Road to Parramatta River (using the punt service between Rhodes and Meadowbanks) then along Bowden Street to Parramatta Road (today Victoria Road), on the same day, 8 August 1928, and Main Road 315 was declared on 19 February 1929, from the intersection with Great Western Highway south along Concord Road through Strathfield, The Boulevard, Punchbowl Road, Wiley Avenue, Canary Road, Dumbleton Road and Belmore Road to Hurstville then diverging to continue south along Woniora Road (due to the state of Belmore Road between Woniora Road and Greenacre Road) to meet Princes Highway at Blakehurst; with the passing of the Main Roads (Amendment) Act of 1929 to provide for additional declarations of State Highways and Trunk Roads, these were amended to Main Roads 139 and 162 and 200 and 315 on 8 April 1929.

The punt service across Parramatta River was replaced by Ryde Bridge in 1935, changing the alignment to today's route of Concord Road, which was extended northward from Kiloola St to the new bridge to replace the route to the punt via Blaxland Road, and along Church Street to meet Devlin Street in Ryde (which was a new route from Church St to Blaxland Road) on 19 March 1935.

In 1972 a bypass of Strathfield town centre was completed by extending Raw Square (the road connecting to the underpass of the Main Western railway immediately west of Strathfield station) southward to Redmyre Road. Redmyre Road in turn connects to The Boulevarde.

Notwithstanding this bypass, congestion in Strathfield town centre remained at a high level, and so between 1983 and 1998 a major deviation of the route was built. It relocated the arterial route well to the west of Strathfield, running from Rhodes to Wiley Park, to bypass Strathfield and improve access to the Olympic Precinct at Homebush Bay. Called the "Strathfield Bypass" at the time, the deviation route included the new Homebush Bay Drive and Centenary Drive (named for the centenary of Strathfield Municipality), and an upgraded Roberts Road though Chullora and Greenacre, connecting to King Georges Road near Wiley Park. The road upgrades, new bridges and connections for this deviation were completed in stages between 1983 and 1998.

Also during this period, Ryde Bridge over the Parramatta River between Ryde and Rhodes was duplicated (1988), grade-separate interchanges were constructed at the Pacific Highway at Pymble (grade separation completed in 1989). As a major access route to Sydney Olympic Park, a grade-separated crossing was constructed at the M4 Motorway and Parramatta Road, at Flemington (1992) and the intersection with Australia Avenue and Underwood Road at Homebush (1998). Grade-separated crossings were also constructed at M2 Hills Motorway at Macquarie Park (1997), at Victoria Road at Top Ryde (1998), the Hume Highway at Chullora (1998), and the M5 Motorway at Beverly Hills (2001).

== Route Naming & Numbering ==
Main Road 162 was officially named Mona Vale Road, between Pittwater Road in Mona Vale and Pacific Highway Pymble, on 10 January 1951, and Ryde Road, between Pacific Highway and De Burghs Bridge in West Pymble (previously known as The Broadway), on 27 February 1952. Main Road 315 was officially named King Georges Road, between Punchbowl Road in Lakemba and Princes Highway in Blakehurst (previously known as Wiley Avenue, Canary Road, Dumbleton Road and Belmore Road), on 24 September 1952, and Main Road 200 was officially named Church Street, between Devlin Street in Ryde and Ryde Bridge, on 6 May 1953. Ryde Council later constructed a new alignment from Quarry Road to Bridge Road through Ryde, changing from Wicks and Pittwater Roads to today's Lane Cove Road in September 1961. The southern end of Main Road 315 between Hurstville and Blakehurst was realigned to follow the entire length of King Georges Road (and terminate at Princes Highway some distance south of its previous termination at Woniora Road) on 11 November 1964 following reconstruction between Woniora and Greenacre Roads.

What is now called A3 was initially designated to become a major north–south metropolitan arterial route in 1964, when the route incorporating the existing local arterial roads above was designated Ring Road 3. After 1964, upgrading projects were commenced, with the construction of new De Burghs Bridges over the Lane Cove River between Pymble and Ryde (1967). A grade-separated crossing was constructed at Epping Road at North Ryde (1978).

On 22 January 1993, the southern end of the designated Main Road 200 route was altered, from its earlier alignment along Concord Road between Ryde Bridge and Strathfield, to Homebush Bay Drive, Centenary Drive, Roberts Road, Wiley Avenue and King Georges Road, to terminate at the Princes Highway at Blakehurst, subsuming the southern half of Main Road 315 (its northern half, along Punchbowl Road, was designated as part of Main Road 549, and from Stathfield along The Boulevarde, it was redesignated as Main Road 668, which was also routed north along the former alignment of Main Road 200, from Strathfield along Concord Road to meet Homebush Bay Drive just south of Ryde Bridge),

The passing of the Roads Act of 1993 updated road classifications and the way they could be declared within New South Wales. Under this act, the A3 retains its declaration as Main Roads 139 (as Devlin Street), 162 (as Lane Cove, Ryde and Mona Vale Roads), and Main Road 200 (Church Street, Homebush Bay and Centenary Drives, Roberts Road, Wiley Avenue and King Georges Road).

The route was designated as Ring Road 3 in 1964, and redesignated as state route 33 in 1974. The new alignment via Homebush Bay and Centenary Drives and Roberts Road was designated as part of state route 33 in December 1992. The earlier alignment through Strathfield (along The Boulevarde and Punchbowl Road, along Main Roads 549 and 668) was redesignated as state route 27, but was de-designated in 2004.

The whole route was redesignated Metroad 3 in April 1993, one of Sydney's only Metroad routes not to have changed alignment since their introduction. With the conversion to the alphanumeric system in 2013, Metroad 3 was redesignated as route A3.

== Exits and interchanges ==
LGA	Location	km	mi	Destinations	Notes
Northern Beaches	Mona Vale	0.0	0.0	Pittwater Road (A8 south, unallocated north) – Palm Beach, Church Point, Dee Why, Cremorne	Northern terminus of route A3; Northern end of Mona Vale Road
Northern Beaches	Terrey Hills	8.1	5.0	McCarrs Creek Road – Cottage Point, Church Point	
Northern Beaches	Terrey Hills–Belrose boundary	10.5	6.5	Myoora Road (north) – Terrey Hills; Forest Way (south) – Frenchs Forest	
Ku-ring-gai	Pymble–Gordon boundary	20.1	12.5	North Shore railway line	
Ku-ring-gai	Pymble–Gordon boundary	20.2	12.6	Pacific Highway (A1) – Wahroonga, Chatswood, North Sydney	Southern end of Mona Vale Road; Northern end of Ryde Road
Lane Cove River		23.4	14.5	De Burghs Bridge	
Ryde	Macquarie Park	24.1	15.0	M2 Hills Motorway (M2) – Baulkham Hills, Carlingford, Lane Cove	No westbound exit from motorway onto Lane Cove Road
Ryde	Macquarie Park–North Ryde boundary	25.0	15.5	Epping Road – Epping, Lane Cove	
Ryde	Ryde	28.2	17.5	Blaxland Road (north) – Epping	No right turn northbound into Blaxland Road; Southern end of Lane Cove Road; Northern end of Devlin Street
Ryde	Ryde	28.9	18.0	Victoria Road (A40) – Parramatta, Gladesville, Rozelle	Southern end of Devlin Street; Northern end of Church Street
Parramatta River		30.0	18.6	Ryde Bridge	
Canada Bay	Rhodes–Concord West boundary	31.6	19.6	Concord Road – Strathfield	
Canada Bay	Rhodes–Concord West boundary	31.9	19.8	Main Northern railway line	
Powells Creek		33.5	20.8	Bridge (no known official name)	
Canada Bay	Sydney Olympic Park–Homebush boundary	34.1	21.2	Australia Avenue (west) – Sydney Olympic Park; Underwood Road (east) – Homebush	
Canada Bay–Strathfield boundary	Sydney Olympic Park–Homebush West boundary	34.8	21.6	M4 Western Motorway (M4) – Penrith, Parramatta, Ashfield	Southern end of Homebush Bay Drive; Northern end of Centenary Drive
Strathfield	Homebush West	35.0	21.7	Great Western Highway (A44) – Penrith, Parramatta, Haymarket	Access via Marlborough Road
Strathfield	Homebush West	35.7	22.2	Main Suburban railway line	
Strathfield–Canterbury-Bankstown boundary	Greenacre–Strathfield–Strathfield South tripoint	38.3	23.8	Hume Highway (A22) – Prestons, Liverpool, Ashfield	Southern end of Centenary Drive; Northern end of Roberts Road
Strathfield–Canterbury-Bankstown boundary	Greenacre–Strathfield–Strathfield South tripoint	38.3	23.8	Flemington-Campsie Goods Line	
Canterbury-Bankstown	Greenacre	41.7	25.9	Roberts Road (south) – Punchbowl	Southern end of Roberts Road; Northern end of Wiley Avenue
Canterbury-Bankstown	Punchbowl–Lakemba–Wiley Park tripoint	41.9	26.0	Punchbowl Road – Punchbowl, Strathfield South	Southern end of Wiley Avenue; Northern end of King Georges Road
Canterbury-Bankstown	Wiley Park	42.6	26.5	Bankstown railway line	
Canterbury-Bankstown	Wiley Park–Roselands boundary	43.4	27.0	Canterbury Road (A34) – Liverpool, Punchbowl, Canterbury	
Canterbury-Bankstown–Georges River boundary	Beverly Hills	45.0	28.0	South Western Motorway (M5 west) – Liverpool, Canberra; East Motorway (M5 east) – Sydney Airport	
Georges River	Beverly Hills	45.8	28.5	East Hills railway line	
Georges River	Penshurst–Hurstville boundary	47.8	29.7	Forest Road – Lugarno, Arncliffe	
Georges River	Penshurst–Hurstville boundary	48.0	29.8	Illawarra railway line	
Georges River	Blakehurst	51.3	31.9	Stuart Street – Blakehurst	
Georges River	Blakehurst	51.3	31.9	Princes Highway (A1) – Newtown, Heathcote, Wollongong	Southern terminus of route A3; Southern end of King Georges Road
Tolled; Route transition
