= De Burghs Bridge =

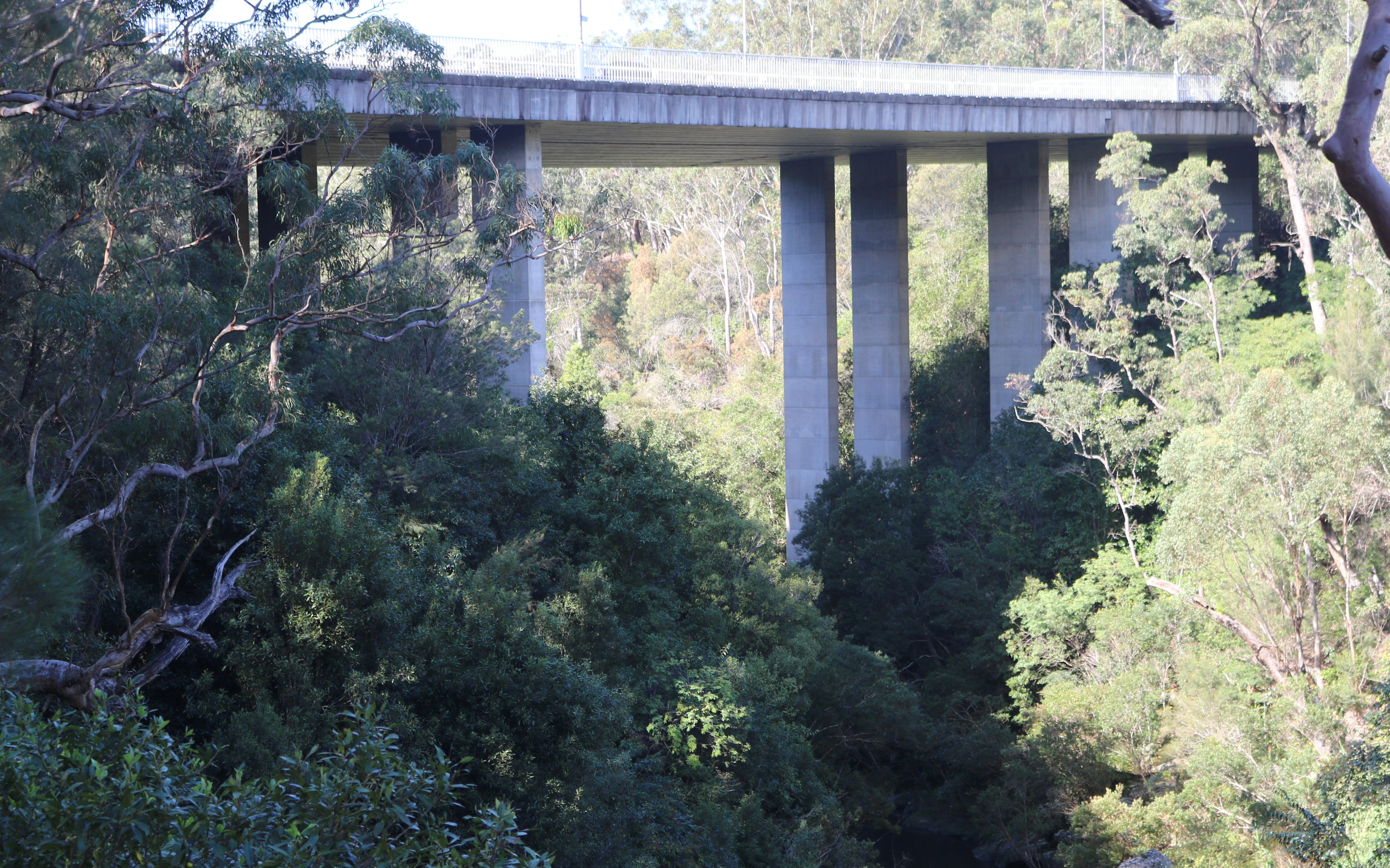
- Viewed from the Great North Walk
- Coordinates: 33°46′32″S 151°08′07″E
- Carries: Lane Cove Road (A3): Motor vehicles; Pedestrians
- Crosses: Lane Cove River
- Locale: Macquarie Park, New South Wales, Australia
- Named for: Ernest de Burgh
- Owner: Transport for NSW
- Followed by: Fullers Bridge

Characteristics
- Material: Concrete
- Total length: 185 metres (607 ft)
- Width: 29.3 metres (96 ft)
- No. of lanes: 3 (north); 3 (south)

History
- Constructed by: Hornibrook
- Opened: 15 December 1967
- Replaces: De Burghs Bridge (first bridge)

Location
- Interactive map of De Burghs Bridge

De Burghs Bridge is a road bridge that carries the Lane Cove Road, part of the A3, across the Lane Cove River in Macquarie Park, New South Wales, Australia. The bridge stretches from Macquarie Park in the south to West Pymble in the north.

== History ==
The current De Burghs Bridge is the second bridge with this name to cross the Lane Cove River in this area.

=== First bridge ===
Old De Burghs Bridge
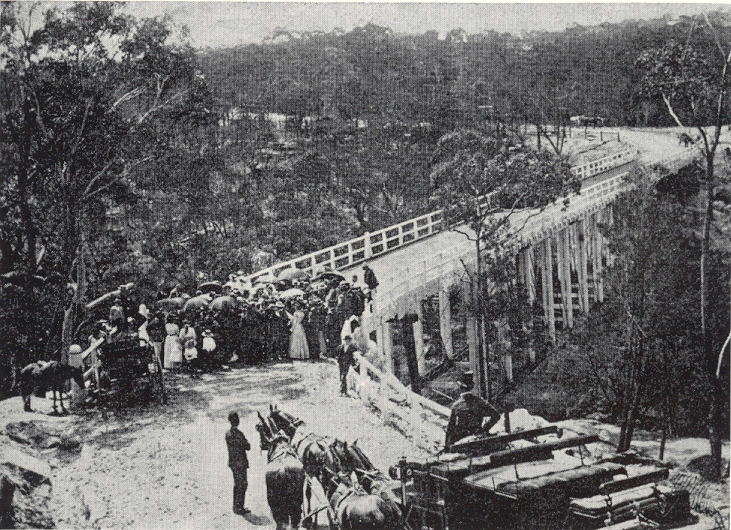
- Opening of old De Burghs Bridge in 1901
- Coordinates: 33°46′33″S 151°08′10″E
- Carried: Lane Cove Road
- Crossed: Lane Cove River
- Other name: Lane Cove Bridge
- Named for: Ernest de Burgh
- Followed by: Fullers Bridge

Characteristics
- Design: Truss bridge
- Material: Timber
- Total length: 90.8 metres (298 ft)
- Width: 5.5 metres (18 ft)
- Longest span: 50 metres (165 ft)
- Clearance below: 30 metres (100 ft)

History
- Designer: Ernest de Burgh
- Opened: 22 December 1900
- Inaugurated: 23 February 1901
- Collapsed: 1994 (bushfire)
- Closed: 14 December 1967
- Replaced: Older east/west bridge
- Replaced by: 2nd De Burghs Bridge

Location
- Interactive map of Old De Burghs Bridge

References
- (Note: Map shows Pittwater Road continuing past the cemetery and turning west across a bridge over the Lane Cove River.)

The first bridge with this name was designed in 1899 by Ernest de Burgh, after whom the bridge is named, and was opened on 23 February 1901. It was situated downstream from the current bridge, within metres at the southern end, and about 20 metres (66 ft) away from the current bridge at the northern end. The single De Burgh timber truss bridge was 91 metres (300 ft) in length, and the largest truss was 50 metres (165 ft), the longest timber truss span ever built in Australia.

The old bridge was destroyed by bushfire in January 1994. The northern abutment on the ground is still visible, as are parts of the supporting piers. The new bridge offers a vantage point to view the remnants of the original structure.

=== Second bridge ===
The bridge was replaced by two large high-level multi-lane separate concrete bridges, built alongside each other, that opened on 15 December 1967. The current bridge is a six-lane bridge that, unlike the original timber truss, is perpendicular to the river. This demonstrates how far road and bridge building had progressed by the 1960s, as previously it was dictated by the form of the land. One can see how the newer road and bridge is built right over any land formations, in contrast to the winding old road.

De Burghs Bridge is similar in form and function to Roseville Bridge, being a high-level multi-lane bridge replacing a low level, narrow bridge as well as windy approach roads.

De Burghs Bridge is an important part of the A3, a significant north–south artery across metropolitan Sydney which is the next road that connects the northern suburbs and the lower northern suburbs after (to the east of) Pennant Hills Road. The bridge carries three lanes of traffic each way and a pedestrian walkway on either side of the bridge. A plaque placed on the bridge pays tribute to the old bridge. It was placed there in 1988 before the destruction of the old bridge.

== See also ==
- List of bridges in Sydney
