= Ryde Bridge =

Bridges across the Parramatta River in Sydney, Australia

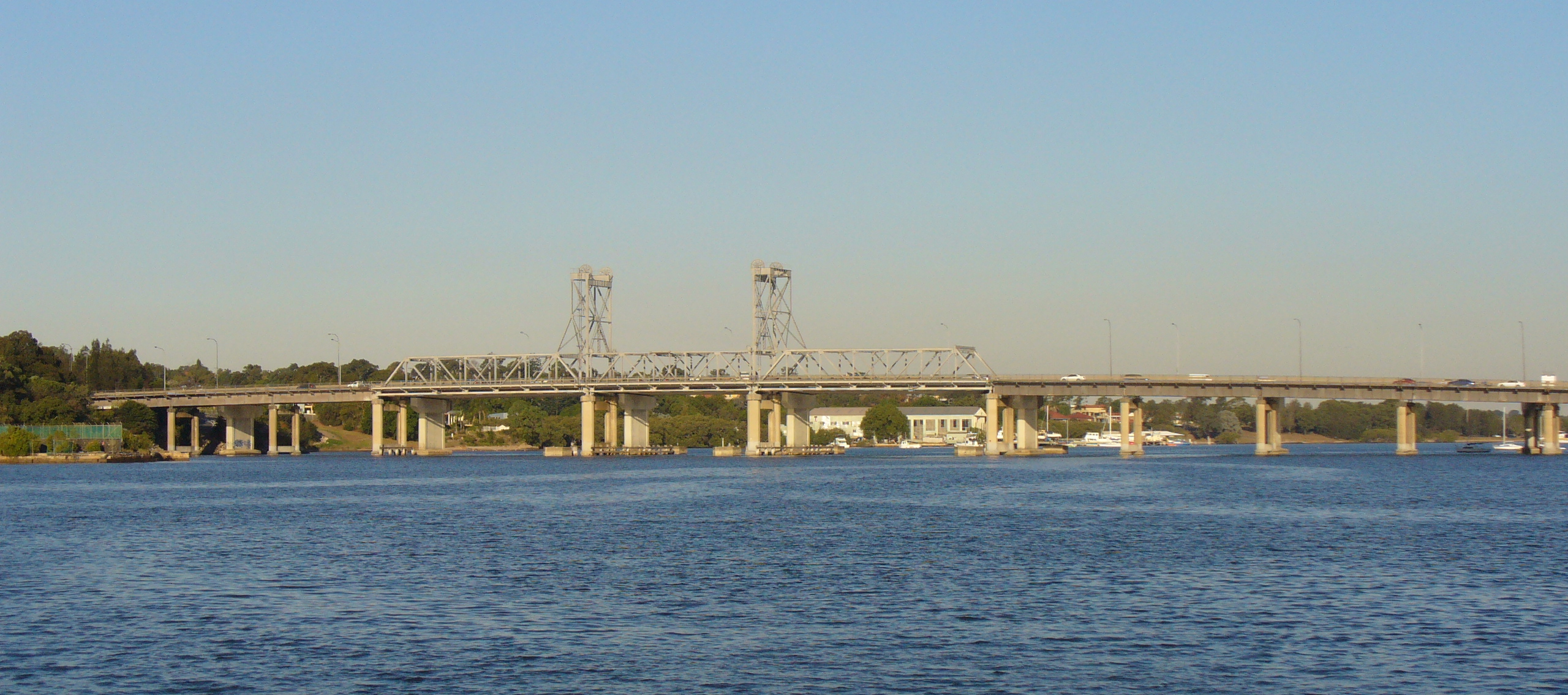
- Ryde Bridge, viewed from Meadowbank in 2006
- Coordinates: 33°49′25″S 151°05′42″E
- Carries: Concord Road: Motor vehicles; Grade-separated pedestrian footpath
- Crosses: Parramatta River
- Locale: Ryde, Sydney, New South Wales, Australia
- Begins: Ryde (north)
- Ends: Rhodes (south)
- Other name: Uhrs Point Bridge
- Named for: Ryde
- Owner: Transport for NSW
- Heritage status: Transport for NSW heritage and conservation register
- Preceded by: Meadowbank Railway Bridge
- Followed by: Mortlake Ferry

Characteristics
- Design: 1. Pratt truss with inoperable lift span (west); 2. Fixed-span bridge (east)
- Material: 1. Steel (west); 2. Reinforced concrete (east)
- Pier construction: 1. Reinforced concrete octagonal columns (west); 2. Concrete (east)
- No. of lanes: 6: 3 lanes each bridge

History
- Designer: Department of Main Roads
- Construction start: 1. 1931; 2. 1987
- Inaugurated: 1. 7 December 1935 by the NSW Premier Bertram Stevens (west); 2. 25 November 1988 by the NSW Premier Nick Greiner and Minister for Transport Ralph Willis (east)
- Replaces: 1. Man-powered punt (1896–1935) (west); 2. Single carriageway Ryde Bridge (1935–1988) (east)

Statistics
- Toll: 1935–1948

Location
- Interactive map of Ryde Bridge

The Ryde Bridge, also called the Uhrs Point Bridge, are two road bridges that carry Concord Road, part of the A3, across Parramatta River from Ryde in the northern suburbs of Sydney to Rhodes in Sydney's inner west, in New South Wales, Australia.

The two bridges comprise a heritage-listed steel Pratt truss bridge with inoperable lift span that carries three lanes of northbound vehicular traffic plus a grade-separated pedestrian footpath, completed in 1935; and a reinforced concrete fixed-span bridge that carries three lanes of southbound vehicular traffic, completed in 1988.

== History ==
A proposal for the construction of a bridge in lieu of a ferry over the Parramatta River, between Meadowbank and Rhodes, was first submitted to the minister for public works in 1913. Owing to funds being unavailable for the purpose, no action was taken until 1920. In July 1924, the minister for public works announced in parliament that he was prepared to introduce a bill to give the involved councils the power to build the bridge. A site investigation followed, and its results was transferred to the Main Roads Board in July 1928.

The original Ryde Bridge was opened on 7 December 1935 by the Premier of New South Wales, Bertram Stevens, accompanied by the mayor of Ryde. The original bridge is a lift bridge, which was required to allow shipping to pass to the State Timber Yard then located on the southern bank of the Parramatta River, just west of the bridge. However the lifting mechanism was removed in the late 20th century and it has not been opened since. The bridge was paid for by the Ryde council with the assistance of a grant from the Government of New South Wales. The bridge carried a toll for 13 years until the bridge was paid for. In 1948, ownership of the bridge was transferred to the Department of Main Roads. The bridge operated with a reversible lane.

A new bridge was built on the eastern or downstream side using steel trough girders, closed on top by a composite concrete running deck was built by Enpro Constructions. The second bridge carries southbound traffic, with the original bridge carrying northbound traffic only. It was officially opened on 25 November 1988 by premier Nick Greiner and federal minister for transport Ralph Willis.

Before the original bridge was constructed, the Parramatta River was crossed in this area by a vehicular punt, just downstream of the Meadowbank Railway Bridge. The southern ramp still exists near the southern end of the railway bridge, however the northern ramp has been covered over by Meadowbank ferry wharf.
