= King Georges Road, Sydney =

Road in Sydney, Australia

King Georges Road New South Wales
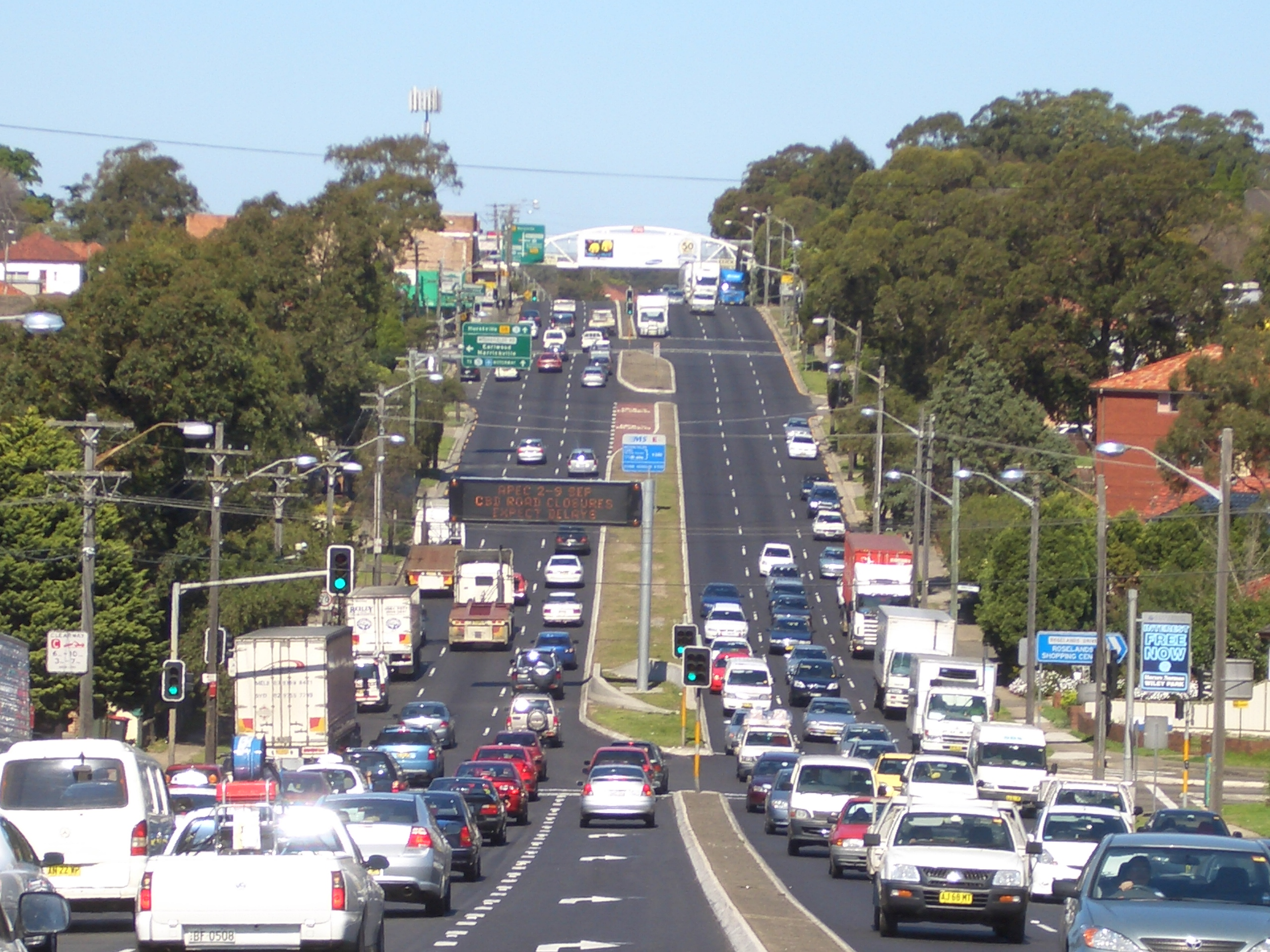
- King Georges Road, Roselands
- Coordinates: 33.917494°S 151.065112°E (Northwest end); 33.987885°S 151.111722°E (Southeast end)

General information
- Type: Road
- Length: 9.0 km (5.6 mi)
- Gazetted: February 1929
- Route number(s): A3 (2013–present)
- Former route number: Metroad 3 (1993–2013); State Route 33 (1974–1993); Ring Road 3 (1964–1974)

Major junctions
- Northwest end: Wiley Avenue; Wiley Park, Sydney
- South Western Motorway; M5 East Motorway
- Southeast end: Princes Highway; Blakehurst, Sydney

Location(s)
- Major suburbs: Roselands, Beverly Hills, Penshurst, Hurstville

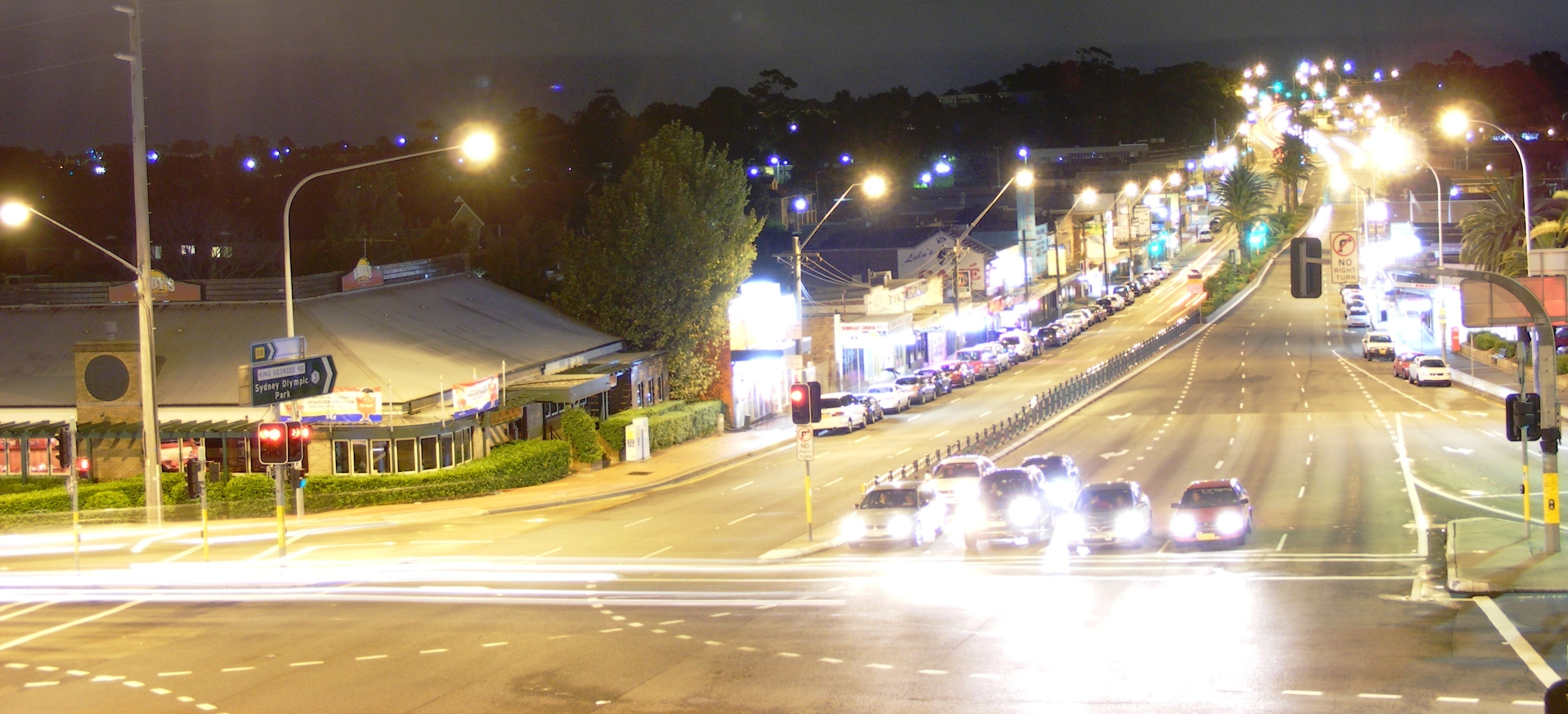
King Georges Road, Beverly Hills

King Georges Road is a 9.0-kilometre-long (5.6 mi) major suburban arterial road through south-western Sydney, Australia. It is a constituent part of the A3 route.

== Route ==
King Georges Road commences at the intersection of Wiley Avenue and Punchbowl Road in Wiley Park and heads in a southeasterly direction as a six-lane, dual-carriageway road, meeting Canterbury Road at Roselands. After crossing M5 Motorway at Beverly Hills, the road narrows to a four-lane, single-carriageway road before eventually terminating at an intersection with Princes Highway at Hurstville.

== History ==
The passing of the Main Roads Act of 1924 through the Parliament of New South Wales provided for the declaration of Main Roads, roads partially funded by the State government through the Main Roads Board (later Transport for NSW). Main Road 315 was declared on 19 February 1929, from the intersection with Wiley Avenue and Punchbowl Road along Wiley Avenue, Canary Road and Belmore Road to Hurstville (and continuing south along Woniora Road to meet Princes Highway at Blakehurst, and continuing north along Punchbowl Road, The Boulevarde, Concord Road, to Great Western Highway in Strathfield); with the passing of the Main Roads (Amendment) Act of 1929 to provide for additional declarations of State Highways and Trunk Roads, this was amended to Main Road 315 on 8 April 1929.

Previously known as Wiley's Ave between Punchbowl Road and Canterbury Road, Canary's Road between Canterbury Road and Beverly Hills, Dumbleton Road between Beverly Hills and Penshurst, and Belmore Road between Penshurst and Blakehurst, it was renamed King Georges Road, between Punchbowl Road in Lakemba and Princes Highway in Blakehurst on 24 September 1952, in honour of the late King George VI who had died the previous February. The southern end of Main Road 315 between Hurstville and Blakeville was later re-aligned to follow the entire length of King Georges Road (and terminate at Princes Highway some distance south than its previous intersection at Woniora Road) on 11 November 1964.

King Georges Road was initially designated to become part of a major north–south metropolitan arterial route in 1964, when the route incorporating other existing local arterial roads from Mona Vale to Blakehurst were designated Ring Road 3.

King Georges Road was re-gazetted to become part of Main Road 200 (continuing north along Wiley Avenue, Roberts Road, Centenary and Homebush Bay Drives), subsuming the southern half of Main Road 315 (its northern half along Punchbowl Road, was made part of Main Road 549, and from Stathfield along The Boulevard, was replaced by part of Main Road 668), on 22 January 1993.

The passing of the Roads Act of 1993 updated road classifications and the way they could be declared within New South Wales. Under this act, King Georges Road retains its declaration as part of Main Road 200.

King Georges Road was allocated part of Ring Road 3 in 1964, before it was replaced with State Route 33 in 1974, then re-designated part of Metroad 3 in April 1993. With the conversion to the newer alphanumeric system in 2013, Metroad 3 was replaced by route A3.

== Major intersections ==
LGA	Location	km	mi	Destinations	Notes
Canterbury-Bankstown	Punchbowl–Lakemba–Wiley Park tripoint	0.0	0.0	Wiley Avenue – Greenacre, North Ryde, Mona Vale	Route A3 continues north along Wiley Avenue
Canterbury-Bankstown	Punchbowl–Lakemba–Wiley Park tripoint	0.0	0.0	Punchbowl Road – Punchbowl, Strathfield South	
Canterbury-Bankstown	Wiley Park	0.6	0.37	Bankstown railway line	
Canterbury-Bankstown	Wiley Park–Roselands boundary	1.5	0.93	Canterbury Road (A34) – Liverpool, Punchbowl, Canterbury	
Canterbury-Bankstown–Georges River boundary	Beverly Hills	3.1	1.9	South Western Motorway (M5 west) – Liverpool, Canberra; M5 East Motorway (M5 east) – Sydney Airport, Sydney CBD; M8 Motorway – Sydney Airport, Kingsford, Randwick	
Georges River	Beverly Hills	3.8	2.4	East Hills railway line	
Georges River	Beverly Hills	4.3	2.7	Stoney Creek Road – Peakhurst, Bexley	
Georges River	Penshurst–Hurstville boundary	5.8	3.6	Forest Road – Lugarno, Arncliffe	
Georges River	Penshurst–Hurstville boundary	6.0	3.7	South Coast railway line	
Georges River	Blakehurst	9.0	5.6	Stuart Street – Blakehurst	
Georges River	Blakehurst	9.0	5.6	Princes Highway (A1) – Newtown, Heathcote, Wollongong	Southern terminus of road and route A3
Tolled; Route transition
