= Pittwater Road =

Road on the Northern Beaches of Sydney, Australia

Pittwater Road New South Wales
- Coordinates: 33.644809°S 151.284351°E (North end); 33.795521°S 151.285202°E (South end)

General information
- Type: Road
- Length: 20.9 km (13 mi)
- Gazetted: August 1928
- Route number(s): A8 (2013–present) (Mona Vale–North Manly)
- Former route number: Metroad 10 (1998–2013); State Route 14 (1974–1998) (Mona Vale–North Manly); State Route 12 (1974–1995) (North Manly–Manly)

Major junctions
- North end: McCarrs Creek Road; Church Point, Sydney
- Barrenjoey Road; Mona Vale Road; Wakehurst Parkway; Warringah Road; Condamine Street
- South end: Belgrave Street; North Manly, Sydney

Location(s)
- Major suburbs: Bayview, Mona Vale, Narrabeen, Dee Why, Brookvale, North Manly

Pittwater Road is a 21-kilometre-long (13 mi) major arterial road along the coast of the Northern Beaches suburbs of Sydney, Australia, the majority of which is a constituent part of the A8 route.

== Route ==
Pittwater Road commences at the intersection with McCarrs Creek Road at Church Point and heads in a southerly direction as a two-lane, single-carriageway road through Bayview, intersecting with Barrenjoey Road in Mona Vale, where it widens to a four-lane, dual-carriageway road, and meets Mona Vale Road shortly afterwards (with additional bus lanes in both directions). It continues in a southerly direction through Narrabeen and Dee Why, where it intersects with Condamine Street in North Manly and heads closer to the coast, varying between a four- and six-lane dual-carriageway until it crosses Manly Creek, where it narrows to a four-lane, single-carriageway road. It eventually terminates at the intersection with Belgrave and Raglan Streets, in Manly, outside the Manly Oval.

Most of Pittwater Road is a concrete slab road laid in the 1930s.

=== Pittwater Road, City of Ryde ===
A separate Pittwater Road is a local arterial in the northern suburbs west of the Lane Cove River in the City of Ryde local government area. This section of the road begins in the south at the junction with Victoria Road in Gladesville, and proceeds through East Ryde and North Ryde until it joins Epping Road, and the road name ends a short distance to the north in Macquarie Park. The two Pittwater Roads are connected between Gordon and Mona Vale by the A3 arterial road, which is formed by Lane Cove Road and Mona Vale Road in this section. In former times, much of present-day Mona Vale Road through St. Ives, Terrey Hills and Ingleside, was known by varying names, including "Pittwater Road".

== History ==
The passing of the Main Roads Act of 1924 through the Parliament of New South Wales provided for the declaration of Main Roads, roads partially funded by the State government through the Main Roads Board (later Transport for NSW). Main Road No. 159 was declared from the intersection with Condamine Street in North Manly to the intersection with Belgrave Street in Manly (then continuing south along Belgrave Street then west via Sydney Road to Balgowah), Main Road No. 164 was declared from the intersection with Condamine Street in North Manly, via Dee Why and Narrabeen to Mona Vale (and continuing north via Barrenjoey Road to Newport), and Main Road No. 174 was declared from Mona Vale, via Bayview to Church Point, on the same day, 8 August 1928; with the passing of the Main Roads (Amendment) Act of 1929 to provide for additional declarations of State Highways and Trunk Roads, these was amended to Main Roads 159 and 164 and 174 on 8 April 1929.

The full length of the route, between Church Point and Raglan Street in Manly, was officially named Pittwater Road on 10 January 1951. The eastern end of Main Road 174 was truncated to the intersection of McCarrs Creek Road and the entrance to Ku-ring-gai Chase National Park near Church Point, and the section between there along Pittwater Road to Mona Vale was replaced by Secondary Road 2110, on 12 March 2010.

The passing of the Roads Act of 1993 updated road classifications and the way they could be declared within New South Wales. Under this act, Pittwater Road retains its declaration as parts of Main Roads 159 and 164, and Secondary Road 2110.

The route was allocated State Route 14 in 1974 between Mona Vale and North Manly, and State Route 12 between Manly and Queenscliff, in 1974 (where it diverted via Oliver Street via Curl Curl to meet Pittwater Road in Dee Why), in 1974. State Route 12 was realigned to follow Pittwater Road through to the intersection with Condamine Street in North Manly in 1993, but was decommissioned entirely in 1995. State Route 14 was later replaced by Metroad 10 in 1998. With the conversion to the newer alphanumeric system in 2013, Metroad 10 was replaced by route A8.

== Major intersections ==
Pittwater Road is entirely contained within the Northern Beaches Council local government area.

Location	km	mi	Destinations	Notes
Church Point	0.0	0.0	McCarrs Creek Road – Terrey Hills, Ku-ring-gai Chase National Park	Northern terminus of road, continues as McCarrs Creek Road
Mona Vale	4.7	2.9	Barrenjoey Road – Newport, Palm Beach	
Mona Vale	4.9	3.0	Mona Vale Road (A3) – Terrey Hills, Ryde, Blakehurst	Northern terminus of route A8
North Narrabeen	8.5	5.3	Wakehurst Parkway – Frenchs Forest, Seaforth	
Dee Why	15.3	9.5	Warringah Road (A38 west) – Frenchs Forest, Chatswood, North Ryde; Harbord Road (south) – Freshwater	
Brookvale–North Manly boundary	17.1	10.6	Condamine Street (A8) – Mosman, North Sydney	Route A8 continues southwest along Condamine Street
North Manly	19.0	11.8	Oliver Street – Queenscliff, Curl Curl	
Manly	19.6	12.2	Balgowlah Street – Balgowlah	Roundabout
Manly	20.9	13.0	Raglan Street – Manly, Fairlight	
Manly	20.9	13.0	Belgrave Street – Manly	Southern terminus of road, continues south as Belgrave Street
Route transition
