= West Pymble =

- Suburb
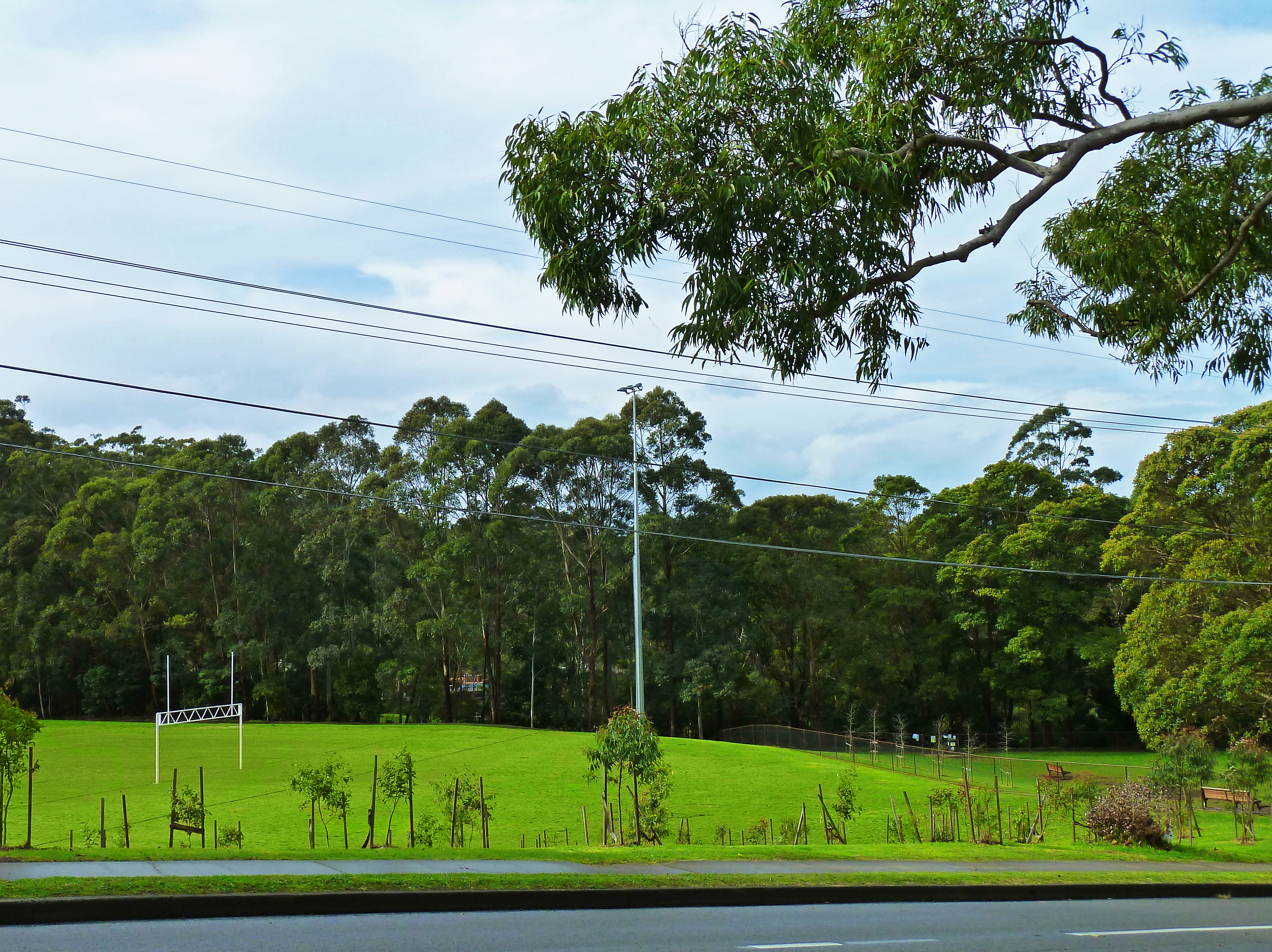
- Bicentennial Park, Yanko Road

- Interactive map of West Pymble
- Country: Australia
- State: New South Wales
- City: Sydney
- LGA: Ku-ring-gai Council
- Location: 18 km (11 mi) north-west of Sydney CBD

Government
  - State electorate: Wahroonga
  - Federal division: Bradfield

Area
  - Total: 3.70 km^{2} (1.43 sq mi)
- Elevation: 85 m (279 ft)

Population
  - Total: 5,441 (SAL 2021)
  - Density: 1,489/km^{2} (3,860/sq mi)
- Postcode: 2073
Suburbs around West Pymble
| South Turramurra | Turramurra | Pymble |
| Marsfield | West Pymble | Gordon |
| Macquarie Park | Macquarie Park | Killara |

West Pymble is a suburb on the Upper North Shore of Sydney in the state of New South Wales, Australia 15 kilometres (9.3 mi) north-west of the Sydney Central Business District in the local government area of Ku-ring-gai Council. Pymble is a separate suburb to the east, sharing the postcode of 2073.

== History ==
The land on which West Pymble was built was Guringai country, until European arrival brought disease which greatly reduced the population. By 1824, Aboriginal people in the area had been reduced to 'the remains of an Aboriginal tribe', who periodically walked through the area on their way from Bobbin Head to Pymble Hill. Early European settler Robert Pymble told his grandchildren that the Aboriginal people had gone by 1856.

Logging was the first industry of the area, with both government logging camps and private contractors felling the biggest trees and dragging them to the Lane Cove River or local sawpits. The Lofberg family, who were established in the area by the 1860s, shipped lumber to the Sydney markets on their boats, and raised nine children on their farm in West Pymble.

The rugged country and sloping land of West Pymble was slower to be settled than surrounding flatter areas, and became a bush haven for absconded convicts, illicit stills, gambling and cockfighting.

As the timber was felled, land was used for orchards, and by the 1880s growing citrus, apples, pears and stone fruit was a major industry. The Lofberg, Kendall and Munday families grew fruit and raised pigs on their mixed farms. These enterprises survived into the 1920s, although the arrival of codling moth decreased fruit growing, and the construction of the North Shore railway line in the 1890s made the land more valuable as residential property. Pymble soon boasted Hamilton Bros Universal Providers, near the station and other businesses. The Lofbergs diversified into quarrying, with their sandstone quarry being taken over by the Ku-ring-gai Council in 1926, to provide materials for roads and footpaths in the municipality.

West Pymble was subdivided between 1900 and 1915, but was still sparsely populated because of its distance from the railway at Pymble. Much of the area remained semi-rural throughout the interwar period.

Much of the area was developed after the Second World War (mainly in the 1950s and 1960s) with defence personnel housing and homes for returning soldiers built in brand new streets pushed through the bush. West Pymble's war memorial hall was opened in 1959 on the Lofbergs' original landholding on Loftberg Road. The original housing style included three-bedroom weatherboard cottages. Many remain but a lot of them have been significantly extended and/or upgraded since; others have been demolished and replaced with larger homes.

West Gordon Public School opened in 1951, and later West Pymble Public School in 1960 to educate the children of the new residents, and the inhabitants of the Bernard Smith Children's home, run by the Central Methodist Mission from 1960 to 1988.

The section of West Pymble, on the eastern side of Ryde Road, including Kiparra Street, Dunoon Avenue, Wyuna Avenue and adjoining streets, was originally designated "West Gordon" and it was considered to be part of the suburb of Gordon. However, in 1990, the suburban boundaries were reviewed and this neighbourhood became re-designated as part of West Pymble instead, although the name of the public primary school did not change.

Pymble West Post Office opened on 1 December 1958 and closed in 1974.

== Commercial area ==
Ku-ring-gai

The Philip Mall, located on Kendall Street, is a street mall with two rows of shops facing each other.

Philip Mall was redeveloped in the 1990s. The development included the removal of gardens between two shops which had become largely dilapidated. Some of the gardens were replanted with the rest of the area paved, which significantly increased space in the mall. Seating and additional bicycle stands were installed. At the same time the large children's playground was upgraded with improved safety features and playsets.

In 1998 the Boonah Creative Arts Centre was established in the old community centre, operated by the Sisters of Mercy. The Boonah Centre provides fine arts education to mentally disabled persons.

In 2012, Philip Mall was re-landscaped, with the centre area between the shops being gutted, and a new layout built to give more space to allow shoppers to move between the 2 lines of shops.

The Philip Mall shops association is the West Pymble Chamber of Commerce which organises many events of interest to and including the local community.

The Gordon West Shops are in Duneba Avenue, West Pymble. They include a dentist, hair salon, German and Italian restaurants. The Gordon West shops are a significantly smaller group than Philip Mall shops.

== Transport ==
The closest railway station is Pymble railway station located about 2.5 kilometres (1.6 mi) from the centre of West Pymble. However, it is difficult to access from West Pymble, and bus services such as CDC NSW's route 560 run from West Pymble to Gordon railway station in a loop service. CDC NSW also runs two bus services, route 575, from Macquarie University to Hornsby railway station via Pymble and Turramurra and also route 572 from Macquarie University to Turramurra railway station via South Turramurra and West Pymble, which route 575 previously operated prior to 2012. Route 197 runs along Ryde Road through West Pymble from Macquarie University to Gordon station, then onwards to Mona Vale via St Ives, Austlink and Terrey Hills.

Inner Suburb:

- 560 – Gordon Station
- 572 – Turramurra Station via South Turramurra Loop
  Macquarie Centre & University

Ryde Road

- 575 – Hornsby Station via Pymble, Turramurra, North Wahroonga, Hornsby Hospital
  Macquarie Centre & University
- 197 – Mona Vale via Gordon Station, St Ives Shops, Austlink & Terrey Hills
  Macquarie Centre & University via Macquarie Park Station

The Comenarra Parkway is an arterial road that runs from West Pymble (Yanko Road) to Thornleigh via South Turramurra and Wahroonga.

At the 2021 census, 2.2% of employed people travelled to work via public transport compared to the national average of 4.6%, and 28.8% by car (either as driver or as passenger) compared to the national average of 57.8%. These statistics may significantly differ as the 2021 Census was conducted throughout the Work From Home period in New South Wales, as at the 2021 Census 53.5% of respondents for this area worked from home compared to the national average at this time of 21.0%. As at the 2016 census 21.3% of people traveled to work via public transport compared to the national average of 11.5%; there were 66.2% of respondents for this area who drove to work either as a driver or passenger compared to the national average of 68.4%; 6.8% of people worked at home compared to the national average of 4.7%.

== Parks ==
West Pymble is surrounded by Lane Cove National Park and provides excellent bushwalking opportunities.

The Bicentennial Park oval complex in Lofberg Road consists of netball courts, soccer and cricket fields, a public swimming pool, a children's playground and barbecue facilities. The park was originally a quarry and later a bike track until it was regenerated in 1988 to coincide with the Australian Bicentenary.

Other parks in the area include:

- Frogmore Park, Wyomee Avenue
- Shoppers Rest
- Shoppers Glen
- Ramsay Avenue Park
- Claire Taylor Park

== Schools ==
- West Pymble Public School, Apollo Avenue, a government primary school
- Gordon West Public School (is actually in West Pymble), a government primary school
- Our Lady of Perpetual Succour Catholic Primary School, Kendall Street, a Catholic primary school
- West Pymble Pre-school, Lofberg Road, a private pre-school
- ABC Learning day care centre, Kendall Street

== Places of worship ==
- St Matthew's Anglican church, Eppleston Place
- Our Lady of Perpetual Succour Catholic Church, Kendall Street

== Sports and recreation ==
=== Community groups and organised activities ===
- West Pymble Cricket Club – Lofberg Oval
- West Pymble Scout Group – Bicentennial Park
- Rover Scouts – for young people aged 18–25 – groups at nearby Kissing Point & Turramurra
- Girl Guides – Bicentennial Park
- Dance classes – held in the old SES hall on Lofberg Road
- Netball training – Bicentennial Park
- West Pymble Football Club – Norman Griffiths Oval
- Boonah Creative Arts Centre – Philip Mall, Kendall Street
- Killara West Pymble Rugby Union Football Club – Lofberg Oval

=== Sporting facilities ===
- Rugby Oval, Cricket pitch, training nets and club house (Loftberg Oval), Lofberg Road
- Netball Courts with night lighting, Bicentennial Park
- Football oval and club house (Norman Griffiths Oval), Lofberg Road
- West Pymble Bowling and Sports club
- Swimming Pools – heated 25m and 50m, covered children's splash pool, Bicentennial Park
- Tennis Courts, Kendall Street

== Demographics ==
At the 2021 census, the suburb of West Pymble recorded a population of 5,441. Of these:

- 63.7% of families were couple families with children, a higher proportion than the national average of 43.7%; the median age of all people was 41 years, compared to the national median of 38 years. Children aged under 15 years made up 22.1% of the population (the national average was 18.2%) and people aged 65 years and over made up 15.5% of the population (the national average was 16.3%).
- 66.6% of people were born in Australia; the next most common countries of birth included China (excluding Special Administrative Regions and Taiwan) 5.0%, England 4.8%, Hong Kong (Special Administrative Region of China) 2.3%, India 1.8%, South Africa 1.7%. 77.5% of people only spoke English at home; the next most common languages spoken at home included Mandarin 6.6%, Cantonese 4.4%, Korean 1.8%, Spanish 0.9%, and Japanese 0.7%.
- The most common responses for religion included No Religion 36.9%, Catholic 22.6%, Anglican 18.1, and Uniting Church 3.2%; 3.3% of respondents for this area elected not to disclose their religion.
- The median household weekly income was $3,503, nearly double the national median of $1,746; individual's incomes were $1,107 compared to the national average of $805; the average family income for this area was $3,908 compared to the national average of $2,120. Real estate was correspondingly expensive; the median mortgage repayment was $3,467 compared to the national median of $1,863.
- Separate houses constituted the overwhelming majority (96.1%) of residences, the next most common house structures included Semi-detached, row or terrace house, townhouse etc. 2.3%, and flat or apartment 2.3%. The average household size was 3.2 people.

== Notable residents ==
- Mel Gibson was raised in West Pymble after his family moved to Australia.
- Actress Jacki Weaver spent her teen years in West Pymble.
- Rai Thistlethwayte of Thirsty Merc grew up in West Pymble.
- Shane Gould, an Olympic swimmer grew up in West Pymble.
- Johnny O'Keefe lived in West Pymble.
- Christine Jensen Burke lives in West Pymble.
- Peter Garrett attended Gordon West Public.
