= Main Roads Board =

Former New South Wales government agency

Agency overview
- Formed: 1 January 1925
- Dissolved: 22 March 1932
- Superseding Agency: Department of Main Roads
- Jurisdiction: New South Wales
- Headquarters: Sydney
- Minister responsible: Michael Bruxner, Minister for Transport
- Key document: Main Roads Act 1924

The Main Roads Board was an agency of the Government of New South Wales, responsible for planning, constructing and maintaining road infrastructure in New South Wales, Australia.

== History ==
The Main Roads Board (MRB) was founded on 1 January 1925 pursuant to the Main Roads Act 1924. It took over responsibility of the New South Wales road network from local councils. It also took over the council's loans from the New South Wales Treasury. At the time of its formation, it was responsible for 20,700 kilometres of roads.

The MRB ceased to exist on 22 March 1932 with its functions transferred to the Ways & Works Branch. It was succeeded by the Department of Main Roads in December 1932.

== Publication ==
From 1929, Main Roads was the MRB's inhouse journal that was published quarterly.
