= General Holmes Drive =

Road in Sydney, New South Wales, Australia

General Holmes Drive New South Wales
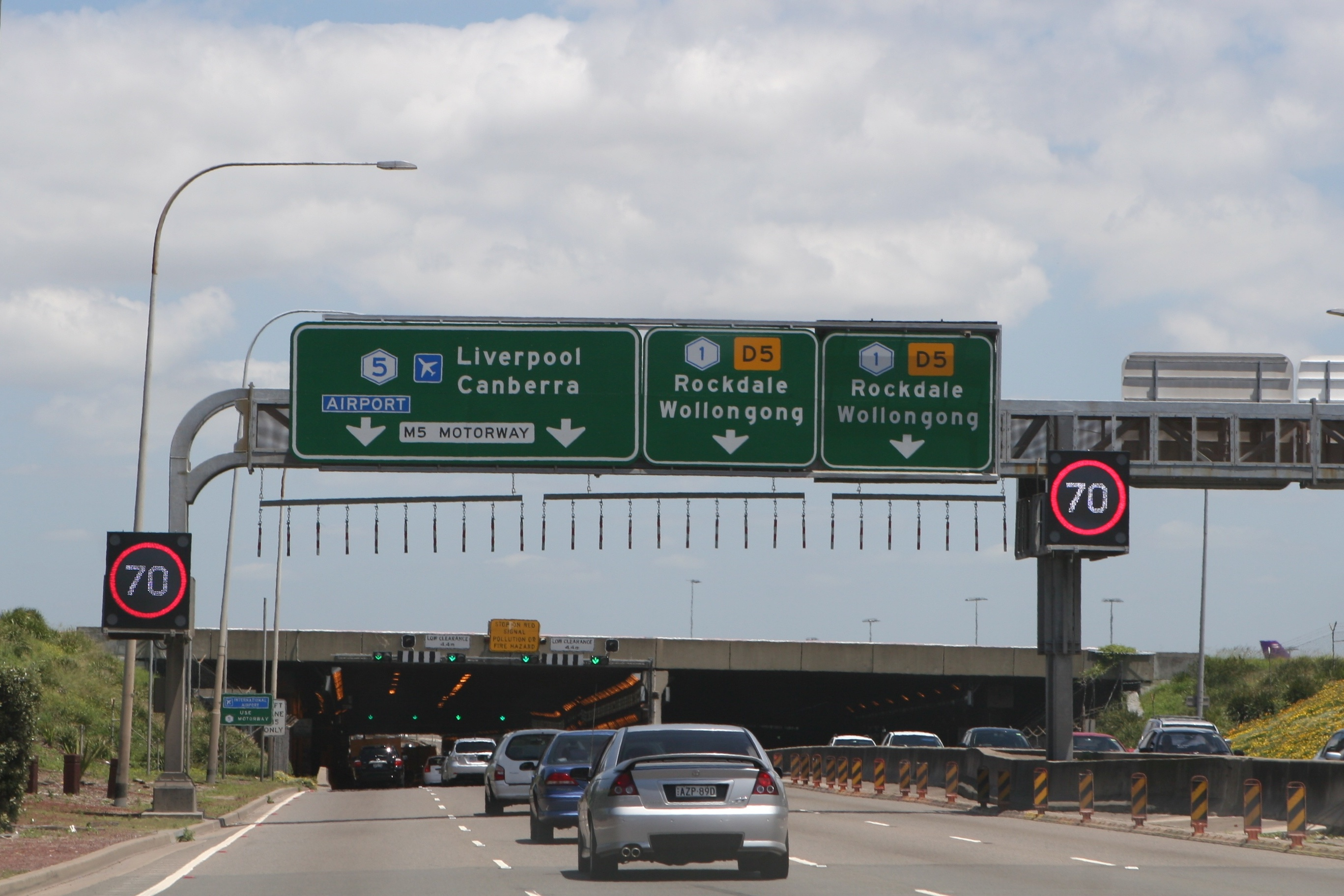
- General Holmes Drive, looking south-west from the Sydney Airport overpass
- Coordinates: 33.933851°S 151.192090°E (Northeast end); 33.958184°S 151.157768°E (Southwest end)

General information
- Type: Motorway
- Length: 5.0 km (3.1 mi)
- Gazetted: August 1928
- Route number(s): M1 (2013–present) (Botany–Kyeemagh); A1 (2013–present) (Kyeemagh–Brighton-Le-Sands)
- Former route number: Metroad 1 (1993–2013) (Botany–Brighton-Le-Sands); National Route 1 (1992–1993) (Botany–Brighton-Le-Sands); State Route 64 (1974–1992) (Botany–Brighton-Le-Sands)

Major junctions
- Northeast end: Joyce Drive; Mascot, Sydney
- Southern Cross Drive; East Motorway
- Southwest end: The Grand Parade; Brighton-Le-Sands, Sydney

Location(s)
- Major suburbs: Sydney Airport

Highway system
- Highways in Australia; National Highway • Freeways in Australia; Highways in New South Wales

General Holmes Drive is a 5-kilometre (3.1 mi) major divided road located in Sydney, New South Wales, Australia. The road forms part of the M1, the A1, the Sydney Orbital Network, and the Australian Highway 1 network. Initially built in 1919 as a two-lane road and duplicated in 1951, the road partially circumnavigates Sydney Airport with its north-eastern terminus in Mascot, heading west and then south and then south-west, with its south-western terminus with The Grand Parade in Brighton-Le-Sands.

The road forms major links with the Southern Cross Drive and the M5 East, both part of the Sydney Orbital Network.

The road is named in honour of William Holmes, a distinguished Australian general who died in action during World War I.

== Route ==
General Holmes Drive starts from Joyce Drive in Mascot, and heads south, reaching a major intersection with Wentworth Drive that carries all traffic exiting from the domestic terminals at Sydney Airport. Further west in Botany, the road meets the Mill Pond Road, a short road that connects with the Southern Cross Drive, carrying traffic north towards the Sydney central business district, with the south-westbound route providing access to both the international and the domestic terminals at Sydney Airport.

Via an interchange, General Holmes Drive heads south, forming a junction with Foreshore Drive that carries traffic to Port Botany and La Perouse. General Holmes Drive then heads through the Sydney Airport Tunnel, an eight-lane tidal flow culvert under the south-eastern runways of Sydney Airport. As the road exits the tunnel, there is a major exit to the M5. The road crosses over the Cooks River via the Endeavour Bridge, continues southeast into the suburbs of Kyeemagh and Brighton-Le-Sands, before terminating at the junction with The Grand Parade that carries traffic towards Sutherland and Wollongong.

Traffic runs in three lanes in both directions through Kyeemagh, becoming four lanes after the M5 East junction. The M5 East can only be accessed southbound, and traffic joins General Holmes Drive northbound.

Until July 2019, General Holmes Drive continued for a further 100 metres (330 ft) to the north-east to an intersection with Botany Road crossing the Metropolitan Goods railway line via a level crossing. This section closed when the level crossing was replaced by an underpass at Wentworth Avenue.

== History ==
The passing of the Main Roads Act of 1924 through the Parliament of New South Wales provided for the declaration of Main Roads, roads partially funded by the State government through the Main Roads Board (MRB). Main Road No. 194 was declared along this route on 8 August 1928, from the intersection of Botany and Lords Road in Mascot along Lords Road and Ascot Avenue, over the Cooks River Bridge, and General Holmes Drive to the intersection with The Grand Parade at Brighton-le-Sands (and continuing south along The Grand Parade and Ramsgate Road to the intersection with Princes Highway and Park Road in Kogarah Bay); with the passing of the Main Roads (Amendment) Act of 1929 to provide for additional declarations of State Highways and Trunk Roads, this was amended to Main Road 194 on 8 April 1929.

The Endeavour Bridge over Cooks River was opened in May 1951, replacing the former Cooks River Bridge. Lords Road and Ascot Avenue were officially re-named as part of General Holmes Drive between Cooks River and Mascot, extending the existing road south of Cooks River, on 19 December 1961.

The passing of the Roads Act of 1993 updated road classifications and the way they could be declared within New South Wales. Under this act, General Holmes Drive retains its declaration as part of Main Road 194.

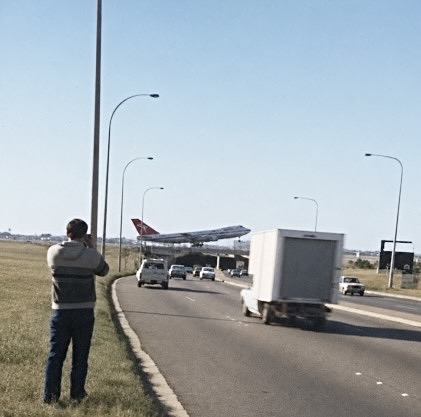
Qantas Boeing 747 taking off at General Holmes Drive, Sydney Mascot Airport during the 1970s.

The route was allocated part of State Route 64 in 1974, from Mill Pond Road in Mascot to The Grand Parade; its northern end was re-aligned through Mascot from Wentworth Avenue, Botany and Mill Pond Roads to Southern Cross Drive when its southern extension opened in 1988. It was replaced by National Route 1 from Southern Cross Drive to Brighton-Le-Sands when Sydney Harbour Tunnel opened in 1992, then by Metroad 1 in 1993. With the conversion to the newer alphanumeric system in 2013, it was replaced with route M1 between Southern Cross Road and M5 East Motorway, and route A1 from there to The Grand Parade.

== Exits and interchanges ==
General Holmes Drive is entirely contained within the Bayside Council local government area.

Location	km	mi	Destinations	Notes
Mascot	0.0	0.0	Joyce Drive – Mascot, Sydney Airport	Northeastern terminus of road
Mascot	0.0	0.0	Ross Smith Avenue – Sydney Airport	
Mascot	0.25	0.16	Wentworth Avenue – Eastlakes, Eastgardens, Sydney CBD	
Mascot	0.5	0.31	Mill Pond Road – Botany, Maroubra, Sydney CBD	
Mascot–Botany boundary	1.0	0.62	Southern Cross Drive (M1) – Randwick, Sydney CBD	Northbound exit and southbound entrance at partial Y interchange; Route transition: no route number north, M1 continues south from Southern Cross Drive
Mascot–Botany boundary	1.5	0.93	Foreshore Road – Port Botany, La Perouse	
Mascot	2.2– 2.8	1.4– 1.7	Sydney Airport Tunnel	
Mascot	2.9	1.8	East Motorway (M5) – Liverpool, Canberra	Westbound exit and eastbound entrance at partial Y interchange Route transition: M1 eastbound, A1 south-westbound
Cooks River	3.2	2.0	Endeavour Bridge	
Kyeemagh	4.1	2.5	Bestic Street – Rockdale	
Brighton-Le-Sands	4.9	3.0	Bruce Street – Brighton-Le-Sands	
Brighton-Le-Sands	4.9	3.0	The Grand Parade (A1) – Wollongong, Nowra	Southwestern terminus of road, route A1 continues south along The Grand Parade
Tolled; Route transition

== See also ==
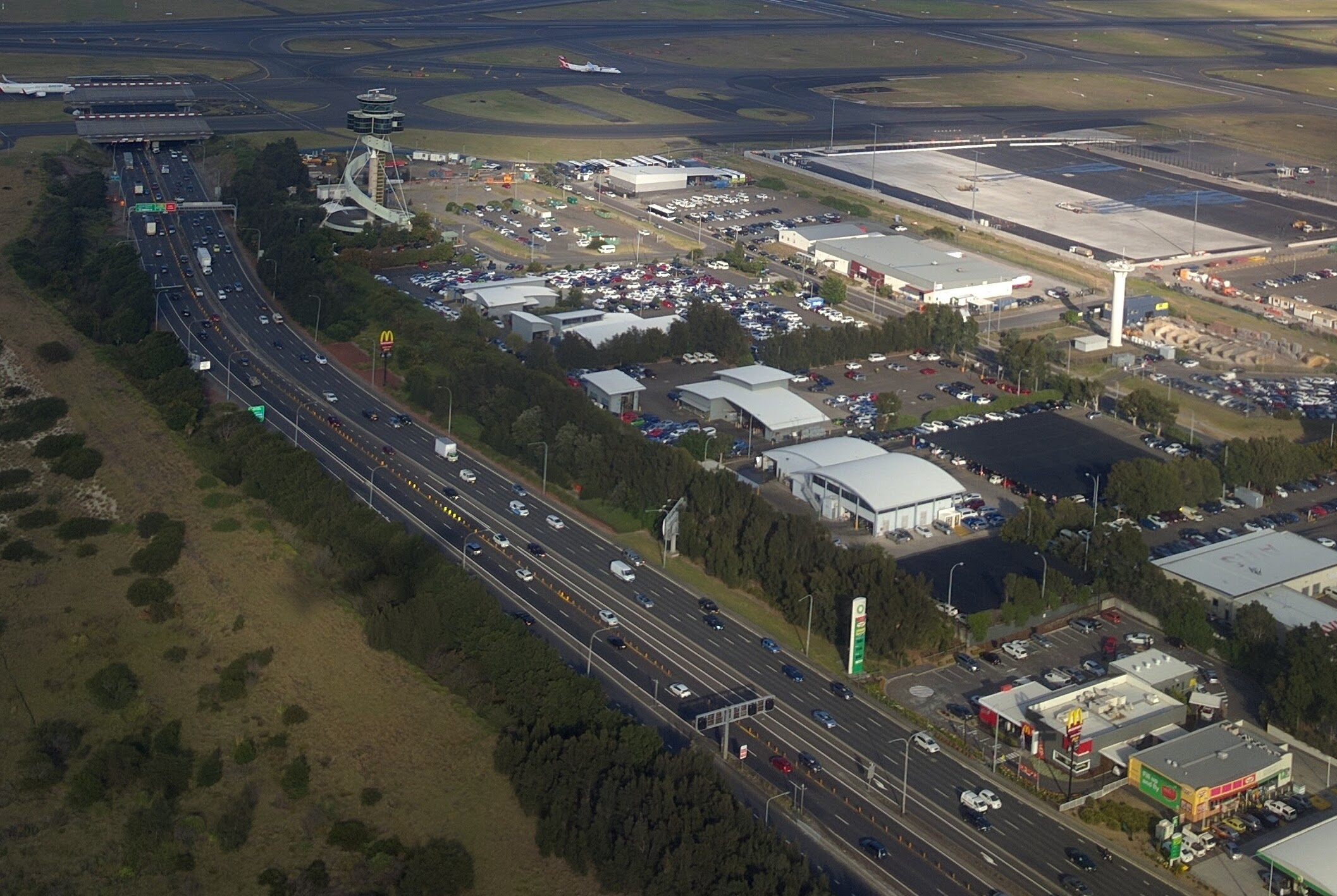
An aerial view of General Holmes Drives, looking west, in 2015

- Freeways in Australia
- Freeways in Sydney
