= Southern Cross Drive =

Road in Sydney, Australia

Southern Cross Drive New South Wales
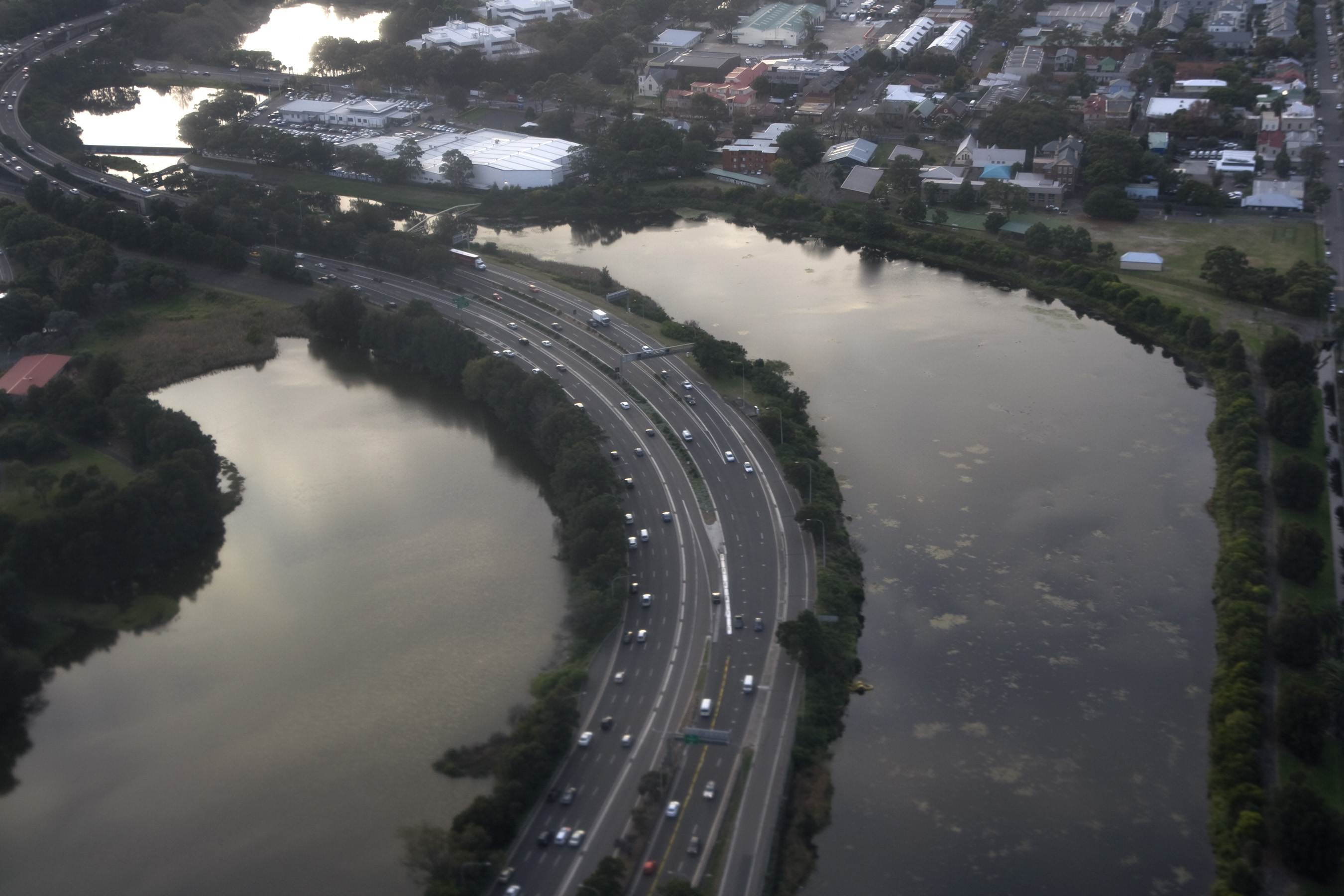
- Aerial view of Southern Cross Drive in 2012, with Botany Lakes and Mill Steam astride the road
- Coordinates: 33.909925°S 151.213054°E (North end); 33.941048°S 151.192669°E (South end)

General information
- Type: Motorway
- Length: 4.9 km (3.0 mi)
- Gazetted: January 1993
- Route number(s): M1 (2013–present)
- Former route number: Metroad 1 (1993–2013); National Route 1 (1992–1993); State Route 64 (1974–1992)

Major junctions
- North end: South Dowling Street; Kensington, Sydney
- Wentworth Avenue; Mill Pond Road
- South end: General Holmes Drive; Mascot, Sydney

Location(s)
- Major suburbs / towns: Eastlakes, Pagewood, Rosebery

Highway system
- Highways in Australia; National Highway • Freeways in Australia; Highways in New South Wales

Southern Cross Drive is a 4.8 km (3 mi) dual carriage untolled motorway in Sydney, New South Wales, Australia. Part of the M1 and Sydney Orbital Network, the road, a freeway that opened in 1969, links South Dowling Street (and Eastern Distributor just beyond) at Kensington in the north to General Holmes Drive at Sydney Airport in the south.

== Route ==
Southern Cross Drive commences at the interchange with South Dowling Street (and the southern end of Eastern Distributor, around 500m beyond) and Link Road and heads south as a 6-lane, dual-carriageway road, tracing past the western border of The Australian Golf Club in Kensington and through The Lakes Golf Club in Eastlakes, before turning westwards over Wentworth Avenue towards the eastern boundary of Sydney Airport, where it turns south again to eventually merge with General Holmes Drive.

With the development of many other motorways and freeways, Southern Cross Drive is part of the 110-kilometre (68 mi) Sydney Orbital Network, providing links without interruption between Greater Western Sydney, Eastern Suburbs, the North Shore and Hills District. It allows a continuous link from M5 Motorway, General Holmes Drive, Westlink M7, Eastern Distributor, Cahill Expressway, Sydney Harbour Tunnel, Sydney Harbour Bridge, Warringah Freeway, Gore Hill Freeway, Lane Cove Tunnel and M2 Hills Motorway.

In August 2013, the Southern Cross Drive carried about 20,000 vehicles per day, both north and southbound.

South of Wentworth Avenue and north of Botany Road, Southern Cross Drive is elevated above the Port Botany railway line.

== History ==
Southern Cross Drive was originally built to provide access to the Sydney central business district for suburbs in Southern Sydney and South Eastern Sydney, and originally terminated at Wentworth Avenue at Pagewood. The Gardeners Road bridge was completed in 1969, elevated above Southern Cross Drive at Eastlakes.

A road project to extend Southern Cross Drive further south-west as an elevated roadway over Wentworth Avenue, Botany and Mill Pond Roads – and over reclaimed swampland including Mill Pond, Mill Steam, and Botany Dams, much of which has been reclaimed for golf courses (including the Eastlakes Golf Club, The Lakes Golf Club and Bonnie Doon Golf Club) – to connect directly to General Holmes Drive on the eastern border of Sydney Airport, opened in February 1988.

The passing of the Main Roads Act of 1924 through the Parliament of New South Wales provided for the declaration of Main Roads, roads partially funded by the State government through the Main Roads Board (MRB). With the subsequent passing of the Main Roads (Amendment) Act of 1929 to provide for additional declarations of State Highways and Trunk Roads, the Department of Main Roads (having succeeded the MRB in 1932) extended the southern end of Main Road 593 from its old terminus on South Dowling Street at the intersection with O'Dea and Todman Avenues further along South Dowling Street and along the entire length of Southern Cross Drive on 22 January 1993. Despite its role as a grade-separated expressway, the road is not officially gazetted as one by Transport for NSW classification, and is still considered today to be a main road.

The passing of the Roads Act of 1993 updated road classifications and the way they could be declared within New South Wales. Under this act, Southern Cross Drive retains its declaration as part of Main Road 593.

The route was allocated State Route 64 in 1974; when the Southern Cross Drive extension opened in 1988, it was extended along with it. It was replaced by National Route 1 when the Sydney Harbour Tunnel opened in 1992, then by Metroad 1 in 1993. With the conversion to the newer alphanumeric system in 2013, Metroad 1 was replaced by route M1.

There were plans to construct south-facing ramps from Gardeners Road to Southern Cross Drive, proposed in 2005.

== Exits and interchanges ==
LGA	Location	km	mi	Destinations	Notes
Sydney–Randwick boundary	Zetland–Kensington boundary	0.0	0.0	South Dowling Street (M1) – Surry Hills, Darlinghurst, Paddington to Eastern Distributor (M1) – Woolloomooloo, Sydney CBD, North Sydney	Northern terminus of road, route M1 continues north along South Dowling Street
Sydney–Randwick boundary	Zetland–Kensington boundary	0.0	0.0	Link Road – Rosebery	Northbound entrance and exit only
Bayside	Eastlakes–Mascot–Pagewood tripoint	3.2	2.0	Wentworth Avenue – Maroubra, Mascot	Northbound entrance and southbound exit only
Bayside	Mascot–Pagewood–Botany tripoint	4.4	2.7	Southern Sydney Freight Line	
Bayside	Mascot	4.5	2.8	Mill Pond Road, to General Holmes Drive (north) – Port Botany, La Perouse, Sydney Airport; Botany Road – Botany, Mascot, Arncliffe	Northbound entrance and southbound exit only
Bayside	Botany–Mascot boundary	4.9	3.0	General Holmes Drive (M1 south) – Blakehurst, Heathcote, Wollongong	Southern terminus of road, route M1 continues southeast along General Holmes Drive
1.000 mi = 1.609 km; 1.000 km = 0.621 mi: Incomplete access; Route transition

== Gallery ==
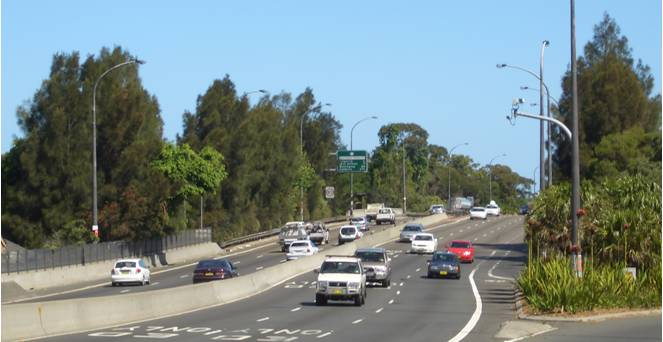
Southern Cross Drive, southerly direction, at the Link Road entrance. Also visible are lane markings notifying motorists of the approaching entrance to Eastern Distributor

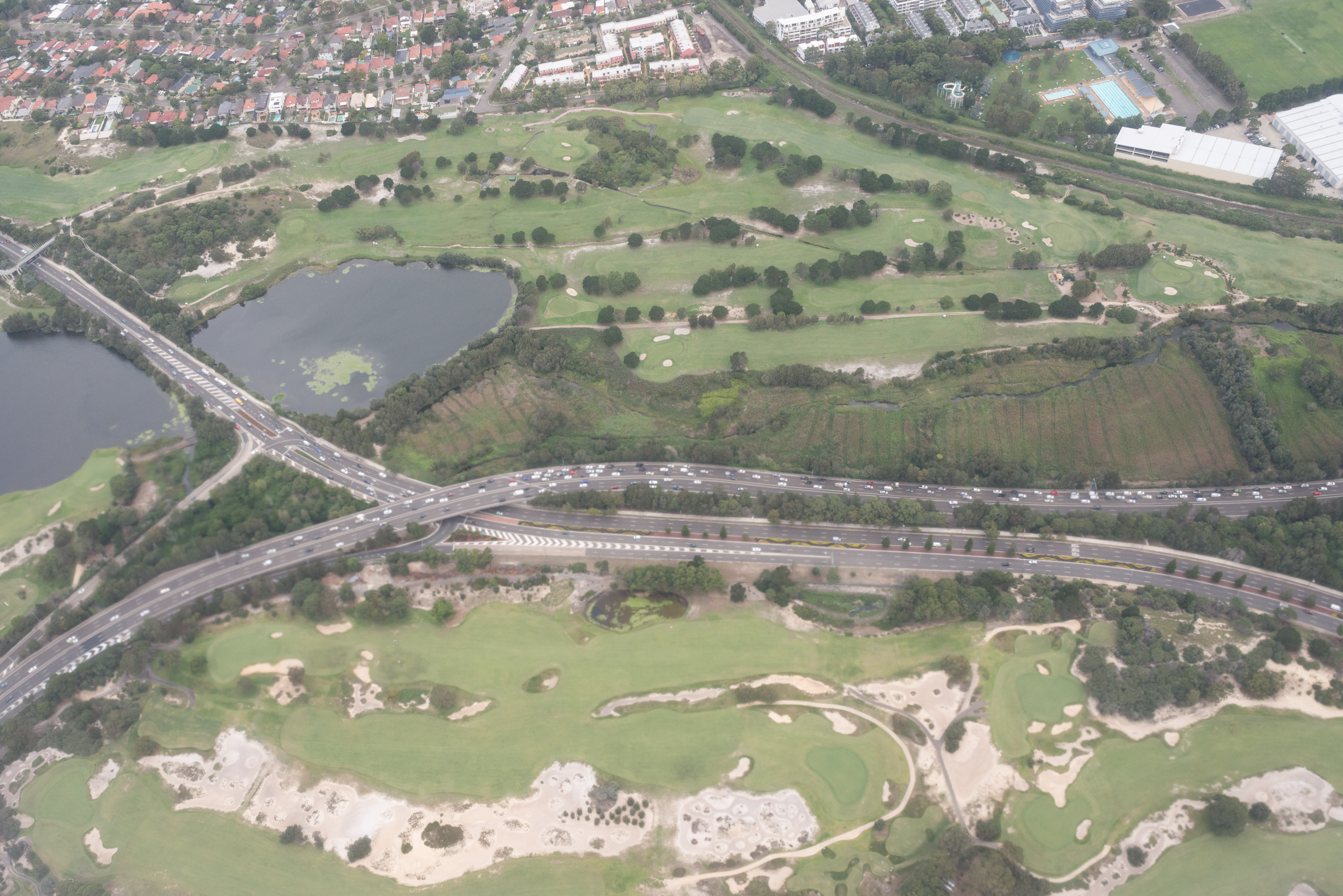
Crossing over Wentworth Avenue with surrounding golf courses.

== See also ==
- Freeways in Sydney
- Southern Cross (aircraft)
