= Highway 1 (New South Wales) =

Road route in New South Wales, Australia

Highway 1 New South Wales
- Map of New South Wales with Highway 1 highlighted in red

General information
- Type: Highway
- Length: 1,351 km (839 mi)
- Opened: 1955
- Route number(s): M1; (Tweed Heads–West Ballina); A1; (West Ballina–Newcastle); M1; (Newcastle–Wahroonga); A1; (Wahroonga–Artarmon); M1; (Artarmon–Mascot); A1; (Mascot–Waterfall); M1; (Waterfall–Kiama); A1; (Kiama–Timbillica)

Major junctions
- North end: NSW/QLD border near Tweed Heads, New South Wales
- Bruxner Highway; Gwydir Highway; Oxley Highway; New England Highway; Hunter Expressway; Newcastle Link Road; Central Coast Highway; Mona Vale Road/Ryde Road (A3); Military Road (A8); Bradfield Highway (A4); M5 East Freeway (M5); King Georges Road (A3); Heathcote Road (A6); Illawarra Highway (A48); Kings Highway; Snowy Mountains Highway
- South end: NSW/VIC border near Timbillica, New South Wales

Location(s)
- Major settlements: Ballina, Coffs Harbour, Port Macquarie, Taree, Newcastle, Sydney, Wollongong, Batemans Bay, Bega

Highway system
- Highways in Australia; National Highway • Freeways in Australia; Highways in New South Wales

In New South Wales, Highway 1 is a 1,351-kilometre (839 mi) long route that crosses the state, from the Queensland/New South Wales border near Tweed Heads to the Victorian border near Timbillica. It provides the main coastal route between Brisbane and Melbourne via Sydney. Highway 1 continues around the rest of Australia, joining all mainland state capitals, and connecting major centres in Tasmania.

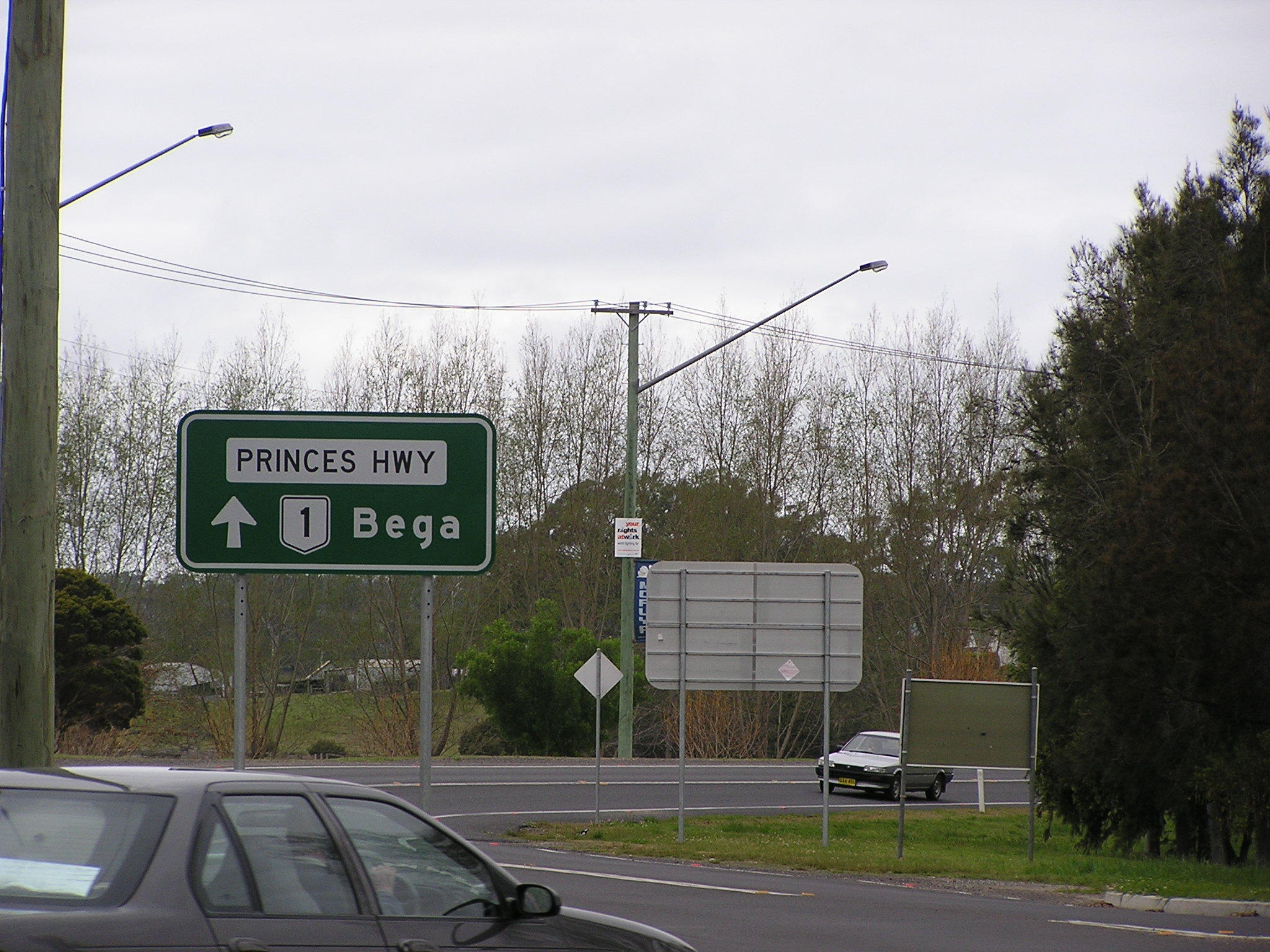
Route 1 sign for Princes Highway at Moruya

Highway 1 is often associated with summer road excursions for people of New South Wales since the whole route passes very near to the ocean. Parts of the route are also busy intercity or commuter routes.

While the route is defined by its designation of "1", with today's alphanumeric route numbering system the route consists of eight sections, alternating between the M1 designation (for motorway grade sections) and the A1 designation (for other sections).

== History ==
Highway 1 was created as part of the National Route Numbering system, adopted in 1955. The route was compiled from an existing network of state and local roads and tracks.

=== Route numbering ===
When Highway 1 was declared in 1955, the entire route carried the National Route 1 shield. In 1974, the Sydney-Newcastle Freeway section was declared part of the National Highway, and the route marker was subsequently updated to National Highway 1 for this section

In 1993, the route numbering was further complicated with the introduction of the Metroad numbering system within the Sydney metro area. The section of highway 1 between Wahroonga and Waterfall was proclaimed Metroad 1.

In 2013, alphanumeric route numbering was introduced to New South Wales, and all sections of Highway 1 were changed to carry either the M1 or A1 designation, depending on the grade of the road. As of 2013, large sections of the Pacific Highway are actually of motorway standard, despite still carrying the A1 designation. The government has explained this is to avoid frequent changes in route designation, with plans to update the designation to M1 over time as large sections of road are brought to motorway standard.

== Route description ==
Highway 1 travels multiple named roads on its journey from the Queensland to the Victorian border:

- Pacific Motorway (Brisbane to Brunswick Heads)
- / Pacific Highway (Brunswick Heads to Heatherbrae)
- Pacific Motorway (Heatherbrae to Wahroonga)
- Pacific Highway (Wahroonga to Artarmon)
- Gore Hill Freeway (Artarmon to Naremburn)
- Warringah Freeway (Naremburn to North Sydney)
- Sydney Harbour Tunnel (North Sydney to Sydney)
- Cahill Expressway (Sydney to Woolloomooloo)
- Eastern Distributor (Woolloomooloo to Kensington)
- Southern Cross Drive (Kensington to Mascot)
- General Holmes Drive (Mascot to Kyeemagh)
- General Holmes Drive (Kyeemagh to Brighton-Le-Sands)
- The Grand Parade (Brighton-Le-Sands to Brighton-Le-Sands)
- President Avenue (Brighton-Le-Sands to Kogarah)
- Princes Highway (Kogarah to Sutherland)
- Acacia Road (Sutherland to Sutherland)
- Princes Highway (Sutherland to Waterfall)
- Princes Motorway (Waterfall to Oak Flats)
- Princes Highway (Oak Flats to Kiama)
- Princes Highway (Kiama to Timbillica)

== Major intersections ==
Highway 1 intersects the following major roads in New South Wales (North to South):

- Bruxner Highway
- Big River Way
- Oxley Highway
- New England Highway
- Hunter Expressway
- Newcastle Link Road
- Central Coast Highway
- Mona Vale Road/Ryde Road (A3)
- Military Road (A8)
- Bradfield Highway (A4)
- M5 East Freeway (M5)
- King Georges Road (A3)
- Heathcote Road (A6)
- Illawarra Highway (A48)
- Kings Highway
- Snowy Mountains Highway

== See also ==
- Highway 1 (Northern Territory)
- Highway 1 (Queensland)
- Highway 1 (South Australia)
- Highway 1 (Tasmania)
- Highway 1 (Victoria)
- Highway 1 (Western Australia)
