= Eastern Distributor =

Motorway in Sydney, New South Wales, Australia

Eastern Distributor New South Wales

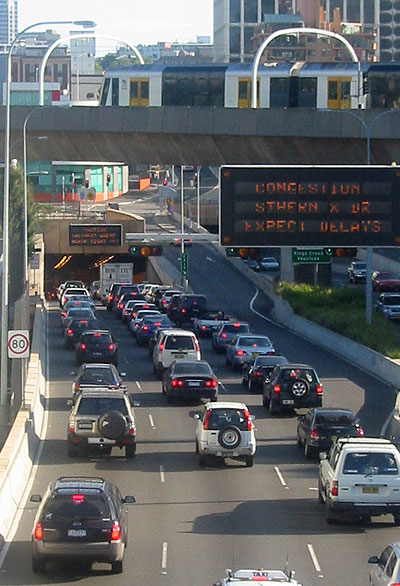
- Tunnel entrance at Woolloomooloo
- Coordinates: 33.868791°S 151.218460°E (North end); 33.910362°S 151.213003°E (South end)

General information
- Type: Motorway
- Length: 4.7 km (2.9 mi)
- Opened: December 1999
- Gazetted: July 1997
- Route number(s): M1 (2013–present)
- Former route number: Metroad 1 (1999–2013)

Major junctions
- North end: Cahill Expressway; Woolloomooloo, Sydney
- William Street; Anzac Parade; Cross City Tunnel
- South end: Southern Cross Drive; Kensington, Sydney

Highway system
- Highways in Australia; National Highway • Freeways in Australia; Highways in New South Wales

The Eastern Distributor is a 4.7-kilometre-long (2.9 mi) motorway in Sydney, New South Wales, Australia. Part of the M1 and the Sydney Orbital Network, the motorway links the Sydney central business district with the south-east and Sydney Airport. The Eastern Distributor separates Sydney's Eastern Suburbs from Sydney's Inner-Southern Suburbs. The centre-piece is a 1.7 km (1.1 mi) tunnel running from Woolloomooloo to Surry Hills. Built as a build-own-operate-transfer project, it is 75% owned by Transurban.

The motorway opened to traffic in December 1999, with the project fully completed in July 2000. It is only tolled in the northbound direction.

Transurban considers the southern end of Cahill Expressway (including the Domain Tunnel) to be part of the Eastern Distributor, and denotes the latter to have a total length of 6 kilometres (4 mi). The length of 4.7 kilometres (2.9 mi) used in this article refers to the length of the motorway constructed in the 1990s between the southern end of Cahill Expressway (Cowper Wharf Road) and the northern end of Southern Cross Drive (Link Road).

== Route ==
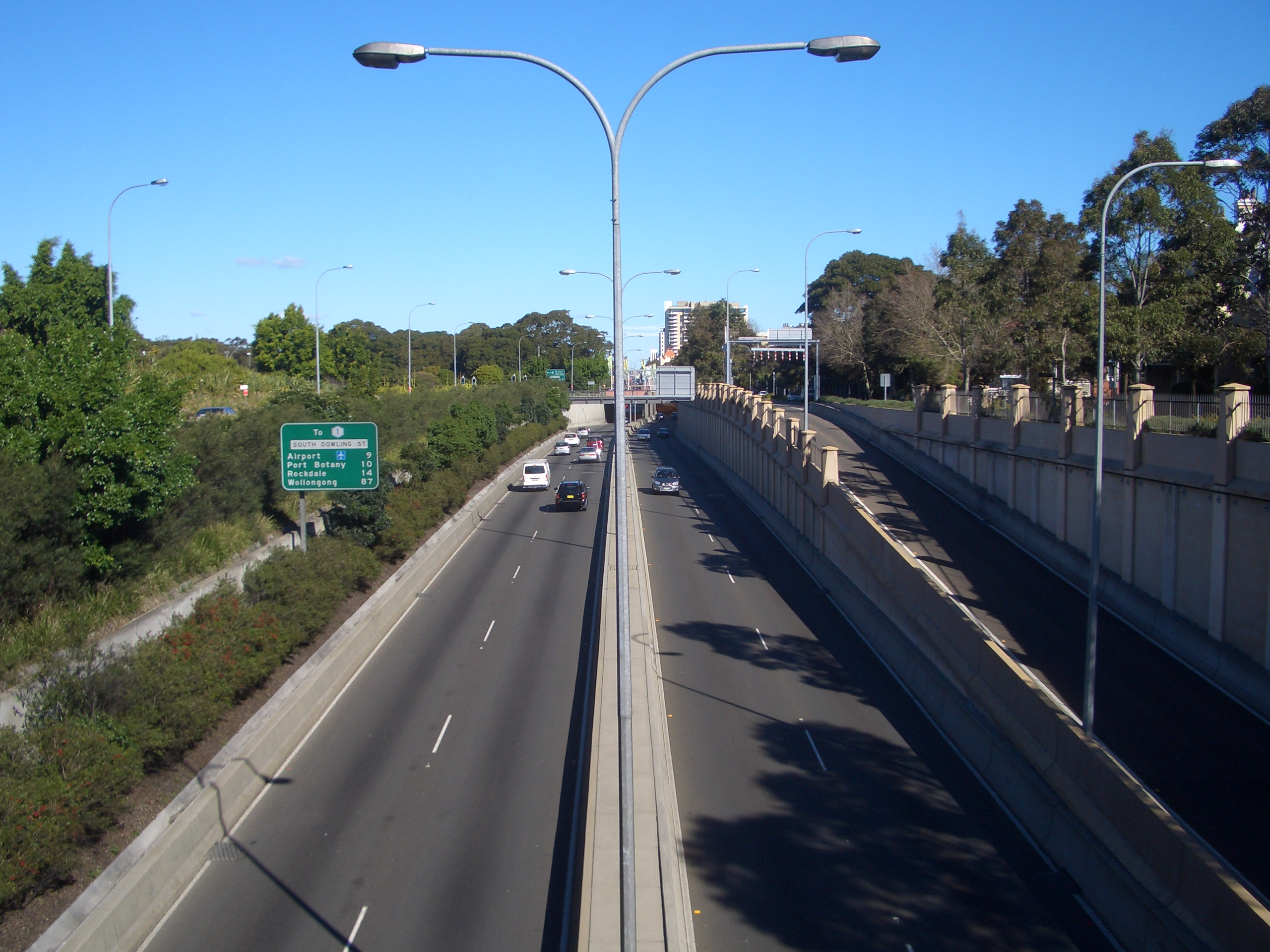
Eastern Distributor trench section within South Dowling Street at Moore Park, just after the main tunnel

The Eastern Distributor commences at the southern end of Cahill Expressway and the interchange with Cowper Wharf Road in Woolloomooloo and heads in a southerly direction as a dual-carriageway six-lane surface road, before entering piggyback tunnels shortly afterwards under the suburbs of Woolloomooloo and Darlinghurst, with a subterranean interchange with the Cross City Tunnel for direct connections to the Western Distributor. After returning to the surface in Moore Park, it continues south in a trench inside South Dowling Street, before ending at the interchange with Link Road and continuing south as Southern Cross Drive.

=== Design ===
The project's centrepiece is the 1.7-kilometre (1.1 mi) piggyback tunnel under one of Australia's most densely populated urban areas, necessitated due to the requirement of three lanes in each direction within the existing roadway corridor. The unique double-deck, three lanes per direction design comprises a large, single tunnel excavation. At mid-height through the excavation, a precast concrete ledge forms the base of the northbound tunnel, with the southbound tunnel slotting below. As a result, only one tunnel roof was created with the lower southbound carriageway built in a slot. According to the Australasian Tunnelling Society, no records are available of any piggyback tunnel (rail or road) where the upper carriageway has been carried on prestressed concrete planks resting on sidewall ledges. In the main tunnel there is a central length of 0.5 kilometres (0.3 mi) where the span is typically greater than 17 metres (56 ft), and of note, there is no record of any road tunnel with spans greater than this where permanent roof support comprises rockbolts and shotcrete only and with vertical unsupported sidewalls of rock.

At the time it was built, the tunnel's claim to fame was that at 24.5 metres (80 ft) across at its widest point, it was the widest tunnel in the world. This point occurs where the William Street on ramp tunnel merges with the main tunnel. At 14 metres (46 ft), the tunnel is also notably tall (from the ceiling to the floor).

The tunnels of the Eastern Distributor are fully equipped with lighting, ventilation, drainage, CCTV surveillance, fire fighting and emergency control systems.

== History ==
=== County of Cumberland planning scheme ===
The need for an Eastern Distributor was first discussed in the early 1950s in the County of Cumberland planning scheme.

Underpasses of the Eastern Distributor beneath William Street and Taylor Street were proposed to commence construction in 1974. The construction never eventuated.

=== 1984 scheme ===
In 1984, the Department of Main Roads proposed construction of the Eastern Distributor as a surface freeway with underpasses at William Street and Oxford Street. It was later redesigned into a tunnel from north of William Street to the intersections of South Dowling Street, Moore Park Road and Anzac Parade. An Environmental Impact Statement (EIS) was prepared on 1985 to be built in three stages:

- Stage 1: A southbound tunnel underpass under William Street (William Street underpass) and a roundabout at the Riley Street / Sir John Young Crescent intersection, scheduled for completion in 1988
- Stage 2: Southbound tunnel for the full length and a reconfigured Cahill Expressway intersection with Sir John Young Crescent. Bourke Street and Palmer Street including the William Street underpass would also be reversed for northbound travel. Stage 2 was scheduled for completion in 1990
- Stage 3: Northbound tunnel from Flinders Street connecting directly to the William Street underpass, scheduled for completion in 1992

The William Street underpass (Stage 1) opened in November 1987 and connected Cahill Expressway and Palmer Street to Bourke Street. The underpass allowed southbound traffic from Cahill Expressway to avoid intersecting William Street. The rest of the 1984 scheme was abandoned and not constructed due to escalating costs. The William Street underpass would eventually be closed twelve years later after the main Eastern Distributor tunnels opened to traffic in December 1999, to be reconstructed to form part of the Bourke Street on-ramp which opened seven months later.

Since initial plans for the distributor were declared and the initial land acquisition commenced, the corridor had "gone through "managed" social and environmental deterioration". This occurred "through the demolition and derelection of the housing stock and associated open space areas".

=== 1994 scheme ===
The completion of the Sydney Harbour Tunnel in 1992 resulted in an increase in volumes on Cahill Expressway and therefore an increased need for an inner-city bypass south and south-east of the expressway. Roads & Traffic Authority (RTA) undertook community consultation to gauge the level of community acceptance of construction of the Eastern Distributor as a toll road. With indications of a high level of community support, the Eastern Distributor project was revived by the New South Wales state government in 1994, based on the 1984 scheme. The Eastern Distributor would link the Sydney central business district with Sydney Airport via the already existing Southern Cross Drive (freeway), which would be widened. It was designed to ease congestion and to reduce the time to travel from the city to the airport by bypassing 19 traffic lights. A study commissioned by the State Chamber of Commerce in 1997 found that the "Eastern Distributor would prevent 330 accidents a year and cut fuel consumption by 1.2 million litres annually".

==== Tender process ====
In May 1994, the state government gave approval for RTA to invite the private sector to tender to construct and operate the tollway under a build-own-operate-transfer arrangement. In February and March 1995, three proponents were invited to develop detailed proposals. The RTA later requested the proponents to submit revised offers based on a concession term of 38 years, as "a term of 45 years would be unacceptable to the community" and the 38 year term had already been set as a precedent by the M2 Motorway.

The Labor state opposition promised that if elected, the Eastern Distributor would be toll-free. When Labor was elected as government in March 1995, the formal tender process had already commenced, and the new government had to proceed with constructing the Eastern Distributor as a tollway. In November 1995, the government agreed with RTA's recommendation to appoint Airport Motorway Limited (AML) as the successful proponent, with the government providing planning, support and management during construction. The other two unsuccessful proponents were Baulderstone Hornibrook and Transfield.

The Keating federal government announced on 15 December 1995 that it intended to withdraw taxation concessions on infrastructure bonds for urban road projects, "effective immediately". In a response letter written to the federal treasurer Ralph Willis in January 1996, the state treasurer Michael Egan highlighted that the policy would impact the M5 East and Eastern Distributor projects, and estimated that the policy would result in an "increase the cost of the Eastern Distributor project by between $70 million and $90 million". As a result, the announcement was "sufficient to halt the progress of the Eastern Distributor project" and the appointment of AML as the successful proponent was not formally endorsed. The policy was not enacted into legislation by the Keating government prior to the March 1996 federal election. The newly-elected Howard government reversed the policy in June 1996 and confirmed that the Eastern Distributor has been certified as "an urban road project which may utilise infrastructure bonds for financing purposes".

Following the reversal of the federal government policy, on 13 August 1996 the appointment of AML as the successful proponent and the decision to proceed with the project was formally announced. The agreement was signed in 1997, and under the concession agreement, AML would own and operate the tollway for 38 years after full opening.

==== Planning ====
In 1994, RTA decided to delay the EIS until after the selection of the preferred proponent, explaining that if an EIS was prepared then (1994), then "it is unlikely to contain the most innovative solutions to construction and environmental issues and could require a further EIS being required before work could commence". However, there would be a risk that substantial changes to the EIS would risk a new tender.

The EIS for the Eastern Distributor was eventually exhibited in November to December 1996. 2,762 submissions were received during the exhibition period. RTA proposed significant modifications in April 1997, which included:

- a landscaped canopy over the northern end of the motorway (where it meets Cahill Expressway) near the Art Gallery
- relocation of the northern tunnel portal north of Cathedral Street
- lowering of the motorway in a trench between South Dowling Street (known as the "Parkway scheme")

Due to the substantial modifications, RTA sought advice from the Independent Commission Against Corruption (ICAC) on whether a new tender was required; ICAC later advised that it was not required. The proposed modifications increased project costs by A$132 million. As a result, the concession period was increased from 38 to 48 years, and the opening toll price was also increased from A$2.50 to A$3.00.

The New South Wales Audit Office undertook a performance audit of the proposed tollway and tabled its report in Parliament on 28 May 1997, with the report finalised in July 1997. A planning assessment report by the Director-General of Department of Urban Affairs and Planning was published on 2 June 1997, and the project was approved by the Minister for Urban Affairs and Planning on 26 June 1997, subject to 151 conditions. Actual construction started soon after in August 1997.

The passing of the Roads Act of 1993 updated road classifications and the way they could be declared within New South Wales. Under this act, the Roads & Traffic Authority declared the Eastern Distributor as Tollway 6007, from its interchange with the Cahill Expressway and Cowper Wharf Road in Woolloomooloo (with an off-ramp just outside Hospital Road) to the interchange with Southern Cross Drive and Link Road in Kensington, on 4 July 1997, just before it started construction and 2.5 years before it had officially opened; the tollway today still retains this declaration.

==== Construction ====
Construction using 5,000 workers was undertaken by Leighton Contractors, who was a shareholder of Airport Motorway Limited. Two separate tunnel subcontractors began excavating the northbound tunnel in January 1998, working at either end of the tunnel at Surry Hills and Woolloomooloo. Seven roadheaders were utilised for the tunnel boring, with the rock ceiling then reinforced with rock bolts and shotcrete. On 4 December 1998, the two teams were shaking hands in the middle, 30 metres (100 ft) beneath Taylor Square. By March 1999, all digging had been completed, after 400,000 cubic metres (520,000 cu yd) of soil, largely Sydney sandstone was removed, equal to 40,000 truckloads.

At a cost of $730 million, the motorway was opened on 19 December 1999, except for the William Street on- and off-ramps which were opened on 23 July 2000, just in time for the 2000 Summer Olympics. As part of the agreement which defined the 48 years of concession period, the motorway will be due to revert to government ownership on 23 July 2048.

After opening, a number of changes were made to surface streets:

- Crown Street was converted from one-way northbound to two-way
- Bourke Street was converted from one-way southbound to two-way traffic (south of William Street), closed off at Taylor Square, and closed off to northbound traffic just north of the southbound Eastern Distributor on-ramp
- Palmer Street was converted from one-way southbound to two-way traffic (north of William Street)
- Campbell Street was closed off at Taylor Square

=== Post-opening ===
Soon after opening, southbound motorists were found to be entering the Eastern Distributor from the Cross City Tunnel access point and immediately attempting to cross three lanes for the Anzac Parade off-ramp on the other side of the carriageway. Permanent traffic obstacles were subsequently installed and users are now referred to the Lachlan Street/Dacey Avenue exit, or as through traffic towards Sydney Airport.

Toll booths initially operated at toll points along the Eastern Distributor. With the progressive introduction of electronic tolls, these were replaced by readers on a gantry in 2012 and demolished.

Eastern Distributor was allocated part of Metroad 1 on its opening in 1999. With the conversion to the newer alphanumeric system in 2013, this was replaced with route M1.

In July 2017, the northbound off-ramp exit onto South Dowling Street towards Cleveland Street was closed off for 24 hours per day, 7 days a week, on a six-month trial (initially three months). Prior to the closure, the exit was the last northbound exit before toll and was closed during morning and afternoon peaks. Vehicles would regularly queue at the South Dowling Street/Cleveland Street intersection and spill back onto the motorway via the exit. The trial closure saw significant improvements to traffic congestion along both South Dowling Street and the Eastern Distributor, and increase in speeds on both roads. Following the successful trial, the exit was permanently closed in February 2018.

== Tolls ==
=== Ownership ===
The Eastern Distributor is owned and operated by Airport Motorway Limited (AML) that was originally owned by Trust Company of Australia (73%), Leighton Contractors (17%) and UniSuper (10%). In 1998 the National Australia Bank purchased a 6% stake from Leighton Contractors.

In 2000 Leighton Contractors sold its stake to Macquarie Infrastructure Group in 2000. By 2005, Macquarie Infrastructure Group held 71% of AML. Macquarie Infrastructure Group spun off Sydney Roads Group including its stake in AML in July 2006. Sydney Roads Group was sold to Transurban in April 2007. In September 2007, Transurban acquired a further 4% stake in AML, increasing its stake to 75%. The remaining shareholders are Industry Funds Management (14%) and UniSuper (11%).

=== Toll prices ===
The Eastern Distributor is tolled in the northbound direction only for all traffic that use the main tunnel (Surry Hills/Moore Park to Woolloomooloo). There are two toll points on the Eastern Distributor: one at the northern end of the motorway and one at the William Street/Cross City Tunnel exit. Northbound vehicles along Eastern Distributor are charged the same toll price in either toll point.

At the time of opening, the toll price for light vehicles (cars and motorcycles) was A$3.00. In April 2003, the toll price for heavy vehicles (trucks and buses) was A$7.50.

Toll prices as of 1 July 2025
Toll road	Class A toll prices (Note: Class A vehicles are typically cars and motorcycles; Class B vehicles are all other vehicles including trucks and heavy vehicles.)	Class B toll prices	Toll increase	Toll concessionaire	Expiry of toll concession
Eastern Distributor (northbound only)	$10.06	$20.11	Quarterly on 1 January, 1 April, 1 July, and 1 October, by the greater of the weighted sum of quarterly AWE and quarterly CPI or 1%	Airport Motorway Limited (75.1% Transurban)	July 2048

== Exits and interchanges ==
LGA	Location	km	mi	Destinations	Notes
Sydney	Sydney CBD	0.0	0.0	Cahill Expressway (M1) - North Sydney, Newcastle	Northern terminus of road, route M1 continues north along Cahill Expressway
Sydney	Woolloomooloo	0.1	0.062	Toll point (for northbound traffic only)	
Sydney	Woolloomooloo	0.2	0.12	Cathedral Street (east) - Woolloomooloo; Palmer Street (south), to William Street (east) - Kings Cross, Double Bay, Woollahra	Southbound exit only
Sydney	Woolloomooloo	0.3	0.19	Eastern Suburbs railway line	
Sydney	Woolloomooloo	0.4	0.25	Northern end of tunnel	
Sydney	Darlinghurst	1.2	0.75	Anzac Parade (south) - Randwick, La Perouse; Moore Park Road (east) - Woollahra, Bondi Junction	Southbound exit only
Sydney	Darlinghurst	1.3	0.81	Bourke Street, Woolloomooloo	Southbound entrance only
Sydney	Darlinghurst	1.3	0.81	Cross City Tunnel (eastbound) - Woolloomooloo	Southbound entrance only
Sydney	Darlinghurst	1.6	0.99	Anzac Parade (north) – Moore Park; Moore Park Road (west) – Paddington	Northbound entrance only
Sydney	Darlinghurst	1.65	1.03	William Street – Kings Cross, Sydney CBD; Palmer Street, Woolloomooloo	Northbound exit only, toll point at exit
Sydney	Darlinghurst	1.65	1.03	Cross City Tunnel (west) – Sydney CBD	Northbound exit only, toll point at exit
Sydney	Surry Hills–Moore Park boundary	2.1	1.3	Southern end of tunnel	
Sydney	Surry Hills–Moore Park boundary	2.2	1.4	South Dowling Street (northbound) - Surry Hills	Northbound entrance only
Sydney	Surry Hills–Moore Park boundary	2.4	1.5	CBD and South East Light Rail	
Sydney	Moore Park	2.5– 2.8	1.6– 1.7	Tunnel (under Cleveland Street)	
Sydney	Moore Park–Redfern boundary	3.2	2.0	South Dowling Street (southbound), to Dacey Avenue and Lachlan Street - Randwick, Alexandria, Rosebery	Southbound exit only
Sydney	Waterloo	3.5– 4.1	2.2– 2.5	Dacey Todman Underpass tunnel	
Sydney–Randwick boundary	Zetland–Kensington boundary	4.4	2.7	South Dowling Street (north) – Waterloo, Moore Park; O'Dea Avenue (west) – Waterloo, Zetland; Todman Avenue - Randwick, Kensington	Northbound exit and southbound entrance only
Sydney–Randwick boundary	Zetland–Kensington boundary	4.7	2.9	Link Road – Rosebery	Northbound exit and entrance only
Sydney–Randwick boundary	Zetland–Kensington boundary	4.7	2.9	Southern Cross Drive (M1) – Mascot, Sydney Airport, Wollongong, Canberra	Southern terminus of road, route M1 continues south along Southern Cross Drive
1.000 mi = 1.609 km; 1.000 km = 0.621 mi: Electronic toll collection; Incomplete access; Route transition
