= Sydney Orbital Network =

Road in New South Wales, Australia

Sydney Orbital Network New South Wales
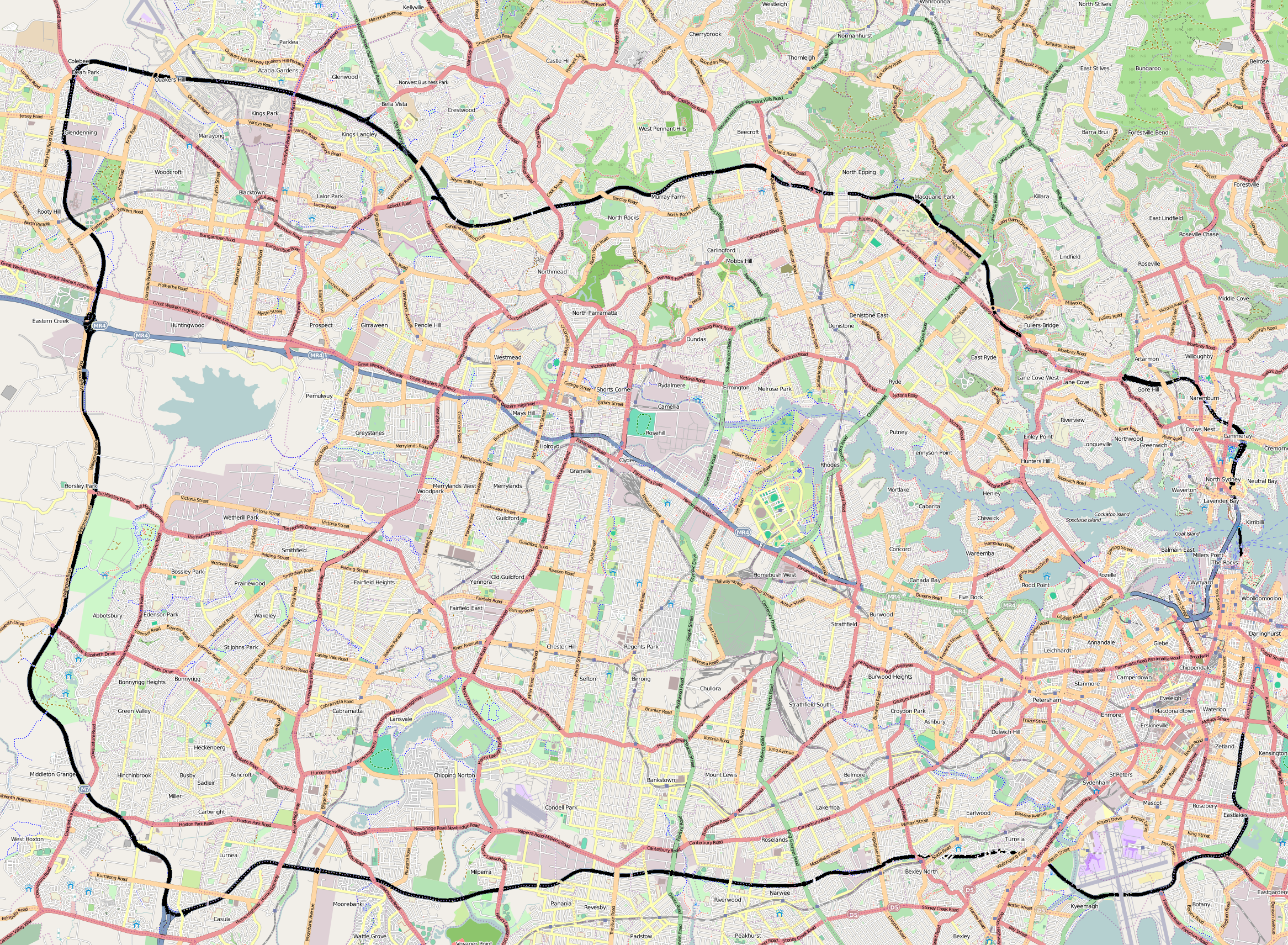
- Map of the Sydney Orbital Network

General information
- Type: Motorway
- Location: Sydney
- Length: 110 km (68 mi)
- Opened: Completed 2007

Major junctions
- Hume Motorway; Roden Cutler Interchange, Prestons; •; M4 Motorway; Light Horse Interchange, Eastern Creek; •; NorthConnex; West Pennant Hills; •; M8 Motorway; Kingsgrove

Highway system
- Highways in Australia; National Highway • Freeways in Australia; Highways in New South Wales

The Sydney Orbital Network is a 110 kilometre motorway standard ring road around and through Sydney, the capital of New South Wales in Australia. It runs north from Sydney Airport, underneath the CBD to the North Shore, west to the Hills District, south to Prestons and then east to connect with the airport. Much of the road is privately owned and financed by tolls.

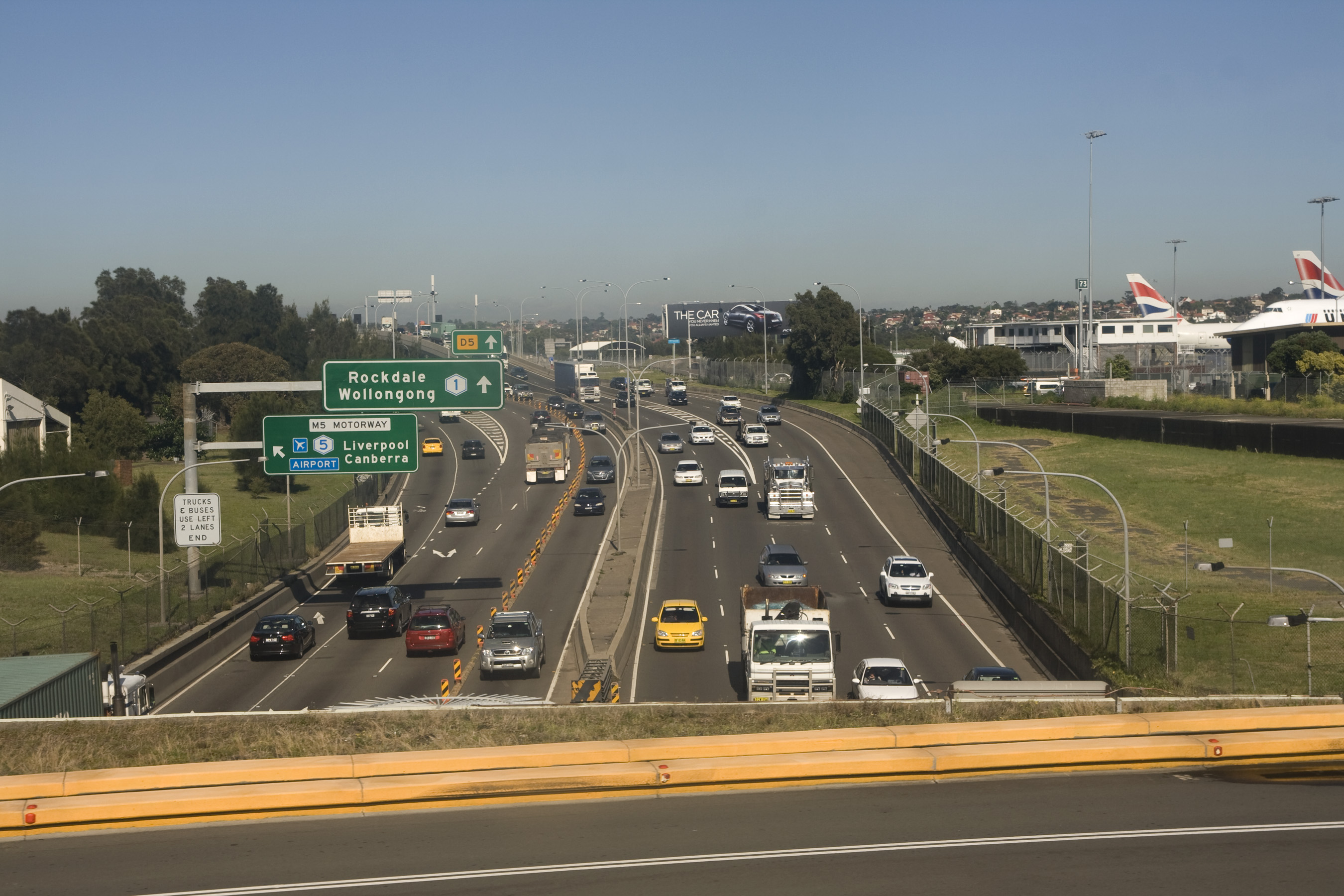
General Holmes Drive, looking south-west from the Sydney Airport overpass. It is part of the M1 and Orbital Road.

== History ==
Planning for this beltway, orbital or ring road began as early as 1962 under the "County of Cumberland scheme" (CCS) and was talked about as far back as 1944. Then, from 1973 to 1989, things started to take shape with new sections opening-up and then further advancing by 1999. In 2007, the Lane Cove Tunnel opened, completing the orbital network.

== Motorways that make up the orbital road ==
The 110 km Sydney orbital consists of several motorways and freeways:

- Eastern Distributor
- Southern Cross Drive
- General Holmes Drive
- M5 Motorway (both M5 South-West and M5 East motorways)
- Westlink M7
- M2 Hills Motorway
- M4 Motorway
- M8 Motorway
- Lane Cove Tunnel
- Gore Hill Freeway
- Warringah Freeway
- Sydney Harbour Tunnel

The major sunken/underground sections of the orbital are:

- Sydney Harbour Tunnel
- Eastern Distributor
- M5 East tunnel
- Epping Tunnel (M2 Hills Motorway, a small section of tunnel)
- Trenched section of the M2 Hills Motorway (in between Epping Road, just west of Lane Cove Tunnel)
- Lane Cove Tunnel

The major elevated sections are:

- Parts of the Westlink M7
- Parts of Southern Cross Drive and General Holmes Drive (past the airport)

== Tolling ==
The Sydney Orbital Road Network consists of a number of roads built by private companies: tolling is mostly unavoidable when using the road network. A $6.95 toll was added to the M5 East motorway from King Georges Road to Marsh Street on the 5 July 2020, to coincide with the opening of the M8 tunnel.

Toll prices as of 1 July 2025
Toll road	Class A toll prices (Note: Class A vehicles are typically cars and motorcycles; Class B vehicles are all other vehicles including trucks and heavy vehicles.)	Class B toll prices	Toll increase	Toll concessionaire	Expiry of toll concession
Eastern Distributor (northbound only)	$10.06	$20.11	Quarterly on 1 January, 1 April, 1 July, and 1 October, by the greater of the weighted sum of quarterly AWE and quarterly CPI or 1%	Airport Motorway Limited (75.1% Transurban)	July 2048
M5 South-West Motorway	$5.83	$17.48	Quarterly on 1 January, 1 April, 1 July, and 1 October by positive quarterly CPI	Interlink Roads (100% Transurban)	10 December 2026 (Note: After 10 December 2026, WestConnex distance-based tolls apply to the M5 South-West.)
M2 Hills Motorway	$3.00 (min.) $10.15 (max.)	$9.01 (min.) $30.45 (max.)	Quarterly on 1 January, 1 April, 1 July, and 1 October, by the greater of quarterly CPI or 1%	Transurban	June 2048
Lane Cove Tunnel	$4.13	$14.26	Quarterly on 1 January, 1 April, 1 July, and 1 October, by the greater of quarterly CPI or 1%	Transurban	June 2048
Sydney Harbour Tunnel (southbound only)	$4.41 (max., varies by time of day)	Same as Class A prices	No regular toll increase	NSW Motorways (Note: The Sydney Harbour Tunnel is owned by the government and has no toll concessions.)	–

Toll prices as of 1 July 2025
Toll road	Class A toll prices (Note: Class A vehicles are typically cars and motorcycles; Class B vehicles are all other vehicles including trucks and heavy vehicles)			Class B toll prices	Toll increase	Toll concessionaire	Expiry of toll concession
Toll road	Flagfall	Charge per km	Toll cap	Class B toll prices	Toll increase	Toll concessionaire	Expiry of toll concession
Westlink M7	–	$0.5047	$10.09	3 x of Class A prices	Quarterly on 1 January, 1 April, 1 July, and 1 October, by quarterly CPI	NorthWestern Roads (NWR) Group (50% Transurban, 25% QIC, 25% CPP)	June 2051
WestConnex (M4, M5 East, M8)	$1.73	$0.6411	$12.25	3 x of Class A prices	Annually on 1 January, by the greater of CPI or 4% until December 2040, and then by positive CPI only	Sydney Transport Partners (9% Tawreed Investments 10.5% CPPIB, 10% Caisse de dépôt et placement du Québec (CDPQ), 20.5% Australian Super, 50% Transurban)	2060

== Highway links ==
Intercity highways are linked to the Orbital, moving traffic away from the old busy National Routes. They are:

- NorthConnex - linking M1 Pacific Motorway, Newcastle and Brisbane to M2 Hills Motorway
- M4 Motorway - linking Great Western Highway and Bathurst to Westlink M7
- Hume Motorway - linking Melbourne and Canberra to M5 Motorway and Westlink M7
- King Georges Road - linking Princes Highway, Princes Motorway and Wollongong to M5 Motorway

== Proposed or missing freeway/motorway links ==
- M6 Motorway – A proposal that links the New M5 Tunnels and the southern suburbs of Sydney, as the M6 Motorway. The only section which was built is the Captain Cook Bridge and its approaches. Land is still reserved north of this point through Sandringham, and south through the Royal National Park. In October 2017, the government announced it will proceed with Stage 1 of the F6 extension, which will run via two 4 km tunnels linking the New M5 tunnels at Arncliffe to President Avenue at Kogarah. In October 2019, the government announced a name change of the extension to M6 Motorway and also confirmed the completion date of Stage 1 would be pushed back to late 2025, with major construction to begin by early 2022. This has since been shifted back to 2028.
- Western Harbour Tunnel - linking the WestConnex via the Rozelle Interchange with the North Shore at Cammeray.
