= Endeavour Bridge =

Bridge in Australia

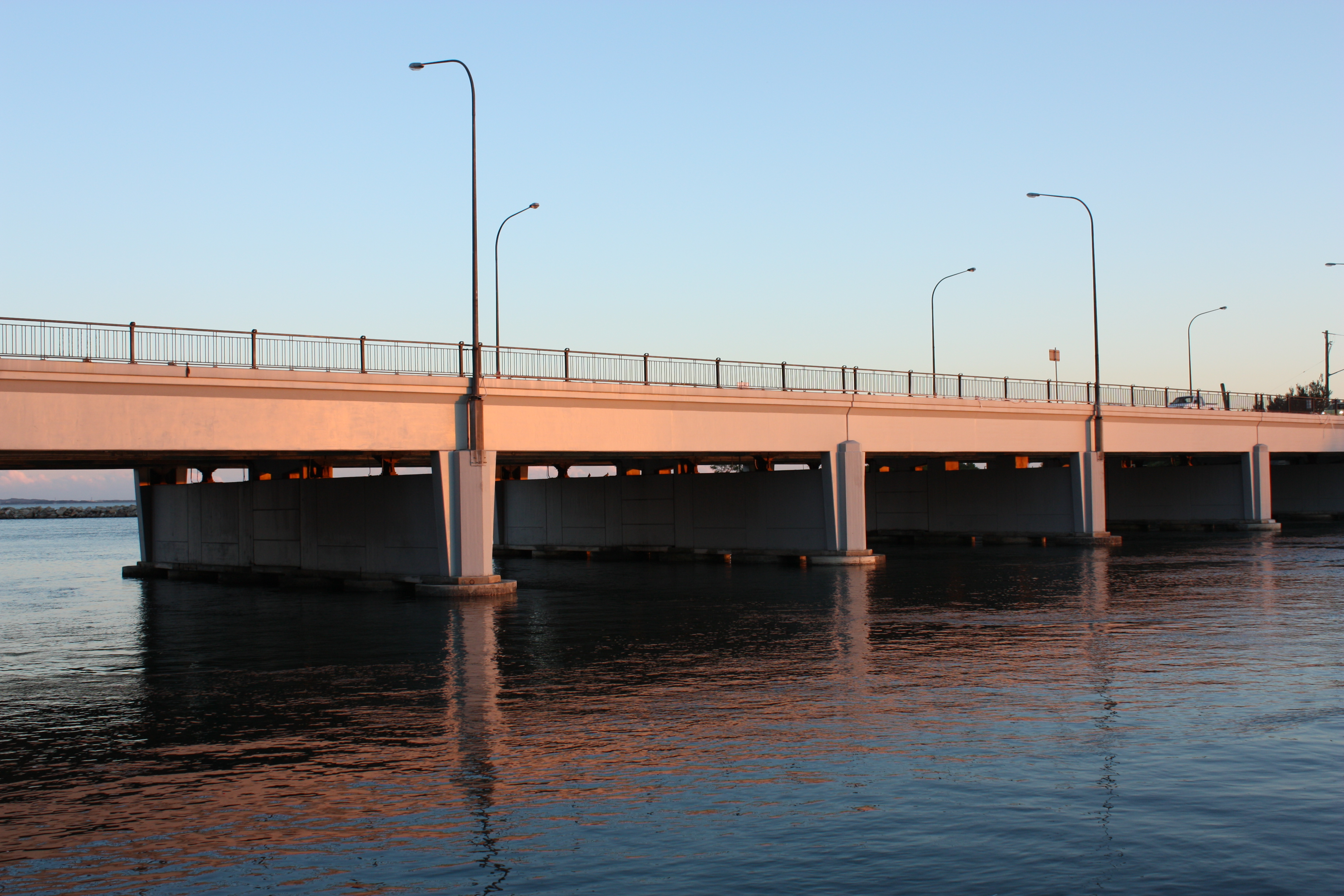
- Endeavour Bridge, looking south-east
- Coordinates: 33°56′50″S 151°10′04″E
- Carries: General Holmes Drive: Motor vehicles; Pedestrians
- Crosses: Cooks River
- Locale: Mascot, Bayside Council, Sydney, New South Wales, Australia
- Begins: Mascot
- Ends: Kyeemagh
- Named for: HMS Endeavour
- Owner: Transport for NSW
- Preceded by: M5 East Motorway

Characteristics
- No. of lanes: 6

History
- Opened: May 1951

Location
- Interactive map of Endeavour Bridge

The Endeavour Bridge is a road bridge that carries the General Holmes Drive (A1) across the Cooks River, from Mascot to Kyeemagh in the Bayside Council local government area in southern Sydney, New South Wales, Australia. The bridge is located adjacent to the river mouth, where the Cooks River empties into Botany Bay.

The bridge is maintained by Transport for NSW.

== History ==
The Endeavour Bridge was opened to traffic in May 1951 as two, two-lane bridges. The road carries motor vehicles and a grade-separated pedestrian footpath.

It was built due to the diversion of Cooks River required by the expansion of Sydney Airport. The bridges were constructed before the water flow was diverted beneath them.

In 1963 the two bridges were widened by extending their decks into the area between them, resulting in one six-lane bridge. This upgrade was undertaken in conjunction with the upgrade of General Holmes Drive from four to six lanes, which was the first upgrading of a 'county road' as part of the County of Cumberland Planning Scheme.

== Etymology ==
The Endeavour Bridge takes its name from HMS Endeavour, the ship commanded by James Cook, an English explorer, navigator and cartographer. Lieutenant Cook and the crew of the Endeavour were the first recorded European expedition to navigate and map the eastern coastline of Australia. They arrived in nearby Botany Bay in 1770.

== See also ==
- List of bridges in Sydney
