= Brighton-Le-Sands, New South Wales =

Brighton Le Sands
- Suburb
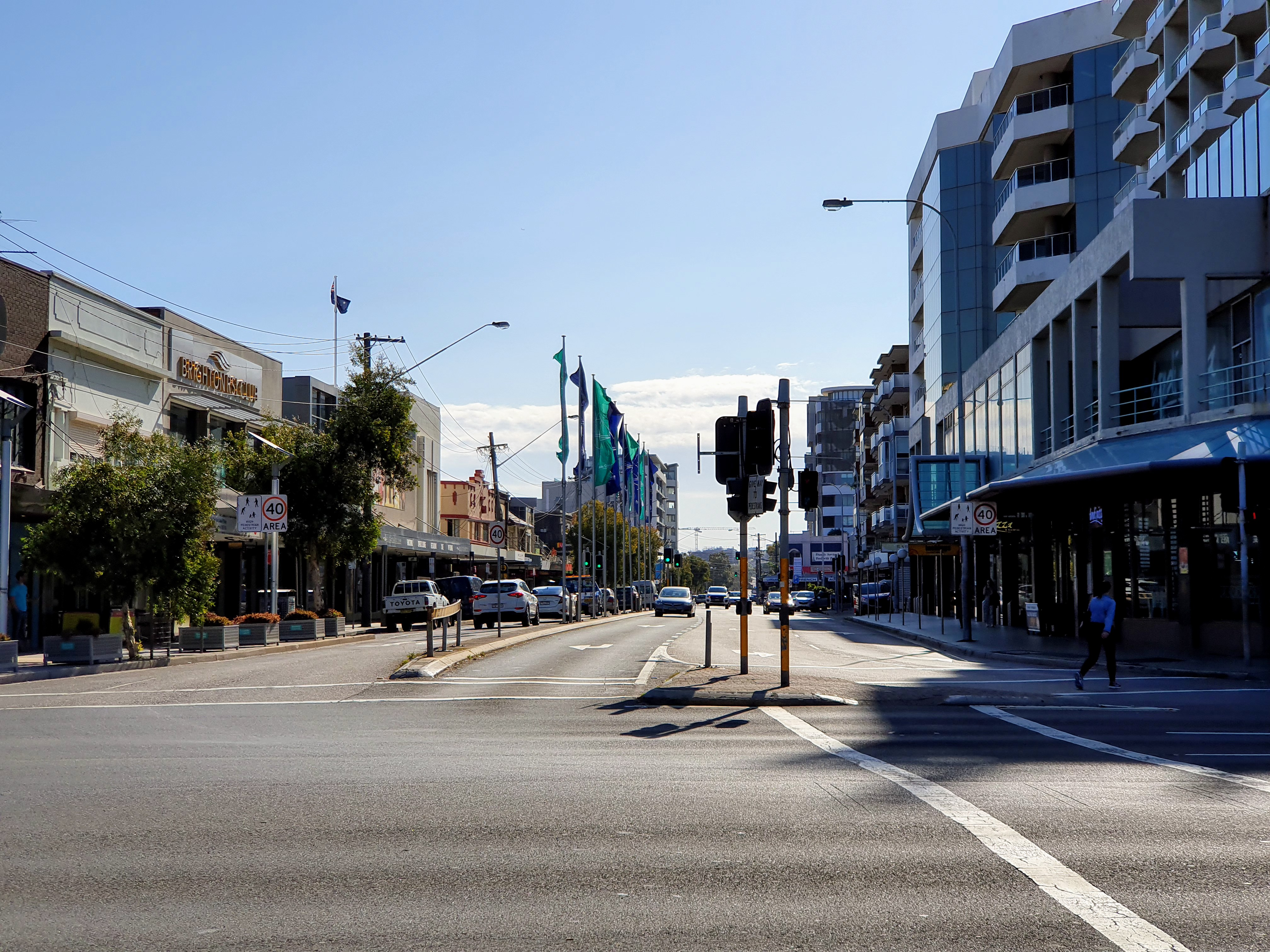
- Bay Street looking west towards Rockdale from waterfront .

- Interactive map of Brighton Le Sands
- Country: Australia
- State: New South Wales
- City: Sydney
- LGA: Bayside Council
- Location: 13 km (8.1 mi) SSW of Sydney CBD

Government
  - State electorate: Rockdale
  - Federal division: Kingsford Smith
- Elevation: 11 m (36 ft)

Population
  - Total: 8,336 (2021 census)
- Postcode: 2216
Suburbs around Brighton Le Sands
Banksia	Kyeemagh
Rockdale	Brighton Le Sands	Botany Bay
Kogarah	Monterey

Brighton Le Sands (formerly Brighton-le-Sands and also known simply as Brighton or Brighton Beach), is a suburb of Sydney in the state of New South Wales, Australia. Situated 13 kilometres south of the Sydney central business district & just 5 km from Sydney's international airport, it fronts the western shore of Botany Bay. B-le-S is in the local government ward of the Bayside Council and is part of the St George district.

Lady Robinsons Beach and Cook Park form the eastern boundary of B-le-S on the historic bay. The beach is known for its off-white sand and runs blade-like 6 km from the breakwaters at Kyeemagh, at the mouth of Cooks River, north, to Dolls Point at the mouth of Georges River, south. The western boundary of B-le-S is green belt comprising remnants of marshland & this is one of the natural features that makes the place unique. The urban fabric is a mixture of California bungalow type houses, medium density home units, high rise apartments, shops, cafés and restaurants. There are also some Victorian-era terrace houses & a handful of Federation-era houses (2026). The Grand Parade runs along the foreshore and is joined at the shopping centre by Bay Street to form a T. The higher density developments are located along or near these roads, the oldest dating from 1970.

== History ==
The traditional owners of the land between Cooks River and Georges River were the Bidgigal, a clan of the Dharug people. Their last camps were displaced from the south-western reaches of Botany Bay in the 1880s & because of the Terra nullius mentality that has obtained since 1788, no compensation was given. The Aboriginal name for the entire bay was Kamay; it was an important place for food gathering: hunting, fishing & foraging. In colonial times, for most of the 19th century the beach was known as Seven Mile Beach & the area was part of what was then called West Botany. The name of the beach was changed to Lady Robinson's Beach in October 1874 to honour Governor Sir Hercules Robinson's wife, née Nea Arthur Ada Rose d'Amour.

Cook Park is a strip of reserve land 100 feet inland from the high water mark, which runs from Kyeemagh to Sans Souci. The name does not commemorate James Cook (1728–1779), the English navigator who was the discoverer of the bay, but Samuel Cook (1830–1910), a well-known newspaperman long associated with the Sydney Morning Herald & a pioneer conservationist, who in the early 1870s advocated that the beachfront be set aside for public use when he saw that land speculation was about to begin. Cook also played a prominent role in the development of nearby Scarborough Park as a public sports ground & scenic area. The entire footprint of the park as it exists today was formerly marshland: the three lakes were formed to drain it via a main running under Florence Street, Ramsgate, to the beachfront.

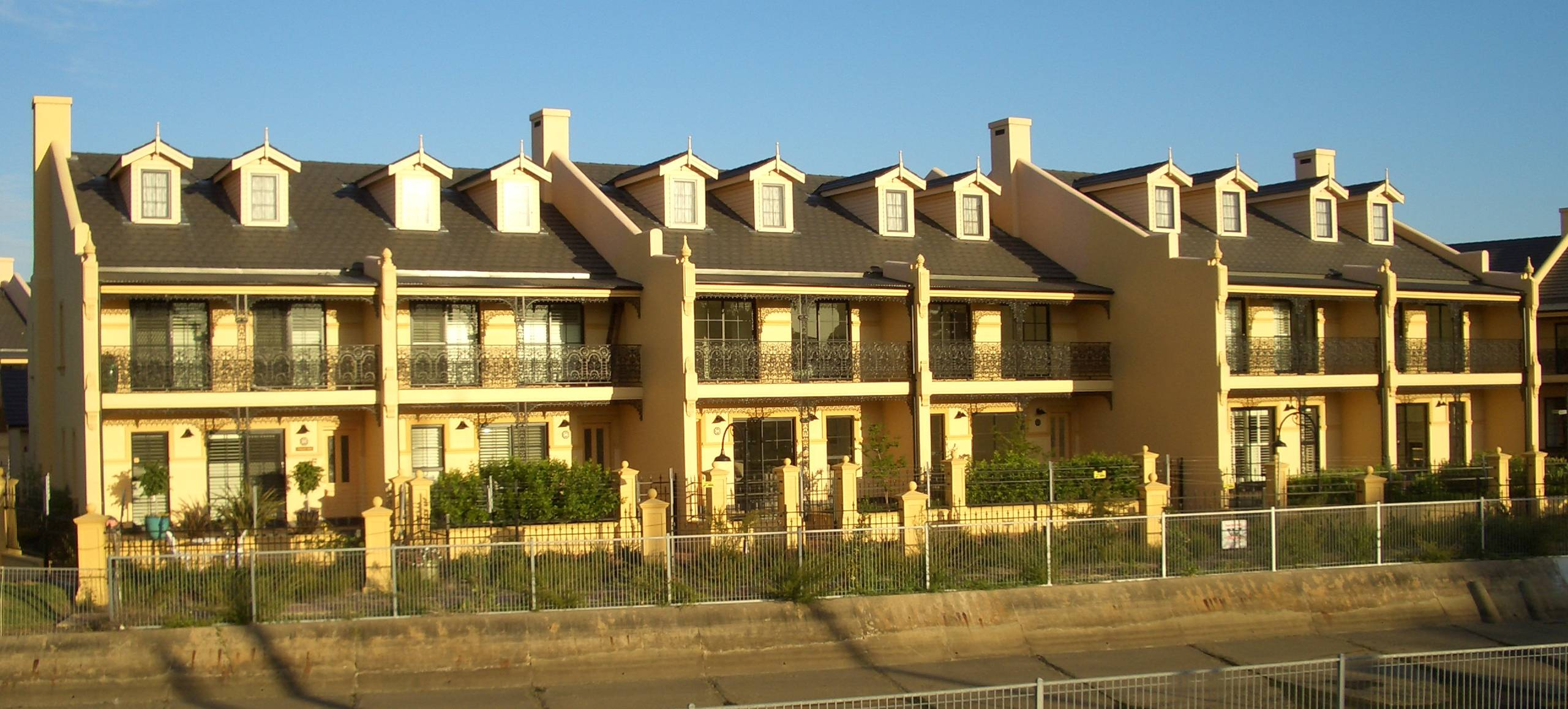
Victorian-style terraces, West Botany Street, built post-2000

Apart from the Aboriginal people, in colonial times the only visitors to the area were runaway convicts, timber getters, shell gatherers & sportsmen, who hunted game in the heath & open forest around the primeval swamp that ran between the two rivers half a mile inland from the beach. A large part of this swamp came under a 60-acre grant made in 1812 to Irish-born ex-convict Patrick Moore - hence the name Patmore's Swamp. Land acquisitions began in the 1840s & among the earliest settlers were market gardeners, orchardists & dairymen. In 1870, Hamburg-born George Herman Hook purchased a strip of land running from the old swamp down to the beachfront, bounded by what are now King's Road & Sybil Lane. Hook built a fine stone house on the site of the present-day infants school & thus qualifies as the earliest wealthy resident. Interestingly, his house was well away from the beach; indeed, it fronted the reedbeds & trees of the swamp. Extensive grounds surrounded the house - punctuated here & there by marble statues on solid stone bases - & bounded by a tall paling fence. Significant too is the fact that Hook's nearest neighbours were also of German extraction: Konrad Franck, William Berghofer & William Heinbokel, all of whom were farmers who had taken up land on the fringes of the swamp where the soil was richest.

Development stepped up after 1884 when the Illawarra railway opened to Hurstville, via Rockdale. In the early 1880s wealthy entrepreneur Thomas Saywell (1837–1928), purchased a tract of sandy waterfront land hitherto considered unsaleable with a view to establishing a seaside resort there. The old Norfolk pines that are still an identifying feature of the B-le-S waterfront today were planted by his workmen. His architect, William Kenwood, in partnership with consulting engineer Harry Kerle, took cues from the world famous Brighton in England, hence the choice of the name New Brighton. In 1885 Saywell initiated construction of a tramway running from Rockdale station down to Lady Robinsons Beach along Bay Street, a distance of a little over a mile. This was no mean feat because his workmen had to cut down a formidable sandstone ridge on the heights at the Rockdale end Saywell financed the entire scheme & was given a 30-year lease on the line. In pursuit of his vision, in time he also built swimming baths, a wharf, a large picnic area called Shady Nook, housing (including a set of double-storey terraces on the waterfront, still standing 2026), a race course, an entertainment hall replete with onion-dome roofs, not to mention the 60-room Brighton Hotel, which graced the current Novotel site for almost 70 years. His amenities were a huge success, so much so that the area soon became known as Brighton-le-Sands. The French-sounding name is no doubt an echo of Saywell's family history: his Huguenot forebears had sought refuge in England in 1604, while he himself received his early education in the north of France between 1841 & 1848, where his family, who were lace-makers, had sought to re-generate their activity. The name 'Saywell' is in fact an anglicized version of their old French name 'Seyuill'.

The tramway was electrified in 1900, & on the expiry of the initial lease in 1914 was taken over by the government. The line was closed in September 1949, as the Sydney tramway system was wound down, alas. A bus route replaced the tram route.Trams in Sydney

Saywell's sea baths attracted huge numbers of Sydney's weekend daytrippers; the bathing area was segregated: women & girls to the north, men & boys to the south, separated by the wharf. Local historians Geeves & Jervis record the existence of a notice that for many years hung on the external shielding of the ladies' baths, which proclaimed: 'BLACKGUARDS PEEP IN - GENTLEMEN PASS ON'. Up until WW II a steam ferry service operated all around Botany Bay, with an important stop at B-le-S.The racecourse, which operated from 1895 to 1911, was a short track & could not compete with nearby Moorefield. Since the tram was a private concern, tickets combined entrance to racecourse & baths. Local kids are said to have made a good thing of this by panhandling punters for the baths half of their ticket.

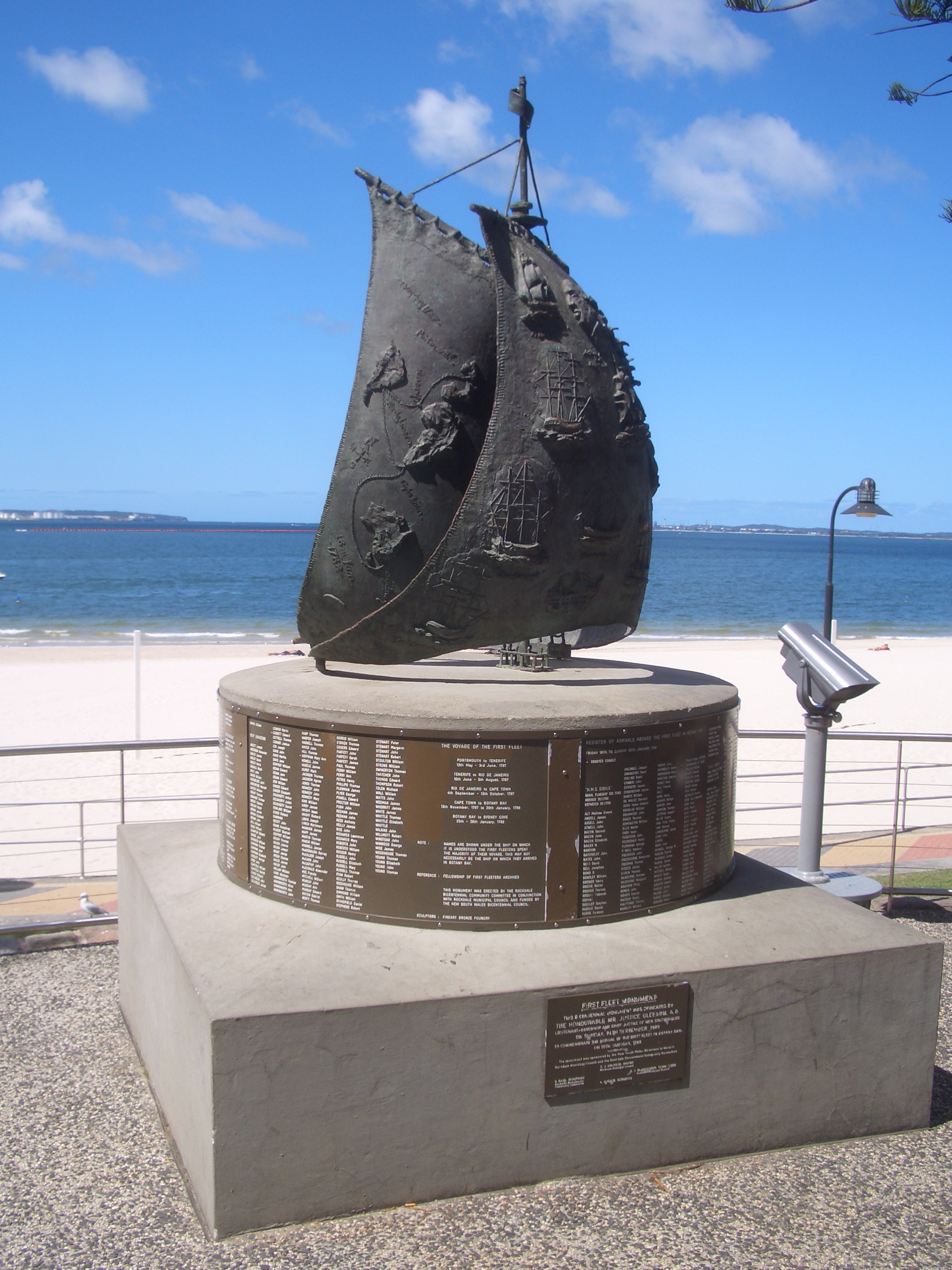
Bicentennial Monument at Botany Bay

Saywell's hotel was stripped of its liquor licence in 1892 due to rowdiness. It is said that the depression of the 1890s brought many unemployed workers to the district and that they frequented the hotel's bar on Bay Street. Some of them lived in shanties in the scrub & sandhills a mile to the north, between the old sewage farm & the bay, as many more did during the Great Depression of the 1930s. For a short period in the early 1890s then, the hotel was home to the Scots College. Albert Aspinall, brother of the first principal, Arthur Ashworth Aspinall, converted the ground floor to classrooms and the hotel rooms on the upper floor into the dormitory. But in 1895, the principal of the college, Arthur Aspinall, decided to shift the establishment to Bellevue Hill. Indeed, swimming baths, pleasure ground, beach & racecourse were doubtless far too distracting for his pupils.

Thanks to Saywell, subdivision for development of the land north of Bay Street for housing was already well under way decades before World War I [Post Office Directories] & continued after, by which time it had also begun south of the main east–west artery. In the late 1920s the then Rockdale Municipal Council built a new & larger timber & wire netting bathing enclosure immediately to the south of Saywell's baths, which in turn became a popular venue from 1928 until the early 1970s. The demise of the municipal baths was largely due to the intensive dredging in the middle of the bay that began in 1964 for the construction of the first north–south runway of Sydney airport. In first phase works alone some 3.5 M cubic metres of sand was lifted from the bed of the bay to form the foundation of the runway. Wave action increased in direct proportion to the deepening of the bed of the bay at the dredging location, in line with the gap between the La Perouse & Kurnell headlands, causing severe stress to the structure of the baths. Before dredging, the bed of the bay at the dredging location was 4 m below low water, after dredging it was 8.3 m below low water. In the winter of 1966 southerly storm swells hit the coastline & funneled into the bay, wrecking the baths and badly eroding the beach all along its length to the extent that even the Grand Parade was under threat of being washed away. Beach restoration projects & the construction of quoins have attempted to restore the damage done to the bay's western shoreline.

== Commercial area ==
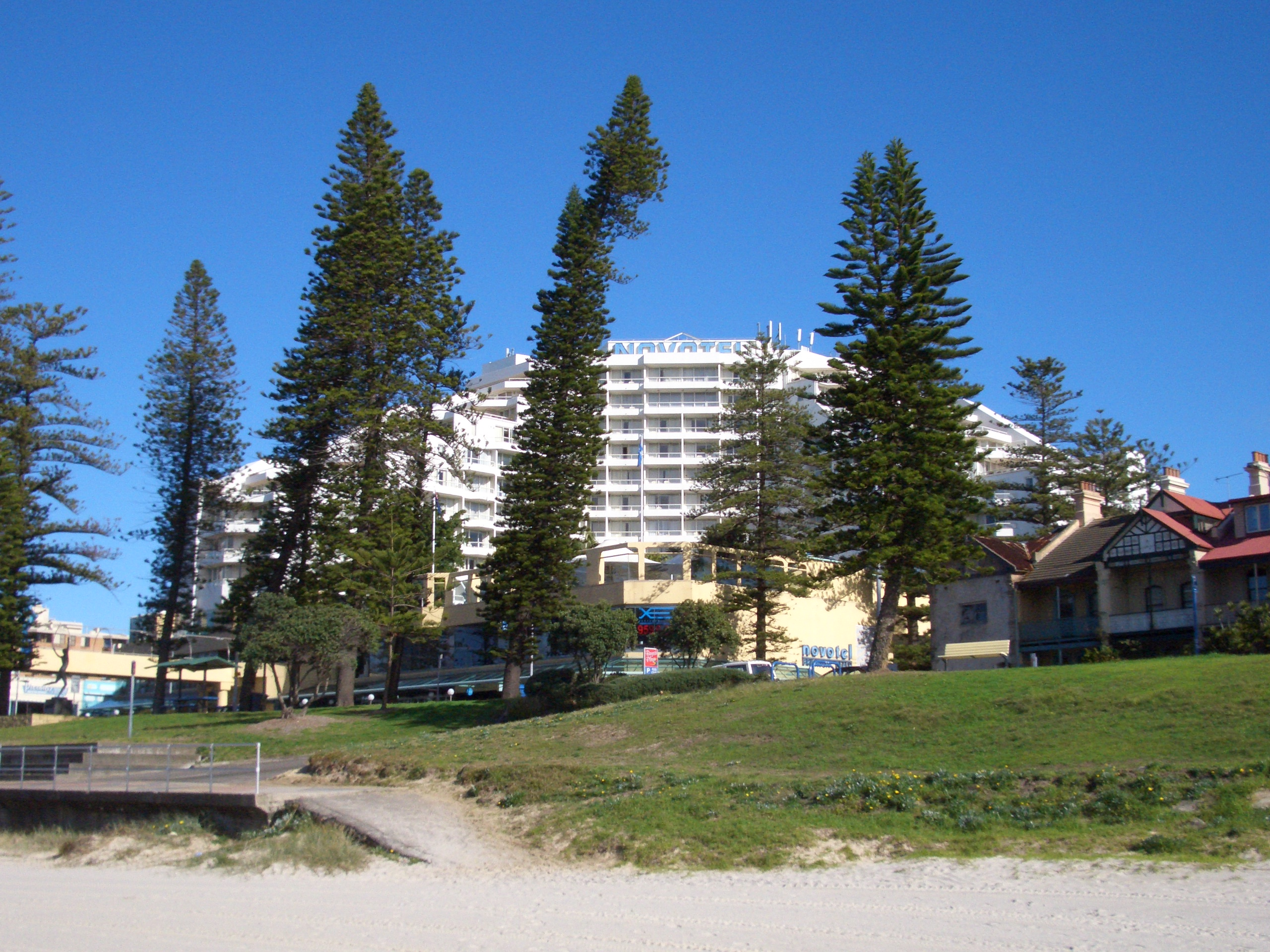
Novotel Hotel built post-1985. Norfolk pines & double storeyed terraces (right, built 1890s) recall the heroic Saywell era.

The main shopping precinct is located along Bay Street & extends from Crawford Road to the foreshore, down a short length of Moate Avenue, north, & a section of the Grand Parade, south. Most of the shop buildings still to be seen there today (2026) date from the 1920s. The Novotel Hotel Brighton Beach, built late 1980s on the north corner of the Bay Street/Grand Parade intersection, also contains mall-type commercial and retail space. Cafés and restaurants have ousted most of the old shops, offering food ranging from Australian, Greek, French, European, Italian, Thai and Japanese. Take-away food shops are plentiful, particularly for seafood, chicken, pastries and gelato. Shops and services include supermarket, banks, post office, RSL club, clothing, jewellery, hair dressers, chemists, doctors, laundromat, bakeries and fishing supplies.

The appearance of a Coles supermarket in Moate Avenue in the late 1990s put paid to the last of the smaller specialty shops: butcheries, bakeries, greengrocers etc. It also soon nudged out the nearby Flemings supermarket and in 2005 led to the closure of the last local family-run fruit barn. The street-level supermarket is part of a high-rise residential complex and the incorporation of a car park was a requirement for Coles to be allowed to trade from this site. Developments to the area are planned as part of a multimillion-dollar upgrade called "Destinations Rockdale".

== Transport ==
Transit Systems operates all the bus routes that pass by Brighton Le Sands. Route 303 runs from Sans Souci to Randwick via B-le-S and Mascot. Route 478 runs from Westfield Miranda to Rockdale railway station, via Ramsgate and B-le-S. Route 479 runs from Rockdale Plaza via the railway station to Kyeemagh and terminates at B-le-S.

Sydney Kingsford Smith International Airport is located just 5 km to the north of B-le-S & since the north–south runways project some 3 km into the waters of Botany Bay, aircraft landing & taking off are now a trademark feature of the views from all along the waterfront.

Views from the waterfront are also affected by the Port Botany complex, built in the late 1970s on the eastern side of the north–south runways, between them & the northern headland of Botany Bay, from Bunnerong to La Perouse. Port Botany is now one of the largest container ports in all of Australia.

Historically, starting in 1903, a weekend ferry service connected Brighton-le-Sands, Sans Souci, Kurnell, and La Perouse. The distance from B-le-S to the headlands is a little over 8 km. In 2020, the local council advocated for a ferry service to be returned.

Constant vehicle traffic, aircraft movement & shipping are a cause of serious pollution to land, sea & sky - they also detract from the natural beauty of historic Botany Bay, which has been disfigured with near total disregard since WW II. It remains to be seen whether the powers that be will choose to address these issues - or turn a blind eye & a deaf ear to them. Unhappily, concerning matters like this, public opinion remains sluggish & insensitive.

Immediately to the west of B-le-S, opposite Bicentennial Park, a tunneling scheme initiated in 2022 for the M6 motorway, running from Arncliffe down to President Avenue, Kogarah, has run into serious trouble. In the final (southernmost) section of the 3.1 billion dollar tunnel, which at this point follows the line of West Botany Street, sinkholes have appeared causing the near collapse of above-ground buildings & roadway. Decision-makers, engineers & planners would have been well advised to seek information about this site before starting to tunnel: well within living memory this entire area was part of the primeval swamp. The question remains: was there any real need for this tunnel? Instead of more concrete infrastructure for vehicles, might it not have been more in line with 21st century aims to create a green bio-diversity tube above ground to save the remnants of swampland & all the living things that go with it.

== Landmarks ==
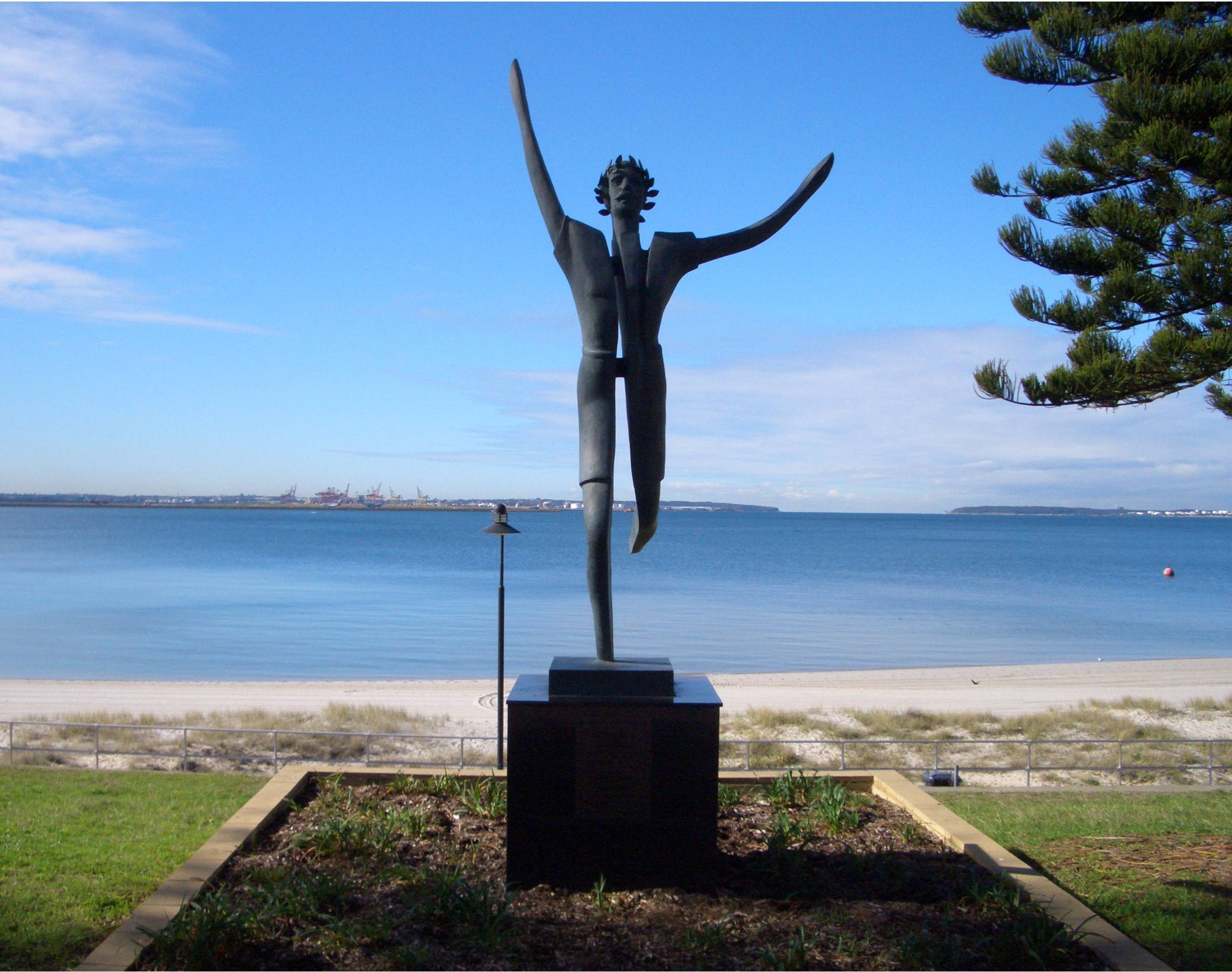
The Olympic statue on The Grand Parade

- Direct views of the historic headlands that define Botany Bay & its opening to the South Pacific. These headlands, La Perouse, left, north; Kurnell, right, south, are separated by a stretch of sea about a mile and a half wide. While they are the birthplace of European Australia, they remain highly significant places for the Aboriginal people, many of whom still live in the La Perouse/Little Bay area.
- Lady Robinsons Beach, Brighton Le Sands Baths, which is now simply a netted enclosure not entirely sharkproof.
- Cook Park, White Oak Reserve, CA Redmond Field Memorial Playing Fields, Tony Baker Reserve, Bicentennial Park East
- Bayside Church (Australian Christian Churches), church plant of Shirelive Church
- St Thomas More Catholic Church, St Andrews Uniting Church, St Marks Anglican Church
- Brighton Le Sands Primary & Infants Schools
- Brighton Le Sands Library (Bayside Library)
- The breakwaters in front of the Endeavour Bridge at nearby Kyeemagh. Built late 1940s using stone quarried at Arncliffe, these breakwaters frame the mouth of the Cooks River, which was re-directed to debouch at this point in 1947 in order to extend the footprint of the airport. Formerly, the river ran into Botany Bay 2 km further on, at Mascot.

== Culture & memorabilia ==
Among other things of enduring interest, the Lydham Hall Historic House & Museum on the heights behind nearby Rockdale conserves some interesting artefacts related to B-le-S. There is, for example, the Bravery award certificate made to English-born WW I veteran Sydney Owen, who on 24 January 1940 went fearlessly to the rescue of 13-year old Maxwell Farrin when he was attacked by a shark while swimming at North Brighton. Unfortunately the boy died of wounds sustained. Visitors to B-le-S should know that sharks frequent the waters of Botany Bay & the Georges & Cooks Rivers.

Lydham Hall, which was once the childhood home of writer Christina Stead, commands superb views over the historic bay. It is operated by the St George Historical Society.

=== Entertainment ===
Since its inception Brighton Le Sands has been a popular location for beach-goers & pleasure-seekers. Multicultural cuisine and night-time entertainment have taken over from the historical drawcards that were the baths, the roller skating rink & the cinema, to mention only three of the former attractions. Since the late 1970s the area has been dubbed 'Little Greece by the Bay' for its many Greek cafés, restaurants and businesses, one of which, on the beach side of the Grand Parade, occupies what were once the dressing sheds of the municipal baths, overlooking the sand and the boardwalk.

It was the centre of celebrations after Greece won the Euro 2004 Football (soccer) Cup. Bay Street was also closed at night and a large screen erected during the Athens 2004 Summer Olympics, however this proved less popular and was not repeated for future sporting events.

=== Attractions ===
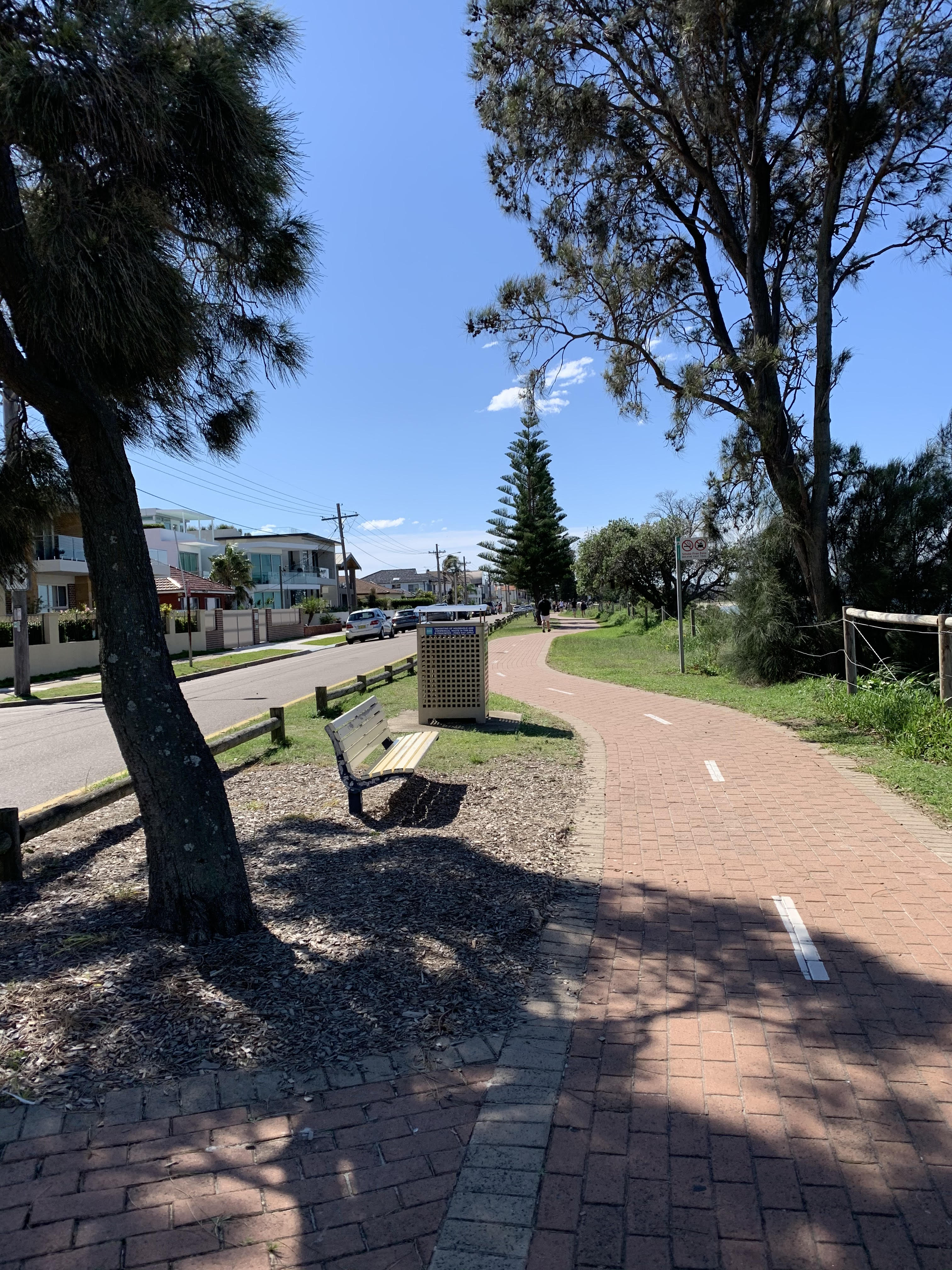
Cycle path along The Grand Parade, facing north.

Brighton Le Sands is the site of the Bicentennial Monument which stands in Cook Park, on the foreshore. It commemorates the 200th anniversary of the arrival of the First Fleet in Botany Bay in 1788. A more interesting piece of modern sculpture is to be found in front of the RSL club on Bay St. It was commissioned in the early 1960s as a tribute to the war dead; unfortunately though, it has been tastelessly re-modelled.

The Greek Australian Sports Hall of Fame was established to commemorate the Athens 2004 Summer Olympics. It was originally housed in the old Royal Volunteer Coastal Patrol building on The Grande Parade close to the intersection of Bay Street, but was moved further south, when this building was demolished in 2008. A statue of 1896 Greek gold medallist Spyros Louis also stands nearby in Cook Park.

A shared paved walkway and cycleway runs the length of Cook Park from Kyeemagh to Sans Souci (approximately 8 km) and is popular with walkers, joggers and cyclists especially on weekends. For cyclists it provides access to the Homebush Bay Cycle route (north from Kyeemagh), and the Cronulla to Kurnell cycleway via the Captain Cook Bridge (south); it also forms part of the Sydney Coastal Walk.

Every New Year's Eve, Bayside Council holds a popular family fireworks display over the water at 9pm which attracts tens of thousands of visitors to Brighton Beach.

== Notable residents ==
- Michael Dransfield, poet, grew up in Brighton Le Sands and was first educated at the local primary school. The family home at 84 Bruce Street is still there (2026).
- June Salter, actress, grew up in Brighton Le Sands and was first educated at the local primary school.
- Paul Landa, barrister and politician, grew up in Brighton-le-Sands and was first educated at the local primary school.The family home at 46 Teralba Road is still there (2026).

== Demographics ==
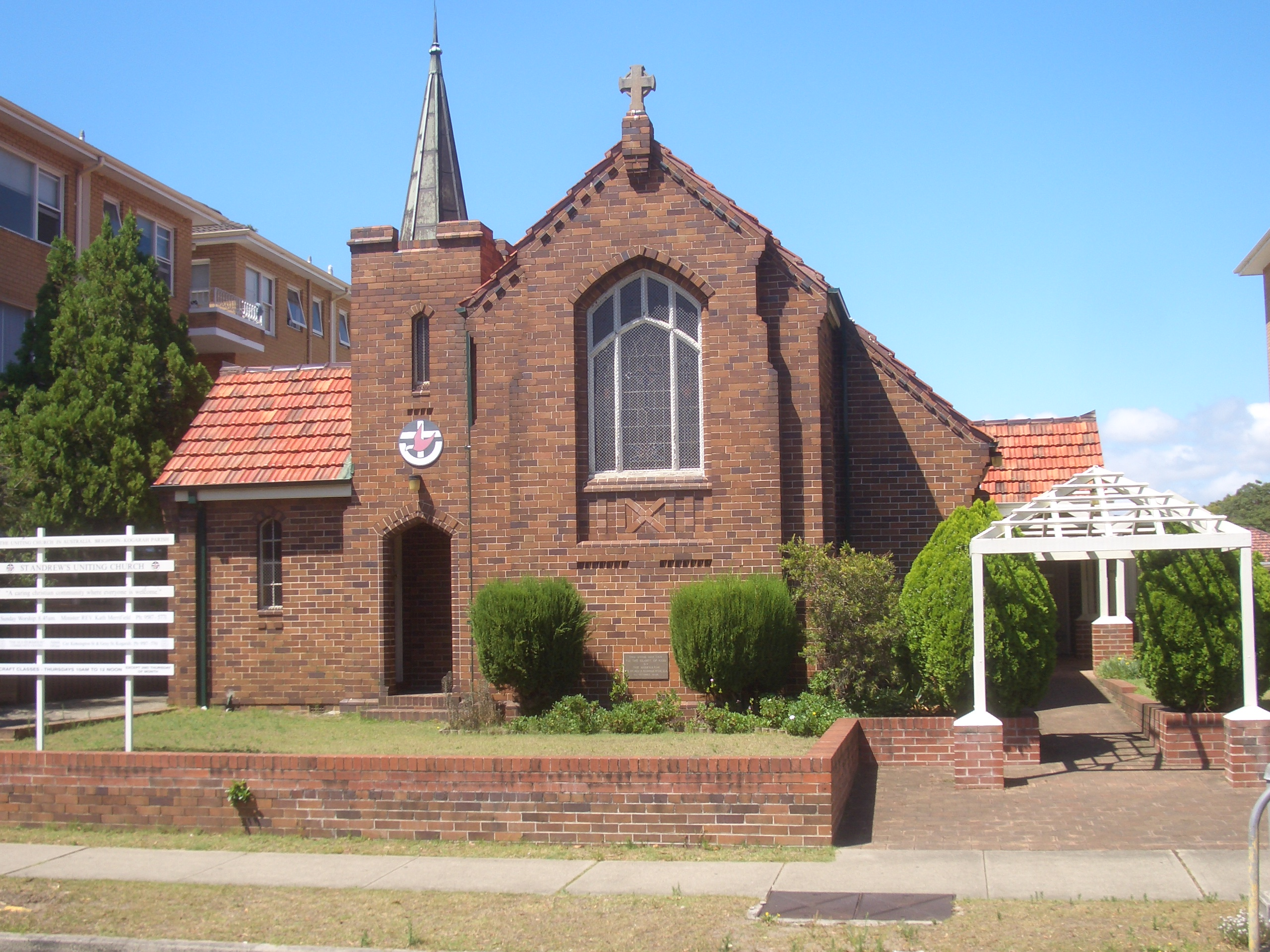
Brighton Uniting Church in Kings Road

According to the 2021 Australian Census of population, there were 8,336 residents in Brighton Le Sands. 51.0% of people were born in Australia. The next most common countries of birth were Greece (5.0%), Egypt (2.7%), Brazil (2.5%), England (1.6%), and Lebanon (1.6%). 45.1% of people spoke only English at home. Other languages spoken at home included Greek (12.1%), Arabic (6.6%), Spanish (3.8%), Portuguese (3.1%), and Macedonian (2.4%). The most common responses for religion were Catholic (24.4%), Eastern Orthodox (21.9%) and No Religion (18.1%).

Brighton Le Sands attracts many young and single residents because of its beach and entertainment lifestyle. It is known for its large Greek-Australian community which is reflected in many of the businesses.

== Politics ==
Brighton Le Sands is in Ward 5 of the local government area of the City of Rockdale, the federal government division of Barton and state government Electoral district of Rockdale. The local government area City of Rockdale has merged with City of Botany Bay to become "Bayside".

== Storm damage ==
It is a curious fact that tides reach inland behind B-le-S via the stormwater channel that follows the course of what was once Muddy Creek, a tributary of the Cooks River, debouching at Bestic Street, Kyeemagh. High tides entering there will reach inland past the Bay Street crossing near the high ground at Rockdale. Not surprisingly, during heavy rains stormwater draining into the channel & colliding there with high tides has caused flooding.

Up until the 1960s prevalent southerly winds would deposit sand on The Grand Parade and The Esplanade making them almost impassable. Sand dunes were still a feature of the waterfront in those days, but they have all but vanished now owing to sand mining & erosion. Typically wave damage would erode the beach; the worst damage occurred on 13 June 1966 (Sydney Morning Herald, 15 June 1966).

== Brighton Le Sands Primary School ==
Built in 1916 to designs by prominent architect Richard Macdonald Seymour Wells, the primary school's main building at 35 Crawford Road was destroyed by fire in January 2000. Wells was a government architect who led the teams that designed buildings as significant as the Sydney Conservatorium of Music & the Dixson wing of the Mitchell Library. The school was subsequently rebuilt in similar style externally but with dubious additions. The infants school, on the south side of the precinct, built in the mid-1920s, also the work of Wells, has been considerably remodelled since the year 2000. It was on this latter site that the area's first notable resident George Herman Hook (1830–1902) built his stone house circa 1871. Hook was a master butcher in partnership with Louis Uhde; the old Moreton Bay fig trees, Norfolk pines & Chinese magnolias still to be seen in the grounds today were planted by him. Another highly colourful figure associated with the school grounds is Francis Foy (1856–1918), co-founder of the once famous Mark Foy's department store. He owned the old Hook property (including the adjoining footprint of the Memorial Playing Fields) from 1908 to 1915 and like Hook continued to beautify the property. A pleasure ground operated on the site during his time, and, given the nearness of the old Moorefield racecourse, it is very likely that Foy stabled some of his race horses there.
