= Australasian Tunnelling Society =

Tunnel Engineering organization of Australia

- Australian Tunnelling Society
- Formation: 1972
- Headquarters: 11 National Circuit, Barton, ACT 2600
- Coordinates: 35°18′31″S 149°07′59″E
- Parent organization: Engineers Australia
- Awards: Allen Neyland Award, David Sugden Award, Women in Tunnelling Award, Bill Bamford Student Tunnelling Achievement Award
- Website: https://australiantunnellingsociety.com.au/
- Formerly called: Australian Tunnel Committee, Australian Tunnelling Association, Australasian Underground Construction and Tunnelling Association, Australasian Tunnelling Society

== Organisational Overview ==
In 1972 the Institution of Engineers Australia (now Engineers Australia) and the Australasian Institute of Mining and Metallurgy (AusIMM) collaborated in the formation of the Australian Tunnelling Committee (ATC). It is a professional organization of engineers and other skilled professionals committed to the maintenance of high standards and the expansion of technical and scientific knowledge pertaining to tunnel construction.

The ATC was renamed the Australian Tunnelling Association in 1974, in the same year as the first Australian Tunnelling Conference in Melbourne.

In 1981 the Australian Tunnelling Association became the Australian Underground Construction and Tunnelling Association (AUCTA), operating as a technical society sponsored by Engineers Australia and AusIMM under status approved by the Councils of both organisations. In 2005 a New Zealand Chapter of the Technical Society was formed, and to better reflect its international membership, AUCTA changed its name to the Australasian Tunnelling Society (ATS).

The ATS is a member of the International Tunneling and Underground Space Association, maintaining its affiliation via active membership including participation in Working Groups, committees and special interest groups. The members of the ATS provide a cross section of the local contracting, consultant and client organisations across the regional and have been involved in List of tunnels in Australia.

== Local Active Groups and Special Interest Groups ==
- New South Wales;
- Queensland;
- South Australia;
- Victoria;
- Western Australia;
- Australian Shotcrete Society; and
- Tunnel Systems Sub-group.

== Past Australian Tunnelling Conferences and Symposium ==
The ATS regularly organises conferences to drive knowledge sharing and industry best practice across the region.

- 1970 - Symposium on Raise and Tunnel Boring (Melbourne), 14–15 August 1970
- 1974 - Re-Shaping Cities Using Underground Construction (Melbourne), 1974
- 1978 - 3rd Australian Tunnelling Conference (Sydney), 12–15 September 1978
- 1981 - 4th Australian Tunnelling Conference (Melbourne), March 1981
- 1984 - 5th Australian Tunnelling Conference - "State of the Art in Underground Development and Construction" (Sydney), 22–24 October 1984
- 1987 - 6th Australian Tunnelling Conference (Melbourne), March 1987
- 1990 - 7th Australian Tunnelling Conference - "The Underground Domain" (Sydney), 11–13 September 1990
- 1993 - 8th Australian Tunnelling Conference - "Finding Common Ground" (Sydney), 24–26 August 1993
- 1996 - 9th Australian Tunnelling Conference (Sydney), 27–29 August 1996
- 1999 - 10th Australian Tunnelling Conference - "The Race for Space" (Melbourne), 21–24 March 1999
- 2002 - ITA General Assembly and 11th Australian Tunnelling Conference (Sydney)
- 2005 - 12th Australian Tunnelling Conference - "Tunnelling Towards Better Cities" (Brisbane), 17–20 April 2005
- 2005 - Symposium: Geotechnical Aspects of Tunnelling for Infrastructure Projects, October 2005
- 2007 - Symposium: New Metrorail City Project - Tunnelling and Underground Structures, September 2007
- 2008 - 13th Australian Tunnelling Conference (Melbourne), 4–7 May 2008
- 2011 - 14th Australasian Tunnelling Conference - "Development of Underground Space" (Auckland), 8–10 May 2011
- 2014 - 15th Australasian Tunnelling Conference - "Underground Space - Solutions for the Future" (Sydney), 17–19 September 2014
- 2017 - 16th Australasian Tunnelling Conference - "Challenging Underground Space: Bigger, Better, More" (Sydney), 30 October - 1 November 2017
- 2021 - 17th Australasian Tunnelling Conference - "2020 Vision: Innovating the Next 50 years" (Melbourne), 10–13 May 2021
- 2023 - 18th Australasian Tunnelling Conference - "Trends and Transitions in Tunnelling" (Auckland), 5–8 November 2023
- 2025 - 19th Australasian Tunnelling Conference - "Underground Space: Securing our Future" (Perth), 10–14 November 2025
- 2027 - 20th Australasian Tunnelling Conference - "Shaping an Underground Future: Technology, Sustainability & Resilience" (Brisbane), 8–11 November 2027 https://anztunnelconference.com/
