= Cahill Expressway =

Highway in Sydney, New South Wales, Australia

Cahill Expressway New South Wales
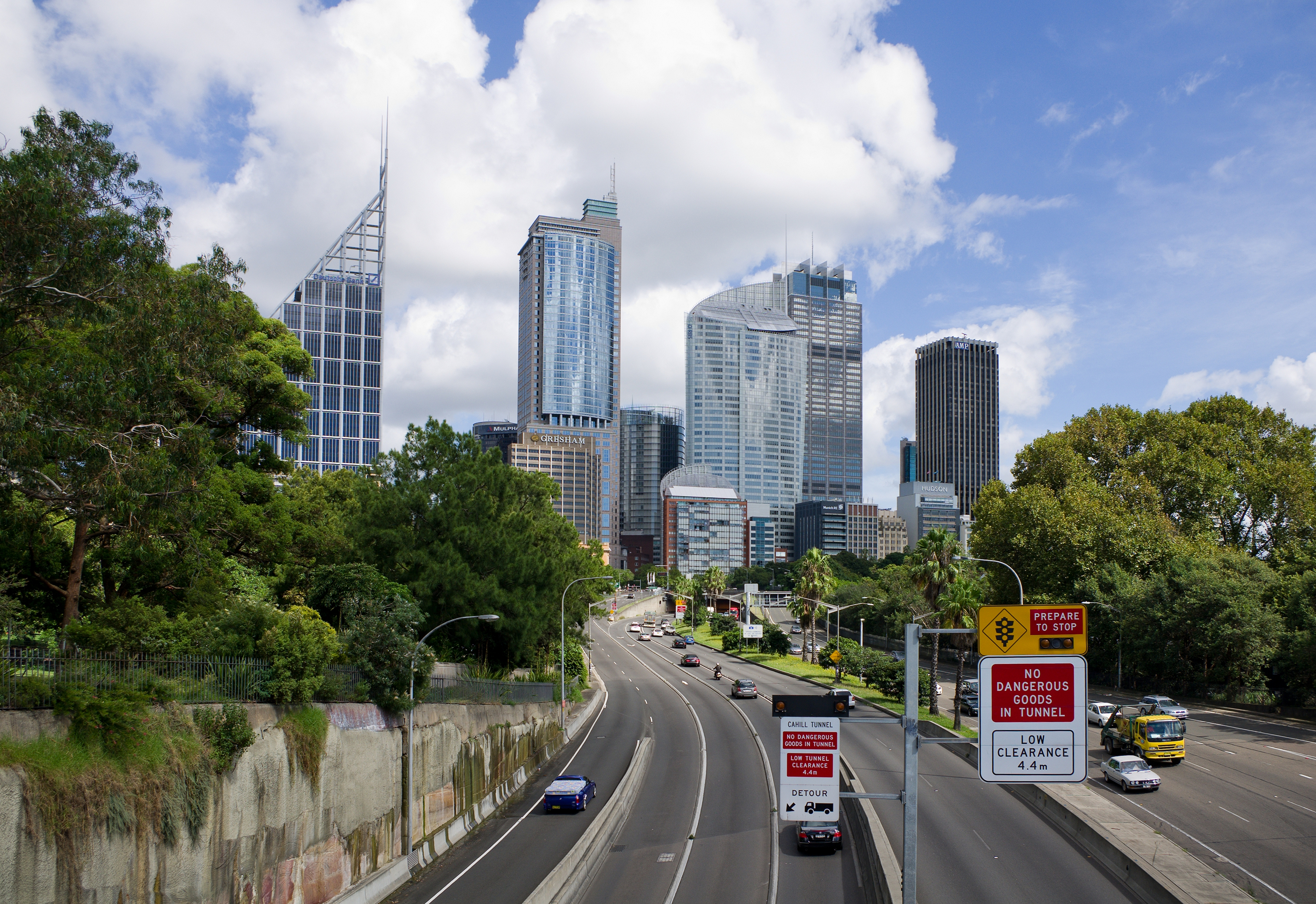
- Cahill Expressway and the Sydney CBD, as seen looking northwest from Art Gallery Road
- Coordinates: 33.860627°S 151.205760°E (Northwest end); 33.868727°S 151.218295°E (Southeast end)

General information
- Type: Expressway
- Length: 2.1 km (1.3 mi)
- Opened: 1958
- Gazetted: December 1964
- Route number(s): M1 (2013–present) (Harbour Tunnel–Woolloomooloo)
- Former route number: Metroad 1 (1993–2013); National Route 1 (1992–1993) (Harbour Tunnel–Woolloomooloo)

Major junctions
- Northwest end: Bradfield Highway; Millers Point, Sydney
- Sydney Harbour Tunnel
- Southeast end: Eastern Distributor Woolloomooloo, Sydney

Location(s)
- Major suburbs / towns: The Rocks, Circular Quay

Highway system
- Highways in Australia; National Highway • Freeways in Australia; Highways in New South Wales

Cahill Expressway is an urban freeway in Sydney. It links the southern end of the Sydney Harbour Bridge via an elevated roadway, a tunnel and cuttings between the Royal Botanic Garden and The Domain, to Woolloomooloo in Sydney's inner-eastern suburbs.

The Cahill Expressway was the first freeway constructed in Australia, with the first section opening to traffic in March 1958. It is named after the then New South Wales Premier John Joseph Cahill, who also approved construction of the Sydney Opera House.

== Route ==
The Cahill Expressway passing directly above Circular Quay station.

The Cahill Expressway starts at the interchange with the Bradfield Highway and heads east as a four-lane road on the upper level of a two-level viaduct across the northern edge of the Sydney CBD at Circular Quay, before turning south at the interchange with the Sydney Harbour Tunnel and then southeast into the 371-metre (1,217 ft) Domain Tunnel, located underneath the Royal Botanic Garden. It emerges soon afterwards in a cutting, then enters another tunnel under The Domain, before ending at the interchange with Cowper Wharf Road and continuing south as the Eastern Distributor. Entry ramps for the northwestern end of the Cahill Expressway also exist heading southbound along parts of the Warringah Freeway in North Sydney and the Bradfield Highway across the Harbour Bridge.

At the western end of the Cahill Expressway traffic reaches the Harbour Bridge to travel north via a tunnel under the Bradfield Highway then an upward anti-clockwise spiral, traversing 270° in doing so.

The expressway forms a link between Sydney's eastern and northern suburbs, by connecting the Eastern Distributor to the Sydney Harbour Bridge and Sydney Harbour Tunnel. It allows travel directly from Kingsford-Smith Airport to the northern suburbs without traffic signals. The traffic on the elevated section was reduced by half following the opening of the Sydney Harbour tunnel in 1992, but has increased again since then as the increased road capacity as a result of the construction of the tunnel has encouraged greater car usage.

The elevated section is on a double deck viaduct, with the top deck carrying the Cahill Expressway, and the lower deck the City Circle railway and Circular Quay railway station.

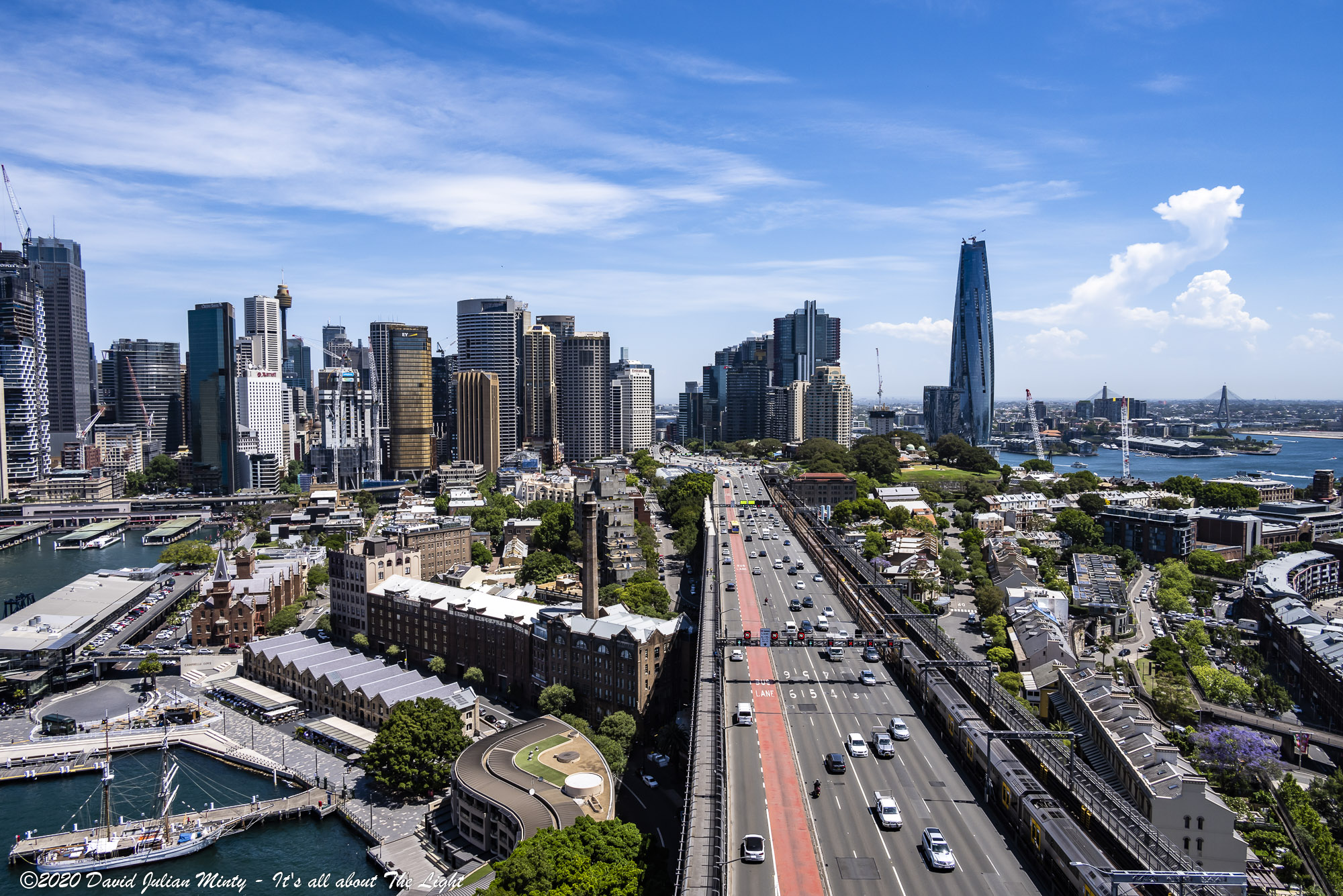
Southern approach of the Sydney Harbour Bridge. The leftmost lane feeds directly to the Cahill Expressway.

The expressway has a pedestrian walkway next to the traffic lanes, where great views of the Sydney Harbour Bridge and the CBD can be seen. It is accessible by stairs from Macquarie Street, or a lift near Circular Quay railway station. The walkway connects with the Sydney Harbour Bridge walkway. Transport for NSW offers tickets to view the New Year's Eve fireworks from the Cahill Expressway deck through a competition.

Former The Sydney Morning Herald writer Elizabeth Farrelly described the freeway as 'doggedly symmetrical, profoundly deadpan, severing the city from the water on a permanent basis'. The sunken section of the expressway runs between the Royal Botanical Gardens and The Domain, key green spaces in Sydney. The Botanic Gardens Trust described the expressway as destroying the spatial relationship between the two.

== History ==
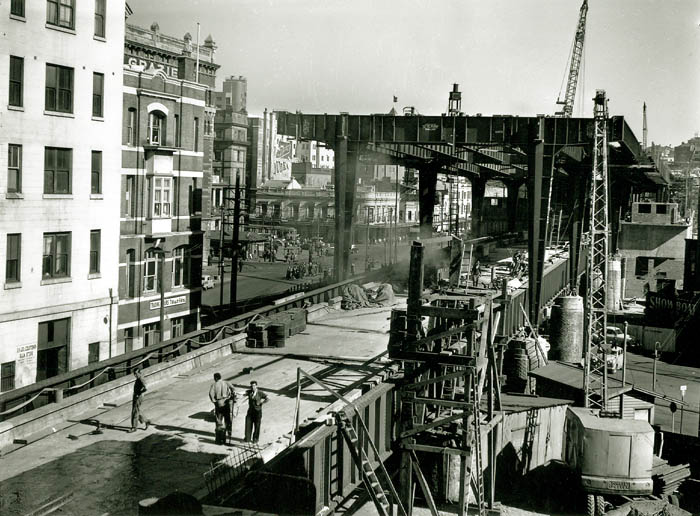
Construction in 1955. The expressway utilises the upper deck seen, the lower deck is used by trains on the City Circle

The expressway was first proposed in 1945 as part of an overall expressway plan for Sydney. Public opposition began when the proposal was first made public in 1948, with the Quay Planning Protest Committee being formed. Despite the opposition, construction on the elevated section of the expressway went ahead in 1955. Funding was provided by the Sydney Council and the NSW Government, and the elevated section was opened on 24 March 1958. Work on the second section, from Conservatorium Place through the Domain Tunnel to Cowper Wharf Road commenced almost straight away after that, and the additional section was opened on 1 March 1962.

The passing of the Main Roads Act 1924 through the Parliament of New South Wales provided for the declaration of roads as state highways, trunk roads and ordinary main roads. Roads proclaimed as main roads were partially funded by the State government through the Main Roads Board (later the Department of Main Roads, and eventually Transport for NSW). Under the subsequent Main Roads (Amendment) Act 1929 to provide for additional declarations of State Highways and Trunk Roads, the Department of Main Roads (which succeeded the MRB in 1932) proclaimed Main Road 592 along Cahill Expressway, from the western boundary of Macquarie Street (i.e., the eastern end of the elevated section) to the junction with Sir John Young Crescent in Woolloomooloo, on 2 December 1964; this was extended west along the elevated section across Circular Quay to meet Bradfield Highway at Millers Point (and also extended south along Sir John Young Crescent, Bourke, Crown and Campbell Streets to Oxford Street at Darlinghurst) on 22 January 1993. The southeastern end of Main Road 592 was truncated to its current terminus at Woolloomooloo on 8 August 2003. Despite its role as a grade-separated expressway, the road is not officially gazetted as one by Transport for NSW, and is still considered today to be a main road.

The passing of the Roads Act of 1993 updated road classifications and the way they could be declared within New South Wales. Under this act, the Cahill Expressway retains its designation as Main Road 592.

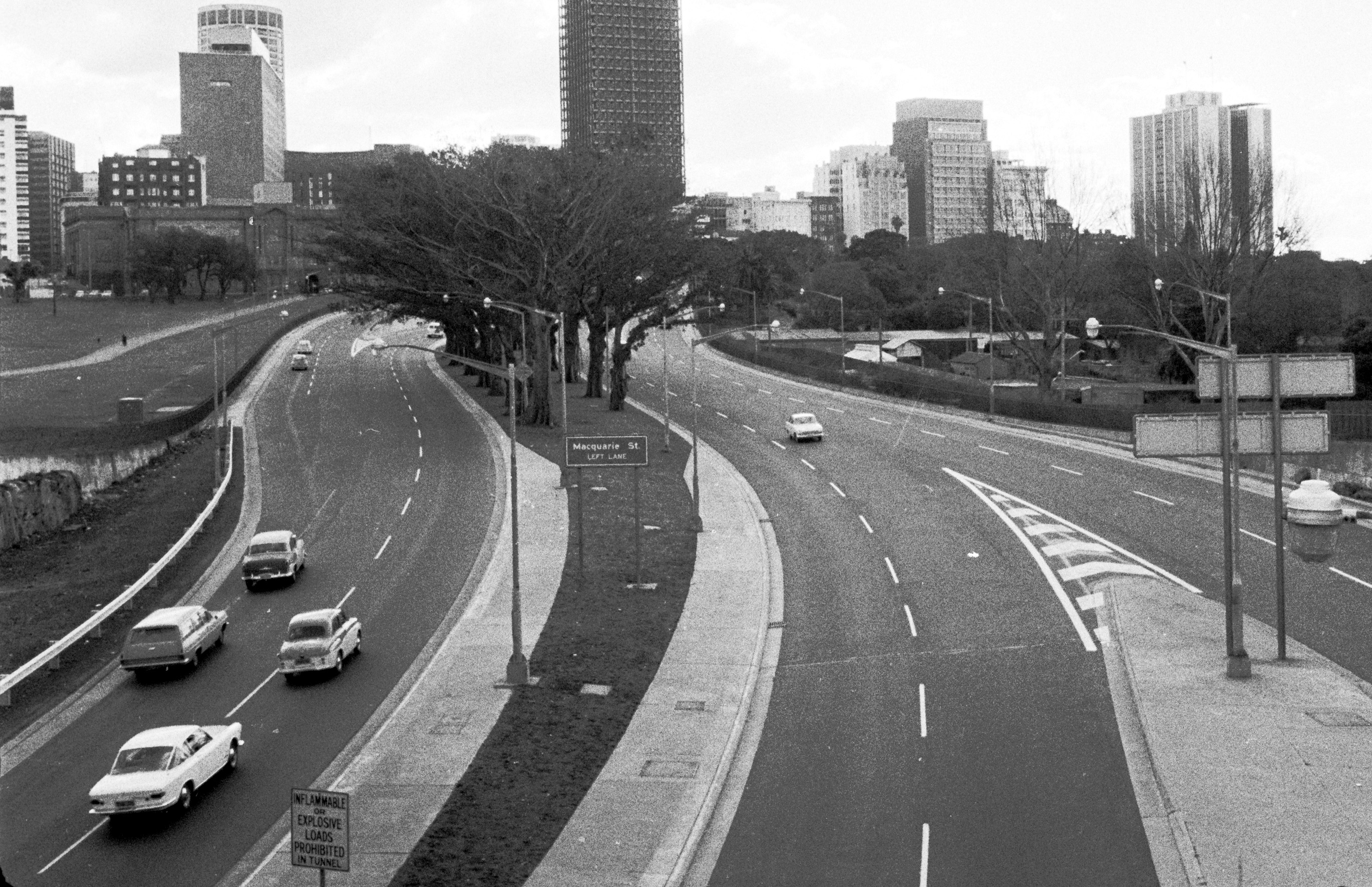
Looking northwest from Art Gallery Road, 1968

The Cahill Expressway was signposted as part of National Route 1 from its southeastern end to the interchange with the Sydney Harbour Tunnel, when the latter opened in 1992; this was replaced with Metroad 1 in 1993. With the conversion to the newer alphanumeric system in 2013, Metroad 1 was replaced by route M1.

As part of the Eastern Distributor works in the late 1990s, a landscaped canopy was built over the southeastern end of the Cahill Expressway (where it meets the Eastern Distributor) near the Art Gallery of New South Wales.

In June 2013, the expressway was temporarily renamed Tim Cahill Expressway in honour of Socceroo Tim Cahill, ahead of the Socceroos' 2014 FIFA World Cup qualification match against Iraq.

Since 2022, Ventia has operated the Domain Tunnel on behalf of Transport for NSW.

Historically, the land where the Expressway's southern entry opening (cut and roadway) is situated was in the 19th century part of the Inner Domain. In 1869 this area was used as a playing oval for two football games between Sydney University students and the crew of HMS Rosario which was anchored at Farm Cove. In 1870 members of the newly formed Wallaroo Football Club (rugby union) used the area as a training field. The western portion of this open space survives today as the narrow sliver of parkland situated directly across from 89 to 119 Macquarie Street.

== Removal and Modification Proposals ==
Since even before its construction, the elevated section of the expressway has faced public animosity for its visual impacts on Circular Quay. As such, a number of proposals have been made for its removal or modification.

In 1994, Prime Minister Paul Keating offered federal funds in the amount of $150 million toward the demolition of the expressway. Then-Premier, John Fahey, rejected the proposal because of the cost and the resultant traffic problems.

The Environmental Infrastructure Statement of the Sydney Harbour Tunnel stated that the proposed tunnel would include provision for a future exit to Macquarie Street and an entrance from Macquarie Street "should the Cahill Expressway ever be dismantled". The expressway was not planned to be dismantled at the time; it was claimed continued existence of the road would allow for removal of 15,000 vehicles per day from city streets.

In 2022, the State Coalition government revealed $216 million plans to redevelop Circular Quay, with part of the Cahill Eexpressway modified into a linear park, inspired by New York's High Line. Then-Premier Dominic Perrottet referred to the elevated structure as a 'scar', but ruled out demolition. In response, the City of Sydney called for the government to fully remove the elevated structure to create a new public square. Lord Mayor Clover Moore's proposal sees the expressway removed once the Western Harbour Tunnel is completed, followed by the relocation of the railway underground. Following the 2023 state election, the newly elected Labor government scaled down redevelopment plans, cancelling any changes to the expressway.

== Jeffrey Smart painting ==
One of Australian artist Jeffrey Smart's most famous works is Cahill Expressway (1962). The painting shows a stylised view of the Cahill Expressway tunnel and approach road, with a single man shown at the side of the image. The painting shows the alienation many feel when faced with the infrastructure of large freeways, especially when closely juxtaposed with pedestrian-scale areas.

== Exits and interchanges ==
The Cahill Expressway is entirely contained within the City of Sydney local government area.

Location	km	mi	Destinations	Notes
Millers Point	0.0	0.0	Bradfield Highway – North Sydney, Lane Cove	Northwestern terminus of expressway at partial trumpet interchange Entrance and exit north to the Bradfield Highway only, no access south to Western Distributor
Sydney	1.1	0.68	Sydney Harbour Tunnel (M1) – North Sydney, Lane Cove	Southbound entrance and northbound exit only, route M1 continues south along the Cahill Expressway
Sydney	1.2	0.75	Conservatorium Road – Sydney CBD	Northbound entrance and southbound exit only, no access to Sydney Harbour Tunnel
Sydney	1.2– 1.6	0.75– 0.99	Domain Tunnel	
Sydney	1.4	0.87	Shakespeare Place – Sydney CBD	Southbound entrance only
Sydney	1.7	1.1	Sir John Young Crescent (north) – Woolloomooloo	Northbound entrance only
Woolloomooloo	2.1	1.3	Cowper Wharf Road (east) – Woolloomooloo, Potts Point; Sir John Young Crescent (south) – Woolloomooloo, Darlinghurst	Northbound entrance and southbound exit only
Woolloomooloo	2.1	1.3	Eastern Distributor (M1) – Wollongong, Canberra	Southwestern terminus of expressway, route M1 continues south along Eastern Distributor
1.000 mi = 1.609 km; 1.000 km = 0.621 mi: Incomplete access; Route transition

== See also ==
- Freeways in Australia
- Freeways in Sydney
