= Cyberspace 3000 =

- Cover to Issue #8.

Publication information
- Publisher: Marvel UK
- Schedule: Monthly
- Format: Ongoing series
- Publication date: July 1993 - February 1994
- No. of issues: 8
- Main character(s): Captain Jennifer Cabre-Rios; Shan O'Meara; Commander Yan Onanwro; Doctor S'Rell; Dark Angel

Creative team
- Written by: Gary Russell
- Penciller: Steve Tappin
- Inker: Michael Eve
- Colorist: Paul Schroder

Cyberspace 3000 is a comic book that was published by the Marvel UK imprint of Marvel Comics from 1993 to 1994. The series follows the adventures of the 31st century spaceship Sol III, which has fled Earth with a cargo of refugees.

Although the series is mostly science fiction, it is also tied to the Marvel Universe and occasionally features appearances by established Marvel characters such as Galactus, the Silver Surfer and Adam Warlock, as well as a version of the Marvel UK heroine Dark Angel.

== Plot ==
The premise of Cyberspace 3000 is closely linked to another Marvel series, the Guardians of the Galaxy, with the Sol III ship fleeing an invasion by the alien Badoon. This connection is emphasized by references to related characters appearing in some characters dialogue - crewmembers swear "by Korvac's mother" and also "thank Korvac" for a lucky escape.

=== Characters ===
- Captain Jennifer Cabre-Rios
- Shan O'Meara
- Commander Yan Onanwro
- Doctor S'Rell
- Sol, the onboard computer system. Described as a 'Mark IV' A.I. system.
- The Clan Cyorse, a fanatical religious order.
- The Trilexia, an insectoid alien race
