= Tappin =

Tappin is a surname that may refer to:

- Arturo Tappin (contemporary), Barbadian jazz/reggae saxophonist
- Ashley Tappin (born 1974), American college and Olympic swimmer
- Christopher Tappin (born 1947), a retired British businessman extradited to the US
- Mark Tappin, half of the album-cover design team of Tappin Gofton
- Michael Tappin (born 1946), British academic, author and politician; member of the European Parliament
- Oliver Tappin (1893–1945), American politician; mayor of Flint, Michigan 1940
- Ryan Tappin (born 1986), Bahamian cricketer
- Steve Tappin (born 1966), British business consultant and author
