= WestConnex =

Australian motorway construction project

WestConnex New South Wales
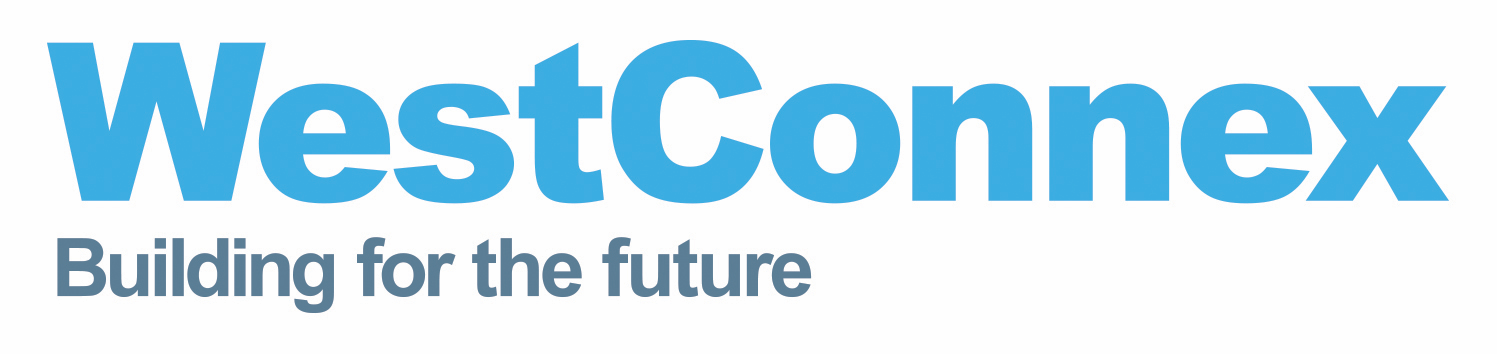

General information
- Type: Motorway
- Length: 33 km (21 mi)
- Opened: 20 December 2016: King Georges Road interchange upgrade 15 July 2017: M4 widening 13 July 2019: M4 East; 5 July 2020: M8 Motorway; 20 January 2023: M4–M8 Link Tunnels; 26 November 2023: Rozelle Interchange, Iron Cove Link

Major junctions
- North West end: M4 Western Motorway; Homebush, Sydney
- Concord Road; City West Link; Victoria Road; Western Distributor; Gardeners Road; Sydney Gateway
- South West end: M5 East Motorway; Kingsgrove, Sydney

Highway system
- Highways in Australia; National Highway • Freeways in Australia; Highways in New South Wales

WestConnex in Sydney, Australia is the largest and longest road tunnel in Australia, with a length of 22 km. A joint project of the New South Wales and Australian federal governments, the motorway scheme created around 33 kilometres (21 mi) motorway with 6-10 lanes between Homebush and Kingsgrove, passing underneath Inner West suburbs including Haberfield and St Peters. The first of the tunnels, the M4 East, opened to traffic in July 2019. The second of the tunnels, the M8 Motorway, opened to traffic a year later in July 2020. The third of the tunnels which extend the M4 and M8 opened to traffic in January 2023. The final component of the scheme, the Rozelle Interchange, opened to traffic in November 2023.

The forecast cost of WestConnex has grown from A$10 billion to over $45 billion. Once land acquisitions, network extensions development costs and the cost of operations are accounted for, the total cost is forecast to be at least $20 billion and possibly as much as $45 billion. In August 2018, the NSW government sold 51 percent of WestConnex to a consortium led by Transurban for A$9.26 billion.

The project has bipartisan political support from the Coalition and Labor parties, at both a federal and state level. Described as "the biggest transport project in Sydney and Australia since the Harbour Bridge" and costing "in current dollars, double the Snowy Mountains Scheme", the project has been criticised on economic, social and process grounds and has been the subject of public protest. It has faced opposition from residents, pro-public transport groups, anti-toll groups, and councillors from impacted suburbs, including the Lord Mayor of Sydney Clover Moore, and the Greens. In June 2017, the City of Sydney called on the government to abandon the third and final stage of the project.

== Staging ==
Works on the WestConnex are split up into three stages:

- Stage 1
  - M4 Western Motorway (M4) widening – completed in July 2017
  - M4 East, also known as New M4, an eastern extension of the M4 – completed in July 2019
- Stage 2
  - M5 Interchange at King Georges Road (King Georges Road Interchange) upgrade – completed in December 2016
  - M8 Tunnel (formerly the New M5), including St Peters Interchange – completed in July 2020
- Stage 3
  - M4–M8 Link (formerly the M4–M5 Link), a new inner western bypass of the Sydney CBD connecting the M4 and M8 (formerly the New M5) – completed in January 2023
  - Rozelle Interchange – completed in November 2023
  - Iron Cove Link – completed in November 2023

The Sydney Gateway project, now separate to the WestConnex project, was initially planned to be constructed and completed at the same time as the M4–M8 extensions. The Sydney Gateway's targeted opening date has since been pushed back one year to late 2024.

=== Stage 1: M4 Widening and M4 East ===
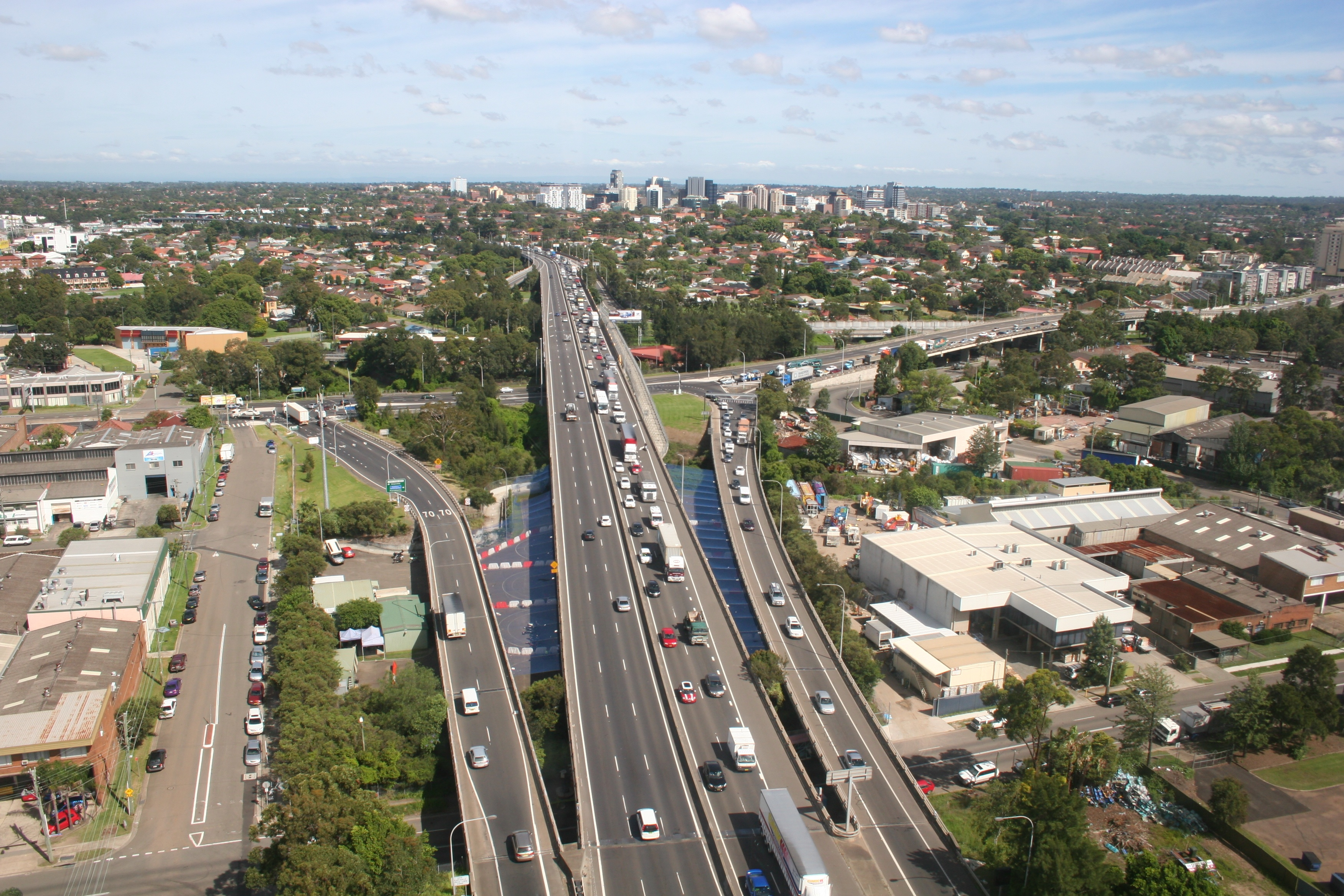
The M4 Western Motorway outside of Parramatta before construction. This section has since been widened as part of the WestConnex scheme.

Stage 1 works included widening of the existing M4 Western Motorway from two or three to four lanes in each direction between Parramatta and Homebush Bay Drive; and the M4 East, new twin three-lane motorway tunnels between Homebush and Haberfield, connecting to the City West Link.

A Road Network Performance Mitigation Plan (RNPMP) was developed as required by State Significant Infrastructure Instrument of Approval Condition B15. The purpose of this plan was to manage the traffic impact of the project on the adjacent road network, such as induced traffic.

The widening of the 7.5 kilometres (4.7 mi) M4 section east of Church Street, Parramatta, began construction in March 2015 and was completed in July 2017. WestConnex tolls were introduced on this section one month later on 15 August 2017.

The M4 East began construction in mid-2016 and opened on 13 July 2019. The M4 East was delivered by a Leighton Contractors, Samsung and John Holland joint venture.

=== Stage 2: King Georges Road Interchange, M8 Tunnel and St Peters Interchange ===
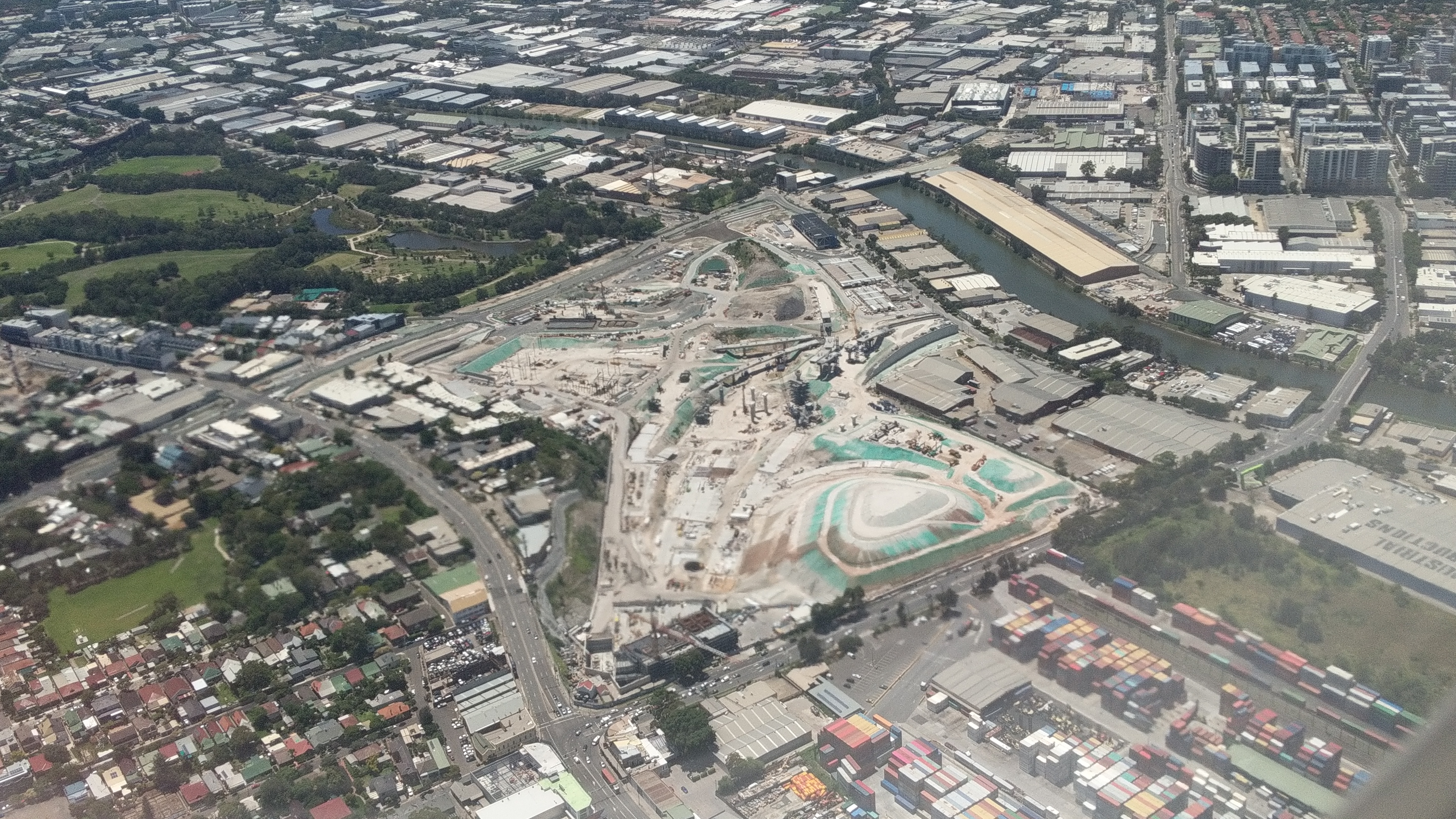
St Peters Interchange under construction

Stage 2 works included upgrading the existing M5 interchange at King Georges Road, and building the new M8 Motorway, a new set of tunnels between the M5 at Beverly Hills and St Peters. The M8, known as the New M5 during the planning and construction, was also designed to allow for future connection to the proposed M6 Motorway.

The King Georges Road Interchange Upgrade began construction in July 2015 and was open to traffic in December 2016.

The St Peters Interchange, located at the eastern end of the M8, is a viaduct road interchange that connects the WestConnex with local arterial roads such as Euston Road and Gardeners Road. It will also connect to the Sydney Gateway towards Sydney Airport. Recreational spaces are supposed to be provided surrounding the interchange. Additionally, Campbell Street and Campbell Road in St Peters was widened and extended eastwards over Alexandra Canal and link with Bourke Road in Mascot. A recreation parkland was built alongside the alignment of Campbell Street.

The M8, St Peters Interchange, and Campbell Road works started construction in mid-2016. The Campbell Road extension and the bridge over Alexandra Canal (Campbell Road Bridge) opened on 22 June 2020, and the M8 and the St Peters Interchange opened two weeks later on 5 July 2020. The M5 East Motorway also became tolled when the M8 opened, after being toll-free for 19 years since its opening in 2001. Prior to the toll, WestConnex had already taken over the operations and maintenance of the M5 East tunnels on 1 May 2020.

=== Stage 3: M4–M8 Link, Iron Cove Link and Rozelle Interchange ===
Stage 3 works include building a new motorway tunnel (formerly known as M4-M5 Link) linking the M4 East and the M8; the Rozelle Interchange, an underground interchange at the site of Rozelle rail yards with direct connections to the Anzac Bridge; and Iron Cove Link, a one kilometre (0.62 mi) tunnel from the Rozelle Interchange to Iron Cove Bridge bypassing the congested Victoria Road corridor. In September 2022, it was announced that the M4–M5 Link would be renamed to extensions of the M4 and M8 when operational.

Stage 3 was officially approved in April 2018, began construction in 2019. In February 2021, roadheaders carved from the M4-M5 Link tunnels into the M8 tunnel, connecting the two stages of the WestConnex project for the first time. The main tunnels extending the M4 and M8 opened on 20 January 2023, while the rest of Stage 3 opened on 26 November 2023. Construction of Rozelle Interchange and Iron Cove Link was directly managed by Transport for NSW instead of WestConnex.

The Rozelle Interchange was built to have future provision for the proposed Western Harbour Tunnel.

Unlike the bulk of the WestConnex projects, the Iron Cove Link is toll-free.

Stage 3 forms the southern section of an eventual Inner West bypass of Sydney's CBD. This stage also originally included Sydney Gateway, however the project is now a separate Transport for NSW project and is no longer part of the WestConnex scope. The Sydney Gateway, which connects to the St Peters interchange, will be completed in 2024 instead.

== History ==
The first comprehensive plan for Sydney motorways, the Cumberland County Plan, was released by the then county council in 1948 and adopted in 1951 by the NSW Government. The Plan envisaged a radial motorway network centred on Sydney's CBD. Though construction of the roads progressed slowly – by 1971 only isolated sections were complete – the Plan ensured corridors were reserved, providing property owners with certainty about future infrastructure.

This changed in 1976 with the election of the Australian Labor Party under Premier Neville Wran. Wran, faced with his predecessors' ambitious infrastructure plans, inner-city opposition to motorway projects (including a powerful 'Green Bans' movement) and a deteriorating financial situation, halted work on inner-city projects, scaled back the under-construction Eastern Suburbs railway line and eliminated a number of the Cumberland Plan's inner-city road reservations.

Though Wran's decision to sell off the M4 East corridor was later criticised, the Cumberland Plan's radial concept was anyway beginning to lose relevance. The city's passenger and freight gateway had shifted 14 kilometres (8.7 mi) south of the CBD, with long-distance passengers increasingly arriving via Sydney Airport, not Circular Quay or Central station; and Port Botany increasingly supplanting Sydney Harbour as the city's main shipping hub. At the same time, employment was decentralising. Retailers were clustering in new suburban shopping malls; factories were moving to less constrained greenfield sites in the outer suburbs; and many companies were moving to suburban campus-style office parks.

In 1987, the then Department of Main Roads released Roads 2000, which shifted the focus of motorway planning from completing the CBD-centric radial system and addressed the growing number of cross-suburban vehicle journeys instead. The Western Motorway, now known as the M4, was completed from Lapstone to Concord in 1992. The South-Western motorway, known as the M5, reached from Prestons to Beverly Hills by 1995.

The unfinished M5 East section of the orbital, between Beverly Hills and the airport, remained contentious. Although a surface corridor had been reserved for much of the route, the Labor government of Bob Carr was anxious to minimise the surface impact. After last-minute revisions to the design, the resulting motorway, opened in 2001, was too steep for laden trucks returning from Port Botany, significantly increasing vehicle emissions and frequently overwhelming the ventilation system.

The WestConnex plans for the widened Campbell Street bridge over the canal to Alexandria used part of the Johnstons Creek Route corridor.

=== Labor proposals in the 2000s ===
2010 map of proposed Sydney inner west motorway tunnels

The Labor government proposed a number of schemes in the 2000s.

==== M4 East ====
In July 2002, the M4 East scheme was proposed with three options:

- short tunnel option: a 3.6-kilometre (2.2 mi) tunnel between the M4 at Concord and City West Link and Parramatta Road at Haberfield
- long tunnel option: a 6.5-kilometre (4.0 mi) tunnel between the M4 at Concord and City West Link at Lilyfield
- slot option: a sunken trench road similar to the Eastern Distributor, between the M4 at Concord and Parramatta Road at Haberfield

All three options would run below or parallel to Parramatta Road and/or City West Link. The short tunnel option was preferred for having lower costs both during construction and operation. The long tunnel option was considered to have the potential to increase congestion on the approaches to Anzac Bridge, causing eastbound queues to extend into the tunnels. The slot option could be constructed at a similar cost to the short tunnel, however, it was considered to not provide the same level of traffic benefits as the short tunnel option. Additionally, the option would need to acquire additional properties and the construction period for this option would be longer.

Between 2003 and 2004, the preferred short tunnel option for M4 East was exhibited. The preferred option would also widen the existing motorway between Homebush Bay Drive and Concord Road. Members of the government were divided over the M4 East proposal and ultimately did not proceed with it in early 2005 due to community opposition. The preferred option eventually formed the basis of the concept design for the M4 East project of the WestConnex.

Despite the M4 East and Marrickville Tunnel not eventuating, the government continued to develop the schemes. In October 2007, the government was considering a '3-in-1' tolled motorway being dubbed the Gateway. The proposal was estimated to cost at least $7 billion, and would be funded by a proposed retail sale of electricity. The three motorway sections that make up the proposal were:

- The first section would head north and connect to Victoria Road, possibly around Iron Cove bridge
- The second section would extend the M4 to the city CBD via the Anzac Bridge
- The third section would link the M4 to the Airport through a 5 km tunnel (similar to the Marrickville Tunnel)

The government continued to develop the schemes secretly in 2009, with funding to be provided by the federal Labor government. The M4 East failed to receive funding in the 2009/10 federal budget.

==== Marrickville Tunnel ====
Also in 2004, the Marrickville Tunnel scheme between the M4 East and Mascot was being considered by the government. It was also known as Marrickville Truck Tunnel, Marrickville Motorway Tunnel or the M4 airport truck tunnel. It aimed to provide a direct route for traffic between Port Botany, Sydney Airport and South Sydney. One option considered for this scheme was a truck-only tunnel for freight access between the port and airport to north-western Sydney. The tunnel would run under Sydenham Road and connect Parramatta Road in Lewisham to the Princes Highway at St Peters. The scheme did not progress and was never placed on public display. The concept of the scheme was later developed to become the M4–M5 Link project (and later the M4–M8 extensions) of the WestConnex.

==== Inner West Motorway ====
In March 2007, prior to the state election later that month, The Daily Telegraph claimed the government was planning the Inner West Motorway, which was similar to the Marrickville Tunnel. It would be a tunnel which would run from St Peters underneath Enmore, Stanmore, Camperdown and Annandale to City West Link and Victoria Road. This claim was dismissed by the government.

In 2010, a report by consultancy Evans & Peck proposed the Inner West Bypass which followed a similar route. The bypass was estimated to have a $12 billion price tag, and would require four to five ventilation stacks. Under the proposal, the bypass would connect to another tunnel that would follow the alignments of Victoria Road and the cancelled Lane Cove Valley Expressway, joining the M2 Hills Motorway at Lane Cove. From there, another tunnel would follow the alignment of Pacific Highway and join the F3 Sydney–Newcastle Freeway.

==== M5 duplication ====
In 2009, the government released the M5 Transport Corridor Feasibility Study, which investigated strategic options for improving the M5 Motorway corridor. The study identified a preliminary preferred option, being the M5 East Duplication, consisted of duplicating the M5 East and construction of a new connection from the M5 East at Arncliffe to Euston Road, Qantas Drive and Gardeners Road. The strategic concept for the M5 East Duplication was placed on public exhibition between November 2009 and March 2010 for community and stakeholder feedback. Feedback received was used to further develop and refine the scheme to become the King Georges Road Interchange Upgrade and New M5 projects of the WestConnex.

=== Coalition proposal in the 2010s ===
==== 2012 "First things first" strategy ====
Elected in 2011 on a promise to create an integrated transport strategy for the city, the Coalition government of Premier Barry O'Farrell established an independent advisory body, led by former premier Nick Greiner, to assess projects and determine priorities. Greiner's Infrastructure NSW (iNSW) evaluated a number of long-standing motorway proposals, including the M4 East, the F6 extension (now called the M6) and the M2-F3 link (later called NorthConnex). iNSW released its strategy, entitled First Things First: the state infrastructure strategy 2012–2032 , the following year. The plan identified a 33-kilometre (21 mi) motorway, which it named "WestConnex", as the state's top road priority. The creation of WestConnex was one of the major points of agreement between two competing strategic transport reports, commissioned simultaneously in 2011 by the NSW Government, from iNSW and Transport for NSW. O'Farrell accepted the recommendation, committing $1.8 billion to begin work.

The initial scheme called for:

- widening of the existing M4 between Parramatta and Homebush, especially at James Ruse Drive
- eastern extension of the M4 to Camperdown
- a tunnel (later the "M4 South" or "M4-M5 Link") from Camperdown to St Peters for access to Port Botany and Sydney Airport
- widening of the existing M5 East
- improvements to surface roads around the port and airport

The tunnel from the M4 to St Peters component would provide the first step towards an inner-city bypass, which was originally planned to connect the airport to the Victoria Road corridor. Transport for NSW, which released its long-term integrated transport plan around the same time, committed to further planning work on the northern section of the bypass. iNSW estimated the benefit-cost ratio for WestConnex at "more than 1.5", noting that the removal of freight traffic from Parramatta Road could also facilitate urban regeneration along the Inner West's main road link.

Focused as it was on journeys to and from the international gateways at Botany Bay, the scheme did not include a direct connection to the CBD. This proved a stumbling block in securing federal funding for the project, despite the risk of a motorway direct to the city competing with existing public transport services. With a change of government in 2013, the federal government's opposition was reversed.

==== 2013 State Significant Infrastructure Application Report ====
By November 2013, the WestConnex was divided into three stages:

- Stage 1(a): M4 Widening, between Church Street, Parramatta to Homebush Bay Drive
- Stage 1(b) M4 East, extending the M4 to Parramatta Road and City West Link at Haberfield
- Stage 2: M5 East Airport Link, between King Georges Road and St Peters
- Stage 3: M4 South, between Haberfield and St Peters via Camperdown

=== Later modifications ===
The scheme underwent a number of changes from the concept recommended by iNSW in 2012, in particular to the M4-M5 Link.

In late 2014, the government realigned the M4-M5 Link to accommodate a link to a future second harbour road tunnel, with a view to one day completing an inner-city bypass. This would mean a large interchange at the site of the abandoned Rozelle Rail Yards close to the Anzac Bridge. The interchange, now known as Rozelle Interchange, was later moved underground with a large park to be built above the interchange. Additionally, a tunnel under Rozelle was added to bypass the congested Victoria Road corridor and connect with the Rozelle Yard interchange. On 9 November 2016, a new route for the M4-M5 Link took it under Annandale and the Hunter Baillie Memorial Presbyterian Church. An interchange with Parramatta Road at Camperdown was also removed. On 17 November 2016, it was confirmed that the mid-tunnel point would be in "the 'triangle area' bordered by Parramatta Road, Pyrmont Bridge Road and Mallet Street".

Stub tunnels were added to the New M5 to connect to a proposed F6 extension to the St George and Sutherland Shire areas. The proposed F6 extension is now known as M6 Motorway.

In August 2019, the right turn from The Crescent northbound to eastbound was also proposed to be modified to an overpass, with changes to surrounding pedestrian and cycling links and the layouts of surrounding intersections. The modification was approved on 30 September 2020.

== Objectives ==
The strategic objectives that the scheme was originally conceived to address have never been made public. The initial application for federal funding was made under the 'National Freight Network' category, and the new tunnels converge near Sydney's main container port (Port Botany) and airport. This suggests the primary objective was to improve road freight productivity. However, smaller truck-only toll tunnels would not have been financially viable. Therefore, general use toll tunnels were proposed instead, to generate toll revenue from passenger vehicles as well. This approach was described as "suburban motorists ... paying for an inner-city freight project".

A list of objectives was included in the 2015 Business Case. However, the Business Case and list of objectives were written retrospectively, long after state and federal funding for the project was announced.

Infrastructure Australia criticised the NSW Government for not adequately appraising alternative ways of meeting the project objectives. For example, road freight productivity could be improved, and congestion reduced, simply by tolling the existing M4 and M5 motorways, which is being done anyway to cross-subsidise to the new tunnels.

== Benefits ==
The 2015 business case predicted WestConnex will deliver $22.2 billion in benefits, before deducting operating expenses. These benefits were mostly non-cash, estimates of the value to users of such things as travel time saved ($12.9 billion) and increased travel time reliability ($1.47 billion) as well as reduced operating costs ($6.18 billion). All other factors were estimated to have a worth of $1.65 billion.

The 2015 business case estimated that building WestConnex will enable an extra 45,000 road trips per weekday by 2031. By 2031, Infrastructure Australia estimates that the population of Sydney will have grown by an extra 1.2 million people.

For the purpose of calculating benefits and costs of the scheme, tolling was considered to be "a transfer payment from the user to operator", the benefit to the operator is considered to cancel out the disbenefit to the user, and as such, tolling has a "neutral effect on overall benefits and costs".

== Community feedback ==
=== Support ===
WestConnex was supported by the state and the federal Liberal Party governments, including former Premier Gladys Berejiklian and former Prime Minister Malcolm Turnbull. Both levels of government continually funded the planning and implementation of the WestConnex.

WestConnex was also supported by the state and federal Labor parties, whether in opposition or in government. When the project was first announced in 2012, Anthony Albanese, the federal shadow infrastructure and transport minister, voiced his support of the project and announced over $1.2 billion in funding despite the motorway impacting on residents in his electorate of Grayndler. The funding was also on the condition that no tolls were placed on old parts of the road (referring to the existing M4 and M5 East). Prior to the 2016 federal election, federal Labor and opposition leader Bill Shorten also promised that if elected, he would honour the $3.5 billion federal funding commitment made by the Turnbull government. Former state Labor leaders and opposition leaders Luke Foley and Michael Daley have also both voiced support of the project.

WestConnex also received support from multiple third party organisations, such as the motoring lobby group the NRMA, which argued that it would help improve transport in Sydney's west, significantly reduce travel times and complete a plan from 1947. On 3 October 2012, press releases in support of the "missing motorway" were issued by Infrastructure Partnerships Australia, Sydney Business Chamber, and the Sydney Airport Corporation. In December 2014, Lucy Turnbull said it was a unfortunate Parramatta Road had been separated from the project.

In 2015, the Committee for Sydney backed a 'well-integrated' WestConnex. This came after Tim Williams made comments calling out the WestConnex motorway as a poor solution to Sydney's traffic issues.

In 2016, Lucy Turnbull, the chief commissioner of the Greater Sydney Commission and wife of former Prime Minister Malcolm Turnbull, voiced her support for the project albeit with concerns for the preservation of heritage sites in Haberfield, stating that the development needs to "strike the right balance between protecting our homes and heritage and building a Greater Sydney that will work well for future generations".

=== Opposition ===
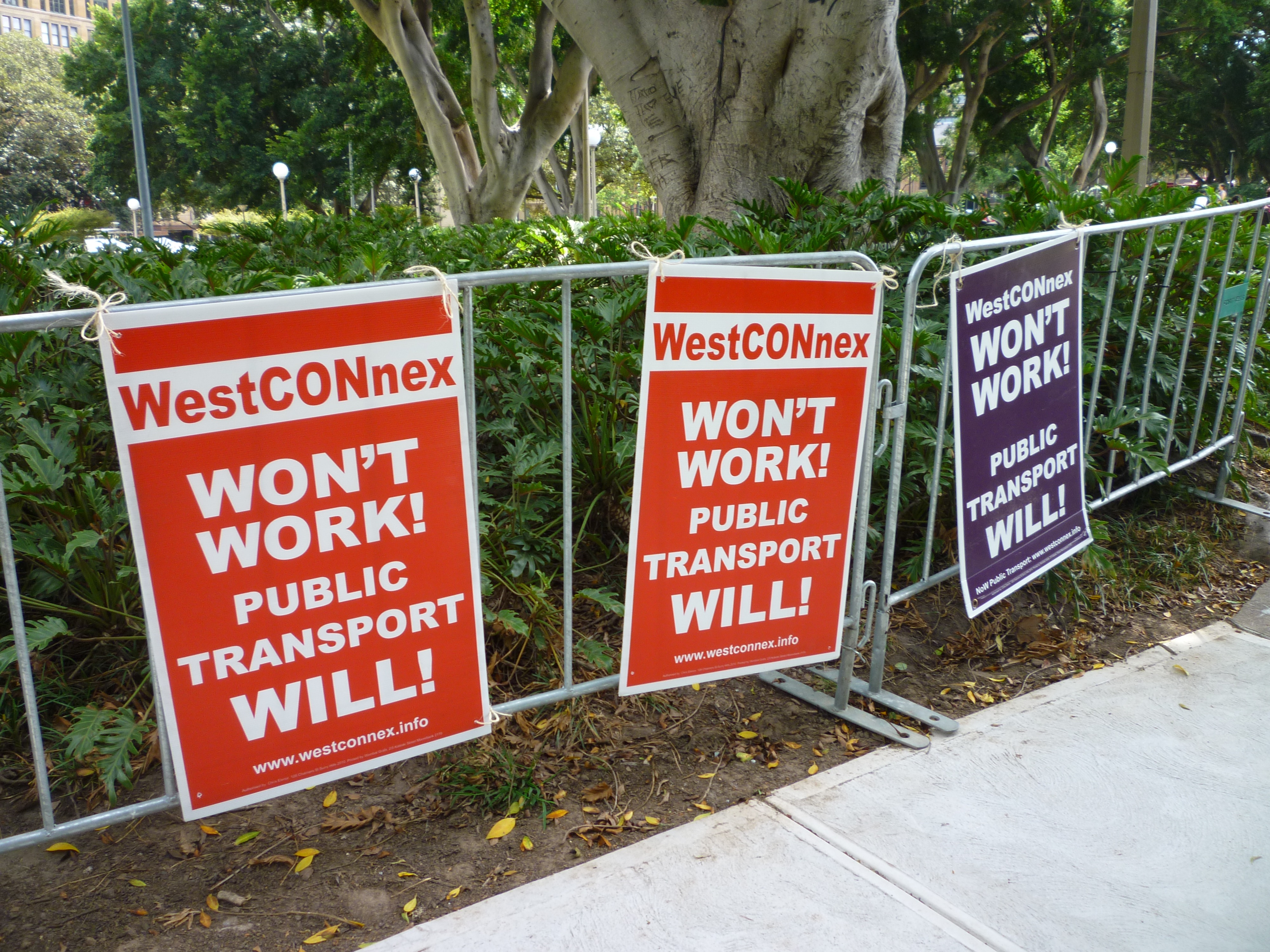
Protest sign accompanying public demonstration in Hyde Park, Sydney (March 2016)

Elements of the WestConnex scheme encountered strident opposition from a range of stakeholders, among them academics, architects, resident action groups, an industry group, local councils, a developer lobby, the Greens, with some strongly opposed to the project in its entirety. Among the project's most high-profile opponents has been Sydney Lord Mayor Clover Moore, who commissioned a report to Council on the project. Almost 12,900 submissions were lodged with NSW Planning in response to the environmental impact statement, many highly critical of the project. Marrickville Council told WestConnex it will not approve preliminary work until the project as a whole is approved, but observers note that the "scope of the project ... continues to expand", as does the cost.

==== Public transport ====
The Lord Mayor's report, released a month before the 2015 state election, criticised the project and recommended that a new railway line be built along the M4 Western Motorway and M4 East corridor instead, to parallel the existing Inner West Line. The impact of the project on public transport continued to be a matter of concern into 2016 with "no detail on what sort of public transport will be included on the road surface" and repeatedly expressed concerns that experience with motorways shows they generate traffic and increase congestion and that Westconnex will similarly add to congestion, rather than relieving it. The project is criticised as a "crude 1950s response to our complex 21st century transport needs".

==== Planning and approval processes ====
The planning and approval process for Stage 1A of the scheme (widening the M4) was criticised by Grant Hehir, the NSW Auditor-General, for failing to abide by the Government's own assurance arrangements for major projects. While Hehir made clear it was not his intention to assess the merit or value of the project per se, he identified "a number of deficiencies in governance and independent assurance over the early stages" and made recommendations for change.

In response to Hehir's recommendations, the RMS only committed to addressing them for "future more complex stages", leaving the governance arrangements for the current stages unaltered.

The methods by which the project's value, its cost and benefits as well as the fairness of their distribution have all been challenged. In particular, it is argued that the projections of the economic benefits brought by the project use modelling "...devised by highway agencies in the 1960s to justify the massive cost of urban motorways". The government, although "urged" to consider the fairness of the process of compulsory acquisition for the land required for the project and act on recommendations in a legal report to improve it, decided to take "no further action".

==== Environmental impacts ====
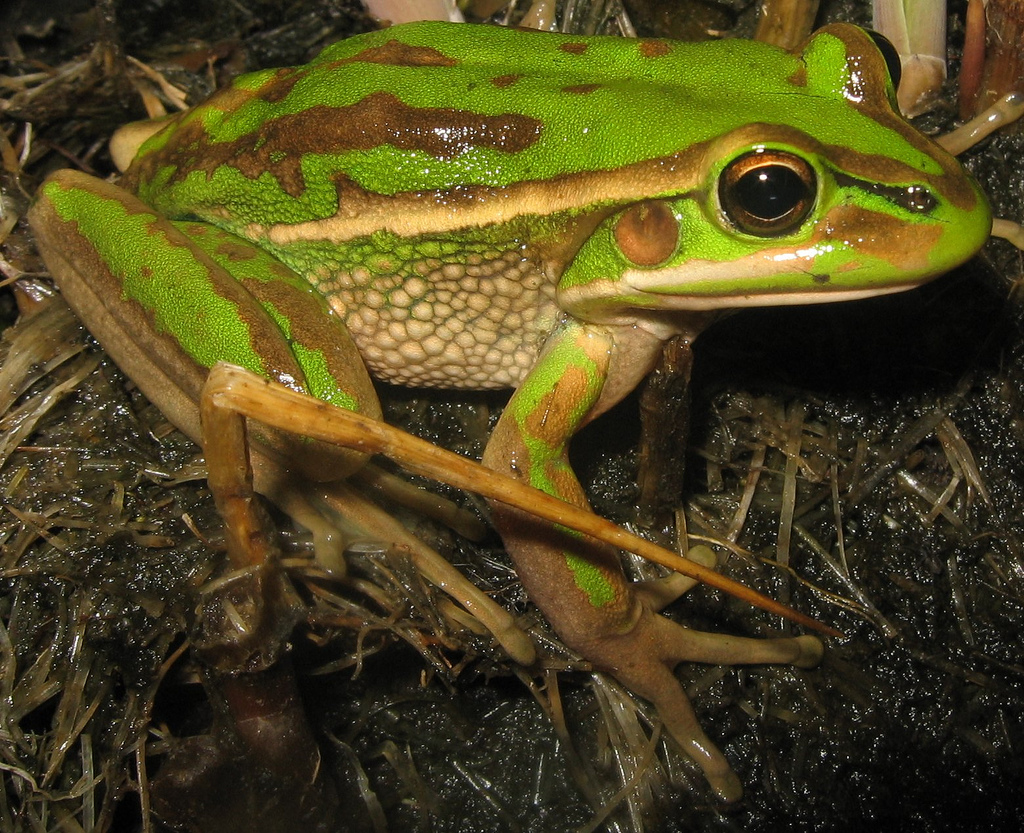
Green and golden bell frog, cause of criticism as a result of perceived threat to the species

The project has been criticised for its potential impact on the green and golden bell frog at Kogarah golf club. Protests have been strong against the felling of mature heritage trees in preparation for "the 40-hectare spaghetti interchange – as big as Sydney Park itself".

In January 2016, the Wolli Creek Preservation Society raised concerns that complying offsets are unlikely to be available for the irreparable damage to the Beverly Grove bushland from the temporary use of 1.4 hectares (3.5 acres) as a construction compound. The 1.87-hectare (4.6-acre) Beverly Grove bushland was one of the larger remnant patches of the Cooks River/Castlereagh Ironbark ecological community (CCRIF). Further, the 1.4 hectares (3.5 acres) of critically endangered CCRIF cleared was an offset from the original M5 East.

On 11 July 2016, the Second Turnbull Ministry announced the environmental approval for Stage 2 of the WestConnex motorway with a captive breeding plan and construction and maintenance of additional habitat for the green and golden bell frog and offsets for damage to the critically endangered CCRIF.

==== Heritage impacts ====
The destruction of heritage properties in Haberfield, a suburb listed in its entirety as a Conservation area, has been the subject of specific criticism, especially when the chair of the Greater Sydney Commission said she was unaware of it. The compulsorily acquisition of residential properties in inner-city suburbs for the project, including "at least 50 listed heritage buildings" has been the subject of much criticism and opposition on grounds of disruption, loss of heritage and unfairness of process, including the Government's decision to release only the executive summary of the project's business case.

==== Secrecy ====
After the WestConnex Authority was closed in October 2015, the project's transfer to the Sydney Motorway Corporation was criticised on the basis that this there were then no representatives from transport agencies on the board of the new "private corporation" and also that information about the project would no longer need to be disclosed in the same way that government entities normally did. A proposal in 2016 for an additional tunnel between Iron Cove Bridge and an interchange at Rozelle, required the acquisition of further residential properties. Residents whose homes were affected reportedly received letters about such acquisitions on the same day that the responsible Government Minister said final decisions on them "had yet to be made". The Russell Review of the acquisition system in 2012 had not been released by 2016.

== Funding ==
Funding uses a combination of government subsidy, tolls on new tunnel sections, and tolls on some existing motorways (M4, M5 East and M5 South-West). The finance was to mostly be loans from the private sector, with $2 to $3 billion worth of loans and grants from the State and Federal Governments. All loans are to be repaid by privatising each section as it is completed.

=== Tolls ===
The Government's tolling strategy is based on distance-based charging. Tolling on new sections of WestConnex (the M4 East, the M8 and the M4-M5 Link) will begin as each section opens. Tolling on the existing M4 (widened section between Parramatta and Homebush) began in August 2017. Tolling on the existing M5 East began in July 2020 when the M8 opened.

Once tolling on a section starts, the charge will consist of a flagfall plus a charge per kilometre, with a maximum charge, calculated as follows.

- The Base Toll Flag Fall is set at 2012 dollars and is $1.00, including GST.
- The Base Toll Rate is set at 2012 dollars and is $0.37 per kilometre, including GST.
- The Base Toll Cap is set at 2012 dollars and is $7.07, including GST.

For each elapsed year between 2012 and 2040, the toll will increase by 4% or the consumer price index (CPI) every year, whichever is greater, until 2040, after which CPI will apply. The toll concession for WestConnex expires in 2060. There is no discount for drivers also using a different toll road (such as Westlink M7 or M5 South-West). Tolls for heavy vehicles are triple of cars and motorcycles.

Toll prices as of 1 July 2025
Toll road	Class A toll prices (Note: Class A vehicles are typically cars and motorcycles; Class B vehicles are all other vehicles including trucks and heavy vehicles)			Class B toll prices	Toll increase	Toll concessionaire	Expiry of toll concession
Toll road	Flagfall	Charge per km	Toll cap	Class B toll prices	Toll increase	Toll concessionaire	Expiry of toll concession
WestConnex (M4, M5 East, M8)	$1.73	$0.6411	$12.25	3 x of Class A prices	Annually on 1 January, by the greater of CPI or 4% until December 2040, and then by positive CPI only	Sydney Transport Partners (9% Tawreed Investments 10.5% CPPIB, 10% Caisse de dépôt et placement du Québec (CDPQ), 20.5% Australian Super, 50% Transurban)	2060

The WestConnex toll cap ($11.11 as of 2023) was not available before January 2023, as there was no continuous section of the WestConnex long enough to warrant the toll cap. It became available from January 2023 when the M4-M8 Link opened, meaning all the main tunnel sections were connected continuously.

WestConnex tolling will be implemented on the M5 South-West from 2026, when the current concession is due to end.

=== Finance ===
By 2015, $1.5 billion has been raised from the private sector.

$7.1 billion has been provided by the State and Federal governments. The Federal government has contributed a grant of $1.5 billion, and committed to a concessional loan of $2.0 billion. The NSW Government initially planned to contribute $1.8 billion. It has since increased its contribution to $3.6 billion, of which $1.8 billion is from the 'Restart NSW' infrastructure fund and $1.8 billion is from the State's Consolidated Fund.

In August 2018, a consortium led by Transurban won the bidding to buy 51% of WestConnex for 9.3 billion. NSW Treasurer Dominic Perrottet said that 5.3 billion of that would be spent on delivering Stage 3. The Transurban consortium will contribute another 0.7 billion towards the cost of Stage 3, and the remainder of the cost is to be funded by borrowing.

By the end of State 3, the project is expected to be carrying $8.2 billion of debt.

In 2013, Julia Gillard, Prime Minister at the time, offered a grant of $1.8 billion which was rejected by then Premier O'Farrell, as a "stunt", because it came with three conditions not reimposing tolls on the existing M4 motorway even if it were widened; a direct connection to the Sydney city centre; and a direct connection to Port Botany. In particular, not tolling existing roads was not acceptable as it would deny the project billions of dollars in toll revenue. Following a change of federal government, incoming Prime Minister Tony Abbott approved a grant of $1.5 billion, followed by a loan of $2.0 billion.

=== Costs ===
When first proposed in 2012, the WestConnex was to cost approximately $10 billion. By 2015, direct costs were forecast to be $16.8 billion, with estimates that total costs could be up to $45 billion, or more.

The $16.8 billion figure originally including $800 million for the Airport Gateway. In August 2017, Premier Berejiklian announced the $16.8 billion, did not including the Airport Gateway. The cost of the Gateway had by then grown to $1.8 billion and has since grown to $2.6 billion.

The $16.8 billion figure does not include "land acquisition, network extensions, and development costs", or indirect costs such as alleged environmental damage and shortfalls between prices being paid for compulsory acquisitions and market values.

Land acquisition costs are known to be at least $1.5 billion. The cost of network extensions to support the WestConnex has never formally been disclosed and neither has the cost or nature of 'development costs'. Operating costs have been estimated at the equivalent of $1.465 billion.

Leaked documents show that contractors have lodged over $1 billion in claims for variations to contracts.

According to a report commissioned by the City of Sydney, once excluded factors are properly considered, the full cost of the project may be more than $45 billion.

=== Ownership ===
Under the original financing strategy the NSW was to retain ownership of WestConnex until 2025, so as to maximise the sales price.

On 12 May 2017, the NSW Government announced its intention to sell at least 51% of Sydney Motorway Corporation, the holding company for the WestConnex project. At the time, UBS estimated that the 51% stake might fetch between A$2 billion and A$4 billion. In August 2018, the 51% stake was sold for A$9.26 billion to Sydney Transport Partners (STP), a consortium led by Transurban (50%) and included AustralianSuper (20.5%), the Canada Pension Plan Investment Board (CPP Investments) (20.5%) and Tawreed Investments (9%). The NSW Government retained the other 49% of Sydney Motorway Corporation.

In March 2020, the NSW state government announced it would continue looking into selling its remaining 49% stake. Between January and June 2021, the 49% stake was auctioned in two tranches of equal 24.5% equity. In September 2021, it was announced that STP was announced as the winning bidder for both tranches and would acquire the government's 49% stake for A$11.1 billion. Caisse de dépôt et placement du Québec (CDPQ) also joined the STP consortium as part of the acquisition. The acquisition was finalised in October 2021, with STP fully owning WestConnex.

As of October 2021, the shareholder composition of WestConnex and STP is Transurban (50%), AustralianSuper (20.5%), CPP Investments (10.5%), CDPQ (10%) and Tawreed Investments (9%).

== Governance ==
Prior to October 2021, the WestConnex board was made up of an Independent Chairperson and directors from Sydney Transport Planners (STP) and the state government's representative shareholder, Roads Retained Interest Pty Ltd. Since STP's acquisition of the state government's share and the addition of Caisse de dépôt et placement du Québec (CDPQ) to the STP consortium in October 2021, the director from the state government's shareholder was replaced by a director from CDPQ.

== Audits and other inquiries ==
In 2014, the NSW Auditor-General, Grant Hehir at the time, conducted a performance assurance audit covering the period from the development of the concept in October 2012 through to the pre-tender phase for Stage 1 in March 2014 and concluded that:

In the period covered by this audit, the processes applied to WestConnex to provide independent assurance to [NSW] Government did not meet best practice standards. The agencies concerned adopted a number of good practice internal governance and assurance arrangements for WestConnex. However, the Government would have received greater assurance about the risks, costs and benefits of the project had these agencies devoted time and effort to also implementing the Major Projects Assurance Framework effectively as designed.

— Grant Hehir, NSW Auditor-General, 18 December 2014.

In May 2016, it was announced that the Federal Government decision to commit $3.5 billion to WestConnex project will be investigated by the Commonwealth Auditor-General. Hehir, who was now the Commonwealth Auditor-General, released his report on 14 February 2017 and was highly critical of upfront payments made by the Gillard and Abbott governments and an A$2 billion loan made in advance of scheduled milestones "did not adequately protect the Australian government's financial interests". The estimated cost to the Commonwealth Government of providing funding before it was needed was $20 million. Paul Fletcher, the federal Minister for Urban Affairs and Cities, claimed that the report was not critical of the project:

Nothing in this report raises any questions about WestConnex's design, the construction program, or the benefits that WestConnex will deliver to millions of people in western and southwestern Sydney—such as cutting travel time from Parramatta to Sydney Airport by 40 minutes.

— Paul Fletcher, Minister for Urban Affairs and Cities, 2017.

In October 2017 it was reported that Margaret Crawford, the new NSW Auditor-General, will conduct another audit of the WestConnex project. The audit, entitled WestConnex: Changes since 2014, will assess whether Transport for NSW and Infrastructure NSW effectively assessed and justified major scope changes to the WestConnex project since December 2014. The report is anticipated to be published in 2020.

=== NSW Legislative Council Public Accountability Committee Inquiry ===
On 21 June 2018 the NSW Legislative Council Public Accountability Committee established an Inquiry into the Impacts of WestConnex. On 17 December 2018 the Inquiry released its report which included the following findings:

- That the NSW Government failed to subject the WestConnex project to a comprehensive independent assurance process during the development of the first business case for the project.
- That the NSW Government was not required to consider the full range of costs in the business case for the WestConnex project, including costs to public health, amenity, biodiversity, extra road building, and losses to public transport.
- That the NSW Government failed to adequately consider alternative options at the commencement of the WestConnex project. This failure has undermined the justification for the project and has exacerbated community opposition.
- That the transparency arrangements pertaining to the WestConnex business case have been unsatisfactory.
- That the delivery of the WestConnex project by Sydney Motorway Corporation has weakened the accountability and disclosure rules that would have otherwise applied if the project had been delivered by a government agency, including the important provisions of the Government Information (Public Access) Act 2009.
- That the recent sale of a majority interest in Sydney Motorway Corporation to the private sector will likely exacerbate existing transparency and accountability concerns relating to the WestConnex project.
- It is unacceptable that members of the community feel it necessary to undertake air quality monitoring in lieu of the responsible government agencies.
- That the various noise mitigation measures offered by Roads and Maritime Services are wholly inadequate to substantially reduce heavy construction noise.
- Local government should not have to step in to alleviate concerns held by residents in relation to State Significant Infrastructure projects, such as the WestConnex, when it is the responsibility of the NSW Government.
- That while extensive consultation for the WestConnex project has been undertaken, it appears that this consultation has been ineffective and has lacked an empathetic approach.

== Responsibility ==
The WestConnex Delivery Authority (WDA) was a NSW Government agency established in November 2013 to plan and manage delivery of the WestConnex motorway scheme. WDA's functions had previously been performed by a project office within Roads & Maritime Services. WDA was established by the Transport Administration (General) Amendment (WestConnex Delivery Authority) Regulation 2013. Its founding chairman was businessman Tony Shepherd and its founding chief executive was Dennis Cliche. The Authority was merged into the Sydney Motorway Corporation in October 2015 with the Corporation responsible for all aspects of the project. Following the resignation of Shepherd, Peter Brecht became chair, with claims that information about the project is less available to the public since Brecht's appointment.

== See also ==
- Transport in Sydney in the 2010s
- East West Link, Melbourne
- Perth Freight Link
- NorthConnex
