= M8 Motorway (Sydney) =

Motorway in Sydney, New South Wales, Australia

M8 Motorway New South Wales

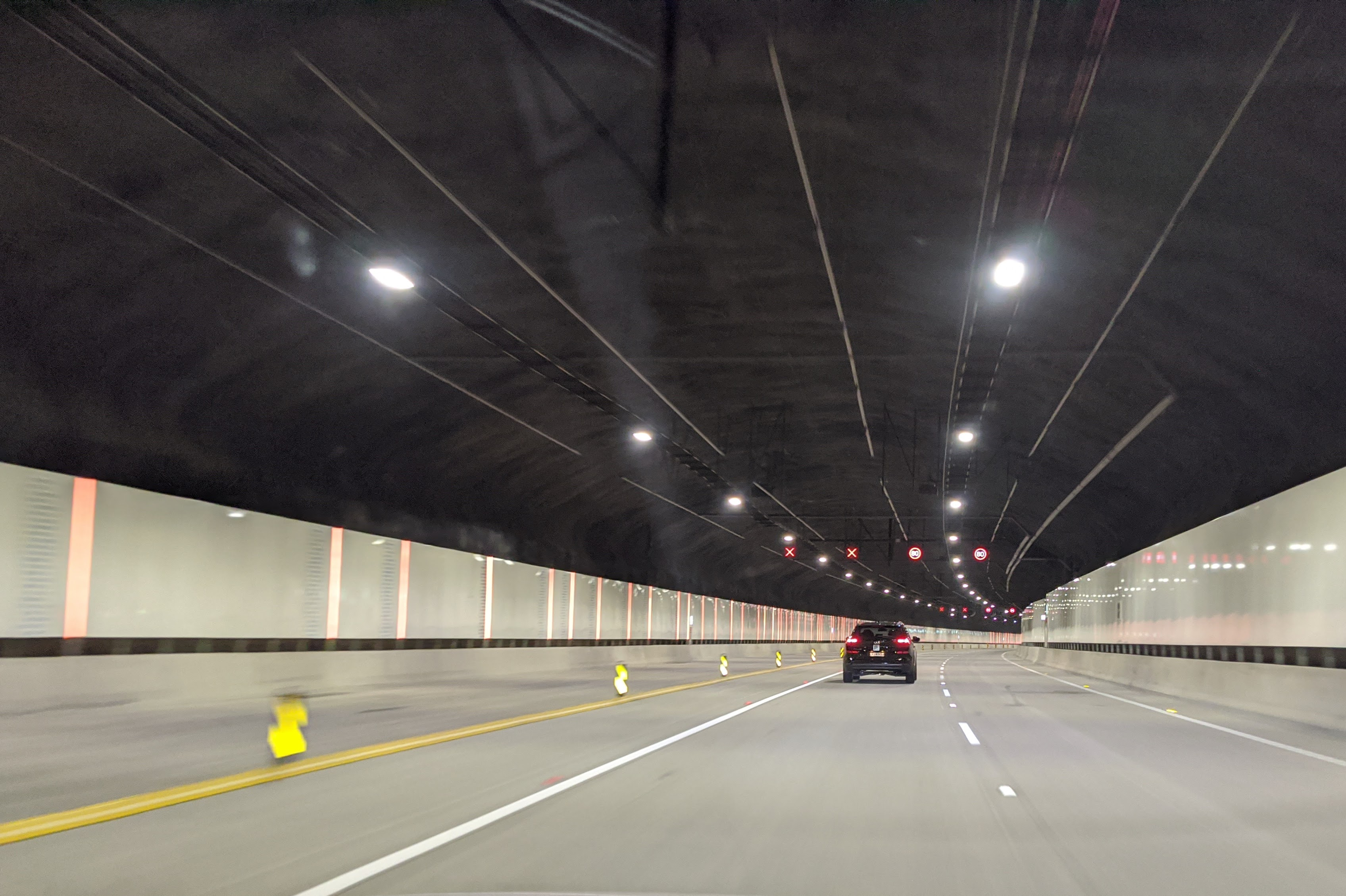
- Westbound view of the M8 tunnel
- Coordinates: 33.940156°S 151.085617°E (Southwest end); 33.866111°S 151.167864°E (Northeast end)

General information
- Type: Motorway
- Length: 15.2 km (9.4 mi)
- Opened: July 2020 (Kingsgrove–St Peters); January 2023 (St Peters–Leichhardt); November 2023 (Leichhardt–Rozelle)
- Route number(s): M8 (2020–present)

Major junctions
- Southwest end: South Western Motorway; Kingsgrove, Sydney
- East Motorway; City West Link
- Northeast end: Iron Cove Link; Rozelle, Sydney

Highway system
- Highways in Australia; National Highway • Freeways in Australia; Highways in New South Wales

The M8 Motorway is a 15.2-kilometre (9.4 mi) tolled dual carriageway motorway in Sydney that is designated the M8 route marker. It consists predominantly of tunnels and includes tunnel connections to the future Western Harbour Tunnel and the M6 Motorway.

As of November 2023, the M8 motorway comprises only the WestConnex M8 tolled motorway which opened in multiple stages:

- The first stage to open (previously known as the New M5) was a 9-kilometre (5.6 mi) section that links the M5 Motorway at Kingsgrove to the St Peters Interchange at St Peters.
- The second and third stages to open (previously known as part of the M4–M5 Link and later M4–M8 Link) were extensions of WestConnex M8 from St Peters to Leichhardt where it meets the M4 Motorway and the Rozelle Interchange to allow connections with Victoria Road and the Anzac Bridge.

These sections were constructed as part of the WestConnex project, and WestConnex tolls are applied.

Future sections of the M8 are being constructed as the Western Harbour Tunnel, which will connect the M8 at Rozelle Interchange to the A8 at Neutral Bay. Separate to WestConnex, it is expected to open in 2028.

== Route ==
From its western end at Kingsgrove the route branches out of the M5 corridor and travels parallel to the M5 East. The route then curves to the north and runs parallel to Princes Highway. Tunnel connections to the future M6 Motorway towards Southern Sydney and Wollongong have already been built at where the route curves north. Just north of the curve, there are exits to St Peters Interchange in St Peters, with further connections towards the Eastern Suburbs via Euston Road and Gardeners Road, and towards Sydney Airport via the Sydney Gateway. The section of the M8 between Kingsgrove and St Peter is marked at two lanes in each direction, with capacity for a third lane to be added if required.

The route continues running parallel to Princes Highway past St Peters along the M4-M8 Link. crosses underneath the suburbs of Newtown and Leichhardt. At Leichhardt, the route branches from the tunnels that would continue towards the M4, and heads north towards Rozelle Interchange before terminating at exits to City West Link and Iron Cove Link at Rozelle. This is the northern terminus of the route until the Western Harbour Tunnel is completed in 2028.

=== St Peters Interchange ===
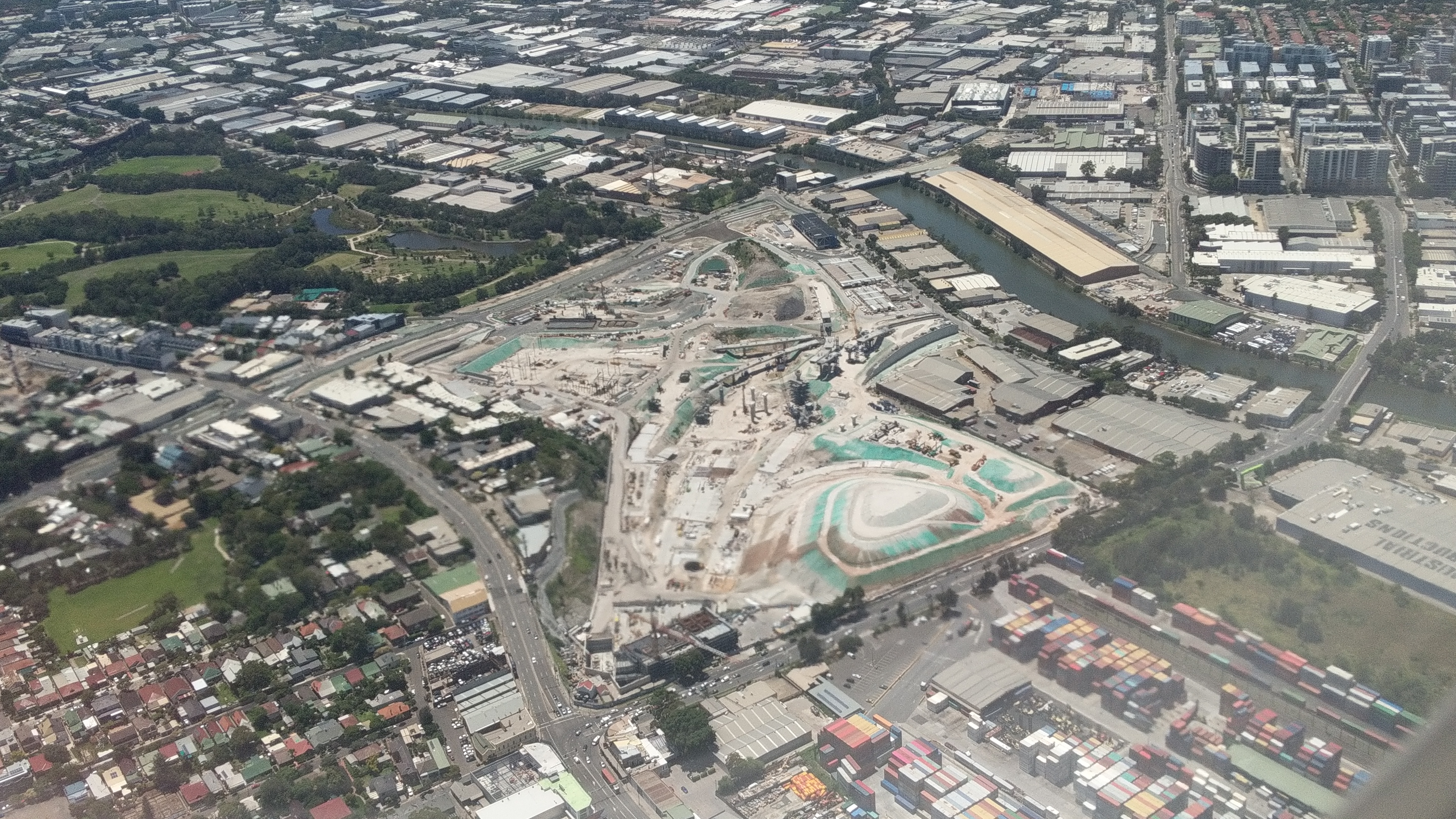
St Peters Interchange under construction

St Peters Interchange is a road interchange of five roadways, namely:

- M8 towards the M5 at Kingsgrove
- M8 towards Rozelle Interchange at Rozelle
- Euston Road – towards Randwick
- Gardeners Road – towards Kingsford
- Sydney Gateway – towards Sydney Airport

The interchange was built on the site of the former Alexandria Landfill waste facility, and opened to traffic with the first section of the M8 Motorway in July 2020. At the time of opening, bridges and tunnel entrances/exits to the future sections of M8 and the Sydney Gateway had already been completed. The final bridge of the St Peters Interchange was put in place in October 2019.

Until 2023, the interchange was the northern terminus of the M8 Motorway. When new sections of the motorway opened in January 2023, the alignment of the new tunnels bypassed the St Peters Interchange, and its approaches became entry and exit ramps of the motorway.

== History ==
=== New M5 (first stage) ===
In 2009 the government released the M5 Transport Corridor Feasibility Study, which investigated strategic options for improving the M5 motorway corridor. The study identified a preliminary preferred option, being the M5 East Duplication, consisted of duplicating the M5 East and construction of a new connection from the M5 East at Arncliffe to Euston Road, Qantas Drive and Gardeners Road. The strategic concept for the M5 East Duplication was placed on public exhibition between November 2009 and March 2010 for community and stakeholder feedback. Feedback received was used to further develop and refine the scheme. In 2012, the scheme become the King Georges Road Interchange Upgrade and New M5 projects, the second stage of WestConnex. The New M5 would consist of separate tunnels parallel to the M5 East tunnels.

The New M5 had the potential to impact the critically endangered Cooks River/Castlereagh Ironbark ecological community and the green and golden bell frog, which are listed under the Commonwealth Environmental Protection and Biodiversity Act 1999. Environmental approval from the federal Minister for the Environment was granted on 11 July 2016 and construction commenced later that month. The New M5 was estimated to have a project cost of A$4.335 billion in 2015. On 3 June 2020, M8 was revealed as the new name and route designation for the New M5, and it opened on 5 July 2020.

=== M4–M5 Link (second and third stages) ===
The section of WestConnex between St Peters and Haberfield was constructed as the third stage of WestConnex and was known as M4–M5 Link. In September 2022, the New South Wales Government announced that the M4-M5 Link will be referred to as extensions of the M4 and M8 when the link opened in 2023.

The main tunnels between the M4 and M8 opened on 20 January 2023, with the M4 and M8 route markers extended to meet at Leichhardt until the Rozelle Interchange opened, which it did on 26 November 2023, and the M8 route marker was further extended to Rozelle.

=== Route numbering ===
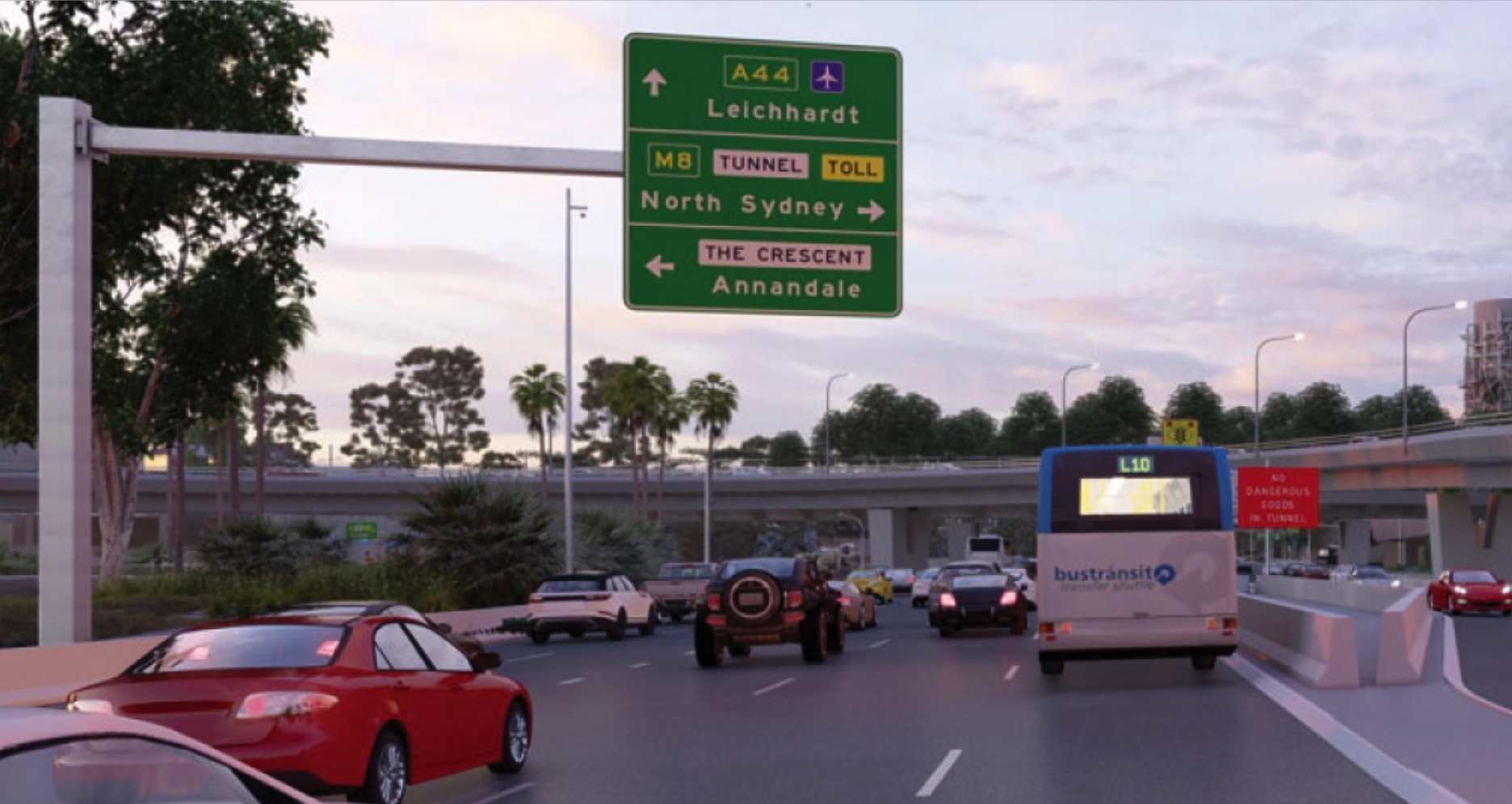
M8 Motorway signage concept at Rozelle Interchange

The M8 Motorway was first named in Section 300-2 of the Road Rules 2014, as amended in 2019, to be the tunnels between Beverly Hills and St Peters, and St Peters and Rozelle Interchange. The modification report for The Crescent overpass released in April 2020 showed an image of the proposed signage "M8 North Sydney", indicating that M8 is to continue from Rozelle Interchange towards North Sydney via the Western Harbour Tunnel. The official announcement of the M8 route designation in June 2020 confirmed that M8 would further continue along the proposed Beaches Link and connect with the A8 in the Northern Beaches, though the project was put on hold indefinitely.

The next section of the M8 that opened, the M4-M8 Link, is the third stage of the Westconnex project and has a long history in similar forms. It was previously known as the "M4 South" and follows much of the alignment of the Inner West Motorway which originally formed the northern end of the F6 Freeway in the 1948 Cumberland County Plan to build an inner-city bypass and link the airport and shipping terminals.

=== Speed limit change ===
The speed limit on the WestConnex M8, along with the WestConnex M4 and M4-M8 Link, was increased from 80 km/h to 90 km/h in April 2024. The change was claimed by the government to be underpinned by thorough safety review by Transport for NSW, which investigated the safety of the increase. The NSW Minister of Roads, John Graham, claimed the speed limit change was "being implemented with safety as the sole focus".

== Toll ==
Motorists are charged WestConnex distance-based tolls to use the twin tunnels. The toll charge consists of:

- a flagfall
- a charge per kilometre

Tolls for heavy vehicles are triple of cars and motorcycles. Toll prices increase by 4% or the consumer price index (CPI) every year, whichever is greater, until 2040, after which CPI will apply.

As the M5 East and M8 are tolled under WestConnex, a vehicle travelling on the M5 East (between King Georges Road and M8) and M8 together will only incur a single toll.

Toll prices as of 1 July 2025
Toll road	Class A toll prices (Note: Class A vehicles are typically cars and motorcycles; Class B vehicles are all other vehicles including trucks and heavy vehicles)			Class B toll prices	Toll increase	Toll concessionaire	Expiry of toll concession
Toll road	Flagfall	Charge per km	Toll cap	Class B toll prices	Toll increase	Toll concessionaire	Expiry of toll concession
WestConnex (M4, M5 East, M8)	$1.73	$0.6411	$12.25	3 x of Class A prices	Annually on 1 January, by the greater of CPI or 4% until December 2040, and then by positive CPI only	Sydney Transport Partners (9% Tawreed Investments 10.5% CPPIB, 10% Caisse de dépôt et placement du Québec (CDPQ), 20.5% Australian Super, 50% Transurban)	2060

== Exits and interchanges ==
LGA	Location	km	mi	Destinations	Notes
Canterbury-Bankstown	Kingsgrove	0.0	0.0	South West Motorway (M5) – Liverpool, Campbelltown	Southern terminus of motorway and route M8
Canterbury-Bankstown	Kingsgrove	0.0	0.0	Tunnel western terminus	
Bayside	Arncliffe	6.1	3.8	M6 Motorway – Kogarah, Miranda, Sutherland	Under construction, expected completion late 2028; Northbound entrance and southbound exit only
Cooks River		6.5	4.0	Cooks River tunnel	
Inner West	St Peters	9.0	5.6	WestConnex M8 northern terminus; M4–M8 Link southern terminus	
Inner West	St Peters	9.0	5.6	Euston Road (north) – Alexandria, Waterloo, Randwick; Gardeners Road (east) – Mascot, Kingsford; Campbell Road – Enmore, Alexandria	St Peters Interchange
Inner West	Leichhardt	12.5	7.8	East Motorway (M4) – Strathfield, Parramatta, Penrith	M4–M8 link continues along M4 motorway Rozelle Interchange southern terminus
Inner West	Lilyfield	13.9	8.6	Northern end of toll road	
Inner West	Lilyfield	13.9	8.6	City West Link (A44) – Sydney, Anzac Bridge	Southbound entrance and northbound exit only
Inner West	Rozelle	14.4	8.9	Iron Cove Link, to Victoria Road (A40) – Lane Cove, Ryde	Northern terminus of motorway and route M8; Rozelle Interchange northern terminus
Inner West	Rozelle	15.2	9.4	Western Harbour Tunnel (north) – North Sydney, Cammeray	Under construction, expected completion 2028
1.000 mi = 1.609 km; 1.000 km = 0.621 mi: Incomplete access; Tolled; Route transition; Unopened

== See also ==
- List of highways in New South Wales
- List of motorways in New South Wales
