= St Peters, New South Wales =

St Peters
- Suburb
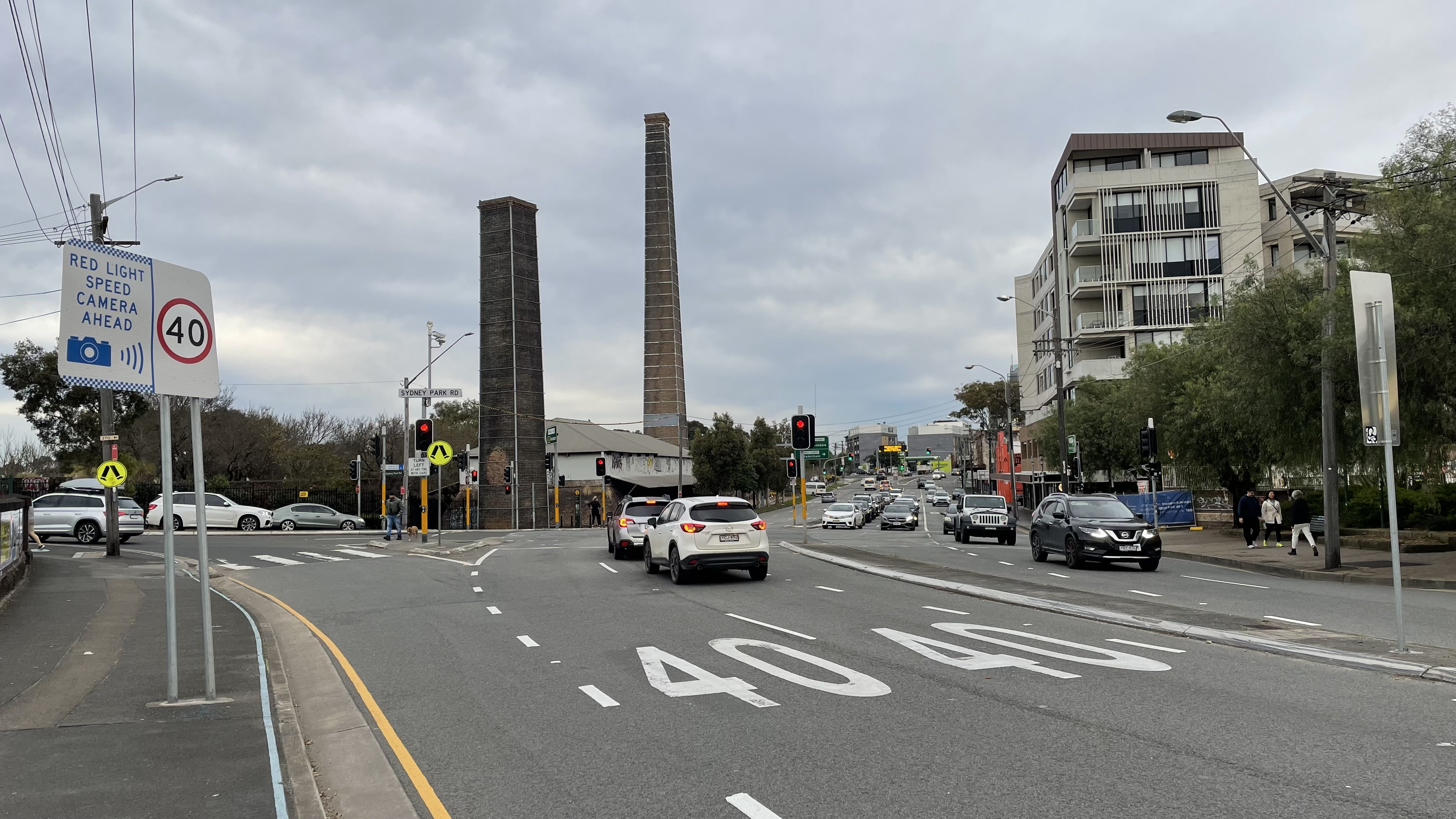
- Intersection of Princes Highway and Sydney Park Road

- Interactive map of St Peters
- Coordinates: 33.90951°S 151.17723°E
- Country: Australia
- State: New South Wales
- City: Sydney
- LGAs: Inner West Council; City of Sydney
- Location: 7 km (4.3 mi) south of Sydney CBD

Government
  - State electorate: Heffron
  - Federal divisions: Grayndler; Sydney

Area
  - Total: 1.73 km^{2} (0.67 sq mi)
- Elevation: 15 m (49 ft)

Population
  - Total: 3,629 (2021 census)
  - Density: 2,098/km^{2} (5,433/sq mi)
- Postcode: 2044
Suburbs around St Peters
Enmore	Newtown	Erskineville
Marrickville	St Peters	Alexandria
Sydenham	Tempe	Mascot

St Peters is a suburb in the Inner West of Sydney, in the state of New South Wales, Australia. It is 7 kilometres south of the Sydney central business district, in the local government area of Inner West Council, with a small section in the southeast in the City of Sydney.

== History ==
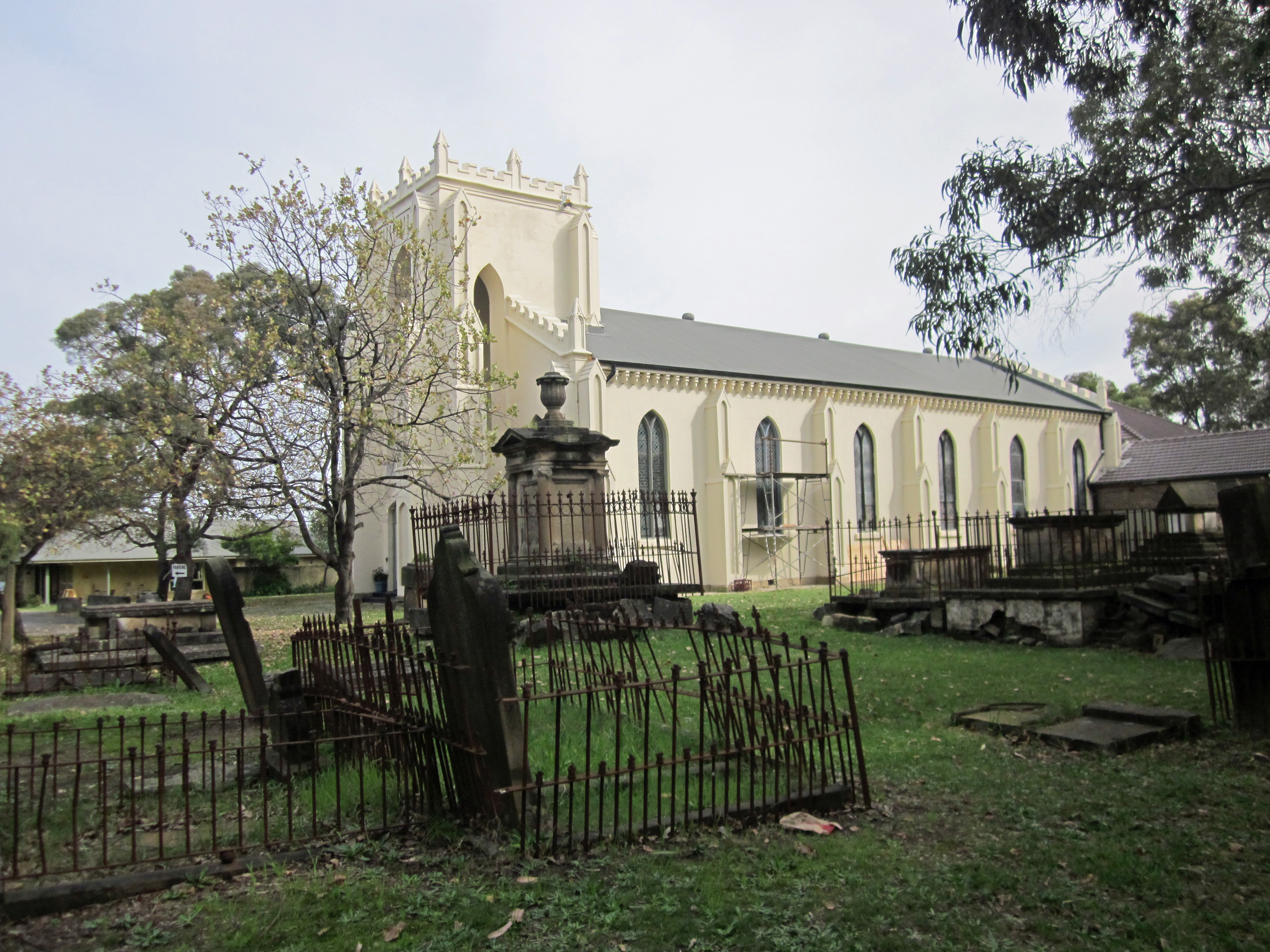
St Peters Anglican Church

St Peters was named by its association with St Peters Anglican Church, which was consecrated in 1838. St Peters is the third oldest Anglican church in Sydney and has been claimed to be the first church built in Australia using non-convict labour. The church is on the Princes Highway. It was designed by Thomas Bird and built in 1838–39. In 1875, alterations were carried out under the supervision of Edmund Blacket. The church is now listed on the Register of the National Estate. The graveyard is the burial place of a few notable people, including solicitor and merchant Frederick Wright Unwin, who had Unwin Road and Unwin's Bridge named after him. It is also the burial place of people who committed suicide, patients of the Bayview Mental Asylum at Tempe, and victims of unsolved murders. Graveyard history tours are conducted monthly.

In 2009, the church was given a grant of $30,000 from the state government for carrying out much-needed renovations. The grant was aimed at repairing cracked walls and sealing windows. Pastor Shane Rogerson said the building was "ill-fated from the beginning" because it was built on clay-based soil, which meant it will always have problems with cracking.

The first large land grant in the area was made in 1799 to Provost-Marshal Thomas Smyth. His 470 acres (1.9 km^{2}) stretched from the Cooks River to the present Campbell Street. After Smyth's death in 1804, the land was acquired by Robert Campbell (1769–1846), a wealthy merchant who built some of the early warehouses along the Sydney Cove waterfront.

Alexander Brodie Spark (1792–1856) was a wealthy merchant who named the suburbs of Tempe after his mansion Tempe House that he built at what is now Wolli Creek and the suburb of St Peters that developed around the church. Barwon Park House was a large residence erected by Spark in 1815 on land leased from Robert Campbell. It was demolished in 1953. Campbell sold his property in 1830 but reserved land for the church. St Peters was described in the 1840s as one of the most fashionable and aristocratic suburbs of Sydney.

St Peters was a separate municipality from 1871 to 1948, when it amalgamated with the Municipality of Marrickville but now falls under the governance of Inner West Council. The St Peters town hall in Unwins Bridge Road was built in 1927 just across the suburb boundary in Sydenham and now houses the St Peters branch of Inner West Library and a small community centre. The railway station opened on 15 October 1884 and the post office opened in October 1851.

=== Brickworks and tip ===
In the 1870s, St Peters was an important brickmaking centre. Eventually brickworks expanded to take up most of the present-day suburb - all of the land east of the Princes Highway.

The brickworks closed after World War II and for most of the 1960s and 1970s the site was used as a rubbish tip, with the vast clay pits eventually filled by domestic and commercial refuse. After the tip closed in the 1980s, it was used in for industrial purposes. In the early 21st century, the site was used to construct the St Peters Interchange, part of the WestConnex project. The interchange opened to traffic on the M8 Motorway in 2020. When fully completed in 2024, it will be the interchange between the M8 and a number of other motorways extending northwest, and east to the Airport.

Part of the same brickworks area, close to St Peters railway station but in the neighbouring suburb of Alexandria, New South Wales, on the corner of Mitchell Road (now Sydney Park Road) and the Princes Highway, was turned into Sydney Park in the 1980s. The area was covered, landscaped and revegetated so that several large artificial hills were created with sweeping views south to Botany Bay and north to the city. Four towering chimneys that carried exhaust from the brick kilns remain standing and have been incorporated into the Sydney Park site along with some of the kilns and various pieces of large brickworks machinery. The remains of the brickworks were heritage-listed.

The brickworks are well known in paleontology for the discovery of a full, intact skeleton of a Paracyclotosaurus davidi in 1910. The Paracyclotosaurus davidi was a prehistoric amphibian and the only known species to have lived in Australia.

== Heritage listings ==
St Peters has a number of heritage-listed sites, including:

- 187-209 Princes Highway: St Peter's Anglican Church
- Princes Highway (opposite Sydney Park Road): St Peters railway station

== Population ==
According to the 2021 census, there were 3,629 residents in St Peters. 63.0% of residents were born in Australia. The next most common country of birth was England (5.5%). The most common ancestries in St Peters were English 31.4%, Australian 25.4%, Irish 13.7%, Scottish 9.9% and Chinese 6.4%. 74.6% of people only spoke English at home. The most common responses for religious affiliation were No Religion (59.3%), Catholic (15.6%), Not stated 5.0%, Anglican 3.8% and Eastern Orthodox 3.6%. St Peters has the highest proportion of female same-sex couples out of any suburb in Australia.

== Transport ==
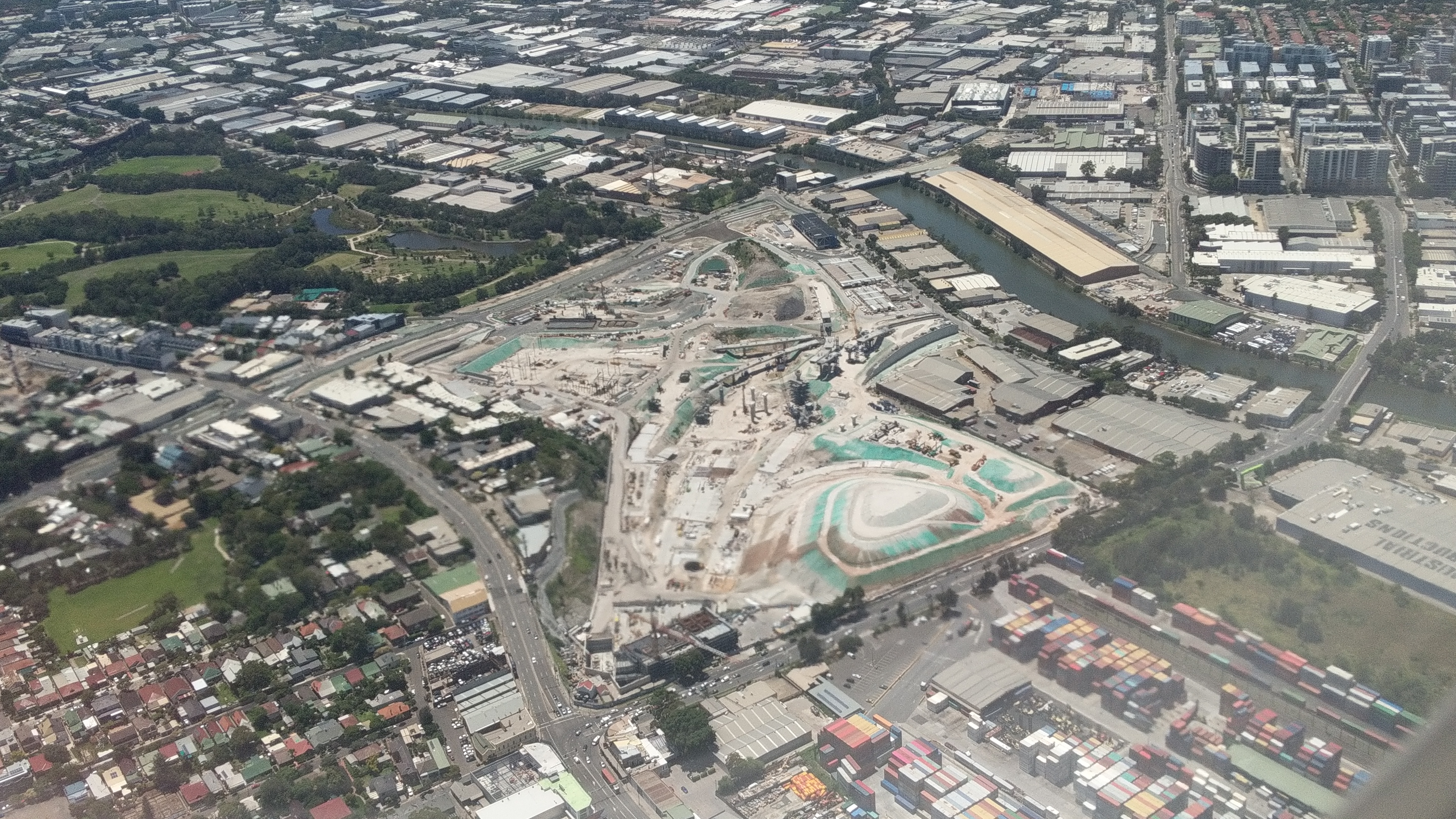
St Peters Interchange under construction, viewed from the southwest. The residential part of the suburb is on the left of this image.

The Princes Highway is a major arterial road in southern Sydney. It has its origins in St Peters at the intersection with King Street and Sydney Park Road. Also located at this intersection is St Peters railway station which is serviced by either the Airport & South Line or the Eastern Suburbs & Illawarra Line of the Sydney Trains network. Transit Systems and Transdev John Holland routes service St Peters including the Kogarah bound 422 from Railway Square and the Coogee bound 370 from Glebe Point.

A major road interchange, the St Peters Interchange, occupies the eastern part of the suburb, built as part of the WestConnex project. The interchange occupies a large part of the old tip site, a site larger than the entire residential part of the suburb. The eastern end of the M8 Motorway emerges at the interchange. By 2023 the interchange will also provide connections to western Sydney via the M4-M5 Link tunnel and to Sydney Airport via the Sydney Gateway.

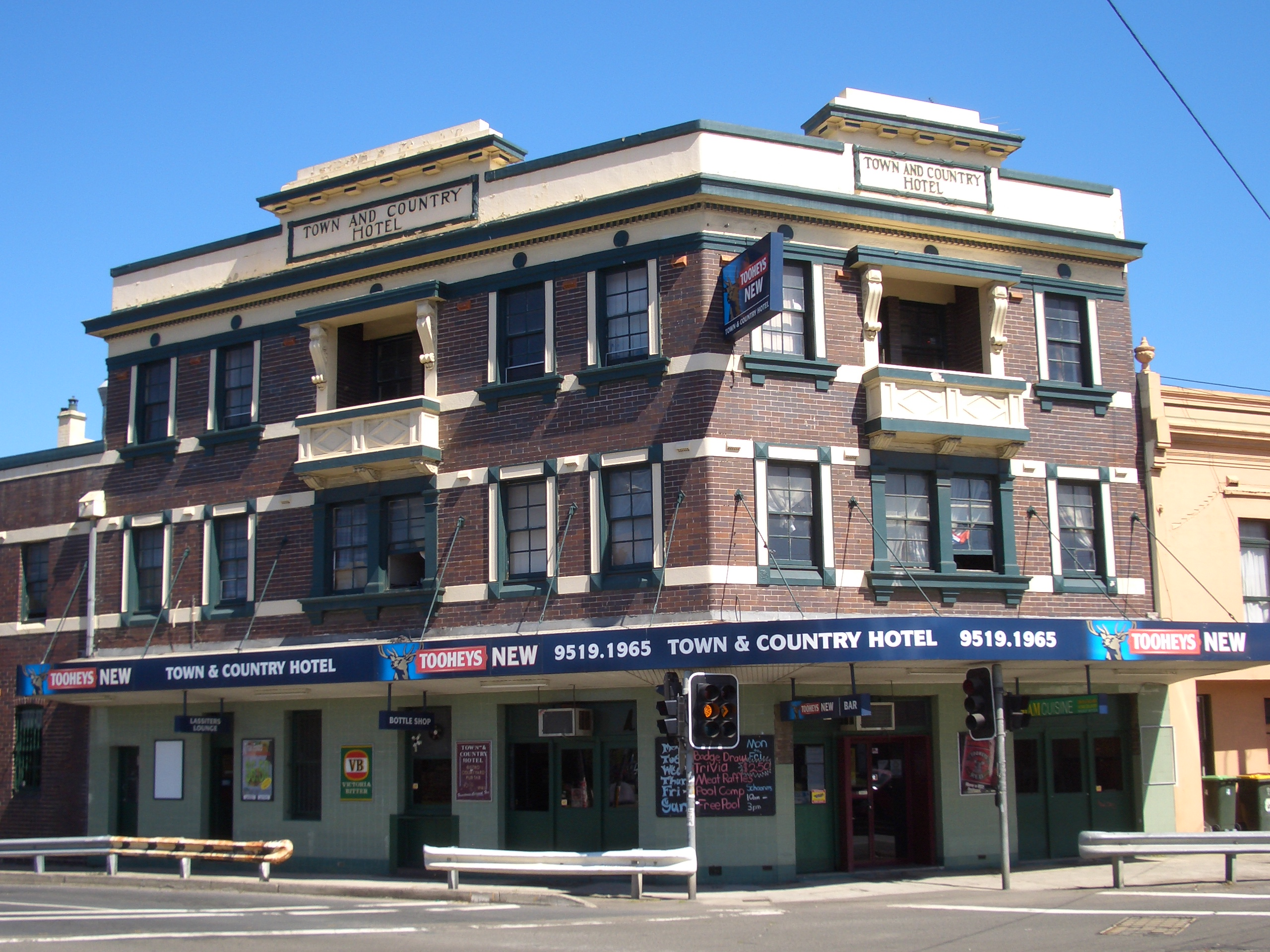
Town and Country Hotel, Unwins Bridge Road

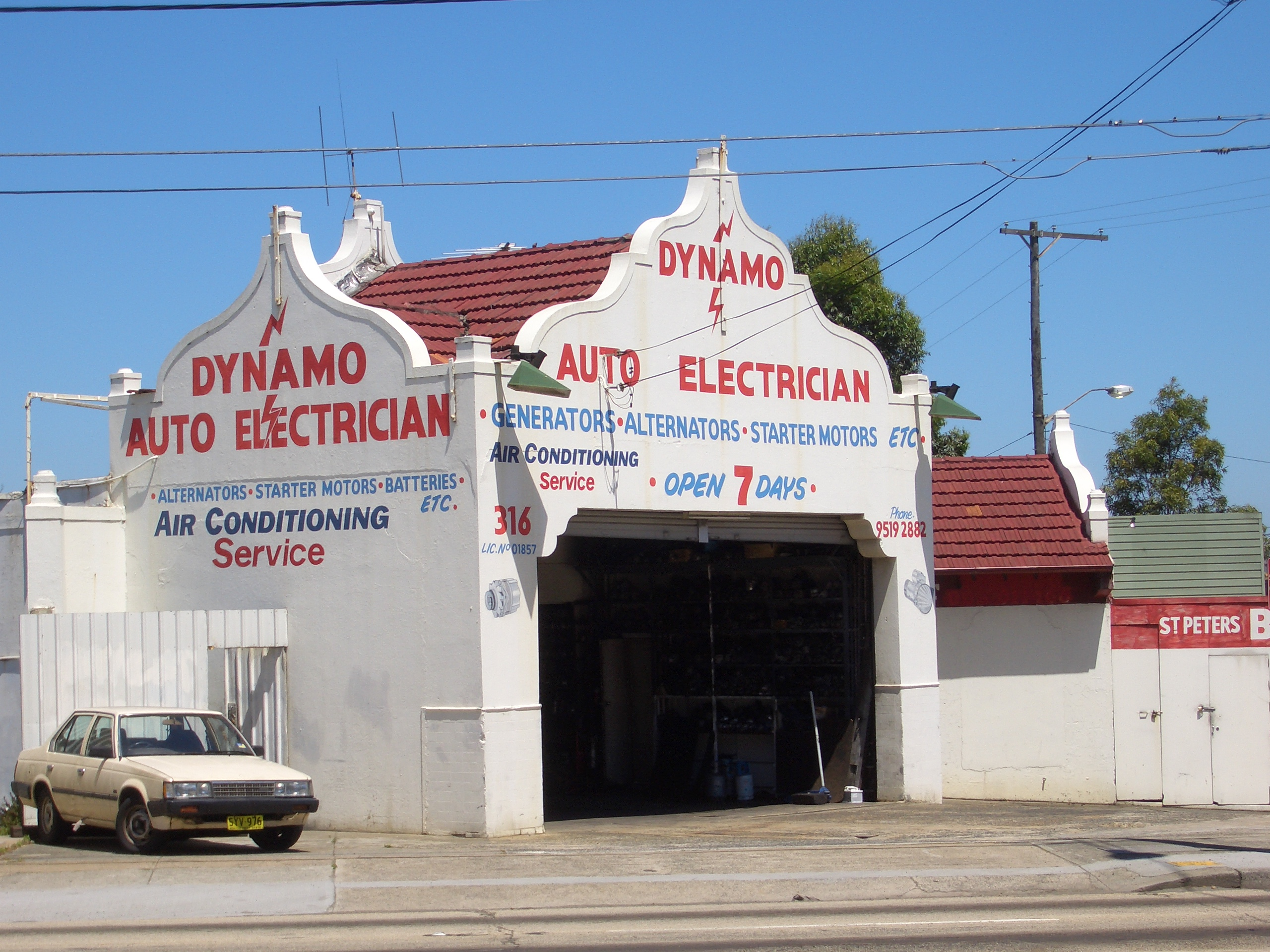
Garage on Princes Highway

== Features ==
St Peters has a mixture of residential, commercial and industrial areas. The larger portion of the suburb, east of the Princes Highway, on the site of the former tip and historical brickworks, was industrial land until recently, but will be turned into a major road junction called the St Peters Interchange as part of the WestConnex project. A portion of the suburb in the north and west, adjacent to the railway line and Unwins Bridge Road, is also largely industrial.

The small, remaining part of the suburb west of the Princes Highway but east of the railway is largely residential. The main shopping strip is located along the Princes Highway, leading into King Street, Newtown.

== Landmarks ==
- Camdenville Oval sits between May Street and the railway line.
- St Peters is the home of the Town and Country Hotel, immortalised in the song "Duncan" recorded by Slim Dusty. The Southern Cross Hotel is located on the corner of Princes Highway and Canal Road.
- Olympic rings, used to decorate Sydney during the 2000 Olympics, now adorn the entrance to a recycling centre at St Peters.

== Schools ==
St Peters Church of England School began in 1849. A permanent building was opened on Cooks River Road in 1855. The school was taken over by the Department of Education in 1881 and became St Peters Public School. The church school building was used until the present day school was erected.
