= Sydney Gateway =

Major road interchange in Sydney, Australia

Sydney Gateway New South Wales
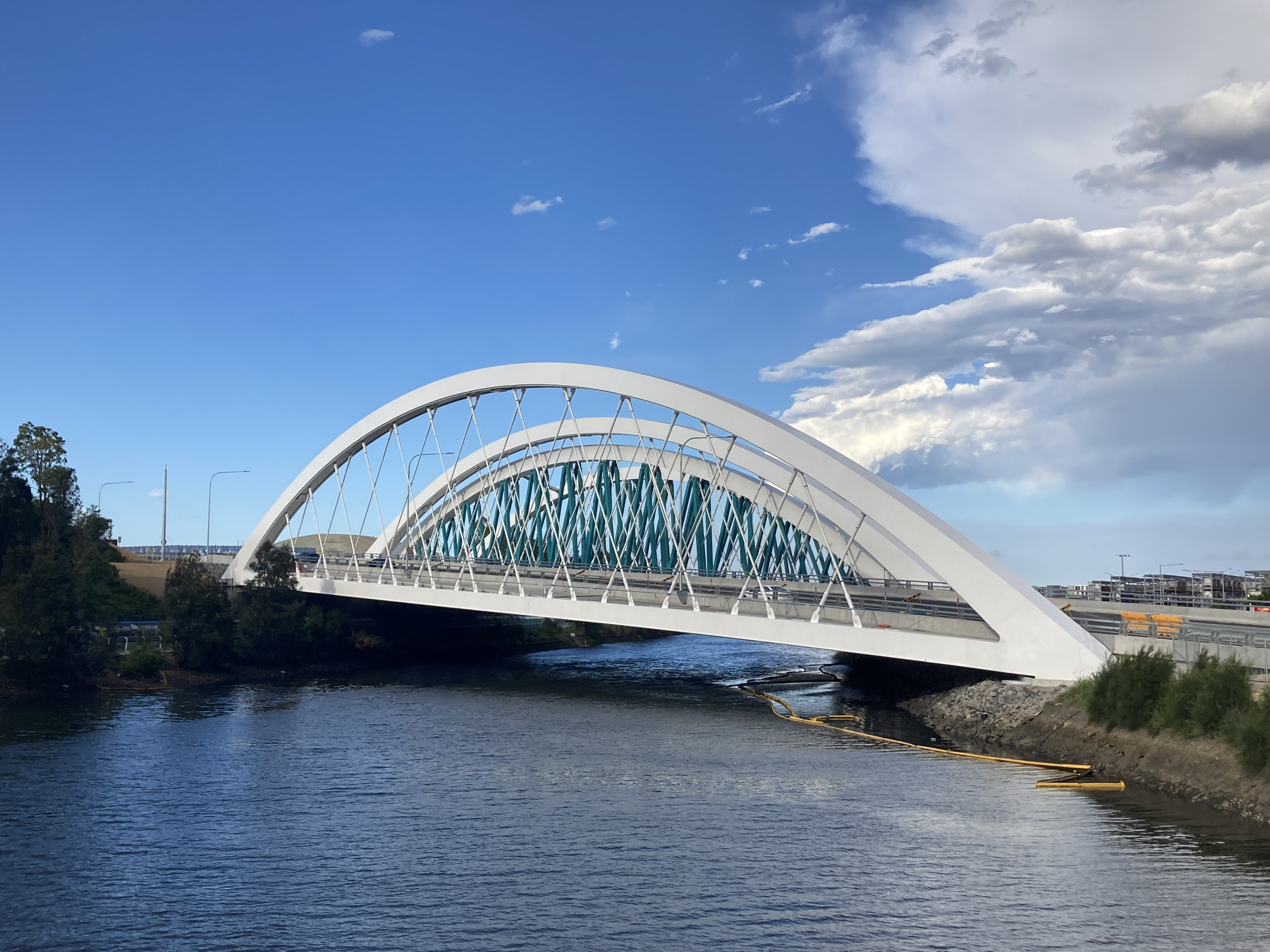
- Twin Arch Bridge over the Alexandra Canal in December 2023
- Coordinates: 33°55′23″S 151°10′12″E

General information
- Type: Road junction
- Location: St George District
- Built by: John Holland; Seymour Whyte
- Maintained by: Transport for NSW
- History: 12 November 2023: Stage 2 opened 19 November 2023: Stage 1 opened 21 April 2024: Stage 3 opened 1 September 2024: Final stage opened

Major junctions
- North end: St Peters Interchange; M4–M8 Link; M8 Motorway; St Peters, Sydney
- South end: Airport Drive; Qantas Drive; Sydney Airport; Mascot, Sydney

The Sydney Gateway is a major road interchange between the WestConnex and the airport terminals of Sydney Airport, and includes a pair of arch bridges over the Alexandra Canal and an eastbound flyover connecting Qantas Drive to the domestic terminal. It connects the Sydney Motorway network with the Sydney Airport and Port Botany precincts via the St Peters Interchange. The project provides significantly improved road links between the Airport, CBD and Port Botany, whilst reducing congestion.

Construction began in early 2021 and sections of the interchange were progressively opened from November 2023. The interchange opened on 1 September 2024. It was originally planned to fully open in late 2023 in conjunction with the connecting M4–M8 Link, the latter of which opened earlier in January 2023.

The Sydney Gateway was constructed in conjunction with the duplication of the nearby Port Botany railway line by the Australian Rail Track Corporation.

== Design ==
The Sydney Gateway starts at the St Peters Interchange, the junction of the M8 Motorway and M4–M8 Link, all of which were built as part of WestConnex. Viaducts have been constructed over Canal Road, the Port Botany railway line and Tempe Lands. Further southwest, the Sydney Gateway splits into two, leading to Airport Drive and Qantas Drive towards the west and east respectively.

A section of Airport Drive had been closed permanently and traffic between the international and domestic terminals is accessed via Sydney Gateway. A pair of arch bridges has been constructed over the Alexandra Canal for the realigned traffic, and has been referred to as Twin Arch Bridge by the state government.

A single traffic light is also located along the Sydney Gateway for access to and from Link Road, just east of the Twin Arch Bridge. This is the only controlled intersection along the Sydney Gateway, with the rest of the Sydney Gateway being free-flowing traffic.

A 800-metre (2,600 ft) long one-way elevated flyover in the eastbound/southbound direction has also been built linking Qantas Drive towards the Sir Reginald Ansett Drive and the domestic terminals precinct. The flyover bypasses two signalised intersections with Seventh Street and O'Riordan Street, and enables travel from Sydney's motorway network to the domestic terminals without stopping at a single traffic light. The flyover has been named Deborah Lawrie Flyover after Australia's first female commercial pilot Deborah Lawrie.

== Tolls ==
Sydney Gateway is toll-free. However, WestConnex tolls still apply to traffic coming or going via St Peters Interchange, as traffic must use the WestConnex tunnels and cannot exit the St Peters Interchange onto Euston Road or Gardeners Road.

== History ==
=== Planning ===
In November 2017, the project was in the design and planning phase that includes developing connections to the St Peters interchange, to Sydney Airport Terminals 1, 2 and 3, grade separation of Robey Street and O’Riordan Street in Mascot, the duplication of a 3-kilometre (1.9 mi) section of the Port Botany railway line, within a complex stakeholder environment, with significant utility assets impacted and a heavily congested area. A 2017 proposal by Lendlease was not accepted. The railway line duplication was separately managed by the Australian Rail Track Corporation. Stages 1 and 3 then formed the remainder of the project managed by the state government.

The proposed alignment passes over Sydney Airport land, which is leased from the federal government. As such, the project required both state and federal planning processes. In addition to an Environmental Impact Statement (EIS) as required by state planning process, a Major Development Plan (MDP) was also required before major development at a leased airport could occur. Planning approvals from both the federal and state planning ministers were also required. A combined EIS and MDP was released for exhibition on 20 November 2019. The project was approved by the state planning minister on 27 August 2020. The project was approved by the federal planning minister on 23 September 2020.

=== Construction ===
Expressions of interest to construct the Sydney Gateway commenced in July 2019. In October 2019, three bidders were shortlisted:

- AirPortConnex led by Salini Impregilo
- John Holland and Seymour Whyte joint venture
- CPB Contractors

In November 2020, the John Holland Seymour Whyte joint venture was awarded the design and construction contract. Construction began in early 2021.

In August 2021, the project's Construction Environment Management Plan was approved by the state Department of Planning, Industry & Environment, allowing construction work to be started on state land.

=== Opening ===
The Sydney Gateway was originally planned to open in late 2023, together with the M4–M8 Link. However, it was announced in November 2020 that the project was behind schedule and completion of the project would be delayed until 2024.

In mid-2023, it was announced that the Sydney Gateway would be open in stages. The first stage would be the eastbound direction including the eastbound arch bridge and the traffic light connection to Link Road. The second stage would be the flyover from Qantas Drive to the domestic terminal buildings (later named Deborah Lawrie Flyover). The third stage would be the westbound direction including a widened Qantas Drive and the westbound arch bridge. The last and fourth stage would be the connection to WestConnex and St Peters Interchange, and new pedestrian and cycling paths.

The second stage opened first on 12 November 2023, while the first stage opened a week later on 19 November. On 11 February 2024, the westbound traffic was diverted via Sydney Gateway and temporarily via the eastbound arch bridge. On 21 April 2024, the westbound arch bridge opened and westbound traffic was moved onto the new bridge. The final stage opened on 1 September 2024.

== Future ==
The South East Sydney Transport Strategy, released by Transport for NSW in August 2020, proposed a potential extension of Sydney Gateway to Port Botany by 2056, with grade separation at General Holmes Drive, as well as ramps connecting to Canal Road.
