= Paul Schroder =

Australian trade union official (born 1966 or 1967)

Chief Executive of AustralianSuper
- Incumbent
- Assumed office 2021

Chief Risk Officer at AustralianSuper

Personal details
- Born: 1966 or 1967 (age 59–60) Melbourne, Australia
- Salary: $1.14 million

Paul Schroder (born 1966 or 1967) is a former trade union official, and current chief executive of AustralianSuper, Australia's largest superfund by assets under management.

Schroder spent 20 years working in the Australian union movement before joining AustralianSuper. During this time he worked for the Finance Sector Union.

In 2007 he joined AustralianSuper as the fund's general manager of business development. He later was promoted to the role of chief risk officer, prior to his appointment as chief executive of the fund in 2021 as the replacement for Ian Silk.

Journalists in The Age criticised the fund's decision to appoint him chief executive to replace Silk instead of pursuing an international search process. Of the appointment, they said it 'did little to rescue the super sector's reputation as a storehouse for former Labor/union types'.

As of 2023 his annual salary remuneration as the fund's chief executive amounted to $1.14 million.

He has publicly advocated for social reforms of the superannuation system to reduce gender inequality, including reforms to reduce the gender gap in super balances, such as assistance for unpaid caregiving work.

The Australian Financial Review named him one of Australia’s 10 most covertly powerful people in 2026 at 9 on its list.

== See also ==
- Industry Superannuation
- Australian Labor Party
