= M6 Motorway (Sydney) =

Under-construction motorway in Sydney, Australia

M6 Motorway New South Wales

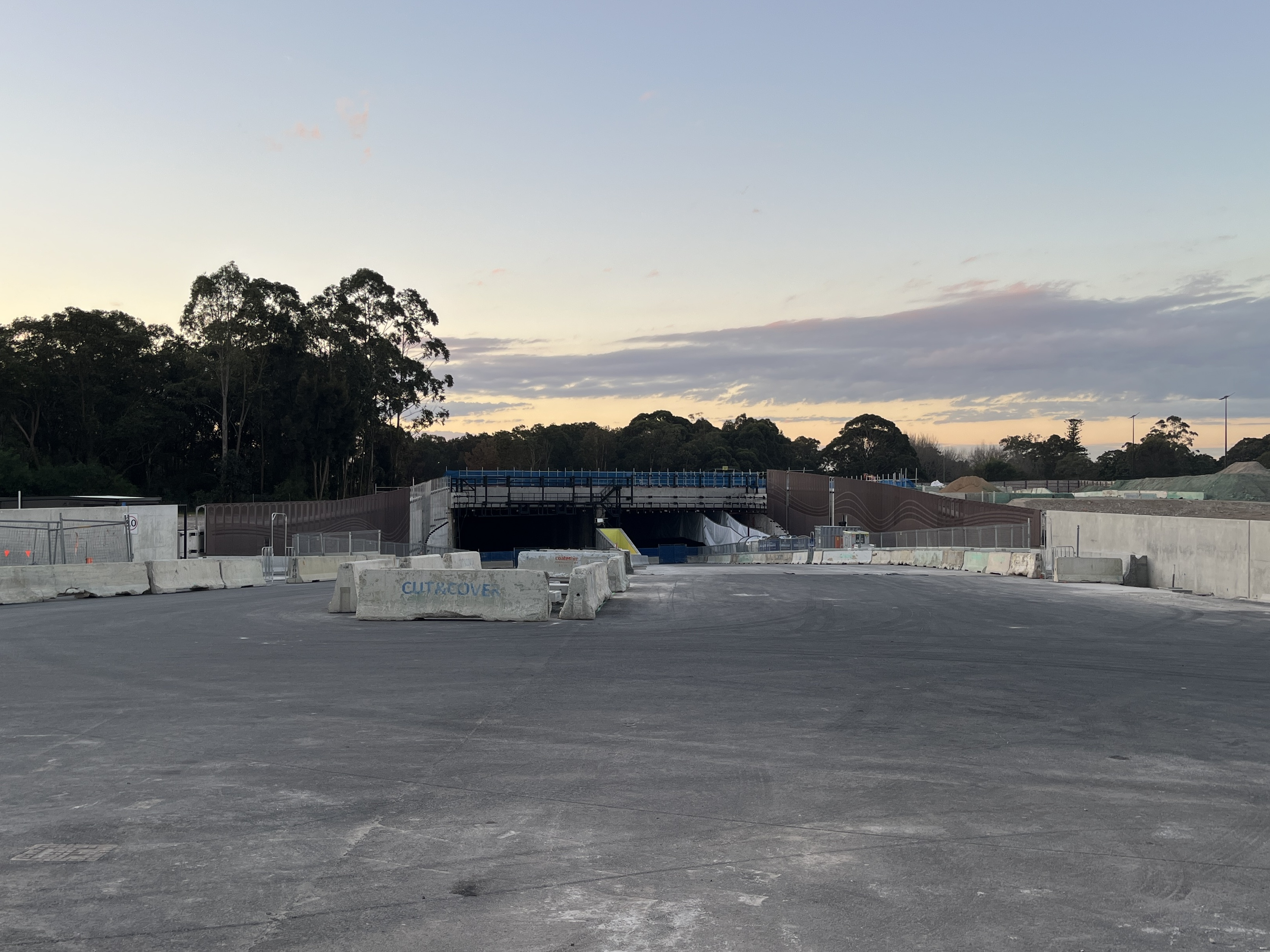
- The tunnel portal at President Avenue under construction in June 2025

General information
- Type: Motorway (Under construction)
- Length: 4 km (2.5 mi)

Major junctions
- North end: WestConnex; Arncliffe
- South end: President Avenue; Kogarah

Highway system
- Highways in Australia; National Highway • Freeways in Australia; Highways in New South Wales

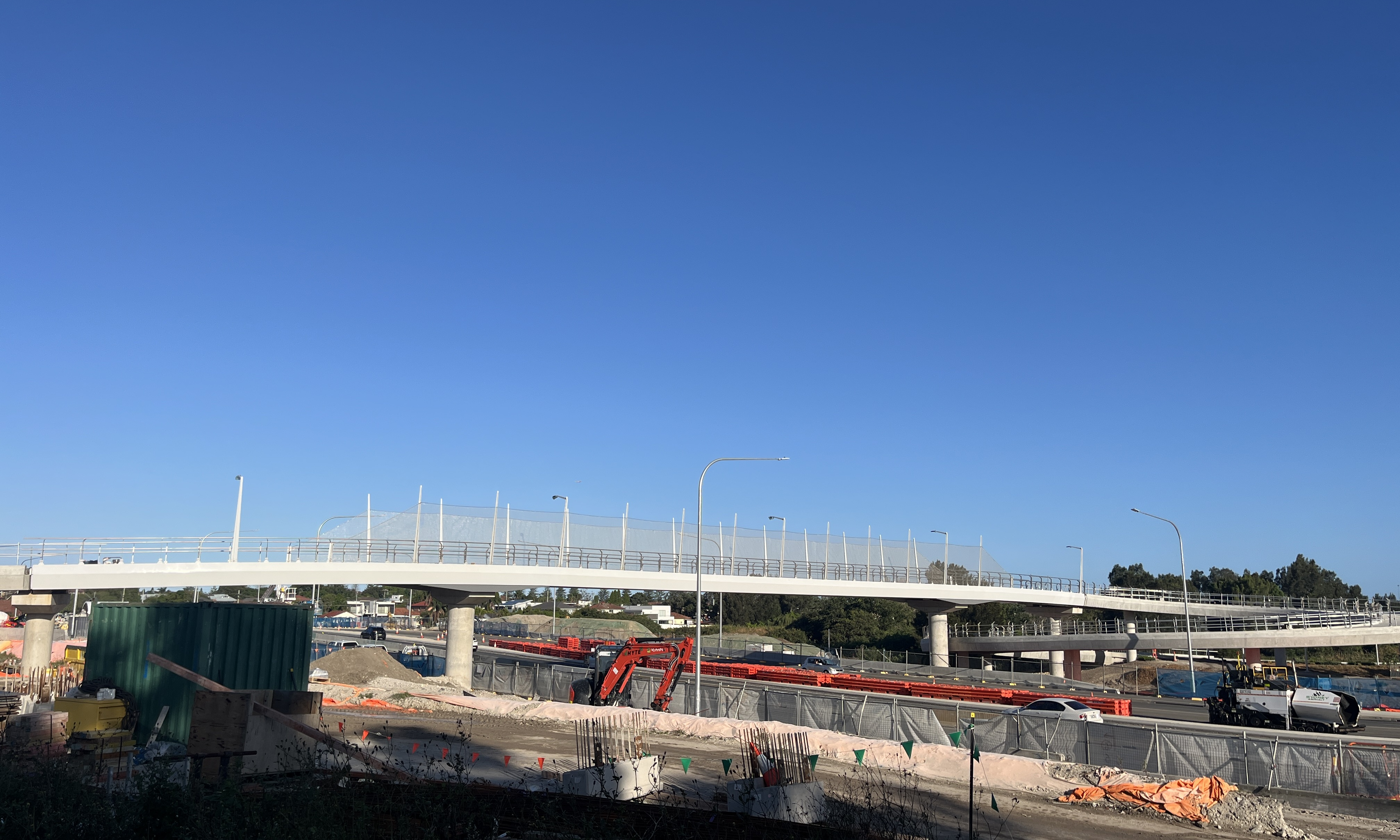
Major construction works at President Avenue in April 2025, including a new pedestrian bridge, cycleway and additional traffic lanes

The M6 Motorway is an under-construction motorway in Sydney, New South Wales consisting of twin, 4 kilometres (2.5 mi) long tunnels linking the M8 Motorway at Arncliffe to President Avenue at Kogarah. This section (referred to as "stage 1") started major construction in November 2021, expected to open in 2024, delayed to late 2028 and as of August 2026 has no projected opening date. The possibility of future extensions south to Loftus will be accommodated by providing stub tunnels in the project.

The project will include new shared cycle and pedestrian pathways, as well as a new pedestrian bridge across President Avenue. There will also be an upgrade of the Princes Highway and President Avenue intersection. As part of the motorway, a motorway control centre and tunnel ventilation facilities will be built.

The government's long term plan for the motorway includes two further sections: "Section B" would run from the southern end of Stage 1 to the existing freeway-grade section of Taren Point Road in Taren Point, and "Section C" would connect Taren Point Road with the A1 road (Princes Highway) in Loftus. In June 2022, the NSW Government announced that some proposed major infrastructure projects including stage 2 of the M6 Motorway, the Beaches Link and the Great Western Highway Blackheath to Little Hartley Tunnel would be shelved indefinitely, due to market constraints and labour shortages.

== History ==
=== Early proposals ===
The Princes Motorway, formerly the F6 Southern Freeway, is an existing motorway linking Sydney and Wollongong, with its northern terminus currently at Waterfall. There had been previous proposals to extend the F6 northwards into inner Sydney since the 1950s, but no proposal has come into fruition. Only the six-lane Captain Cook Bridge and a short connecting section of Taren Point Road to the south were built and opened in May 1965 as part of the F6 extension proposal.

In the mid-2010s, the F6 extension project was revived under the Liberal–National Coalition state government. As part of modifications made during the planning stage of the WestConnex project, stub tunnels was added to the New M5 (now M8) tunnel to allow for an extension connection to it by the F6 extension. In June 2016 the Roads & Maritime Services commenced geotechnical analysis to determine underground rock and soil conditions on the former F6 corridor from Waterfall to the Sydney Orbital Network at Rockdale with a view into developing a possible link between the Princes Motorway and the Orbital Network. It was further reported in October 2016 that any extension would be known as SouthConnex. Report in June 2018, calls it the "F6 Extension Stage 1".

== Modern-day construction ==
=== Current proposal ===
In June 2017, it was revealed that the state government had reviewed a 3.6 billion dollar railway tunnel between Thirroul and Waterfall on the Illawarra railway line that could reduce travel time between Sydney and Wollongong by 22 minutes, but that railway improvements were being sidetracked in favour of improving and extending the motorway. Later in September 2017, a state government leak showed the extent of the route, to be carried out in multiple sections which would largely follow the original planned route. The leaked document referred to the road as South Link. Sections included tunnels to the northern side of the Captain Cook Bridge, a bridge duplication allowing for motorway traffic to use the existing bridge and local traffic to keep access. To the south of the bridge, a surface motorway would run through current parks and reserves which had been left for the original route, then run along the route of the current Princes Highway with tunnels bypassing the towns of Heathcote and Waterfall before joining the existing freeway.

In October 2017, the government announced it would proceed with Stage 1 of the F6 extension, which will run via two 4 kilometres (2.5 mi) tunnels linking the New M5 (now M8) tunnels at Arncliffe to President Avenue at Kogarah. Stage 1 was originally planned to start construction in 2020 and open to traffic in late 2024.

In October 2019, the government announced a name change of the extension to M6 motorway, removing its reference to the defunct F6 name. The renaming to a different route number was due to general renaming of roads in NSW to reflect newer alphanumeric route numbers. Additionally the decision was made not to connect the future southern end of M6 at Loftus to the northern end of the M1 Princes Motorway at Waterfall, resulting in the two motorways to remain separated in the short-term. The completion date of Stage 1 was also pushed back to late 2025, with major construction planned to begin by early 2022. In December 2019, planning approval for M6 Stage 1 was granted.

In June 2022, the NSW Government announced that some proposed major infrastructure projects including stage 2 of the M6 Motorway would be shelved indefinitely, due to market constraints and labour shortages. The government states that there is no timeline, funding commitment or planning approval for the planned further sections, but the road corridor reserved since 1951 for future sections of the M6 will remain in place. Further sections of the M6 motorway are:

- Section B - Kogarah to Taren Point via Carlton and Sans Souci
- Section C - Taren Point to the A1 Princes Highway in Loftus
- Section D - Loftus to Waterfall

Prior to the start of major construction, associated construction works began on open spaces near the M6 corridor in August 2020. These include upgrades to Ador Park and McCarthy Reserve at Rockdale, and Brighton Memorial Playing Fields at Brighton-Le-Sands. The upgrades are due to the upcoming construction impacts on the open space and recreational facilities at Rockdale Bicentennial Park.

In May 2021, the $2.52 billion design and construction contract for Stage 1 was awarded to CIMIC Group's subsidiaries CPB Contractors and UGL, in a joint venture with Ghella. The combined venture is known as CGU. Major construction of Stage 1 began on 29 November 2021.

=== Community and environmental impact ===
When the proposal was announced in October 2017, community feedback was sought about the project's impact on local residents. In December 2017, members of community groups including residents of Moorefield Estate F6 Committee, led by resident Anne Field, met with the then Roads and Maritime Services (RMS), expressing concern about the lack of information available to residents about the proposals, including its final design, traffic impact, loss of parkland at the Bicentennial Wetlands, and the location of unfiltered ventilation stacks. A report into the findings, released in mid-2018, summarised the main concerns as being community amenity, air quality, environmental and construction impacts, and public and active transport infastructure.

Later that year, the Environmental Impact Statement was released. Construction impacts included the removal of 1.24 hectares of native vegetation including two threatened ecological communities listed under the Biodiversity Conservation Act 2016 and loss of around 4.45 hectares (11.0 acres) of potential foraging habitat for the grey-headed flying fox. Traffic impacts included increased traffic on President Avenue, Kogarah, O'Connell Street, Monterey and the entry ramps to the new M5 motorway entry and the exit ramps to the St Peters interchange. Health impacts included sleep disturbances due to construction noise and increase in air pollutant concentrations.

The impact of the ongoing roadworks on President Avenue, Kogarah affected business including longstanding butcher Pino's, which chose to shut down in December 2024.

=== Sinkhole incident ===
Construction on the tunnel was halted in March 2024 due to two sinkholes that opened above the tunnel: one under an industrial building on West Botany Street, Rockdale which suffered a partial structural collapse, and another 150 metres (490 ft) away. The government projected In December that the motorway would be open by late 2028.

Due to ongoing investigations on how to deal with the subsidence incidents, completion of the motorway, the motorway does not currently have a projected opening date., a delay of more than three years. In addition to the sinkholes, the 245 metres (804 ft) section of the tunnel contains a geological feature called a "high angle reverse thrust" which, due to the adverse ground conditions, caused CGU to stop tunnelling work in June 2025. An email to workers sent by the consortium's director, seen by The Sydney Morning Herald, said the feature had never been seen before in the Sydney Basin. In July, the contractor agreed to resume the above-ground surface works, including a 5km shared pedestrian and cyclist pathway from starting at Muddy Creek, Brighton-Le-Sands, through to Scarborough Park, Monterey. It also agreed to resume road works on Princes Highway, President Avenue and surrounding streets. Work was completed in December 2025.

In March 2026, two years after the sinkholes appeared, the NSW Government issued a notice of default to M6 contractors CGU after the parties failed to reach agreement on how to resume safe tunnelling. The notice requires the contractor to resume "substantive work, including tunnelling" by 1 May 2026 or risk further legal action.

On 20 August 2026, a third sinkhole opened up on the surface area above the construction of the M6 motorway project at Kogarah. On 22 August, the government announced that there is no projected opening date and that the cost of the project was projected to be $3 billion.

== Ownership ==
The first stage of the M6 will be among the first motorways in New South Wales to be publicly owned through NSW Motorways.

== Tolls ==
Toll prices are proposed to be $2.44 each way when the first stage of M6 opens. However, as all traffic will have to utilise the M8, motorists will also have to pay WestConnex tolls in addition to the M6 toll.
