= Deborah Lawrie =

Australian airline pilot (born 1953)

Deborah Jane Lawrie AM
- Born: 1953 (age 72–73); Sydney
- Education: University of Melbourne
- Occupation: Airline pilot
- Known for: First Australian woman commercial pilot

Deborah Jane Lawrie AM (born 1953), known as Deborah Wardley while married, was the first woman to become a pilot with a major Australian airline after winning a landmark sex discrimination case against Ansett Airlines.

== Early life and education ==
Deborah Lawrie was born in Sydney in 1953; her family later moved to Melbourne. Lawrie, from the age of 14, wanted to fly, and learned to fly at Moorabbin Airport when she was 16 years old. She graduated with a degree in science from the University of Melbourne in 1974 and in education from Rusden State College in 1975. She taught high school mathematics and science from 1975 to 1977.

She obtained a private pilot licence in 1971, aged 18 and a commercial pilot licence in 1973. She logged 2600 flying hours and became a general aviation flying instructor and charter pilot in 1976.

== Case against Ansett ==
Lawrie, encouraged by her husband Peter Wardley, an air traffic controller, first applied to Ansett Airlines in 1976 and kept sending applications for two years. During that time, 10 fellow male flying instructors were accepted into the Ansett pilot training program. She was finally interviewed in 1978 but was rejected. She took the case to the then new Victorian Equal Opportunity Board under the equivalent direct discrimination provisions of the Victorian Equal Opportunity Act 1977, and challenged Ansett's rejection under recently enacted equal opportunity legislation.

After marrying Peter Wardley days before the case began, she chose to use her married name in the case. The case of Wardley v Ansett Transport Industries (Operations) Pty Ltd, was the first sex discrimination in employment case contested before the Equal Opportunity Board.

Reg Ansett denied the allegation of discrimination but admitted that it was his strong personal view that women were not suited to be airline pilots. This led to public demonstration marches in August 1979, and a successful boycot (termed 'girl-cot'): businesses were encouraged by women to transfer their travel accounts from Ansett to Trans Australia Airlines and, in the first six months, Ansett lost more than 50 per cent of its business travel and a lot never returned. In a letter to the secretary of the Women's Electoral Lobby, the general manager of Ansett wrote:

Ansett has adopted a policy of only employing men as pilots. This does not mean that women cannot be good pilots, but we are concerned with the provision of the safest and most efficient air service possible. In this regard, we feel that an all-male pilot crew is safer than one in which the sexes are mixed.

Ansett raised a number of objections to the employment of women as pilots, including:

- That pilots needed strength, even though there was no strength test for pilots;
- That unions would object;
- That women's menstrual cycles made them unsuitable;
- Pregnancy and childbirth would disrupt a woman's career to the point where it would jeopardise safety and incur extra costs for the company. This was Ansett's main legal argument.

The Victorian Equal Opportunity Board ruled that Ansett's refusal to employ Lawrie was illegal. It awarded damages of $14,500 and ordered Ansett to include her in its next pilot training program. Ansett delayed its training intake and appealed to the Supreme Court of Victoria but the appeal was dismissed. Ansett appealed the Supreme Court decision to the High Court of Australia in October 1979, but employed Lawrie from 5 November pending the outcome of the case.

During classroom training, Ansett attempted to sack her by claiming she had been at fault in a near-miss incident at Moorabbin Airport despite an inquiry exonerating her and identifying the other pilot as at fault. Ansett backed down after unions stepped in.

When classroom training was completed in December 1979, she was not assigned to training aircraft despite the male trainees progressing to flight training. Ansett Airlines had been taken over by Peter Abeles and Rupert Murdoch in late 1979. Lawrie had previously trained Murdoch's brother in law, John Calvert-Jones, to fly. She telephoned Calvert-Jones in early January 1980 informing him of the situation. Two days later Rupert Murdoch issued a memo directing that she was to be treated the same as the male pilot candidates. She commenced flight training immediately and made her first commercial flight co-piloting a Fokker F27 from Alice Springs to Darwin on 22 January 1980.

The High Court dismissed Ansett's appeal in March 1980. The case is still used as a precedent. However, simply removing the most formal of exclusionary practices did not dissolve barriers, and so continuing prejudices and obstacles mean that female commercial airline pilots are still rare in Australia.

The board had ordered that Ansett pay me $40 a day until they employed me, so I was getting a pay cheque every second Wednesday, – Lawrie

Lawrie was awarded $14,500, which went toward legal fees.

== Later career ==
Lawrie progressed to jet aircraft, going on to fly the McDonnell Douglas DC-9, Boeing 727 and Boeing 737 with Ansett Airlines. She was one of 1,640 pilots who resigned en masse following the 1989 Australian pilots' dispute. She briefly returned to teaching and had her first child, Thomas, in January 1991. A biography of Lawrie was published by Allen & Unwin in 1992.

In 1993 she moved to the Netherlands and joined KLM as a Fokker 50 pilot. In 1994 she became a Fokker 50 instructor. In 1998 she became flight safety manager and chief flight safety investigator for KLM Cityhopper. Until 2007 she was also a senior Airbus A330 captain with KLM.

Following her divorce, she has resumed using the name Deborah Lawrie.

After reaching the mandatory retirement age for airline pilots in Europe, Lawrie returned to Australia in 2008. She joined Jetstar Airways as safety investigations manager and occasional pilot to maintain her type rating for Airbus A320. In July 2012 she joined Tigerair Australia and was an Airbus A320 captain and instructor, later retraining on the Boeing 737-800. When the Tigerair brand was retired by Virgin Australia Holdings in 2020 she transferred to Virgin Australia. In 2021 and 2023 Lawrie appeared on Hard Quiz as a "double dud", not winning twice on her specialist subject, Airbus A320.

As of November 2023, Lawrie is the world's oldest female commercial pilot.

She published her memoir, Touching the Sky, in 2026.

== Honours and recognition ==
Lawrie was inducted onto the Victorian Honour Roll of Women in 2001.

She was appointed a Member of the Order of Australia (AM) in the 2019 Queen's Birthday Honours in recognition of her "significant service to aviation as a commercial pilot, and to women in the profession". In June 2020 she was inducted into the Australian Aviation Hall of Fame.

== Legacy ==
In November 2023, a flyover of the Sydney Gateway leading into the Sydney Airport domestic terminal buildings was named the Deborah Lawrie Flyover. Lawrie, who was present at the flyover's name unveiling, said she was "honoured to be recognised as a trailblazer for women in aviation". The Deborah Lawrie Flyover goes right over Sir Reginald Ansett Drive.

A play based on her life, Fly Girl, premiered at the Ensemble Theatre in Sydney in October 2025.
