= Flagfall =

Expression for a fixed fee originating in Australia

Flagfall, or flag fall, is a common Australian expression for a fixed start fee, especially in the taxi, haulage, railway, and toll road industries. For example, Sydney's WestConnex motorways charge such a fee. From the Australian mobile phone industry, the expression has recently begun to spread to other English-language countries as business jargon for an initial fixed fee for establishing each phone call. The logic behind it is believed to be a method used by Australian mobile phone companies to recover a component of the carriage charges that they incur in completing a call to a subscriber. Called termination rates, they are based on the price terms and conditions for the mobile terminating access service (MTAS). The Australian Competition & Consumer Commission is reviewing such arrangements.

The expression is also beginning to find its way into other businesses as a synonym to "start fee". The taxi expression is also being used in Hong Kong, New Zealand, and some other countries, but it has not been used there as a general synonym for a start fee.

== Origin ==
“Flagfall” is a taxi word that means the minimum cost for hiring a taxi. When the taxi meter is started, your cost starts at the flag fall value, and increases with distance travelled or time taken.

When the passenger steps inside the taxicab, the flagfall condition is triggered and the taxicab driver can start the taximeter. Even if the passenger has not yet instructed the driver where to go, the driver is entitled to the flagfall and the rate per minute component even if the taxi is not moving. The term "flagfall" dates back to the old mechanical taximeters, which were equipped with a flag-like lever that could be seen from outside the cab. When the "flag" was up and visible, the cab was not occupied. When a passenger stepped in, the driver turned the lever down, the "flag fall", and the taximeter started counting. In Australia, once the taximeter is counting, there are orange tariff indicator lights on the taxi head sign that light up to show that the taxicab is hired.

== See also ==
- Trackage rights
