= AustralianSuper =

Australian superannuation and pension fund

- Company type: Mutual fund
- Industry: Superannuation
- Predecessors: Australian Retirement Fund (ARF); Superannuation Trust of Australia (STA)
- Founded: 1 July 2006; 19 years ago
- Headquarters: Melbourne, Victoria, Australia
- Key people: Paul Schroder (CEO); Mark Delaney (Deputy CEO and CIO)
- AUM: ▲ A$385 billion (2025)
- Members: ▲3.5 million (2025)
- Number of employees: 2,078 (2025)
- Website: www.australiansuper.com

AustralianSuper is an Australian superannuation fund headquartered in Melbourne, Victoria. It is an industry super fund, and so operates through a mutual fund structure.

With over A$385 billion of retirement savings under management and more than 3.5 million members, AustralianSuper is the largest superannuation fund in Australia and the sixteenth largest pension fund in the world.

== History ==
AustralianSuper was established on 1 July 2006 through the merger of Australian Retirement Fund (ARF) and Superannuation Trust of Australia (STA). Ian Silk, who was the CEO of ARF, became the CEO of AustralianSuper; while Mark Delaney, who was the CEO of STA, became the Deputy CEO and CIO of AustralianSuper.

In June 2022, Labour Union Co-operative Retirement Fund (LUCRF) Super was merged into AustralianSuper. In September 2023, AustralianSuper invested $1.5 billion into Vantage Data Centres. Also in September, The Australian securities regulator issued a lawsuit against AustralianSuper, claiming the fund failed to uphold appropriate policies for identifying members who had multiple accounts.

In November 2023, it bought significantly more shares in order to oppose a deal for Origin Energy, one of Australia's largest energy companies, to be bought by Brookfield Renewable Partners, potentially blocking the deal. This deal would have led to "a big transition, shutting down coal, getting rid of gas, (and) building up 14 gigawatts of wind and storage" which was more than the Commonwealth's renewable energy target. They felt the deal undervalued the company, despite it being higher than independent valuations, and also refused to join the deal.

In January 2024, AustralianSuper raised its stake in lithium miner Pilbara Minerals and Endeavour Group.

== Features ==
AustralianSuper offers a 'Member Direct' option, allowing users greater control in selecting a portfolio of Australian shares, ETF's, term deposits and cash. The member direct option was designed for the purpose of competing with SMSF options. The fund has a MySuper authority. The fund's trustee is owned jointly by the Australian Council of Trade Unions, and employer peak body Australian Industry Group.

AustralianSuper's asset portfolio is invested globally, and includes shares, transport infrastructure, office blocks, and shopping centres. The fund owns two-thirds of London's Kings Cross Central development.

== Controversies ==
In 2021, the fund was criticised by the AFR for forcing subscriptions to The New Daily onto its members, unless opted out within one-month. The paper was designed and funded by the Industry Super Holdings.

In 2022, the company launched a new digital platform including a new online portal and mobile phone applications. The updates were met with severe criticism as members were unable to access their accounts and were unable to get any answers from the customer support portals.

== See also ==
- Superannuation in Australia
