= Ian Silk =

Australian businessman

- Born: 1957 or 1958 (age 68–69)

Ian Silk is an Australian business executive.

== Career ==
Silk worked as a forklift driver briefly, before working as a senior state government public servant.

His first role in the super industry was obtained with the assistance of Bill Kelty, secretary of the ACTU. He was later appointed chief executive of AustralianSuper, a role he held for 15 years.

Under Silk's tenure, AustralianSuper's nominal funds under management grew from $21 billion to $225 billion. He took the fund from a 'small fry born of compulsory superannuation legislation in the 1990s to a major global player.

Following his retirement from the super industry, Ian was appointed to the boards of Hawthorn Football Club and Crown Melbourne. His appointment to Crown was supported by its new owner, Blackstone.

== Personal life ==
Silk has children.

His brother Gary Silk was a victim of the Silk–Miller police murders.

== See also ==
- Industry Super
- Australian Labor Party
