= Steve Tappin =

British leadership coach (born 1966)

- Born: 5 September 1966 (age 59); Harrogate, Yorkshire, England
- Occupations: Businessman, author

Stephen Elliot Tappin (commonly known as Steve Tappin; born 5 September 1966), is a British leadership coach, author and the co-founder/CEO of Beyond Unity.

Tappin is also an expert on China and a consultant to both Chinese leaders and Western companies in China. He is the co-author of The Awareness Code and The Secrets of CEOs and Dream to Last - Secrets of Chinese CEOs.

He was the host of the BBC television series CEO Guru, where he interviewed CEOs of the largest and fastest growing companies.

== Early life ==
Tappin was born in Harrogate, England on 5 September 1966. He earned a Master of Business Administration from Cranfield University.

== Career ==
Tappin began his career with the chemical company ICI, on a management training scheme. In his late 20s and early 30s, he worked for KPMG, PA Consulting and Heidrick and Struggles. He noticed these global professional services firms faced similar challenges to the major corporations they advised, and this motivated Tappin to create Beyond Unity (formerly known as Xinfu) since 2008.

Tappin is Co-Author of The Awareness Code, and The Secrets of CEOs. In memory of his mother Sylvia, Tappin has set up a charitable trust for cancer research.

=== CEO Guru ===
In 2013, Tappin became host of the BBC business programme, CEO Guru.The show was aired internationally on BBC World News. The program included short films on the topic of management and web articles on BBC websites. As part of the program Tappin interviewed business figures such as Richard Branson, John Mackey, and Guo Guangchang. In addition, Tappin documented the China Entrepreneur Club, a club made up of China’s top business leaders, for the BBC TV documentary China’s Billionaires’ Club.

== Publications ==
- Tappin, Steve; Cave, Andrew (2008). The Secrets of CEOs: 150 Global Chief Executives Lift the Lid on Business, Life and Leadership. London: Nicholas Brealey. ISBN 978-1-85788-513-2. OCLC 221149587.
- Tappin, S. & CEC. (2013). Dream to Last - Secrets of Chinese CEOs. Beijing University Press.
- Linton, Wayne; Tappin, Steve (2021). The Awareness Code. Bloomsbury Publishing. ISBN 978-1-472-99207-9.
