= Birkett =

Birkett, variant: Birket is an English topographic surname, from birk(e) + he(ve)d, haved, for a person who lived in/by a birch-covered headland. The surname is associated with the hereditary title Baron Birkett in the Peerage of the United Kingdom. Surnames of the same etymology include: Birchead, Birchhead, Birkhead, Birckhead, Birkenhead, Burkhead.

Notable people with the name include:

== Surname ==
- Arthur Birkett (1875–1941), English cricketer
- Bill Birkett, British nature writer and photographer
- Cliff Birkett (1933–1997), English footballer
- Dea Birkett (born 1958), British writer
- Glenn W. Birkett (1888–1950), American politician and farmer
- Joe Birkett (born 1955), the DuPage County State's Attorney and former Republican nominee for Illinois Lieutenant Governor
- Lionel Birkett (1905–1998), West Indian Barbadian cricketer
- Myles Birkett Foster (1825–1899), watercolour artist in the Victorian period
- Norman Birkett, 1st Baron Birkett (1883–1962), British barrister and judge
- Ralph Birkett (1913–2002), English footballer
- Reg Birkett (1849–1898), English footballer
- Rowena Birkett (1860–1915) Australian scientific illustrator and artist
- Thomas Birkett (1844–1920), mayor of Ottawa, Canada in 1891 and a member of the Canadian House of Commons representing Ottawa City from 1900 to 1904
- Thomas Miles Birkett (1872–?), Ontario merchant and political figure
- William Birkett (cricketer) (1874–1934), English cricketer
- Zoe Birkett (born 1985), one of the youngest contestants on the ITV show Pop Idol

== Given name ==
- Birkett D. Fry (1822–1891), an adventurer, soldier, lawyer, cotton manufacturer, and a Confederate general in the American Civil War
