= Birkenhead (disambiguation) =

Birkenhead is a town on the Wirral Peninsula, in north west England.

- Birkenhead (UK Parliament constituency), related constituency
- Birkenhead and Tranmere (ward), current Wirral Council ward (2004–present)
- Birkenhead (ward), Wirral Council ward (1980–2004)

Birkenhead may also refer to:

In places:

- Birkenhead, New Zealand, a suburb in North Shore, Auckland, New Zealand
  - Birkenhead (New Zealand electorate), related constituency
- Birkenhead, South Australia, a suburb of Adelaide
- Birkenhead Peak, British Columbia, Canada, and these nearby places:
  - Birkenhead River
  - Birkenhead Lake Provincial Park, northwest of Birkenhead Peak and Gates Lake
- Birkenhead Rock, near Gansbaai, Western Cape, South Africa, on which HMS Birkenhead (1845) was wrecked
- Birkenhead, Western Cape, a populated place near Gansbaai in South Africa
- Birkenhead Point, New South Wales, a point in Sydney, Australia

In ships:

- HMS Birkenhead (1845), an iron-hulled troopship launched in 1845 and notably wrecked in 1852 with the loss of 450 lives
- HMS Birkenhead (1915), a Town-class light cruiser launched in 1915, in action at the Battle of Jutland, and sold in 1921

In people:

- Bishop of Birkenhead, an episcopal title
- Earl of Birkenhead, an extinct title in the Peerage of the United Kingdom
  - F. E. Smith, 1st Earl of Birkenhead (1872–1930), British Conservative politician, Lord High Chancellor (1919–1922)
  - Frederick Smith, 2nd Earl of Birkenhead (1907–1975), British biographer and Member of the House of Lords
  - Frederick Smith, 3rd Earl of Birkenhead (1936–1985), British writer, historian and hereditary peer
- John Birkenhead (c. 1617–1679), British political writer and journalist
- Lillian Birkenhead (1905–1979), British swimmer
- Richie Birkenhead (born 1965), American rock musician and creative director
- Susan Birkenhead, American lyricist
- Frank Field, Baron Field of Birkenhead (1942–2024), British Labour politician

In other uses:

- The Birkenhead drill, the marine evacuation protocol originated during the sinking of HMS Birkenhead (1845)

== See also ==
- Birkenhead Point Factory Outlet Centre, a shopping centre in Sydney, Australia
- Birken, British Columbia, whose name is derived from the Birkenhead River and the adjacent Birkenhead Peak
