= Birkhead =

Birkhead is an English topographic surname, see "Birkett" for its etymology and similar surnames. Notable people with the surname include:

- Dannielynn Birkhead (born 2006), Bahamanian-born person, subject of the Birkhead v. Marshall paternity case
- Edith Birkhead, lecturer in English Literature at the University of Bristol and a Noble Fellow at the University of Liverpool
- George Birkhead (died 1614), English Roman Catholic priest, archpriest in England from 1608
- Harry Birkhead (died 2013), South African philatelist
- Henry Birkhead (1617–1696), English academic, lawyer and Latin poet
- Leon Milton Birkhead (1885–1954), American Unitarian minister
- Martin Birkhead (died 1590), English politician
- May Birkhead (1882–1941), American fashion and society reporter
- Tim Birkhead, Professor of Zoology at the University of Sheffield and author

== See also ==
- Burkhead
