= Birkenhead ferry wharf =

Disused ferry wharf in Sydney

Birkenhead
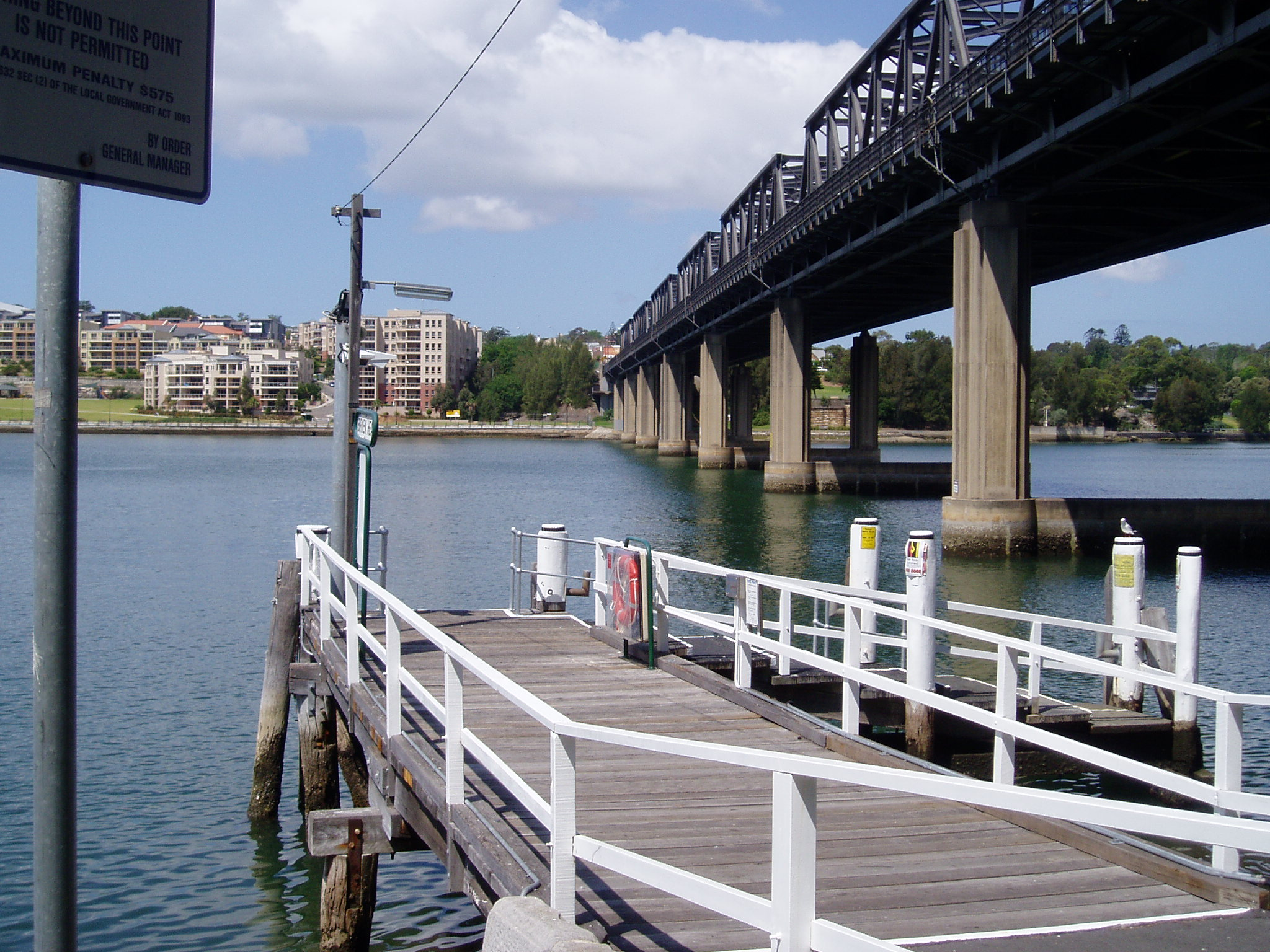
- Wharf in January 2007 with the Iron Cove Bridge adjacent

General information
- Location: Henley Marine Drive, Drummoyne; New South Wales; Australia
- Coordinates: 33°51′21″S 151°09′47″E
- Owner: Transport for NSW
- Platforms: 1

History
- Former names: Birkenhead Point
Location

Birkenhead ferry wharf is located on Iron Cove serving the Sydney suburb of Birkenhead Point. From November 1994 until October 2010, It was served by Sydney Ferries Parramatta River services operating from Circular Quay.

Birkenhead Wharf is located adjacent to the Iron Cove Bridge and close to Birkenhead Point Outlet Centre.

== Transport links ==
A bus stop exists nearby on Victoria Road, about a two-minute walk away. Busways services run from the city to West Ryde and Parramatta.
