= Birket (surname) =

Birket is an English topographic surname, see "Birkett" for its etymology and similar surnames. Notable people with the surname include:

- Bob Birket (1874–1933), English footballer
- Kaj Birket-Smith (1893–1977), Danish philologist and anthropologist
- Myles Birket Foster (1825–1899), English illustrator, watercolourist and engraver
