= Burkhead =

Burkhead is an English-language surname. It is either a variant of Birkhead or an Americanized form of "Burkhart" or cognates. Notable people with the surname include:

- Lisa Cano Burkhead, American politician and educator
- Mike Burkhead, American football player
- Rex Burkhead (born 1990), American football player

== See also ==
- 9143 Burkhead, minor planet named after Martin S. Burkhead (born 1933), emeritus professor at Indiana University
