= Birckhead =

Birckhead is an English topographic surname, see "Birkett" for its etymology and similar surnames. Notable people with the surname include:

- Edmund Birckhead Bensell (1842–1894), U.S. artist and illustrator
- Fannie Birckhead (1935–2022), U.S. community organizer, judge, and politician
- Janeen L. Birckhead, U.S. military official
