= Birkenhead Point =

Place in Sydney, Australia

Coordinates: 33°51′21″S 151°09′47″E

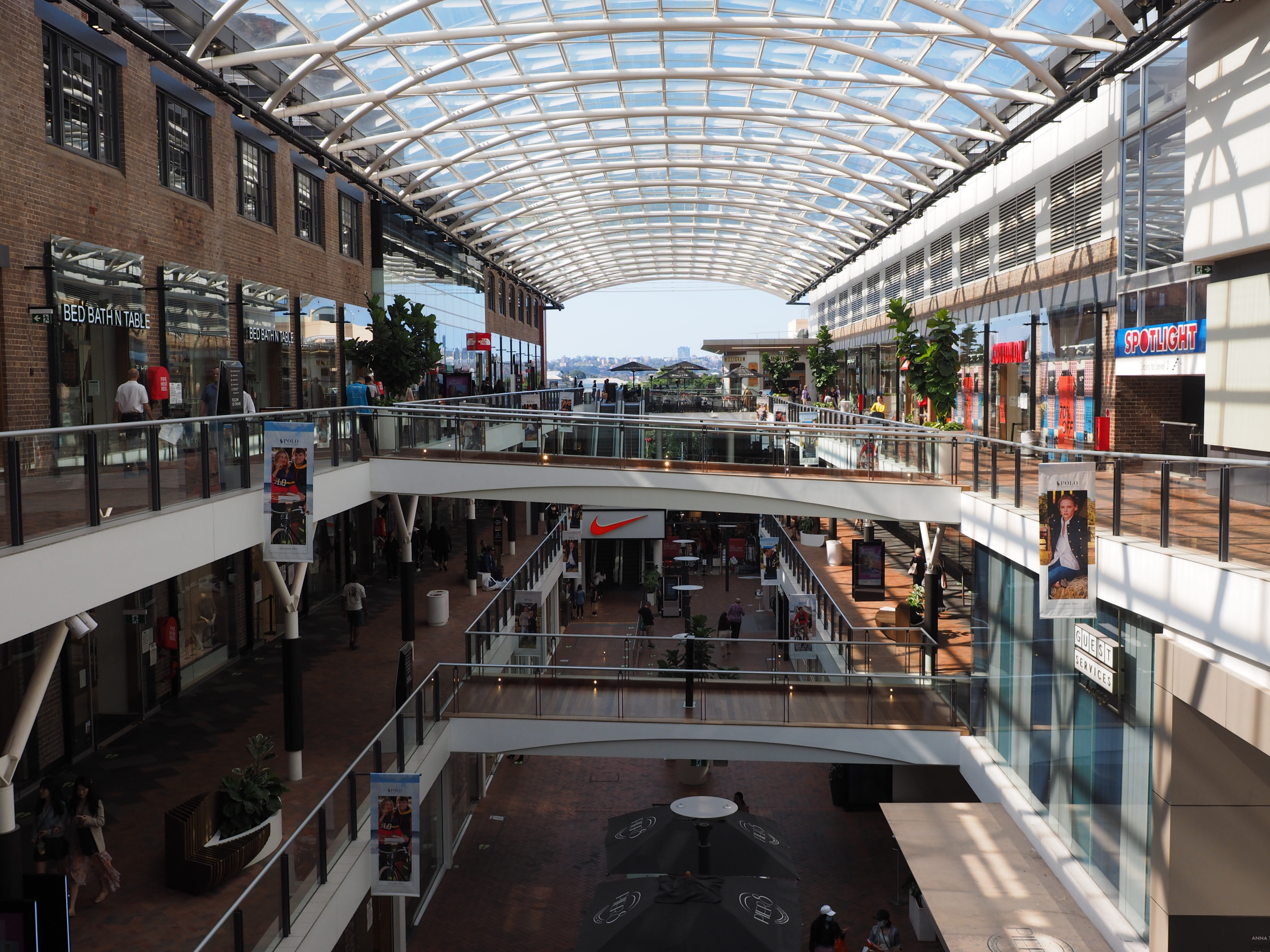
Birkenhead Point Outlet Centre

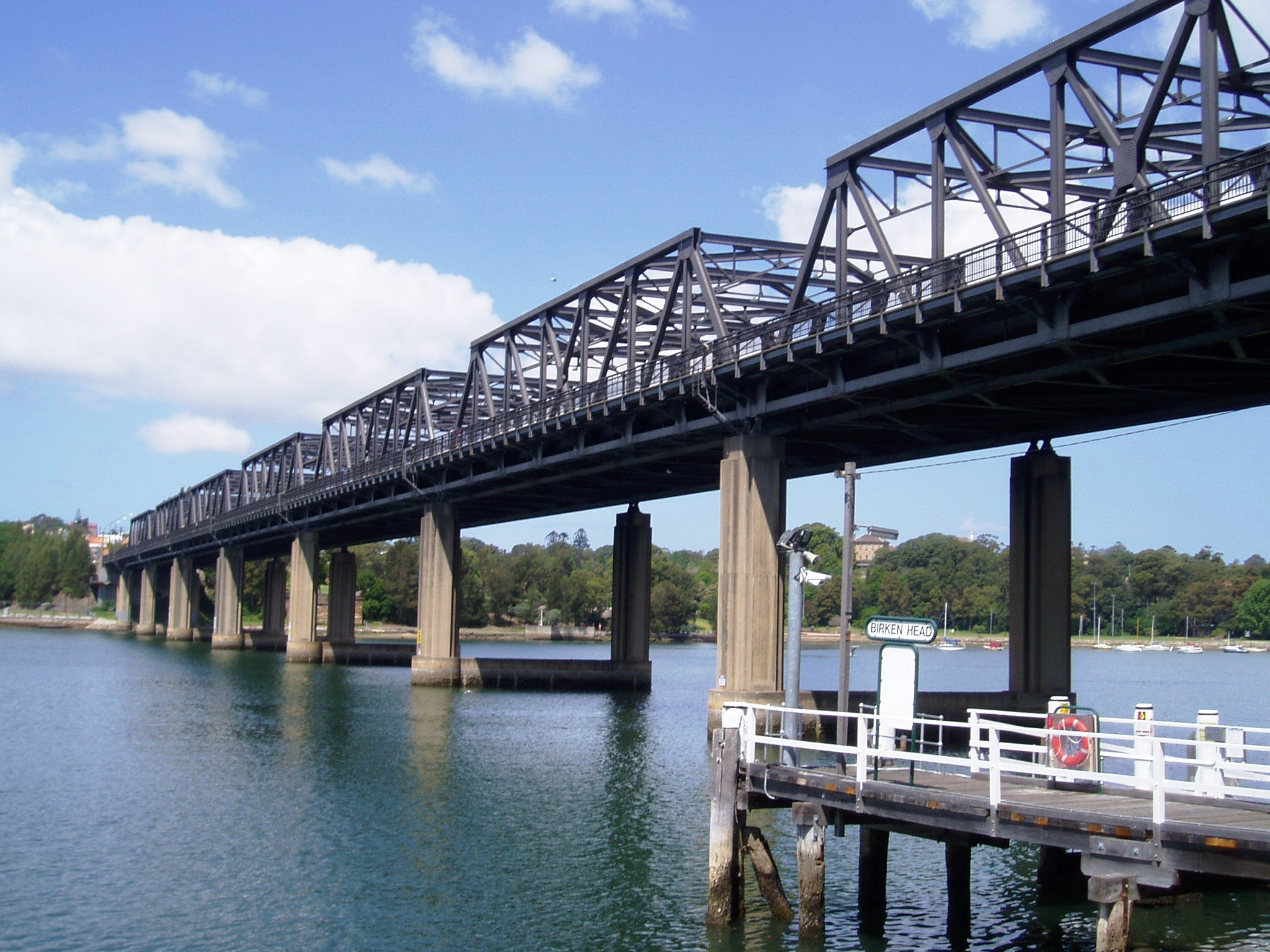
View of Iron Cove Bridge and Birkenhead ferry wharf.

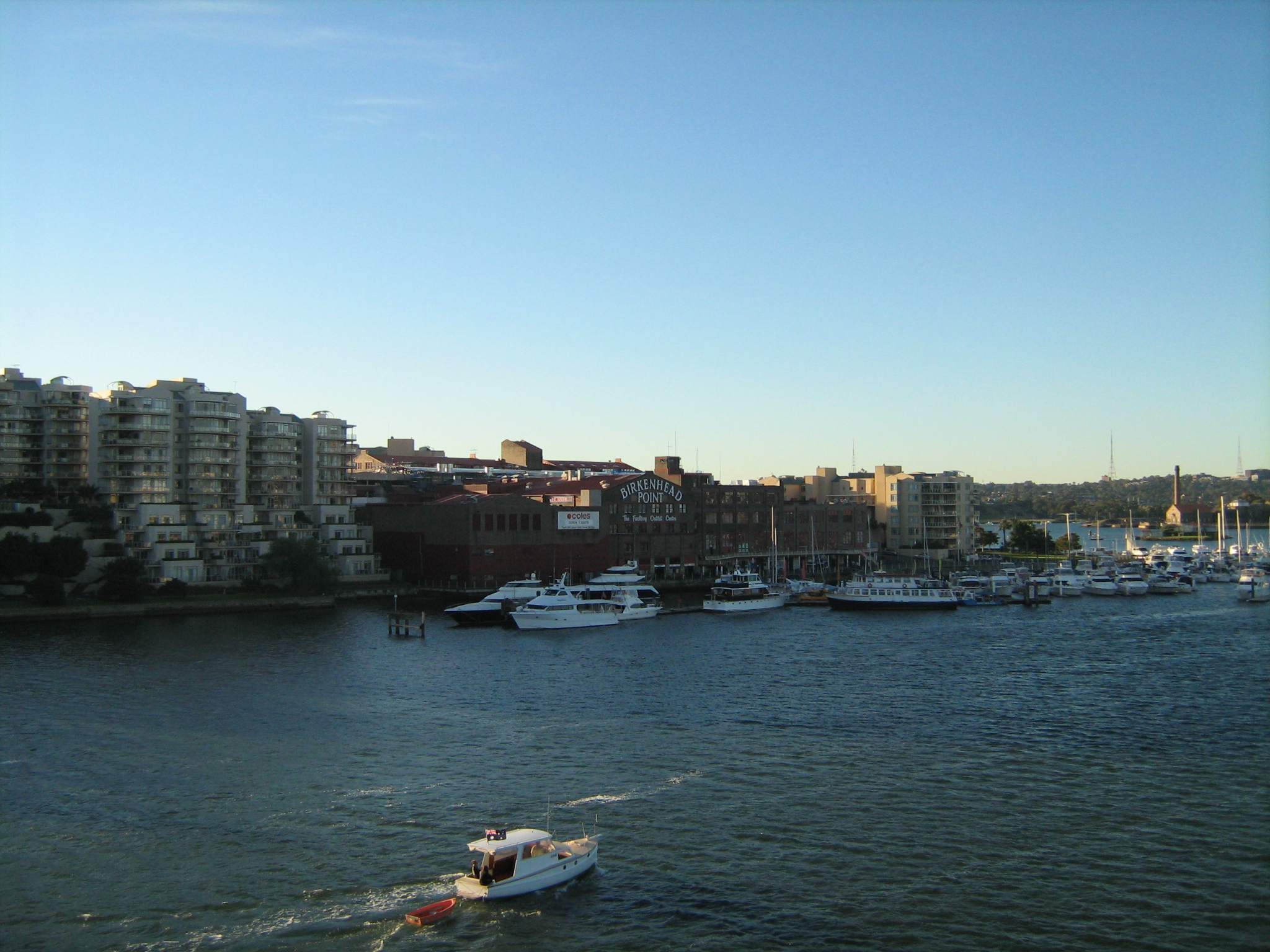
View of Birkenhead Point from the Iron Cove Bridge

Birkenhead Point is a point in Port Jackson, in the suburb of Drummoyne, New South Wales, Australia.

The area was once largely industrial but it is now the home to Birkenhead Point Outlet Centre, marina and apartment complex. Birkenhead ferry wharf provides access to the area, as well as Victoria Road which has up to twenty bus services from the city to major centres further west.

== History ==
In 1844 a salting and boiling down works was established by Charles Abercrombie. In 1900 the Perdriau Brothers set up a rubber importing company, which, as the automobile began to come into fashion, expanded their operation to manufacture rubber tyres. In 1929 Dunlop took over and by the 1960s, 1,600 employees produced tyres at the plant. In 1977 the plant closed down, and the site was redeveloped into a waterfront shopping centre. In the 1990s apartments were added, and the shops made way for designer clothing brand bargain outlet stores. Recent renovations of the shopping complex started in October 2004, and a new floor and glass roof was completed in November 2010.

== Sources ==
- Harbour Circle Notes compiled by Graham Spindler, November 2005, for Planning NSW
- Birkenhead Point Shopping Centre
