= Sewage Pumping Station 27 =

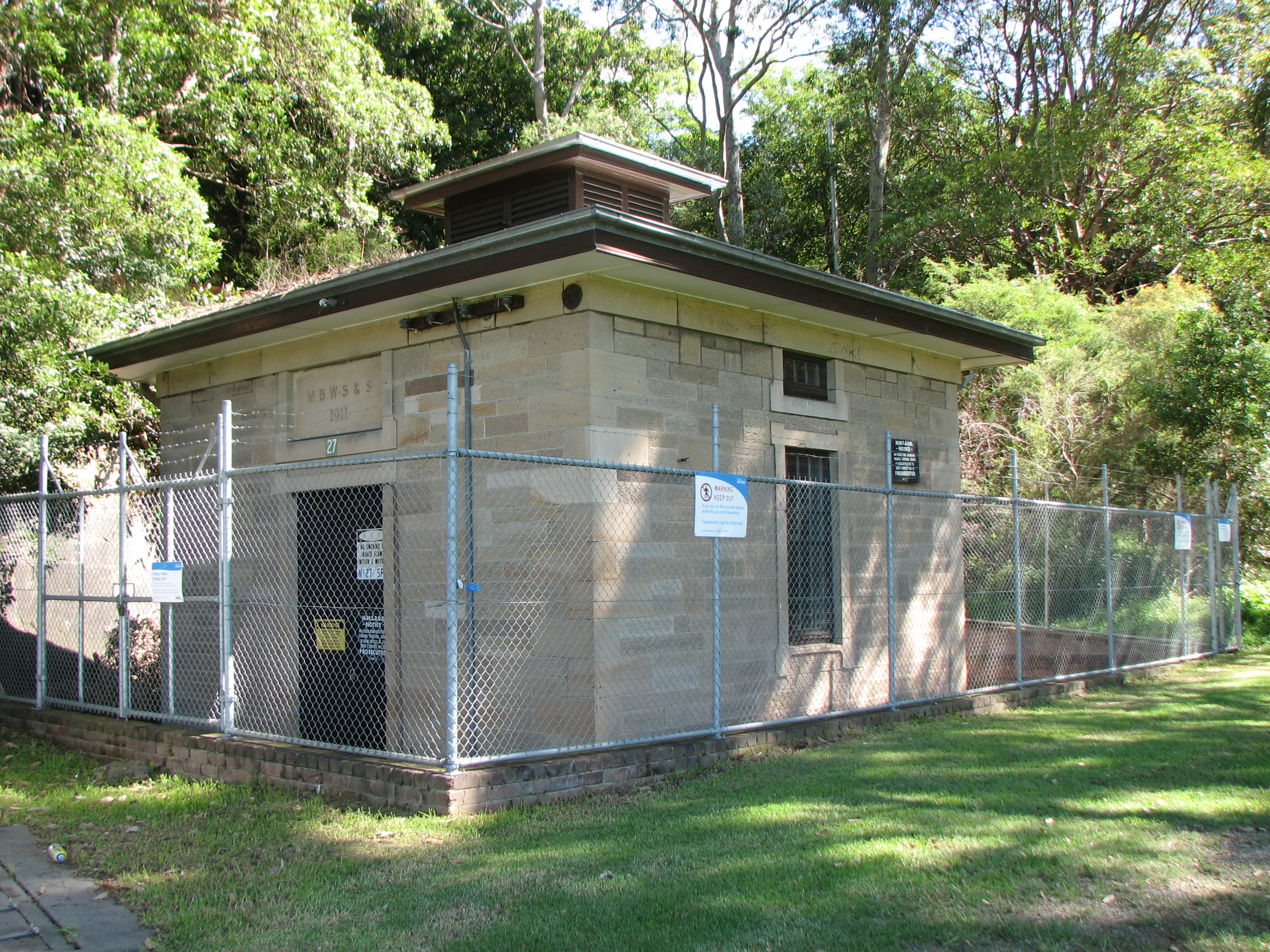
- Sewage Pumping Station 27, Callan Park, Rozelle, New South Wales

- Location within Sydney Location within Australia
- 33.8634°S 151.1617°E
- Location: Callan Park, Rozelle, Inner West Council, Sydney, New South Wales, Australia

Site notes
- Architect(s): Metropolitan Board of Water Supply and Sewerage
- Owner: Sydney Water

New South Wales Heritage Register
- Official name: Sewage Pumping Station 27; SPS 27
- Type: state heritage (built)
- Designated: 18 November 1999
- Reference no.: 1341
- Type: Sewage Pump House/Pumping Station
- Category: Utilities - Sewerage
- Builders: Metropolitan Board of Water Supply and Sewerage

Sewage Pumping Station 27 is a heritage-listed former sewage pumping station situated in Callan Park, Rozelle, Inner West Council, Sydney, New South Wales, Australia. It is also known as SPS 27. The building is located on the southern side of King George Park. The property is owned by Sydney Water. It was added to the New South Wales State Heritage Register on 18 November 1999.

== History ==
In 1873, Sydney Harbour was found to be grossly polluted with water-borne diseases. After a severe outbreak of typhoid fever in 1875 the government created the Sydney City and Suburban Health Board to investigate an alternative means of disposing of the City's growing sewage waste. This led to the construction of the Bondi Ocean Outfall Sewer (BOOS) in 1889, and the creation of the low level sewage pumping station system to transfer sewage against gravitation in low-lying areas around the harbour. Twenty Stations were built in the first generation of LLSPSs late in the 19th century, and in the subsequent development of other Ocean Outfall Sewers to serve the southern, western and northern suburbs, more than 115 pumping stations were in operation by the late 1950s'. The physical manifestations of the first 50 years of this system are the station superstructures, the majority of which are still functioning today.

SPS27 itself was built in 1911–1912 by the Metropolitan Board of Water Supply and Sewerage. It was decommissioned in 1997 after an investigation in the early 1990s revealed that the building was in poor condition and was "at the end of its useful life"; it was replaced by a new station on an adjacent site. Conservation works were undertaken in 2014, reflecting the site's heritage value.

== Description ==
SPS 27 is conventional LLSPS with a concrete substructure and a single storey sandstone superstructure designed in Federation Romanesque. The structure was designed to be sympathetic with the nearby Kirdbridge block of the Callan Park Hospital. Externally, there is a hipped corrugated iron roof and a timber louvered ventilator; boxed eaves; random course picked sandstone walls; multi-paned timber framed fixed sash windows with multi-paned timber framed fixed sash windows with multi-paned fanlights and dressed sandstone surrounds. Entrance consists of a timber framed, ledged and sheeted double opening door with original hasp and staple, keeper and top/bottom bolts. Above the door is a recessed sandstone panel inscribed "MBWS & DB 1911". Rainwater goods consist of colourbond gutters and downpipe. Internally there are exposed timber trusses arranged in a cruciform pattern framing the ventilation shaft. Walls are of painted picked sandstone, with rubbed sandstone door and window dressings. There is a brick dwarf wall with a 1.8m cyclone fence surrounding three sides of the site, a fourth side is bounded by a natural sandstone outcrop. There is a small brick toilet enclosure adjacent to the building. The immediate area around the Station has been covered in concreted, and the property overlooks Iron Cove.

It is substantially intact, however several unsympathetic alterations have taken place. A new colourbond roof replaces an original slate roofing. In general, the fabric is marred by a lack of maintenance. The Station has been decommissioned.

== Heritage listing ==
SPS 27 is of historic and aesthetic significance at the local and state level. Its historic value is derived from its original function, which was to serve the Bondi Ocean Outfall Sewer (BOOS). The construction of the BOOS effectively ended the discharge of untreated sewage into Sydney Harbour. It is a rare example of the use of local sandstone as an architectural material in an industrial building designed by the Water Board, and was designed to lend stylistic continuity to the surrounding buildings in the Callan Park complex. In addition, the mechanical components housed within the building have potential industrial archaeological value. The Station is located within a small site adjacent to Eastern Park. The structure thus has a level of aesthetic value which is enhanced by its location in picturesque Iron Cove and contributes significantly to the visual catchment of the surrounding landscape.

Sewage Pumping Station 27 was listed on the New South Wales State Heritage Register on 18 November 1999.
