= Drummoyne Reservoir =

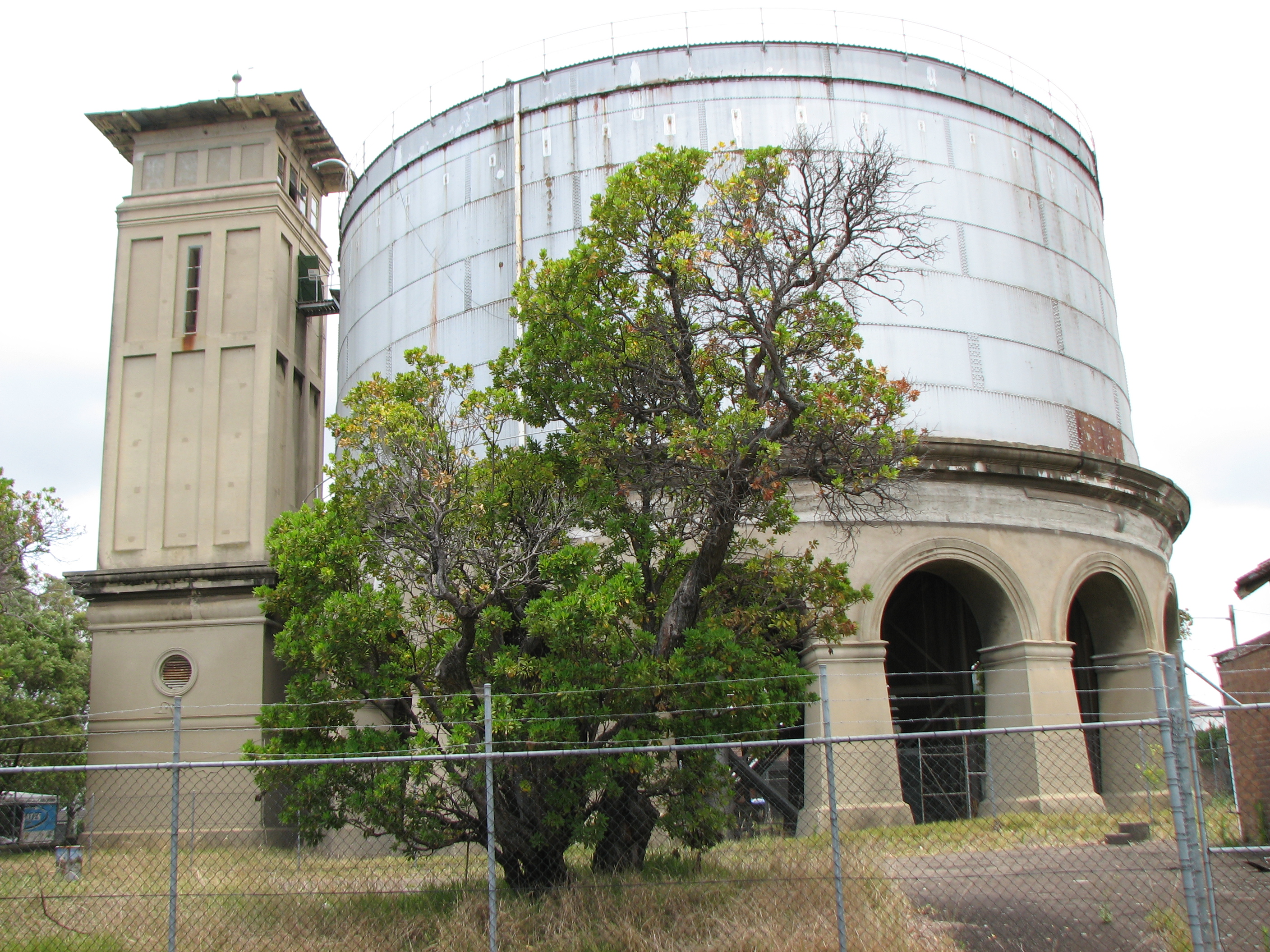
- Drummoyne Reservoir in 2019

- Location within New South Wales Location within Australia
- 33.8553°S 151.1526°E
- Location: Rawson Avenue, Drummoyne, City of Canada Bay, New South Wales, Australia

History
- Built: 1910–1913

Site notes
- Architect(s): Metropolitan Board of Water Supply and Sewerage - J G S Purvis; Design Engineer
- Owner: Sydney Water

New South Wales Heritage Register
- Official name: Drummoyne Reservoir; WS0038; Drummoyne Elevated Steel Reservoir
- Type: state heritage (built)
- Designated: 15 November 2002
- Reference no.: 1625
- Type: Water Supply Reservoir/ Dam
- Category: Utilities - Water
- Builders: Metropolitan Board of Water Supply and Sewerage (Substructure); Poole & Steele Ltd (Tank)

Drummoyne Reservoir is a heritage-listed decommissioned elevated service reservoir located on Rawson Avenue, Drummoyne, New South Wales, a suburb of Sydney, Australia. It was designed by engineer J. G. S. Purvis from the Metropolitan Board of Water Supply and Sewerage and built from 1910 to 1913, with the Board responsible for the construction of the substructure and Poole & Steele Ltd responsible for the tank manufacture. It is also known as WS0038 and Drummoyne Elevated Steel Reservoir. It was added to the New South Wales State Heritage Register on 15 November 2002. Sydney Water sold the property in September 2018 to owners of a chain of childcare centres, who plan to convert the site into a childcare centre while retaining most of the heritage structure.

== History ==
Due to the topographical nature of Sydney, the supply system requires a large number of service tanks and reservoirs which act as a storage buffer between supply and demand and give sufficient head for satisfactory gravity flow to the consumer. The first service reservoirs, built between 1859 and 1899, were brick walled with brick or concrete roofs supported by brick or timber piers and built into the ground. The innovative use of materials and construction methods together with sheer size made these constructions unique in their time. As demand grew for additional storage reservoirs, other types of constructions appeared, along with the introduction of new materials, particularly iron. Between 1888 and 1910, twelve circular reservoirs, the majority of the surface type, were constructed in wrought iron, cast iron and mild steel. The construction of Drummoyne (R38), along with Penshurst Reservoir No. 2, Bellevue Hill and Ashfield Reservoir No. 2 between 1910 and 1914, marked a new phase in the Water Board's reservoir development, with the composite use of reinforced concrete and mild steel setting these reservoirs apart from their predecessors.

The use of reinforced concrete in New South Wales follows from the New South Wales Public Works Department's construction of the Forest Lodge sewerage aqueduct over White's Creek, for the Metropolitan Board of Water Supply and Sewerage in 1895. The first reinforced concrete water tank on the Monier system was a service reservoir built in 1899 at Kiama, NSW. The Sydney Water Board followed with two service reservoirs built of reinforced concrete at Liverpool in 1901 and at Randwick (covered) in 1910. Following this (1910–1913) the Board constructed the four elevated steel reservoirs on reinforced concrete slabs, at Bellevue Hill, Ashfield, Drummoyne and Penshurst. These reservoirs were the Water Board's first to combine the use of mild steel and reinforced concrete, with reinforced concrete forming the floor, outer columns and arches of the elevated reservoirs whilst mild steel was used for the walls and extra support columns.

The Drummoyne Reservoir was built from 1910 to 1914. The 1913 Handbook of the Metropolitan Board of Water Supply and Sewerage gives the following description:

"Drummoyne Elevated Tank T.W.L.: 168.00ft; capacity: 1,000,000 gallons; depth of water: 32ft. This is an open elevated steel tank, 80ft, diameter, erected on concrete arches and steel stanchions and girders, with a reinforced concrete floor, situated in Rawson Avenue, Drummoyne. It is filled with gravitation water from Potts Hill, and acts as a storage and balance reservoir for Drummoyne. A square Tower or campanile has been attached to the front of this tank for ornamental purposes, and is utilised as a stairway to top of tank".

The Reservoir is associated with Sir Thomas Henley KBE, MP (1860-1935) who was an alderman for the Municipality of Drummoyne from 1898 to 1934 and was four times mayor. Henley was a tireless promoter of Drummoyne, and saw the tramline extended to Drummoyne (1902), its sewerage planned (1903), reticulation sewers laid (1910), electricity supply introduced (1910) and a beginning to road sealing (1916). He is referred to as the "father of modern Drummoyne". Henley encouraged the MWS & DB to construct balance reservoirs in the higher parts of Sydney. On a motion by him (1909), the Board directed the Engineer-in-Chief to report on providing balance reservoirs in each suburb and take steps to acquire the necessary sites. Within two weeks, a site was selected in Drummoyne and a valuation approved by the Board. It is reported that Henley was instrumental in having a tower built alongside the Drummoyne Reservoir because he had heard that Bellevue Hill reservoir was to have a tower and did not want the reservoir in his suburb to look second best. The tower at Bellevue Hill, though, had been added at the request of the military authorities, who were interested in having a lookout tower and signal relay station (for semaphores) in this vicinity.

Various modifications have been made over the years. In 1940, the openings to the belvedere upper section were infilled with sash windows. In 1970, the sash windows in belvedere were removed and the openings bricked-up. In the early 1960s the Metropolitan Board of Water Supply and Sewerage instituted a policy of roofing all of its 160 existing reservoirs. The metal-deck roof was added in 1975, with the associated safety railing to the catwalk. The office building has been altered several times, though no dates are known.

The reservoir was formally disconnected from the system in 1994. It was used for some years as a training facility on chlorination technique but has been disused since the mid-1990s.

== Description ==
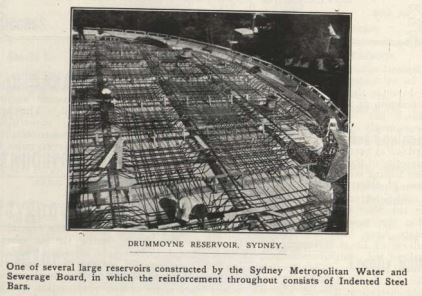
Drummoyne Reservoir under construction as featured in advertisement for William Adams and Company 1913

The Reservoir is a large circular steel tank mounted upon a circular concrete slab which is supported above the ground on an inner grid of steel columns and girders and an outer ring of arched concrete columns.

The tank is 80 feet (24.6 m) in diameter and 40 feet (12.3 m) in height, formed of seven rings of riveted steel plate. Horizontal joints have a single row of rivets; vertical joints are four rivets wide but are more widely spaced towards the bottom of the tank. The plates are lap-jointed horizontally and butt-jointed vertically, with fishplates over each vertical joint carrying the rivets.

The top of the Reservoir has been roofed using profile steel cladding (in 1975). Associated with this is a steel pipe handrail erected around the outside of the top of the tank wall. Approximately one metre below the top of the tank is the original encircling catwalk, using a timber deck carried on angle-section steel struts on the outer side. This catwalk also has a metal pipe handrail. The east side of the tank has a water level indicator, comprising an indicator board marked in heights and a small red arrow which slides vertically along the board, driven by a cable to a float within the Reservoir.

The support structure for the steel tank comprises a circular concrete slab carried on a combination of mass concrete columns around the outer edge and within these, a grid of steel joists carried on a braced network of steel posts.

The floor of the Reservoir tank is an in-situ cast, reinforced concrete slab, 24 inches (0.61 m) thick at the outer edge, reducing on the top side only to 18 inches (0.46 m) at the centrepoint, where the scupper drain is located. The slab incorporates an expansion joint for the metal tank walls using a bituminous coated lead ring gasket. Reinforcement within the slab uses 0.75 inch (19.2 mm) square section indented steel bars laid in a grid and tied at crossings with 20 Gauge iron wire. There are three 18 inch (0.46 m) diameter pipes which penetrate the slab, in addition to the scupper drain. These are the inlet, outlet and overflow lines.

There are twenty-four steel columns on a square grid with two extra on the centre of each side. Each column is built up of 24 inch by 7.5 inch (615 mm by 192 mm) and 12 inch by 7.5 inch (307 mm by 192 mm) steel angle sections riveted together and cross-braced with 5.5 inch by 5.5 inch (140 mm by 140 mm) angle section beams. The columns carry 24 inch by 7.5 inch (615 mm by 192 mm) rolled steel joists which carry the slab and also bear onto 24 inch by 7.5 inch (615 mm by 192 mm) crown girders which connect the tops of the outer concrete columns and are fully embedded within the concrete. The sixteen concrete columns are of mass concrete, poured in-situ over concrete foundations and covered and detailed in concrete render. They are square in plan and taper from the base to a cornice at the spring line for the semicircular arches which connect each column. The arches each have a moulded archivolt and above these is a heavily moulded cornice around the exterior of the concrete slab. The steel tank walls spring from the concrete slab approximately 4.5 feet (1.4 m) in from the outer edge of the cornice, leaving a walkway around the outside of the tank. A metal pipe handrail is mounted on the outer edge of the cornice for safety purposes.

Specifications

- Capacity: 1 million gallons (4.5 Ml)
- Top Water Level (above sea level): 168 feet (51.2 m)
- Depth of Water: 31 feet (9.5 m)
- Diameter of Tank: 80 feet (24.3 m)

=== The Reservoir Tower ===
The Reservoir tower is located on the south-east side of the Reservoir, facing Rawson Avenue. It is square in plan, rising from a tapered plinth, and has moulded cornices which form string courses at door lintel level (corresponding to the springline cornices of the Reservoir arches), at the first stair landing level (corresponding to the cornice of the concrete slab of the Reservoir) and near the top, at the level corresponding to the top of the tank. Above this top cornice is the belvedere level and roof.

The lowest section detailed above has plain rendered walls on three faces; the other contains the entrance door. The door is fronted by a set of five concrete steps, with elegant moulded wing walls which each have short end piers. The single door with one rectangular toplight is contained within a heavily moulded architrave, the moulding of which continues above the string course cornice as the moulded archivolt over the door. The area below the arch is plain rendered above the cornice and there is a moulded keystone to the archivolt. On the southern side of the door, outside of the architrave, is a trachyte Inscription Tablet 3 feet (0.9 m) high and 2.5 feet (0.77 m) wide containing the name MWS & S in full, the year date and the names of the members of the Board.

The second tower section above ground contains the archivolt above the entry door on the front facade and a singular circular louvred opening in the centre of each of the adjacent side facades. Each circular opening is surrounded by a moulding similar to the cornice mouldings used elsewhere. This section terminates at the cornice moulding corresponding to the base of the steel tank.

The next tower section has identical details to all four sides, except on the tank side where it is broken by central door openings on two levels. The lower door connects by a short ramp to the walkway around the bottom of the tank; the upper door has a short steel bridge to the walkway which encircles the top of the tank. Otherwise these facades are broken by six vertically aligned rectangular recessed panels, the upper three being half as high as the lower three. The central upper recess on three facades has a tall, narrow, unglazed opening in its centre, with a metal mesh added to its exterior. On the fourth facade, this is the location of the upper level door to the catwalk around the top of the tank.

The tower terminates in a belvedere, with a low-pitch pyramidal roof clad in rolled lead sheet. It features exposed rafters below timber board lining. The belvedere originally had four rectangular openings on each side but these are now bricked up and rendered to appear as blind window recesses. The central kingpost of the roof protrudes through the roof and is topped by an elaborate wind vane and lightning rod.

Internally, the tower contains a reinforced concrete stair cantilevered from the outer walls, with landings at the door openings to the Reservoir and a wrought-iron balustrade. Valves for the inlet/outlet pipelines from the Reservoir are located beneath the tower floor. The tower is not rendered internally, the exposed brickwork being laid in English Bond.

The water reservoir and attached tower are intact and unaltered. The lead seals require replacement if water is to be readmitted into the tank. The office building has modified windows and interior.

No longer required for water storage, the conservation of the reservoir presents several challenges.

== Heritage listing ==
The Drummoyne Reservoir is one of a group of four water supply service reservoirs (Bellevue Hill (WS0010), Penshurst No.2 (WS0087) & Ashfield (WS0002)) built as part of the Sydney metropolitan water supply system. The group represents a series of important technological and historic developments, being the first elevated service reservoirs of over 0.5Ml capacity built, the first reservoirs to combine steel tank walls with reinforced concrete floors and the first to be built using the Monier concrete reinforcement system. The deliberate ornamentation and stylisation in the individual designs of each reservoir demonstrates the intention of the Board to produce landmark structures which harmonised with their immediate environment.

Drummoyne was one of two reservoirs built with an attached tower and was the only reservoir in the group to feature a tower as a deliberate ornament. It is now the only reservoir with its tower surviving. The combined tower and reservoir is a fine, well-designed Federation Free Classical structure and a local landmark which complements the architectural character of the vicinity. The provision of the tower is associated with Sir Thomas Henley, a prominent local identity and politician who was also a member of the Board of Water Supply and Sewerage and who had been instrumental in the provision of these Reservoirs.

Drummoyne Reservoir was listed on the National Trust of Australia register in 2000, the City of Canada Bay Heritage Schedule and the Heritage Act - s.170 NSW State agency heritage register in 2000. The Reservoir was listed on the New South Wales State Heritage Register on 15 November 2002 having satisfied the following criteria.

The place is important in demonstrating the course, or pattern, of cultural or natural history in New South Wales.

The Drummoyne Reservoir is one of a group of four water supply service reservoirs which together represent an important technological development in the use of reinforced concrete for reservoirs in NSW.

The group of four elevated steel and reinforced concrete reservoirs is the first group of large (over 0.5 Ml) water storage reservoirs built above ground level as part of the metropolitan water supply system, allowing gravity reticulation to the highest land areas. This was a major improvement in supply and an important developmental stage in the provision of water supply in Sydney.

Drummoyne Reservoir provides evidence of the extent of urban development in its service area at the time of its construction, both by the selection of its locality and its size.

Drummoyne Reservoir's history of usage, leading to its current redundancy within the Water Supply system, is illustrative of the growth of Sydney and the corresponding development of the water supply network over this period.

Drummoyne Reservoir provides evidence of the cultural philosophy prevalent at the time of its construction, whereby there was a conscious effort by public authorities to integrate the appearance of mundane, functional structures into the aesthetic context of the community. This is in contrast to the late twentieth century trend towards cost-based "functionalist" design for such structures.

The design of Drummoyne Reservoir illustrates the Victorian and early twentieth century attitude that the provision of public infrastructure was evidence of cultural and material progress and that the arrival of such structures within a community was a matter of achievement. The boldness of its landmark design qualities and the attention to the aesthetic details of its fabric show the pride and confidence of the designers and their supervisors. The names of these people are unashamedly displayed upon the relatively elaborate inscription tablet mounted at the entrance to the Reservoir tower.

The tower of the Drummoyne Reservoir is associated with the activities of Sir Thomas Henley, the most influential figure in the development of the Drummoyne area, a prominent public identity in the city and a member of the Board of Water Supply and Sewerage. This association is redolent with social inferences about money, power and influence in the administration of New South Wales, whilst also recording the enormous contribution that certain individuals make to their communities during their lifetimes.

The place is important in demonstrating aesthetic characteristics and/or a high degree of creative or technical achievement in New South Wales.

The Drummoyne Reservoir and tower is a prominent skyline feature and a landmark in its area. It is visible in all directions for a considerable distance. The Drummoyne Reservoir is a simple, functional structure which has been designed with deliberate architectural stylisation. The tower and arched substructure are fine examples of Federation Free Classical architecture, one of the styles in vogue at the time of its construction. The surrounding area experienced a surge in development through the same period, with tram services and sewerage following major subdivisions of the area between 1881 and 1901. The architecture of the Reservoir is closely linked to the architecture which characterises the vicinity and the Reservoir forms a complementary element in the townscape of Drummoyne.

The tower of the Drummoyne Reservoir is a major feature which, by its height and proximity to the Reservoir tank, interrupts the bulk and rectangularity of the tank when viewed from almost any direction, but especially from east and west. This effect reduces the visual impact of the tank on the skyline and harmonises the structure with the visual appearance of the built environment in which it is located. Overall, the Drummoyne Reservoir is an aesthetically pleasing structure. It has style and character, good proportions and demonstrates attention to detail both in design and construction. Its scale is in proportion to its context and its materials and finishes are typical of the building materials common in the area.

The place has strong or special association with a particular community or cultural group in New South Wales for social, cultural or spiritual reasons.

The Drummoyne Reservoir is valued by industrial heritage aficionados in particular for its historical, technological and aesthetic qualities. This is evidenced by its entry in the National Trust Register, Water Board Heritage List and local Council Heritage Schedule.

The place has potential to yield information that will contribute to an understanding of the cultural or natural history of New South Wales.

The Drummoyne Reservoir, along with the Penshurst, Bellevue Hill and Ashfield Reservoirs, has potential scientific value in the analysis of the long-term performance of its construction method. Its present redundancy may contribute varied or comparative data in relation to the other three Reservoirs, all of which remain in service.

The place possesses uncommon, rare or endangered aspects of the cultural or natural history of New South Wales.

The Drummoyne Reservoir is one of only four large water supply service reservoirs in the metropolitan system which are elevated and combine steel tank walls with a reinforced concrete floor.

The group of four reservoirs which includes Drummoyne Reservoir is the first group of elevated water service reservoirs built in-house by the Metropolitan Water Sewerage and Drainage Board to use the Monier concrete reinforcement system.

The Drummoyne Reservoir is the only remaining water supply service reservoir with an attached tower in the metropolitan water supply system. It was originally one of only two such arrangements ever built in Sydney.

The Drummoyne Reservoir tower is the only known example of an attached tower to a reservoir being erected purely for decorative purposes. Drummoyne Reservoir is the only known example of a water supply service reservoir having a direct and close association with a prominent local business and political identity.

The place is important in demonstrating the principal characteristics of a class of cultural or natural places/environments in New South Wales.

The Drummoyne Reservoir is a representative example of the four elevated service reservoirs built between 1910 and 1914 which used a reinforced concrete floor and riveted steel walls.

The role that Drummoyne Reservoir played in the water supply of its vicinity until its redundancy is representative of the function of all service reservoirs throughout the Sydney metropolitan water supply system.

The Drummoyne Reservoir, in its appearance, detailing and the provision of its tower, is representative of a class of historic buildings and structures which demonstrate the care and consideration with which these structures were placed into existing environments at the time of their construction. This consideration indicates that sensitivity to context was an issue of urban amenity then, as well as in the present.

The tower at Drummoyne Reservoir is representative of the form and operation of access towers attached to reservoirs in Sydney.

== See also ==
- Sydney Water
