= Harry Birkhead =

South African philatelist (1931–2013)

Harry Birkhead (1931-2013) was a South African philatelist who signed the Roll of Distinguished Philatelists of South Africa in 1982 and was a Fellow of The Royal Philatelic Society London. He was Honorary Life President of the Philatelic Federation of South Africa.

Harry was a specialist in the stamps and postal history of the Anglo-Boer War and the Rhodesias. His Rhodesian collection was sold by Christie's Robson Lowe in 1986.

== Selected publications ==
- The wherewithal of Wolmaransstad, Philatelic Federation of South Africa, 1999. (With John Groenewald & Richard Stroud) ISBN 0620234997
- The pseudo-siege of Schweizer-Reneke, Philatelic Federation of South Africa, 2005. (With John Groenewald) ISBN 0620334916
- The riddle of Rustenburg, Philatelic Federation of South Africa, 2007. (With John Groenewald) ISBN 0620370092
- The legacy of Lydenburg, Philatelic Federation of South Africa, 2009. (With John Groenewald) ISBN 0620416882
