= Mike Burkhead =

American football quarterback

No. 18, 7
- Position: Quarterback

Personal information
- Listed height: 6 ft 2 in (1.88 m)
- Listed weight: 200 lb (91 kg)

Career information
- High school: South Dade (Homestead, Florida)
- College: Richmond (1984–1986); Florida State (1987)

Career history
- Miami Hooters (1994)

Career AFL statistics
- Comp. / Att.: 58 / 100
- Passing yards: 617
- TD–INT: 9–6
- QB rating: 73.63
- Rushing TDs: 2
- Stats at ArenaFan.com

Michael Burkhead is an American former professional football quarterback who played one season with the Miami Hooters of the Arena Football League (AFL). He played college football at the University of Richmond.

== Early life ==
Burkhead played high school football at South Dade Senior High School in Homestead, Florida. He earned honorable mention All-Miami-Dade County honors his senior year in 1983. He played college football for the Richmond Spiders of the University of Richmond. He was redshirted in 1984. He was a letterman as a redshirt freshman in 1985. In 1986, he transferred to play for the Florida State Seminoles of Florida State University. However, he returned to the University of Richmond during the summer of 1986. Burkhead was the backup to Bob Bleier during the 1986 season. After the 1986 season, he transferred to Florida State again but had to sit out the 1987 season due to NCAA transfer rules. He then quit football.

== Professional career ==
Burkhead signed with the Miami Hooters of the Arena Football League (AFL) on May 2, 1994, after being discovered at an open tryout camp. Prior to signing with the Hooters, he had been playing flag football and working as an appraisor for Appraisal and Real Estate Economics Associates. Burkhead was released by Miami before the start of the 1994 AFL season. After Hooters starting quarterback Jim Jensen suffered an injury during the second week of the season, Burkhead was signed to backup Clemente Gordon. On June 10, 1994, Burkhead replaced Gordon late in the third quarter of a game against the Orlando Predators, completing seven of nine passes for 51 yards while leading the team to two fourth quarter touchdowns as Miami lost 53–21. With Gordon hampered by an injury, Burkhead was named the starter for the following week's game against the Milwaukee Mustangs on June 20. Against the Mustangs, Burkhead completed 19 of 27 passes for 209 yards and two touchdowns while also rushing for two touchdowns as the Hooters won by a score of 35–27. Due to his strong play, Burkhead was named the starter over Gordon for the team's next game against the Tampa Bay Storm. Burkhead completed 12 of 28 passes for 164 yards in the 47–32 loss to the Storm on June 25. He started his third straight game on July 9 against the Arizona Rattlers, throwing for 197 yards and three touchdowns in a 41–26 loss. Jensen then returned from injury and resumed his starting role for the Hooters. Overall, Burkhead played in eight games during the 1994 season, completing 58 of 100 passes (58.0%) for 617 yards, nine touchdowns, and six interceptions while also rushing for two touchdowns.

In January 1995, it was reported that Burkhead had signed with the Miami Centurion of the United Football Association. He was in camp with the Hooters again in 1995 but did not end up making the team.
