= William Birkett =

English cricketer

William Birkett (27 February 1874 – 2 May 1934), also known as William Burkitt, was an English first-class cricketer who represented Derbyshire in 1898 and 1901.

Birkett was born at Unstone, near Dronfield, Derbyshire, the son of John Burkitt a farmer, and his wife Ann. He made his Derbyshire debut in a single match in 1898. He appeared in three matches in the 1901 season. Birkett's top score was an innings of 10 in August 1901 in a draw against Lancashire. Birkett scored three consecutive ducks in his final three innings for Derbyshire, and did not appear again for the side.

Birkett was an occasional bowler and took three first-class wickets at an average of 38.33. He was a lower-order batsman, and played seven innings in four first-class matches for a total of 20 runs.

Birkett was a farmer and died aged 60 at Grange Farm, Norton, Sheffield.
