= Birkenhead, South Africa =

Birkenhead
- Location within Western Cape Location within South Africa
- Coordinates: 34°37′0″S 19°19′39″E
- Country: South Africa
- Province: Western Cape
- District: Overberg
- Municipality: Overstrand

Area
  - Total: 9.83 km^{2} (3.80 sq mi)

Population (2011)
  - Total: 56
  - Density: 5.7/km^{2} (15/sq mi)

Racial makeup (2011)
  - Black African: 19.6%
  - Coloured: 14.3%
  - White: 66.1%

First languages (2011)
  - Afrikaans: 78.6%
  - English: 16.1%
  - S. Ndebele: 1.8%
  - Northern Sotho: 1.8%
  - Other: 1.8%
- Time zone: UTC+2 (SAST)

Birkenhead is a settlement in Overberg District Municipality in the Western Cape province of South Africa. It is located on the Danger Point Peninsula (Birkenhead Peninsula) on the southern side of Walker Bay. It is in Ward 14 of Overstrand Local Municipality.
