= Drummoyne =

- Suburb
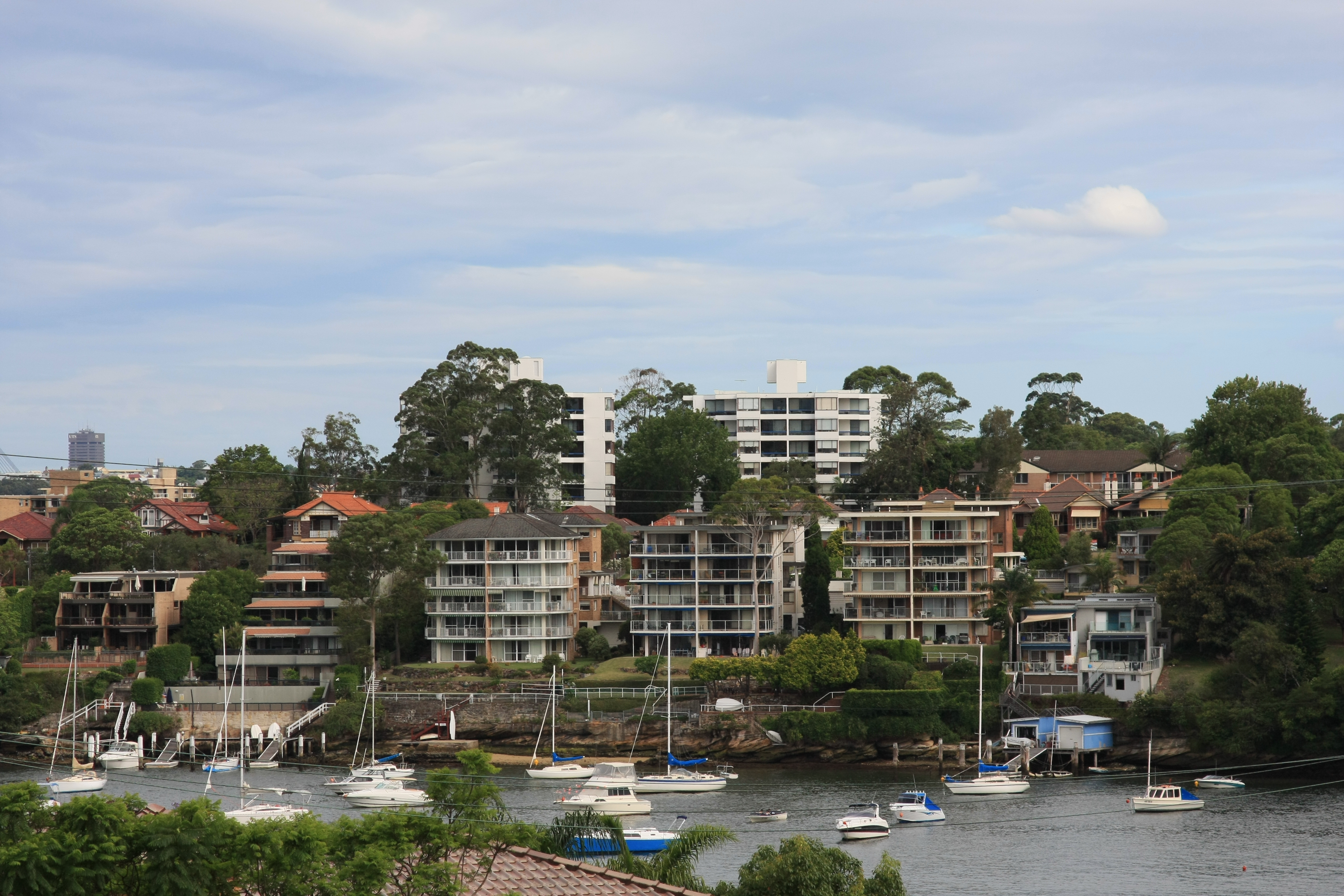
- Apartments on the Parramatta River, Drummoyne

- Interactive map of Drummoyne
- Coordinates: 33°51′13″S 151°09′14″E
- Country: Australia
- State: New South Wales
- City: Sydney
- LGA: City of Canada Bay
- Location: 6 km (3.7 mi) W of Sydney CBD
- Established: 1890

Government
  - State electorate: Drummoyne
  - Federal division: Reid

Area
  - Total: 2.31 km^{2} (0.89 sq mi)
- Elevation: 33 m (108 ft)

Population
  - Total: 12,011 (2021 census)
  - Density: 5,200/km^{2} (13,467/sq mi)
- Postcode: 2047
Suburbs around Drummoyne
Huntleys Point	Hunters Hill	Cockatoo Island
Abbotsford	Drummoyne	Balmain
Five Dock	Russell Lea	Rozelle

Drummoyne is a suburb in the Inner West of Sydney, in the state of New South Wales, Australia. Drummoyne is six kilometres west of the Sydney central business district and is the administrative centre for the local government area of the City of Canada Bay.

Drummoyne sits on the peninsula between Iron Cove and Five Dock Bay. It is surrounded on three sides by the Parramatta River and, as such, has some of Sydney's best waterfront views. Drummoyne neighbours the similarly historic Five Dock and Abbotsford.

== History ==
William Wright, a merchant, whaler and sealer, bought land in the northern part of the area in 1853. The property was bounded by present-day Lyons Road and Victoria Road.

Drummoyne House was built in the Georgian Classical style. It was rectangular in plan with a hipped roof with a concave verandah across the entire front and returned along each side. He named it Drummoyne Park after his family home at Drumoyne on Clyde in Scotland. In Gaelic, Drummoyne means flat topped ridge.

== Heritage listings ==
Drummoyne has a number of heritage-listed sites, including:

- Rawson Avenue: Drummoyne Reservoir
- Victoria Road: Gladesville Bridge

== Demographics ==
In the 2021 census of population and Housing, the population of Drummoyne stood at 12,011 people, 52.8% were female and 47.2% were male, with a median age of 42 years. 66.9% of people were born in Australia. The most common countries of birth were England 4.0%, Italy 2.1%, New Zealand 2.1%, China 1.7%, and Greece 1.0%. 73.8% of people only spoke English at home. Other languages spoken at home included Italian 3.2%, Greek 3.0%, Mandarin 1.8%, Cantonese 1.5%, and Arabic 1.4%. The most common responses for religion in Drummoyne were No Religion 34.5%, Catholic 31.7% and Anglican 9.1%.

Drummoyne's population is wealthier than the Australian average, with a median weekly household income of $2,776, compared with $1,746 in Australia. 67.5% of the suburbs occupied private dwellings were family households, 28.7% were lone person households and 3.8% were group households.

== Notable residents ==
- Herbert Dennis, architect
- Reg Latta, rugby league player
- Michael Pate, actor
- Donald Shand, grazier and airline founder
- Peter Clarke (rugby league), rugby league player

== Politics ==
Drummoyne is now part of the City of Canada Bay, a municipality formed in 2000 by the amalgamation of the municipalities of Drummoyne and Concord. It is part of the NSW Legislative Assembly electoral district of Drummoyne whose current member is Stephanie Di Pasqua MP. It is in the Federal electorate of Reid and is represented in Federal parliament by Sally Sitou.

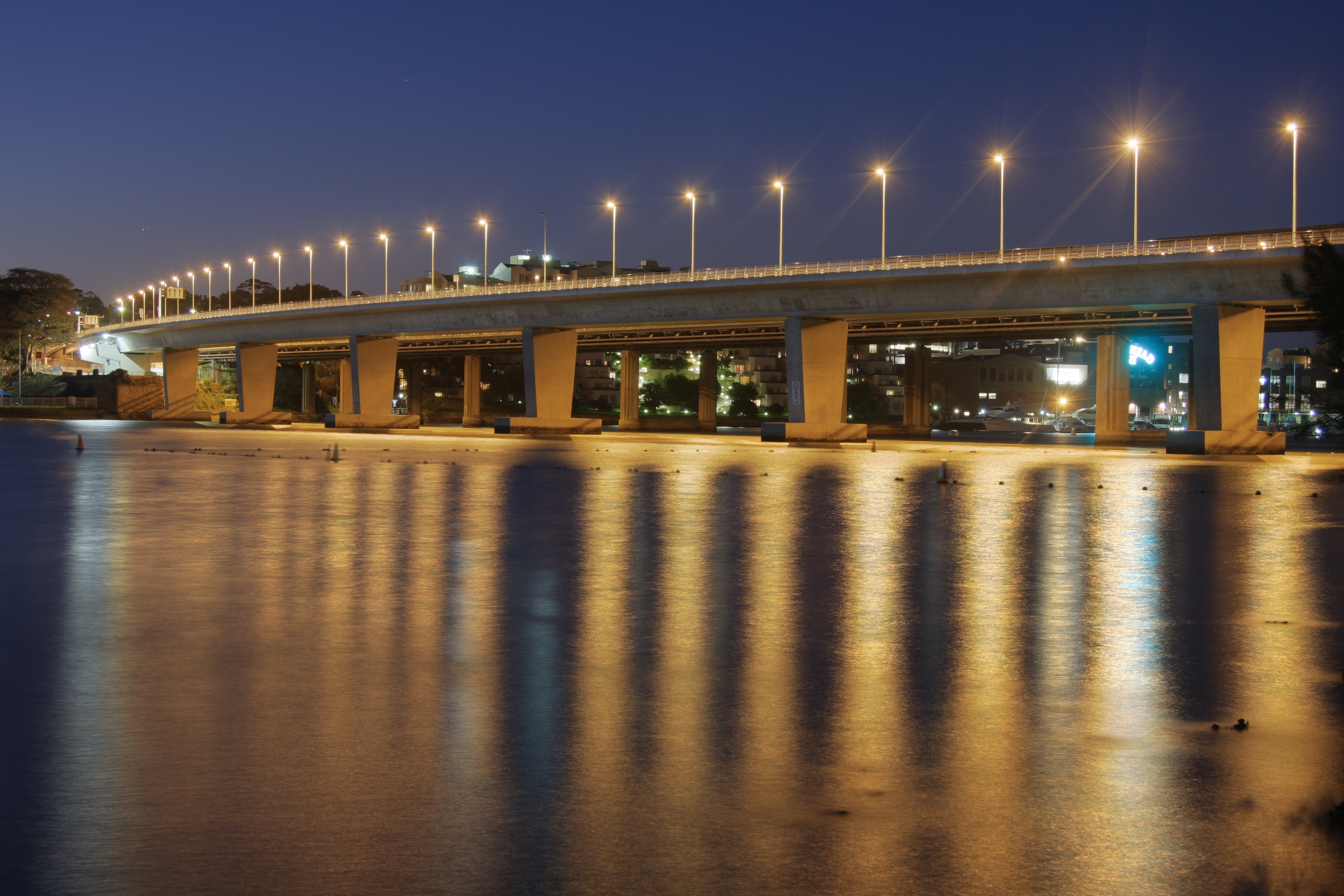
Iron Cove Bridge duplication looking towards Drummoyne

== Transport ==
Drummoyne is linked to Rozelle by the Victoria Road and Huntleys Point by the Gladesville Bridge. Victoria Road, one of Sydney's busiest roads, cuts through the heart of Drummoyne en route to the Sydney central business district. Numerous and frequent Busways and Transit Systems bus routes from Sydney's west merge in Drummoyne. However, it also leads to a bottleneck during the morning and evening peaks.

Regular Sydney Ferries Parramatta River ferry services from Drummoyne ferry wharf also provide a transport option for Drummoyne residents, servicing the Parramatta-City route.

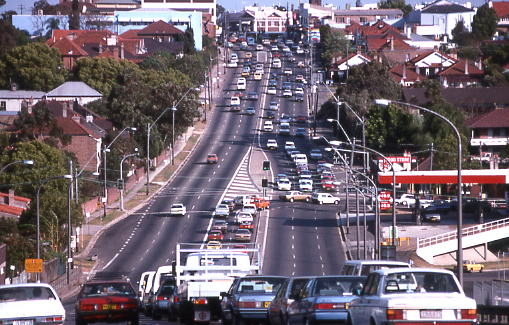
Afternoon traffic on Victoria Road

== Commercial area ==
Drummoyne is mostly residential with some commercial developments, and still retains some of its industrial heritage. The main shopping strip is located along Victoria Road and the intersecting Lyons Road featuring Australia's largest party store, The Party People as well as restaurants, home improvement stores and specialty shops. There is also a small shopping plaza at this point. The Birkenhead Point Outlet Centre, featuring a Coles supermarket, specialty shops and factory outlet stores is located at Birkenhead Point. The Canada Bay Civic Centre, the administration building for the City of Canada Bay, is located in Marlborough Street.

== Sport ==
Drummoyne Rowing Club, formed in 1919, is one of four rowing clubs on Iron Cove in Sydney Harbour. It has occupied its current site at Sister's Bay, Drummoyne since its foundation.

Drummoyne is home to Drummoyne Oval, situated on the banks of the Parramatta River. In 1931, as a depression project, Drummoyne Oval was constructed on the site of a small oval which the Glebe and Balmain Rugby Union Clubs had used for junior matches since 1892. To ensure longevity of tenure, because there were not enough sporting grounds in Sydney, the Glebe Balmain Club decided to change its name to the Drummoyne District Rugby Football Club. It did so without giving up its long-held traditions, the scarlet jumpers of Glebe and its tag, "The Dirty Reds" and the black and gold of Balmain, colours still worn by today's players on their socks. The Drummoyne Rugby Club still plays at Drummoyne Oval as it has done for many years and is its permanent home.

Drummoyne Oval is also a permanent home to Sydney first grade cricket side Balmain-UTS during the summer and occasionally hosts the NSW Blues Cricket side in the Australian domestic limited-overs cricket tournament. In the 2024 edition of WBBL it was the home ground for Sydney Thunder. With a carpet-like playing surface and large capacity (approximately 8,000), the oval is often used for cricket, Australian rules football and Rugby Union.

Drummoyne Olympic pool is located on the banks of Iron Cove. Filtered chlorine is separated from open water by 3 metres of poolside deck, and the facility is where the Drummoyne Devils play.

The Bay Run is a popular route for runners and walkers.

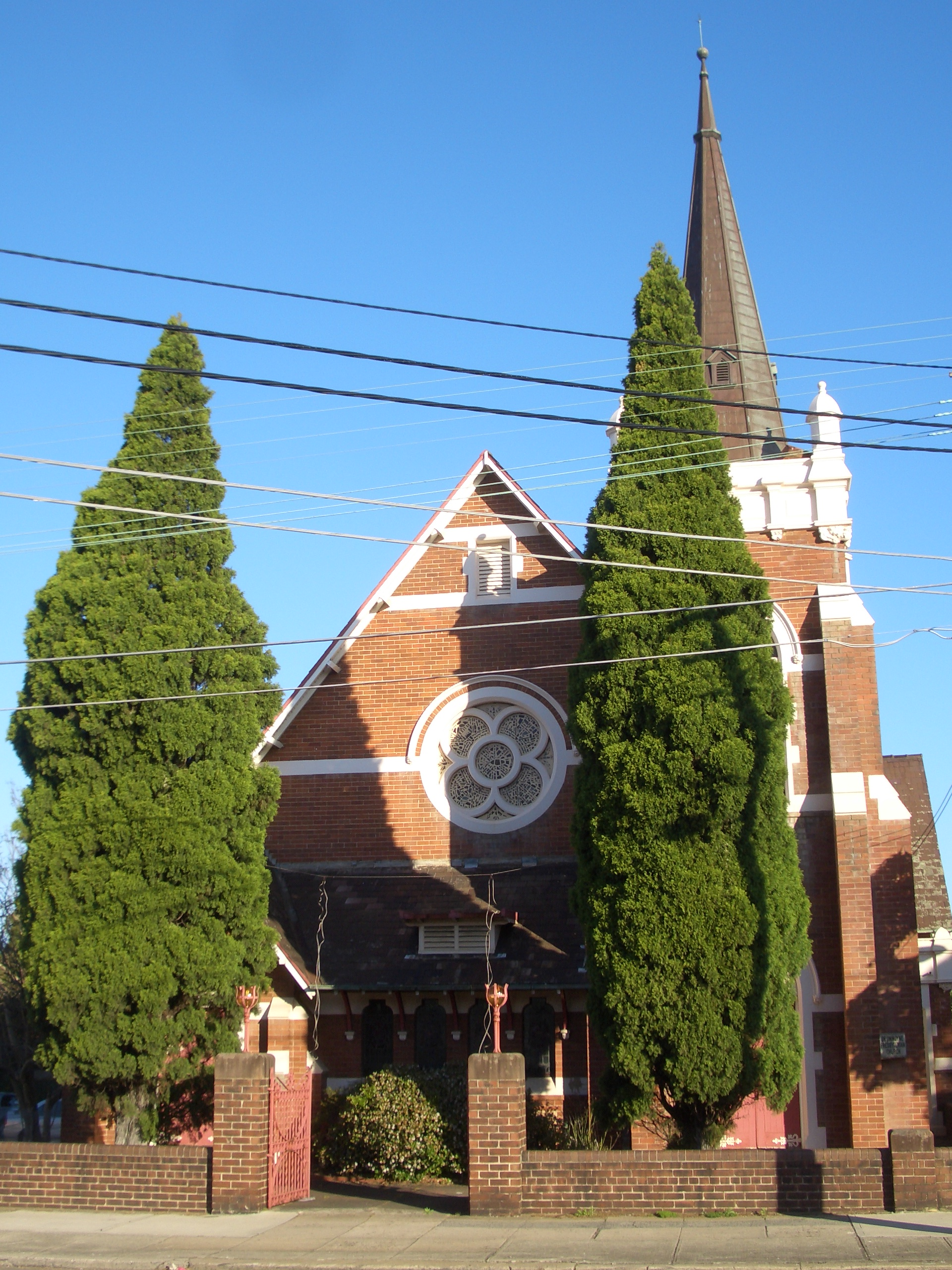
Drummoyne Presbyterian

== Churches ==
- St Bede's Anglican Church
  Designed in 1931 by Emil Sodersten
- St Mark's Catholic Church
  Where the series Correlli was filmed
- Drummoyne Presbyterian Church
- Drummoyne Baptist Church

== Schools and colleges ==
- Drummoyne Boys' High School closed in 1990
- Drummoyne Public School
- St Mark's Primary School

== Gallery ==
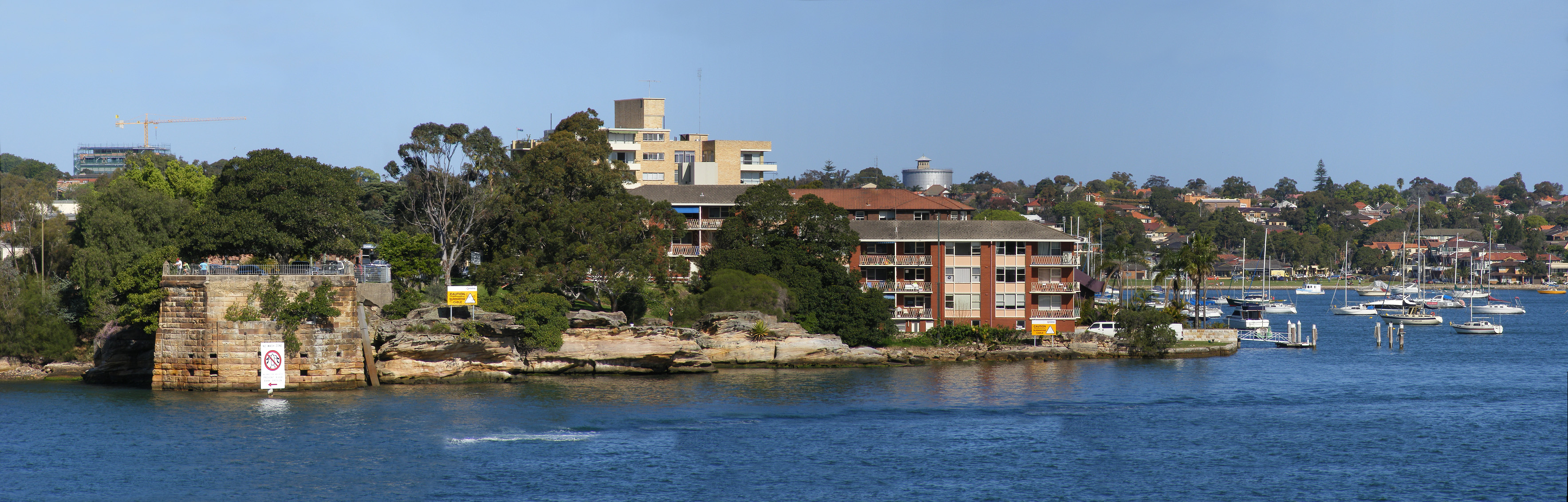
View of Five Dock, looking south across Parramatta River

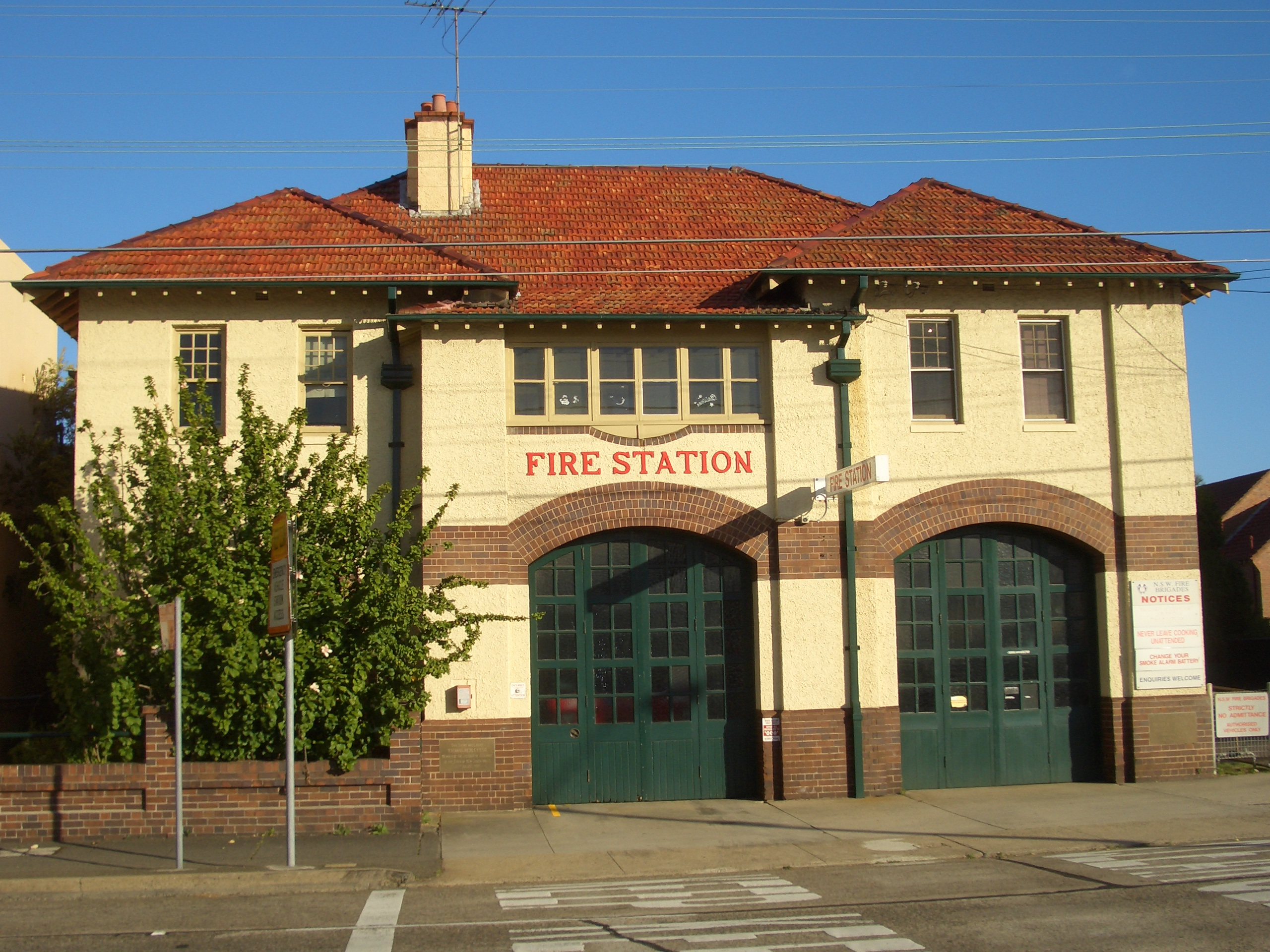
Fire Station, Lyons Road

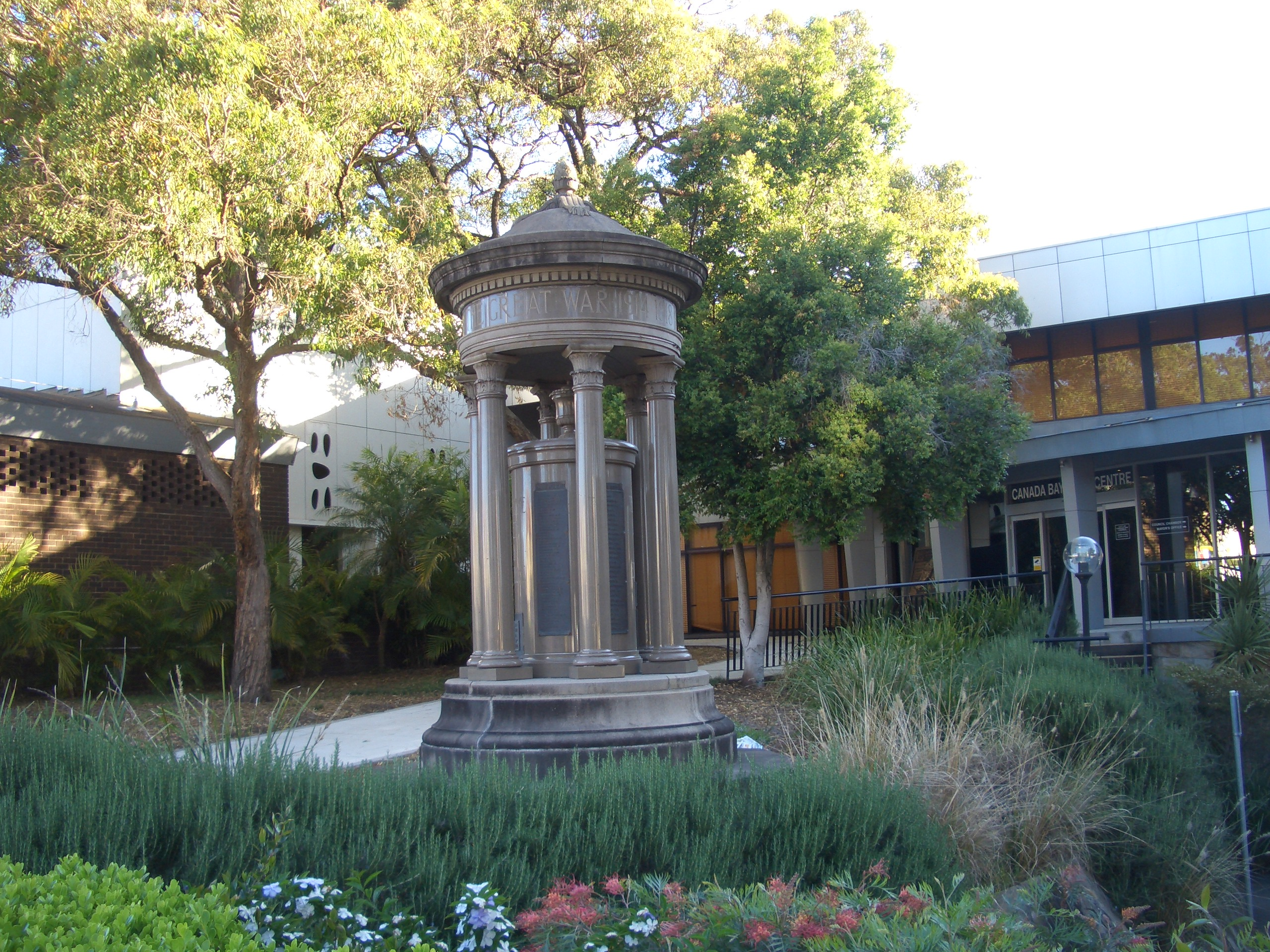
War Memorial, Marlborough Street

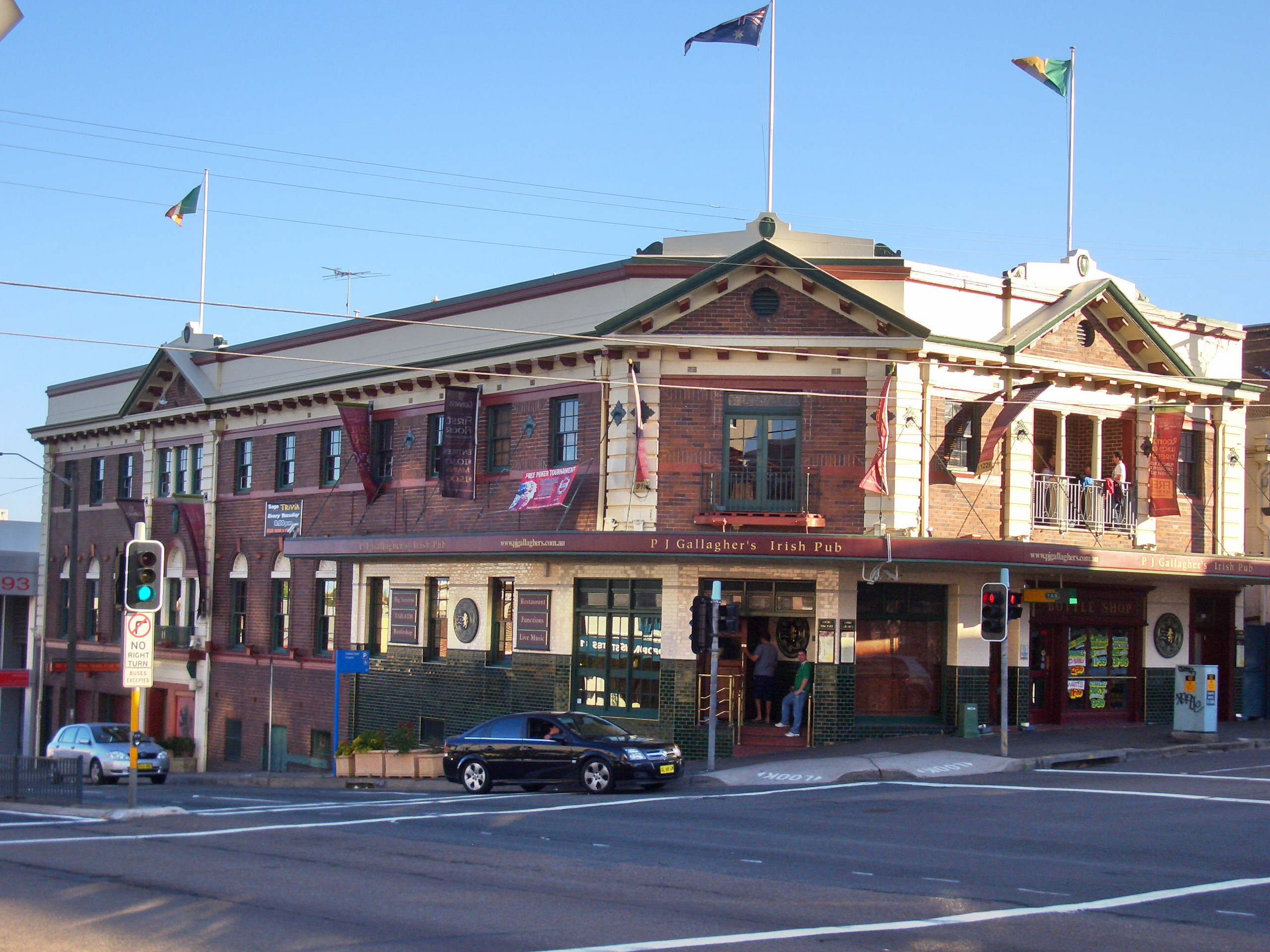
The Oxford Hotel

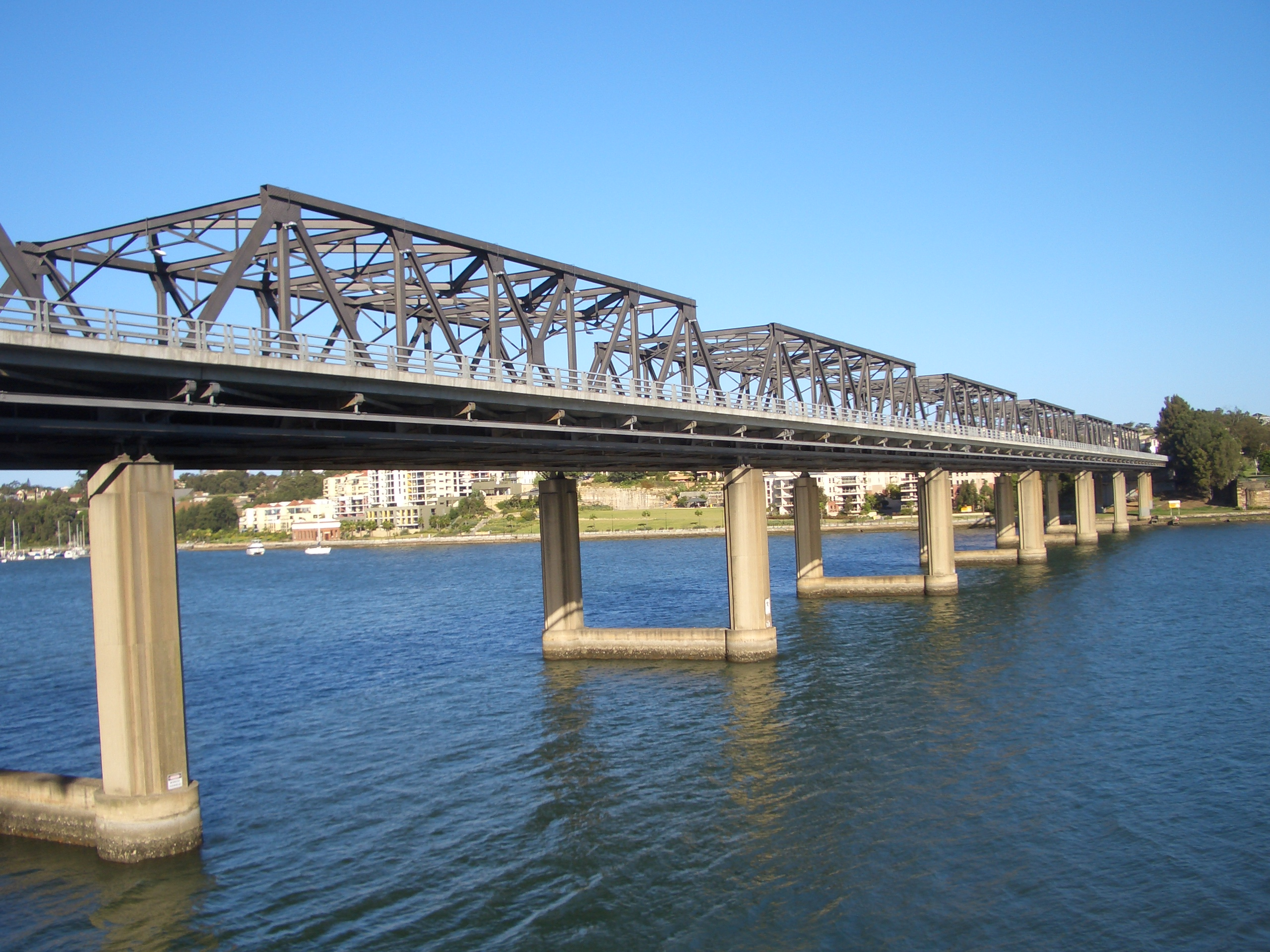
Iron Cove Bridge

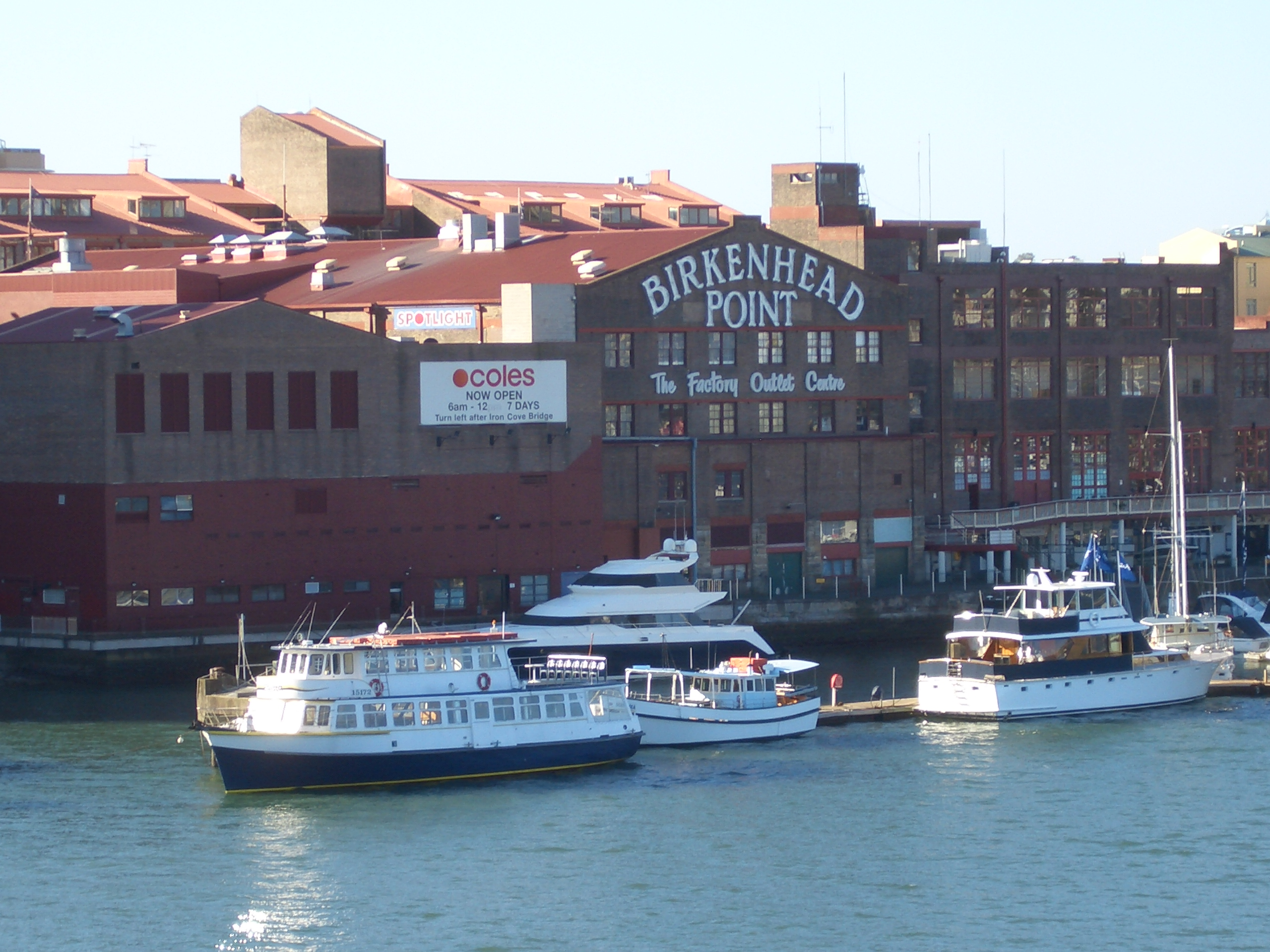
Birkenhead Point Outlet Centre

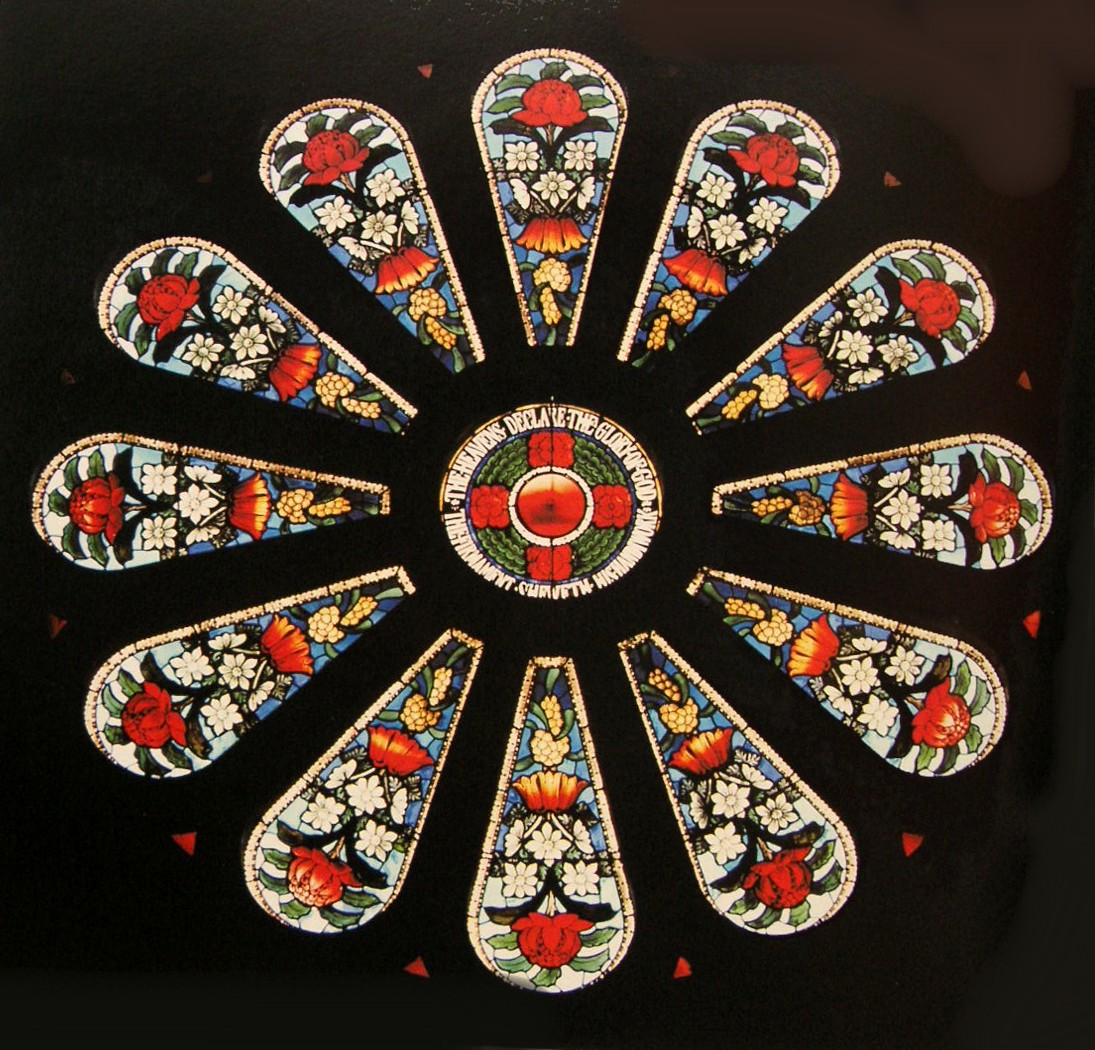
The waratah window of St Bede's Anglican Church, by Alfred Handel.
