= Birkenhead Point Outlet Centre =

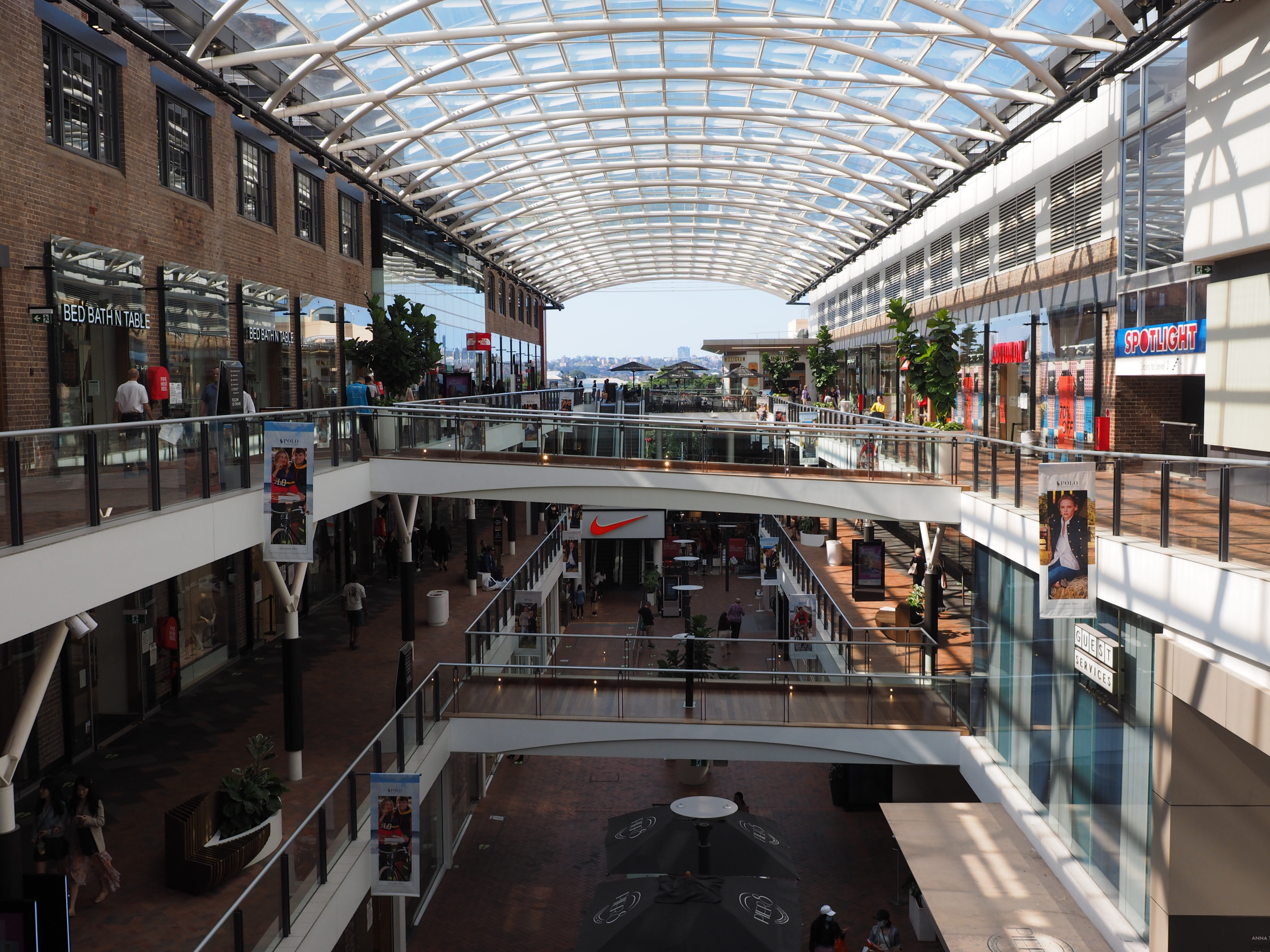
- Interior in September 2020
- Location: Drummoyne, Sydney, Australia
- Coordinates: 33°51′21″S 151°9′41″E
- Opened: 26 June 1979
- Developer: David Jones
- Manager: Mirvac
- Owner: Mirvac
- Num. of stores: 120
- Floor area: 33,106 m^{2} (356,350 sq ft)
- Floors: 3
- Parking: 1,395
- Website: birkenheadpoint.com.au

The Birkenhead Point Outlet Centre is an outlet centre located in Drummoyne, Sydney, Australia on the bank of Iron Cove. As well as including a large number of shops, the centre also includes a marina and apartment complex.

== History ==
Prior to being redeveloped as a shopping centre, the site was the site of the Perdriau Rubber Factory. Henry Perdriau started manufacturing rubber products here in about 1900. Perdriau Rubber Company merged with the Dunlop Rubber Company in 1928, by which time Perdriau was producing 50,000 shoes per week and between 500,000 and 780,000 tyres annually.

The factoryclosed in 1976 with the site was sold to David Jones to be redeveloped. The centre opened on 26 July 1979. In October 2014 it was purchaed by Mirvac.

== Transport links ==
A bus stop on Victoria Road is served by Busways services that from the Sydney central business district to West Ryde and Parramatta. From November 1994 until October 2010, the adjacenct Birkenhead ferry wharf was served by Sydney Ferries services operating from Circular Quay.
