= A4/M4 (Sydney) =

Road route in New South Wales, Australia

A4/M4/A44 New South Wales

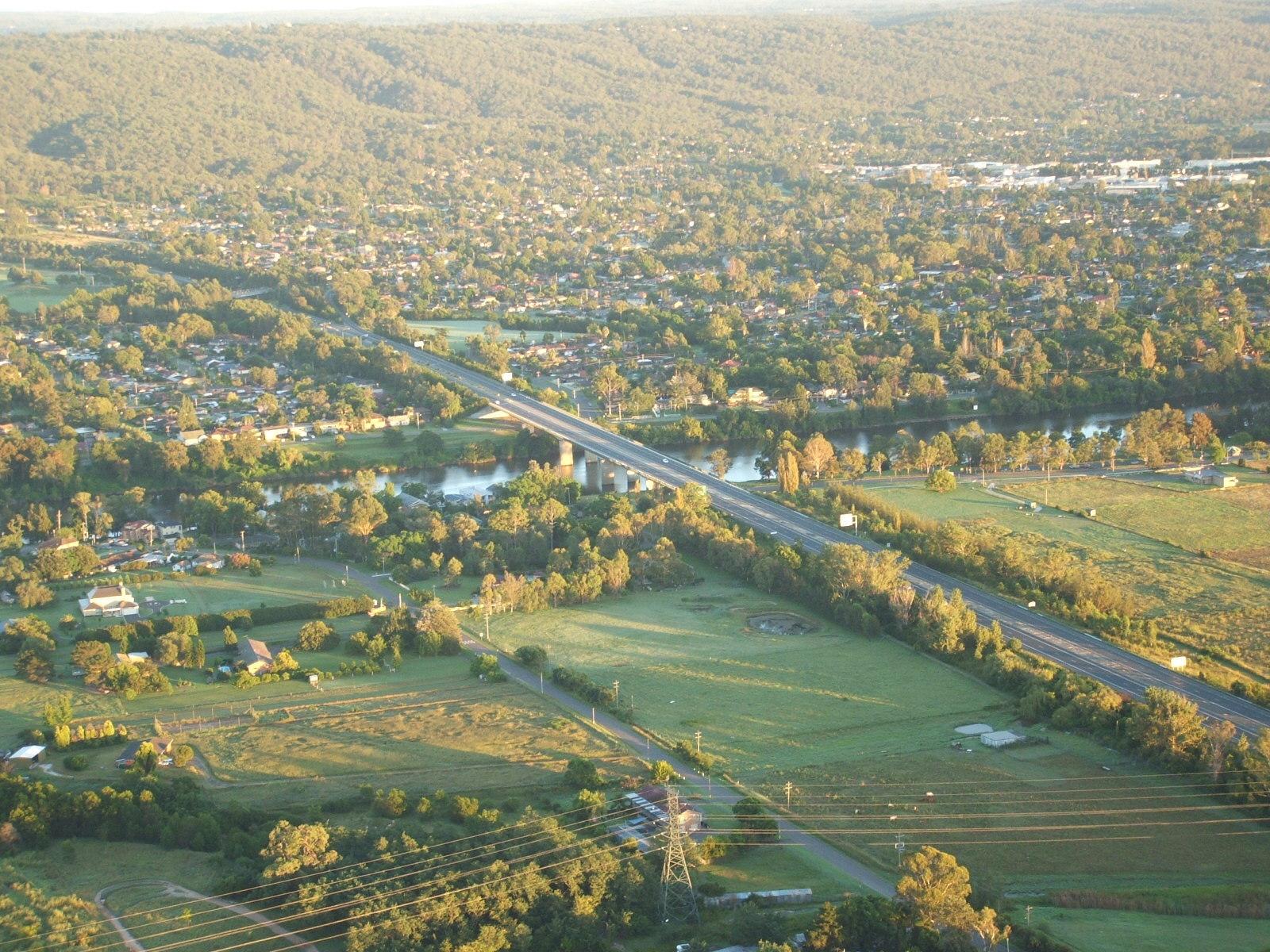
- M4 Motorway crossing the Nepean River, shortly east of the Russel Street intersection

General information
- Type: Motorway
- Route number(s): A4 (2013–present) (Sydney CBD–Rozelle); M4 (2013/2023–present) (Rozelle–Glenbrook); A44 (2013/2023–present) (Rozelle–Emu Plains)
- Former route number: Metroad 4 (1992/1993–2013) (Sydney CBD–Glenbrook); National Route 32 (1955–1992) (Sydney CBD–Emu Plains); State Route 44 (1974–2013) (Strathfield–Emu Plains)

Major junctions
- East end: Bradfield Highway; Sydney CBD
- Cross City Tunnel; City West Link; Western Harbour Tunnel; M8 Motorway; Parramatta Road; Homebush Bay Drive; Silverwater Road; Cumberland Highway; James Ruse Drive; Prospect Highway; WestLink; The Northern Road; Russell Street; Great Western Highway
- West end: Great Western Highway; Glenbrook, Sydney

Highway system
- Highways in Australia; National Highway • Freeways in Australia; Highways in New South Wales

The A4, A44 and M4 are a collection of arterial routes in Sydney, New South Wales that connect the Inner West of Sydney with the outer western suburbs.

The A4 and M4 mostly follows what was previously National Route 32 from the Western Distributor in the CBD, west to the Great Western Highway at Lapstone. Both the A4 and M4 sections were known as Metroad 4 until 2013, which in turn replaced the previous Sydney stretch of National Route 32 in September 1992 while the A44 was known as State Route 44 until 2013.

Between 2019 and 2023, the progressive opening of WestConnex resulted in route allocation of M4 along newly opened sections, and former bypassed sections of A4 redesignated as A44. The last route redesignation was in November 2023 with the opening of Rozelle Interchange, the last component of the WestConnex.

The names "M4", "A44" and "A4" are just the route allocations for the route as a whole. In fact, the M4 route runs along a whole series of motorways with the A44 running parallel along non-motorway roads until they converge west of Anzac Bridge. East of here is the Western Distributor, the only section of the A4 route, even though the Western Distributor is also a controlled-access highway (i.e. like a motorway but with lower speed limits).

The roads from east to west are:

- A4 section:
  - Western Distributor
- A44 section:
  - Victoria Road
  - The Crescent
  - City West Link
  - Dobroyd Parade
  - Wattle Street
  - Great Western Highway/Parramatta Road (West of Wattle Street Intersection)
- M4 section:
  - M4 East
  - Western Motorway

== History ==
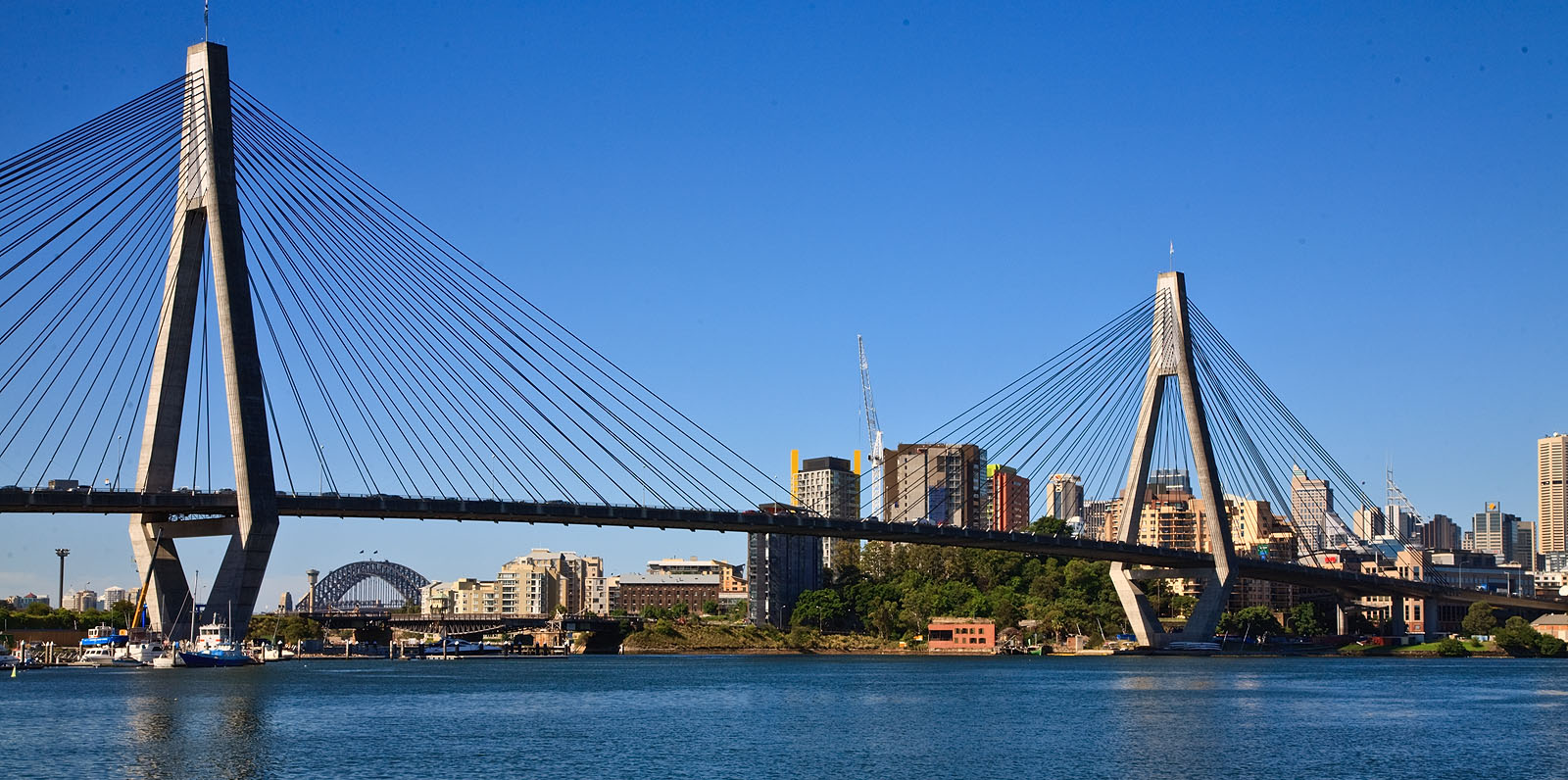
Anzac Bridge carries the A4 into the Sydney city centre.

The earliest route allocation of M4/A4 is National Route 32. It was introduced in 1954 with other National Routes. Most of the 1954 alignment of National Route 32 in Sydney is very different from the current M4/A4 alignment in Sydney. Back then National Route 32 ran along the entire Great Western Highway from Bathurst via the Blue Mountains to Broadway, Sydney.

With the opening of the M4 Motorway in 1992, National Route 32 was truncated and terminated at Lapstone in Blue Mountains instead. Metroad 4 was introduced to replace the Sydney section of National Route 32, but went along the motorway instead of Great Western Highway from Lapstone to North Strathfield. This was the first Metroad to be introduced in Sydney. The section of Great Western Highway that was formerly National Route 32 was allocated State Route 44 which is now A44.

In 2000, when the City West Link opened, Metroad 4 was realigned to Wattle Street, Dobroyd Parade, City West Link, Victoria Road and Western Distributor and terminated at the junction of Cahill Expressway, Western Distributor and Bradfield Highway in Millers Point.

In 2013, as part of the state-wide alpha numeric route conversion, the Metroad 4 was replaced by M4 for the motorway and A4 for the non-motorway section.

In July 2019, the A4 between Strathfield and Haberfield was realigned onto the new M4 East tunnels and was redesignated M4. This meant that A4 no longer runs along any section of Parramatta Road or Great Western Highway.

In January 2023, the M4 route was extended along the newly open M4–M8 tunnels, but temporarily transitioned into the M8 route at Leichhardt. The previous A4 on City West Link was also redesignated A44. This resulted in a discontinuity between the M4 and A4 routes for ten months, until the opening of the Rozelle Interchange in November 2023 which extended the M4 route along newly opened tunnels to meet with the A4 just west of Anzac Bridge.
