= Bradfield Highway =

Bradfield Highway may refer to the following highways in Australia:

- Bradfield Highway (Sydney), that crosses the Sydney Harbour Bridge
- Bradfield Highway in Brisbane, Queensland, that crosses the Story Bridge
