= City West Link =

Road in Sydney, Australia

City West Link (numerous constituent roads) New South Wales
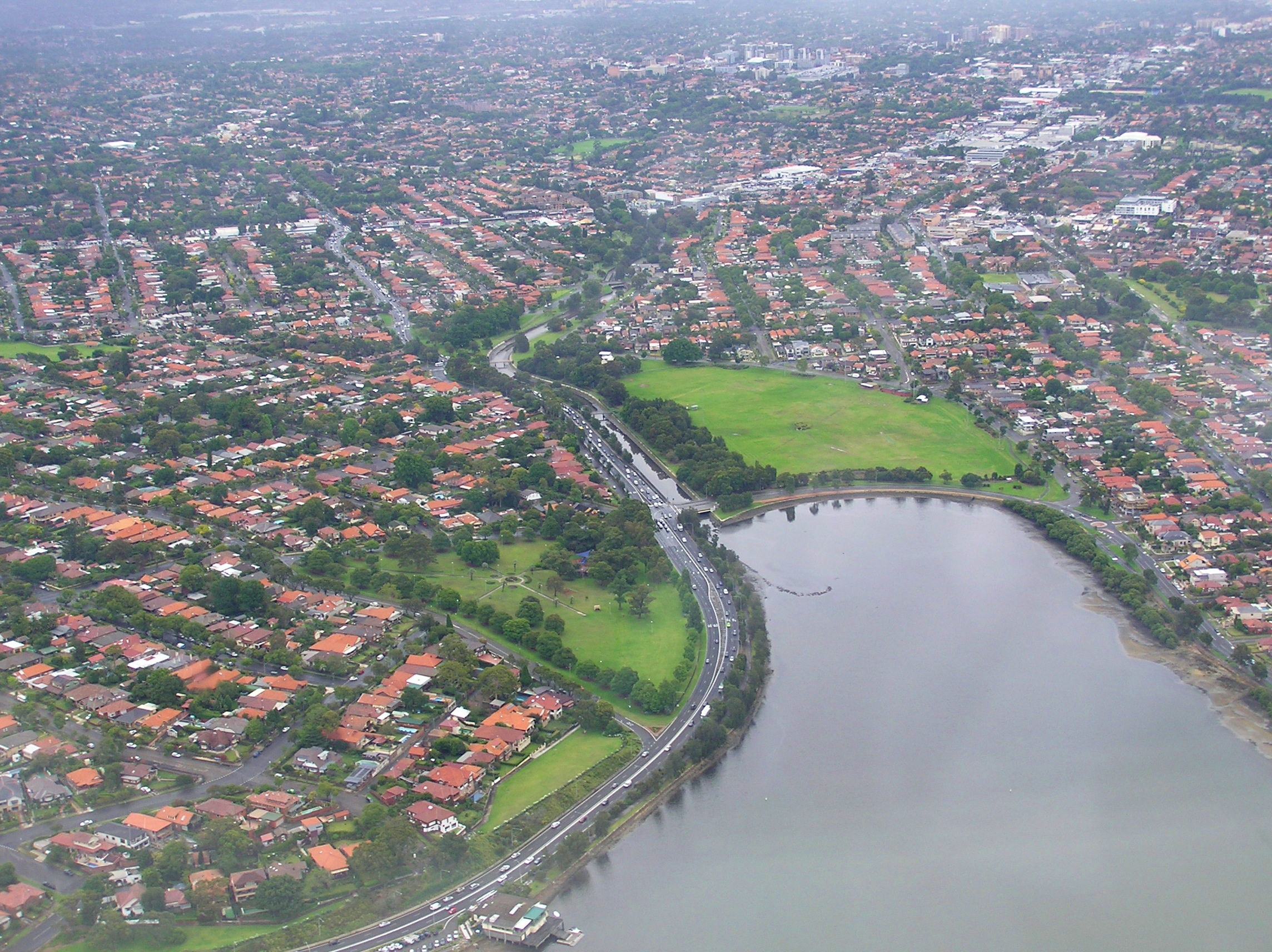
- The City West Link passes through Haberfield, beside Iron Cove.
- Coordinates: 33°52′37″S 151°07′47″E (West end); 33°52′09″S 151°10′35″E (East end)

General information
- Type: Highway
- Length: 5.0 km (3.1 mi)
- Gazetted: January 1993
- Route number(s): A44 (2023–present)
- Former route number: A4 (2013–2023); Metroad 4 (2000–2013)

Major junctions
- West end: Frederick Street; Haberfield, Sydney
- Parramatta Road; East Motorway; M8 Motorway; Western Harbour Tunnel; Victoria Road
- East end: Western Distributor; Rozelle, Sydney

Location(s)
- Major suburbs: Leichardt, Lilyfield

Highway system
- Highways in Australia; National Highway • Freeways in Australia; Highways in New South Wales

City West Link is a 5.0-kilometre (3.1 mi) link road connecting Parramatta Road and the Western Distributor through the Inner West suburbs of Sydney, New South Wales, Australia. It was bypassed by the WestConnex project upon its completion in November 2023. This name covers a few consecutive roads and is widely known to most drivers, but the entire allocation is also known – and signposted – by the names of its constituent parts: Wattle Street, Dobroyd Parade, City West Link proper and The Crescent.

== Route ==
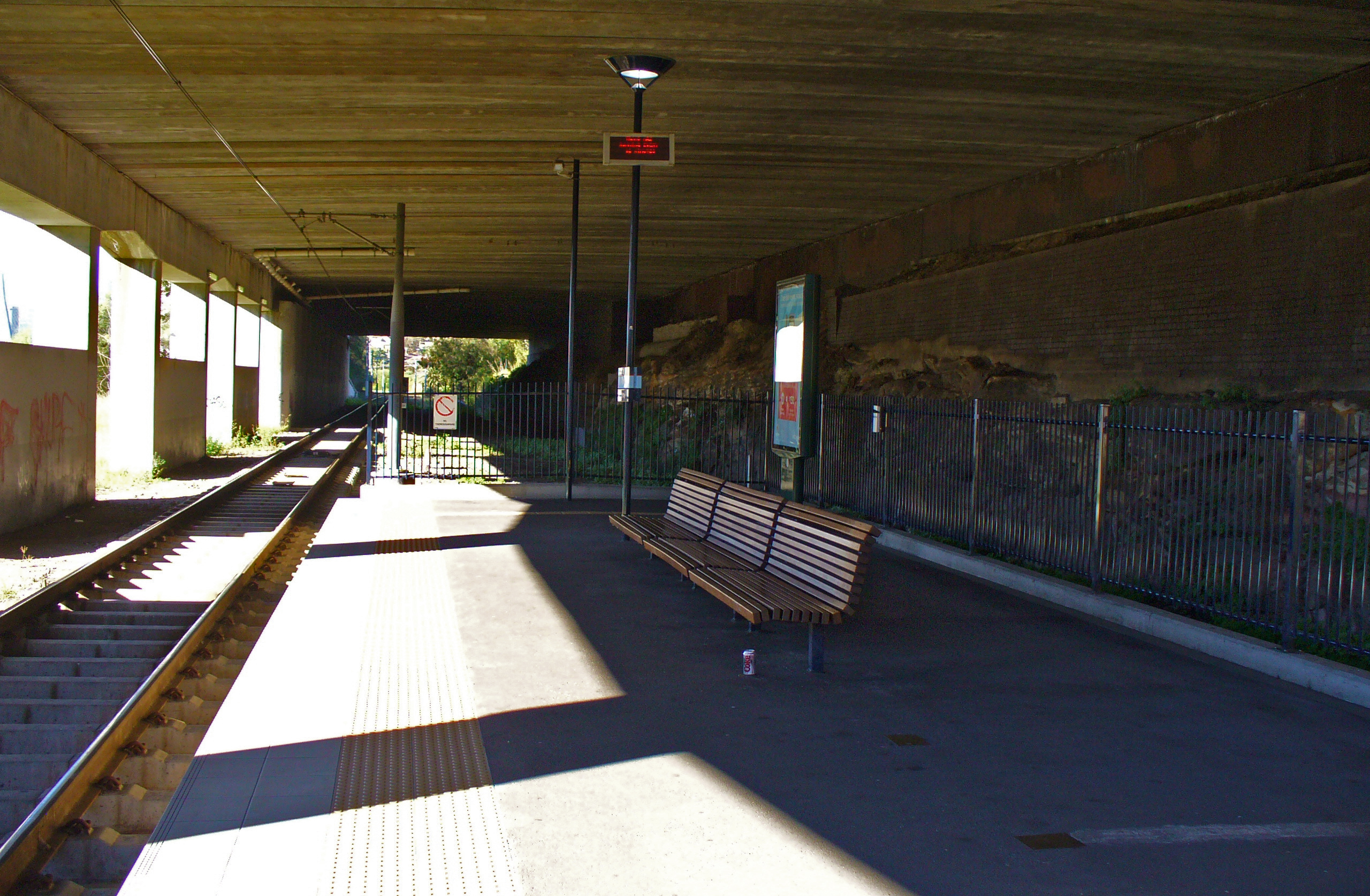
The route passes over the Inner West Light Rail at Lilyfield station.

City West Link starts at the intersection of Parramatta Road and Frederick Street in Haberfield as Wattle Street and heads in an easterly direction as a six-lane, dual-carriageway road, where after a short distance it meets the intersection with Ramsay Road (on the surface), and the ramps for the M4 Motorway (underground, westbound for M4 East and eastbound for M4-M8 Link). At the intersection with Waratah Street it changes name to Dobroyd Parade and narrows to a four-lane, single carriageway, following Iron Cove Creek and the southern bank of Iron Cove until it crosses Hawthorne Canal, where it changes name to City West Link and continues east, following the Inner West Light Rail track through Lilyfield. It intersects with and changes name to The Crescent, before terminating a short distance at the interchange with Victoria Road in Rozelle, where it continues east as Western Distributor.

== History ==
=== Construction ===
The City West Link project, much to the disappointment of some local residents, simply involved the upgrade of existing roads and streets to at least four lanes. The process was carried out in four stages:

- Stage One: (December 1991) An underpass beneath Victoria Road opened.
- Stage Two: (February 1993) Upgrades from The Crescent at Rozelle to Catherine Street at Lilyfield, using Brenan Street. This section used a temporary one-way system to deliver traffic to Lilyfield Road.
- Stage Three: (May 1995) Dobroyd Parade and Wattle Street reconstruction was completed, providing four lanes between Parramatta Road and Hawthorne Canal, parallel to Iron Cove and Iron Cove Creek.
- Stage Four: (December 2000) Road extended from Catherine Street to Dobroyd Parade. A new bridge was constructed over Hawthorne Canal. City West Link became part of Metroad 4 (later A4), relieving a congested section of Parramatta Road.

The passing of the Main Roads Act of 1924 through the Parliament of New South Wales provided for the declaration of Main Roads, roads partially funded by the State government through the Main Roads Board (MRB). With the subsequent passing of the Main Roads (Amendment) Act of 1929 to provide for additional declarations of State Highways and Trunk Roads, the Department of Main Roads (having succeeded the MRB in 1932) declared Main Road 650 along the route, from the interchange with Victoria Road in Rozelle along The Crescent, City Link West Road, Brenan Street, Balmain Road, Lilyfield Road, Dobroyd Parade and Wattle Street to Parramatta Road at Haberfield (and continuing east along Frederick Street to meet with Hume Highway in Croydon), on 22 January 1993.

The passing of the Roads Act of 1993 updated road classifications and the way they could be declared within New South Wales. Under this act, City West Link retains its declaration as part of Main Road 650.

Once the final upgrade was completed in 2000, the route was allocated Metroad 4, between Haberfield and Rozelle. With the conversion to the newer alphanumeric system in 2013, Metroad 4 was replaced by route A4. When the M4 East was opened in 2019, route A44 was extended from Parramatta Road and allocated along City West Link through Haberfield to the Ramsay Road interchange (where the ramps to the M4 East emerge), and extended a final time along its entire length to the interchange with Western Distributor when the Rozelle Interchange opened in 2023.

=== Post-opening ===
Motorists began complaining early in 2004 that the road had already become congested, less than four years after opening. The road ultimately feeds into Parramatta Road, thus congestion points on Parramatta Road have simply been moved to different areas rather than relieved altogether.

In 2005, a major bottleneck at the eastern end was removed. Previously eastbound traffic on the link had to merge from two lanes into one, just before joining Victoria Road west of the Anzac Bridge. There are now two lanes from the west link merging with the three from Victoria Road, to make four lanes over the Anzac Bridge.

==== Connection to M4 ====
After the opening of City West Link, the Roads & Traffic Authority had plans to connect it to the M4 motorway, completely bypassing Parramatta Road. Included in the project was the removal of the at-grade intersections on City West Link for through traffic. The plan was complicated, and involved building bridges for City West Link Road to pass over at-grade intersections, some of which made provision for only one traffic lane in each direction. Residents and advocacy groups voiced fears that this would worsen current congestion problems. The whole project was cancelled in late 2004

In the 2010s, the project was revived as the WestConnex project that involved a tunnel being built instead. The first part of the tunnel, known as M4 East, opened to the western end of the City West Link in July 2019. An extension of this tunnel opened on 20 January 2023, but it was unable to replace City West Link until ramps at the Rozelle Interchange opened on 26 November 2023.

== Major intersections ==
City West Link is entirely contained within the Inner West Council local government area.

Location	km	mi	Destinations	Notes
Haberfield–Ashfield boundary	0.0	0.0	Frederick Street – Ashfield	Western terminus of road, western end of Wattle Street
Haberfield–Ashfield boundary	0.0	0.0	Parramatta Road (A44 west, unallocated east) – Camperdown, Homebush, Parramatta	Route A44 continues west along Parramatta Road
Haberfield	0.5	0.31	Ramsay Road – Five Dock, Haberfield	
Haberfield	0.5	0.31	M4 East Motorway (M4 west) – Strathfield, Homebush, Penrith	Westbound entrance and eastbound exit only
Haberfield	0.5	0.31	M4 East Motorway (M4 east), to: – Western Distributor (A4) – Pyrmont, Sydney CBD – M8 Motorway (M8) – St Peters, Kingsgrove, Sydney Airport	Eastbound entrance and westbound exit only
Haberfield	0.8	0.50	Waratah Street – Haberfield	Eastern end of Wattle Street, western end of Dobroyd Parade
Hawthorne Canal	2.3	1.4	Bridge (no known official name)	
Lilyfield	2.9	1.8	Inner West Light Rail	
Lilyfield	3.8	2.4	Inner West Light Rail	
Lilyfield	4.2	2.6	M8 Motorway (M8) – St Peters, Kingsgrove, Sydney Airport	
Lilyfield–Annandale boundary	4.5	2.8	The Crescent (south) – Forest Lodge	Eastern end of City West Link, western end of The Crescent
Rozelle	5.0	3.1	Victoria Road (A40) – Balmain, Ryde, Parramatta	
Rozelle	5.0	3.1	Western Distributor (A4) – Pyrmont, Sydney CBD	Eastern terminus of road, eastern end of The Crescent; Eastern terminus of route A44, route A4 continues east along Western Distributor
Tolled; Route transition
