= Iron Cove Creek =

Iron Cove
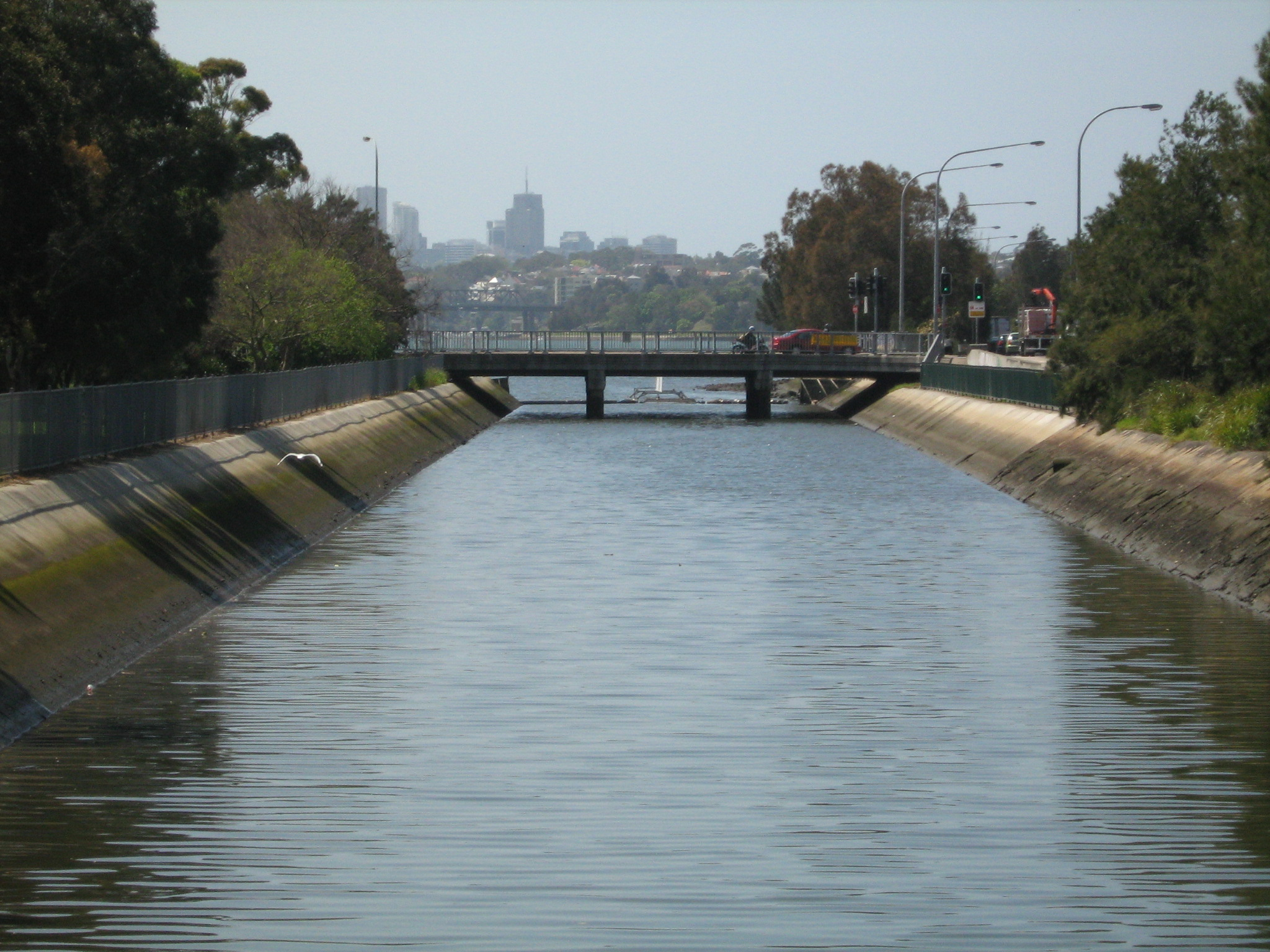
- Iron Cove Creek looking towards Iron Cove.

Location
- Country: Australia
- State: New South Wales
- Municipality: Sydney

Physical characteristics
- Source: Ashfield Park
  - location: Ashfield
  - coordinates: 33°53′20″S 151°7′30″E
- Mouth: Parramatta River
  - location: Iron Cove
  - coordinates: 33°52′13.4862″S 151°8′31.02″E

Basin features
- River system: Parramatta River

Iron Cove Creek (also known as Dobroyd Stormwater Channel), a southern tributary of the Parramatta River, is an urban stream west of Sydney Harbour, located in the inner-western Sydney suburbs of Croydon, Ashfield, Haberfield and Five Dock in New South Wales, Australia.

Iron Cove Creek traverses mostly through residential areas and parkland, making a 2 kilometres (1.2 mi) journey from where it surfaces in Croydon to where it empties into Iron Cove, which is a bay of the Parramatta River, at Five Dock. It also forms much of the border between Croydon and Ashfield upstream from Parramatta Road. Once a natural watercourse abound with native vegetation and wildlife, Iron Cove Creek was transformed in the late 19th century into a stormwater channel that drains a fairly large catchment area in Sydney's inner-western suburbs.

== History ==
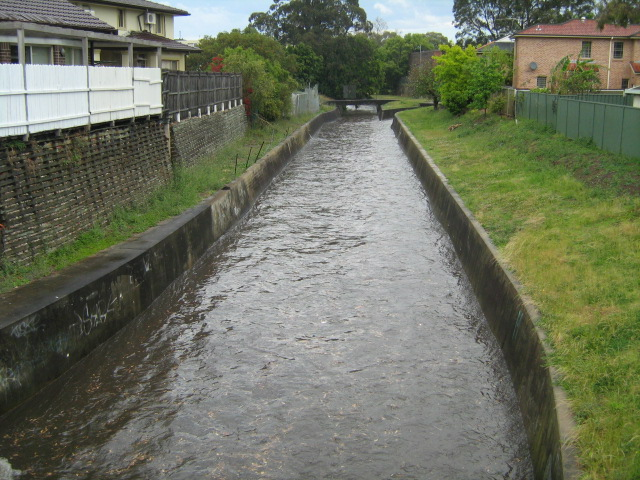
Iron Cove Creek flowing swiftly after a thunderstorm. Looking upstream from the Church Street bridge, Croydon, NSW

In the 1860s Iron Cove Creek was a freely flowing waterway which in places broadened into ponds that made excellent and picturesque swimming holes. Water birds and snakes were abundant in this area and these, like the possums and gliders that inhabited the treetops, often fell victim to the predations of children with improvised bows and arrows and slingshots and their elders armed with more sophisticated weapons.

During the 1890s the character and appearance of Iron Cove Creek was dramatically altered. As early as 1880 Iron Cove Creek was perceived to present hazards both to the health and convenience of the local community; it tended to flood in heavy rain and to become stagnant during dry weather and, with the sanitary conditions that then prevailed, was a source of typhoid fever. Plans were made to concrete its banks, but major work did not commence until 1891. The construction of the banks was carried out by the Department of Public Works and was supervised by a local resident, William Best Chessell. It took five years and had a profound effect on the appearance and future development of Croydon. In his book Between Two Highways: the story of early Croydon, Eric Dunlop points out that as a result of the construction of canals and tunnels:

the waters now drained away quickly, the swamps and pools disappeared, and as the banks of the main stream were filled in and leveled to the edges of the canal its wooded foreshores vanished and more land became available for settlement.

== Present course ==
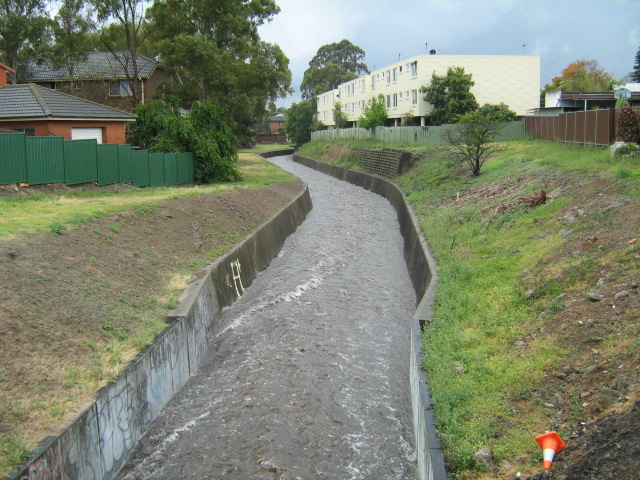
A rapid Iron Cove Creek flowing downstream from the John St bridge after a thunderstorm, Ashfield, NSW.

Iron Cove Creek begins as a tiny trickle in a narrow channel near Norton Street in Croydon, where it appears as a stormwater tunnel finally exiting into daylight. From here, it makes its way through a cement cutting only a few metres wide with high concrete walls on either side and passes under the Main Suburban railway line. From here until Parramatta Road it remains just a small trickle during dry weather. The canal is bounded by the fences of commercial and residential properties as well as a barbed wire fence along Etonville Parade, and is for the most part hidden from the public eye.

The creek's character does not change until it reaches the John Street bridge where the concreted channel widens significantly and the height of the banks drops about threefold. From John Street to West Street, Iron Cove Creek is flanked by a wide grass verge covered with various types of vegetation leaving potential for a recreational walking/cycling path beside the creek. There is also ample space for bush regeneration to take place by the planting of indigenous species. About 100 metres (330 ft) downstream from West Street is the Parramatta Road bridge, which marks the approximate tidal limit of the creek. Adjacent to the creek on Parramatta Road are popular fast-food restaurants, a council depot and a service station. After flowing under the Parramatta Road bridge, Iron Cove Creek finally enters public parkland and becomes a broad channel probably similar to the width of the original channel. On the right is parkland and running parallel to the creek on the left bank of is Henley Marine Drive. Iron Cove Creek then passes beneath Ramsay Street, widens further, and proceeds through parkland including Timbrell Park.

The creek is very tidal here and the water level difference between low and high tide is significant. The tidal limit of Dobroyd Canal is located 100 metres (330 ft) upstream of Parramatta Road. Mullet may also be seen in the lower reaches of Iron Cove Creek below Parramatta Road at high tide.

The creek empties into Iron Cove as a broad canal at the intersection of Timbrell Drive and Dobroyd Parade at Five Dock, where there is a floating boom across the creek that is designed to stop pollution entering Port Jackson.

Between Parramatta Road and Iron Cove, Iron Cove Creek forms part of the border between the federal electoral divisions of Reid and Grayndler following a 2009 redistribution.

== Church Street bridge ==
The Church Street bridge spans Iron Cove Creek on the border of the inner-western suburbs of Croydon and Ashfield. The bridge is built of sandstone, brick, and steel. The course of Church Street was originally defined by the track used by Burwood residents to attend St John's Ashfield, who crossed the Creek at a conveniently located large fallen tree.

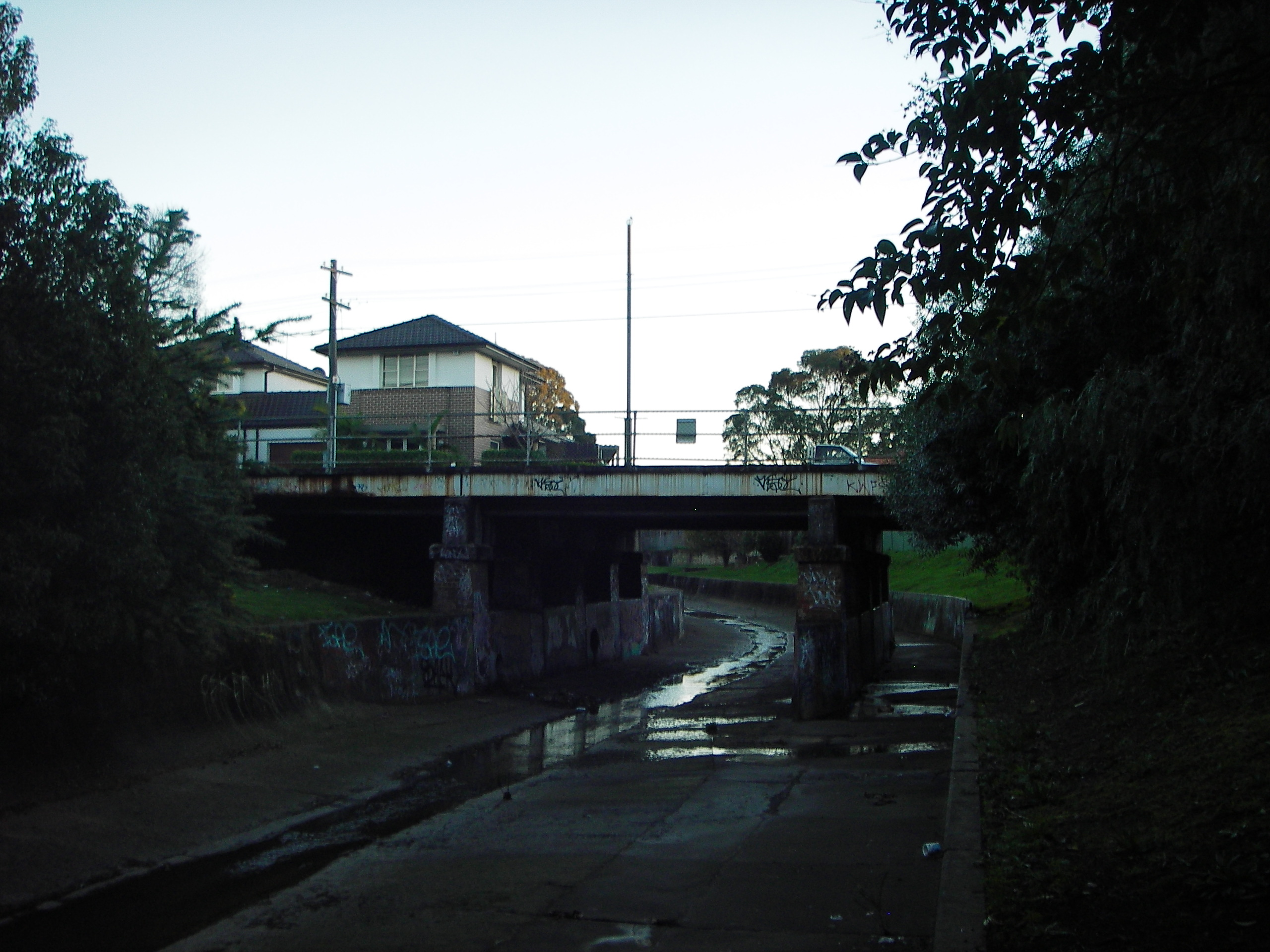
Iron Cove Creek and the Church St bridge looking upstream

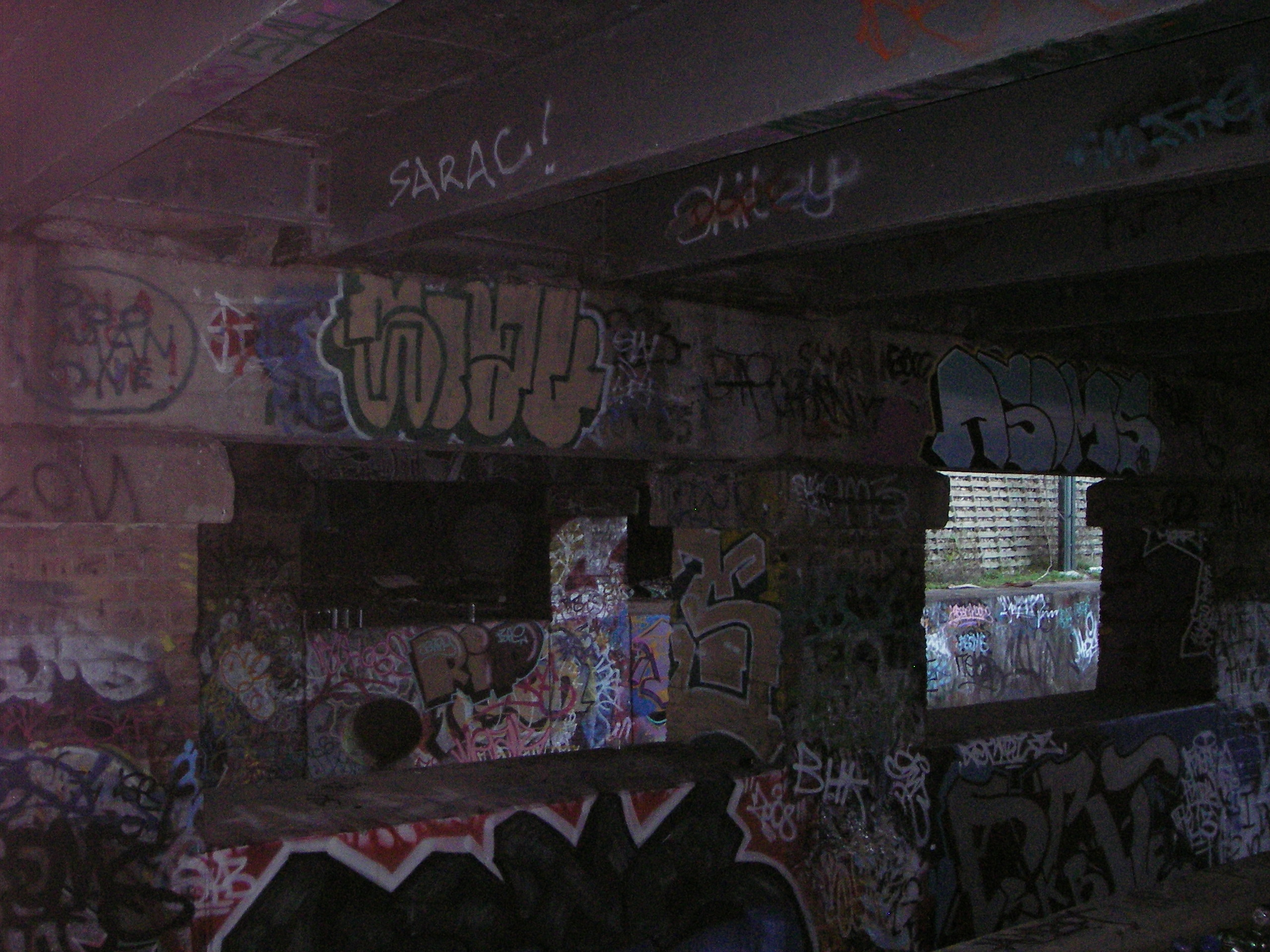
Under the Church Street bridge

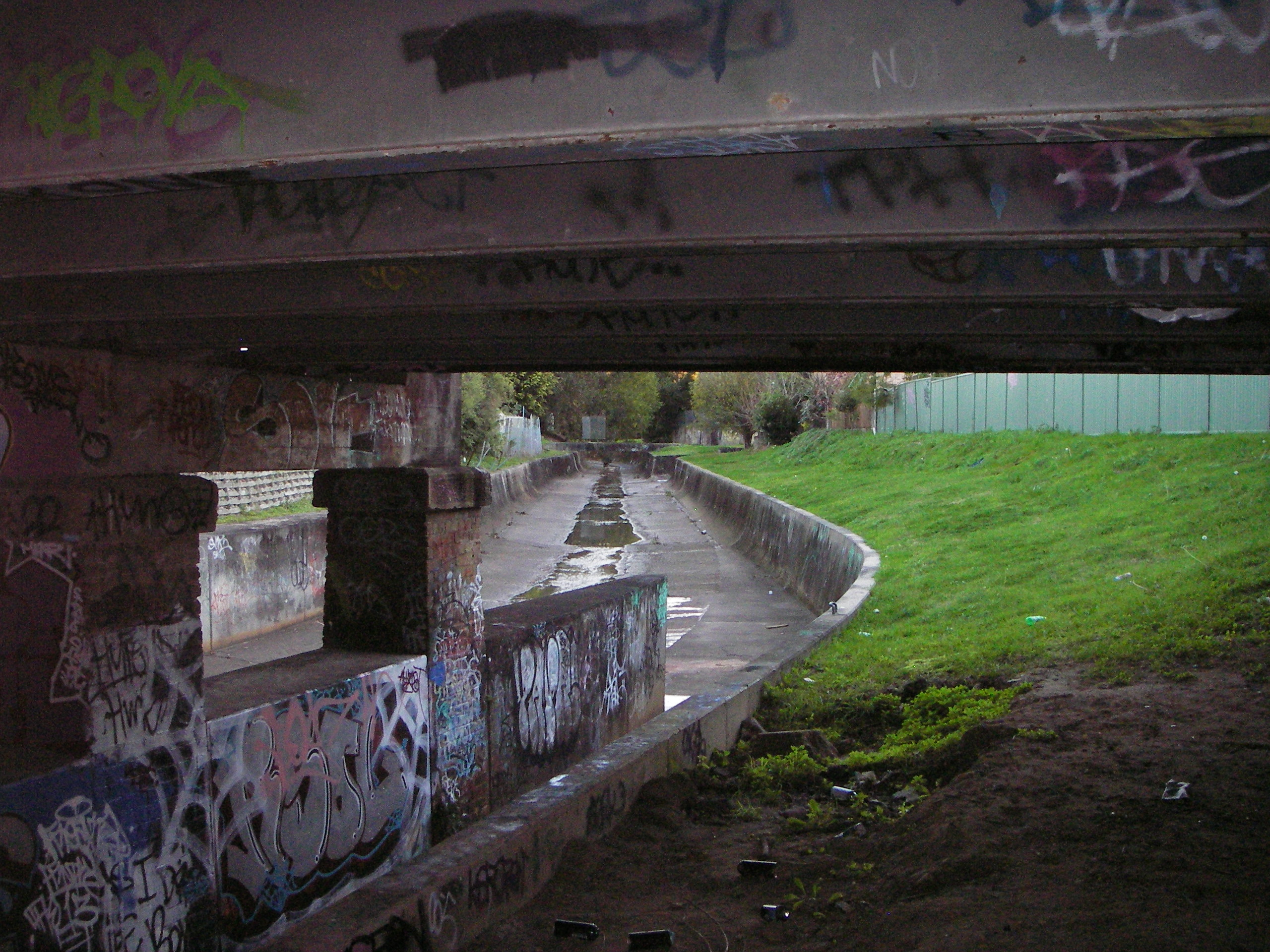
Under the Church St bridge and Iron Cove Creek

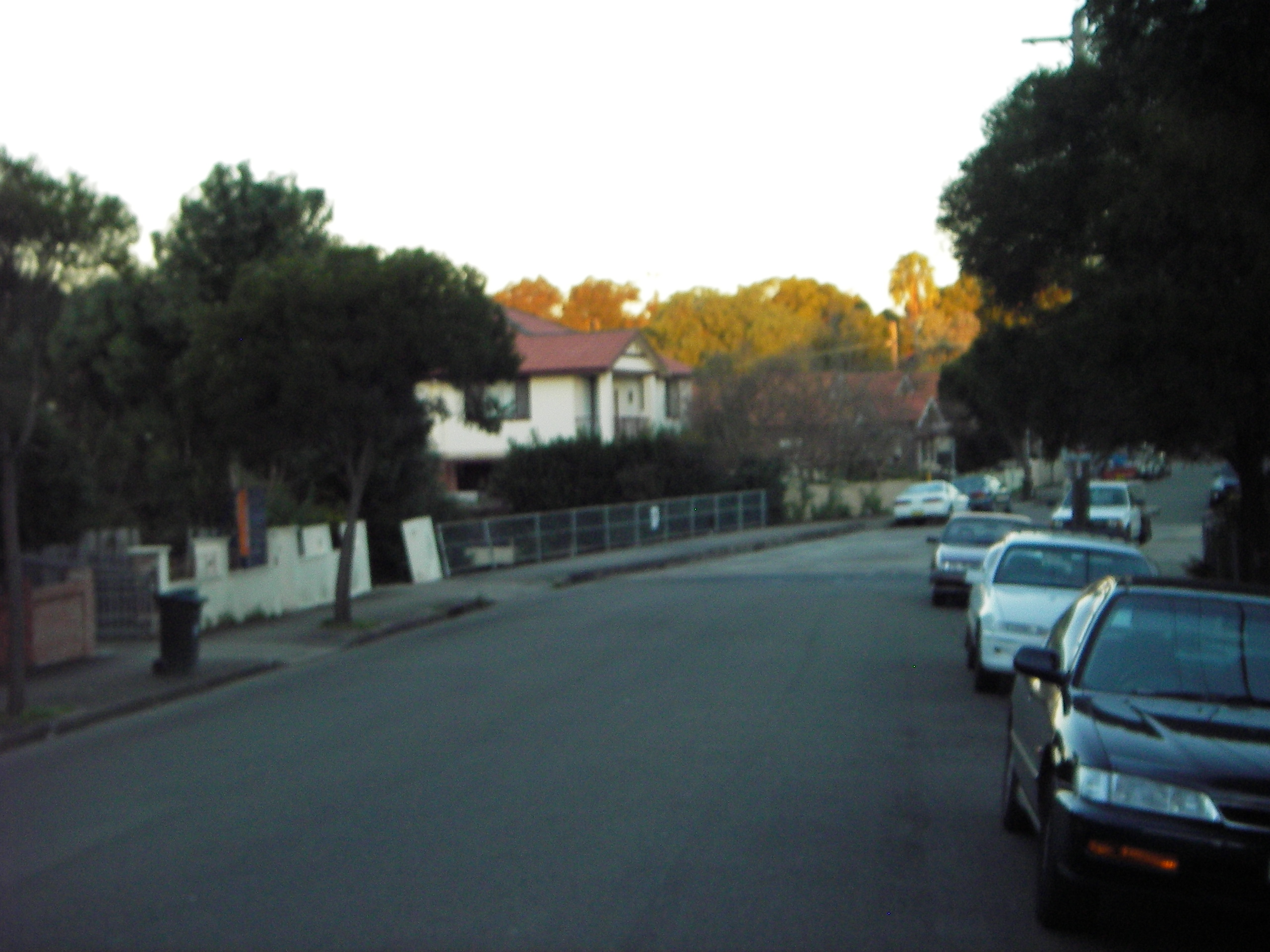
View of Church Street looking over Iron Cove Creek from Croydon into Ashfield

== Pollution ==
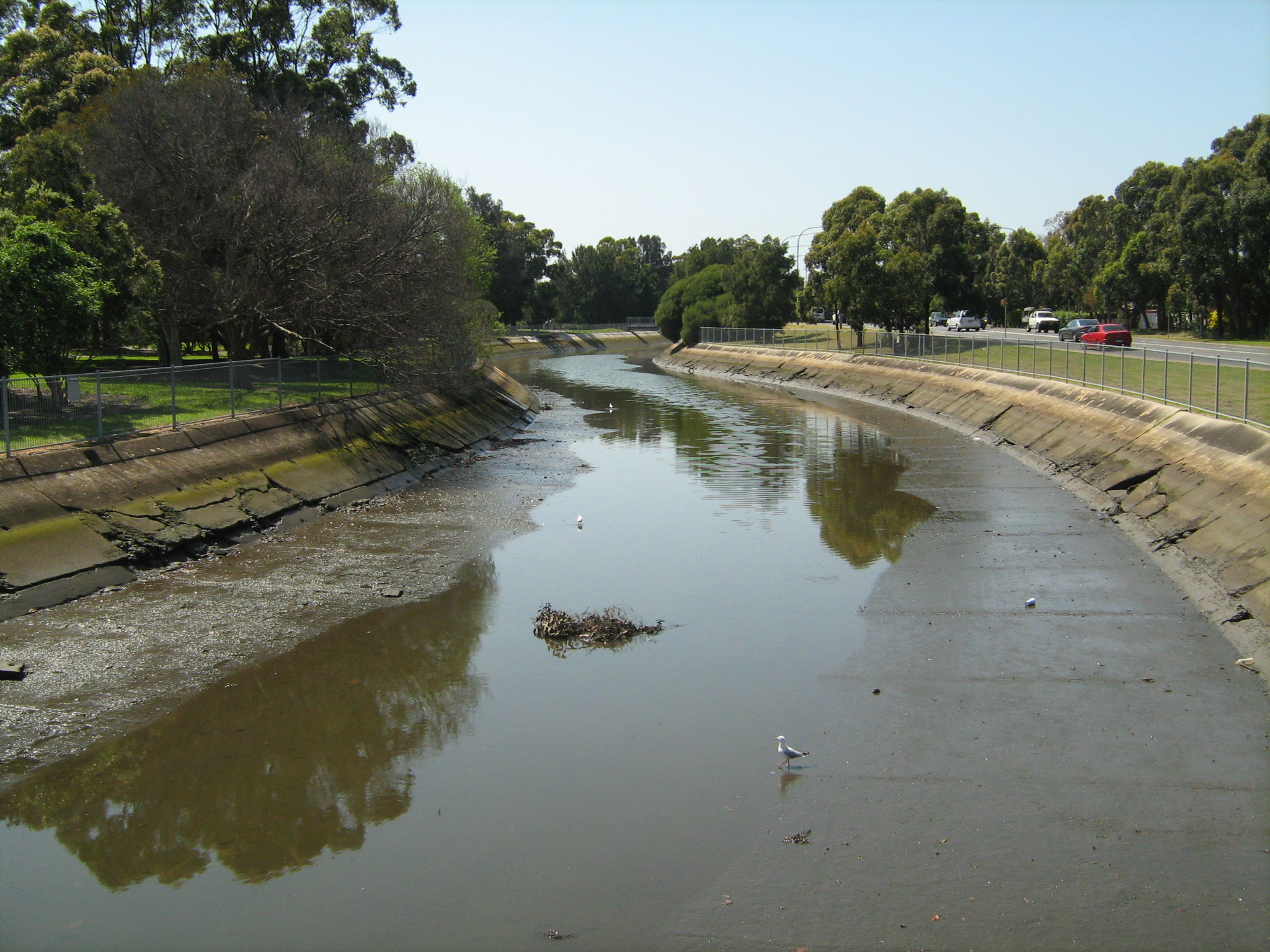
The lower reaches of Iron Cove Creek beside Dobroyd Pde, Five Dock at low tide.

Pollution entering Iron Cove from Iron Cove Creek poses as a serious environmental problem as materials such as heavy metals, asphalt, road dust and various nutrients flow into the creek during rainfall. This problem is enhanced by the fact popular fast-food restaurants and a service station are located adjacent to Iron Cove Creek on Parramatta Road. Also, the concrete lining of the creek prevents the growth of natural vegetation such as mangroves which assist in maintaining water quality.

Iron Cove Creek supplies water and sediment enriched in copper, lead and zinc to the Iron Cove under low flow conditions and is a major source of contaminants. Increasing salinity in the lower sections of Iron Cove Creek largely controls partitioning between the particulate and dissolved phases of copper, lead and zinc. Contaminant loading to Iron Cove may be contingent on extended periods of low flow rather than high flow events during which contaminated material is rapidly exported from the estuary in a discrete surface layer. This unusual characteristic offers attractive possibilities for remediation of stormwater entering Port Jackson.

== Gallery ==
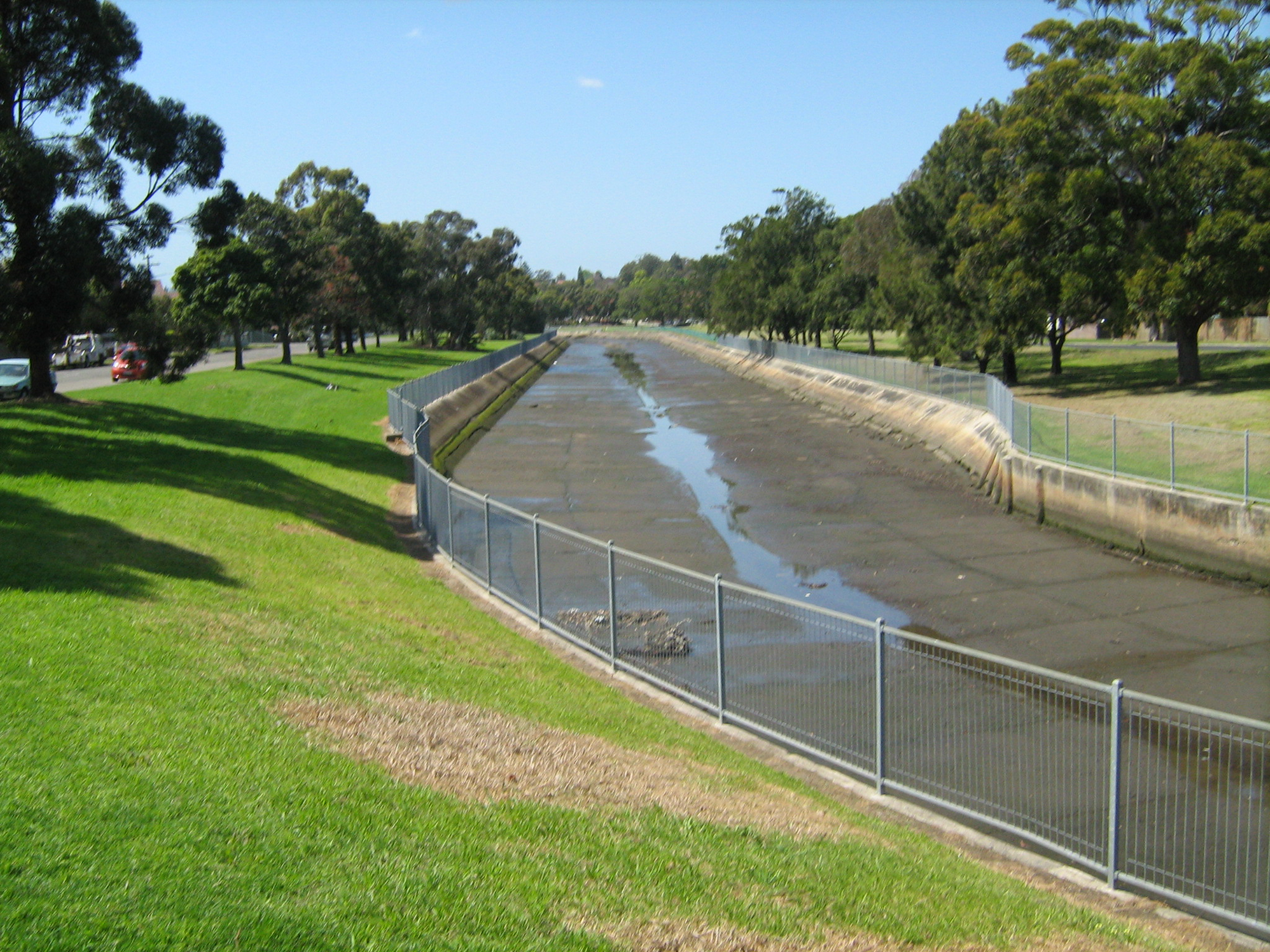
Iron Cove Creek looking downstream at low tide from Ramsay St, Five Dock.

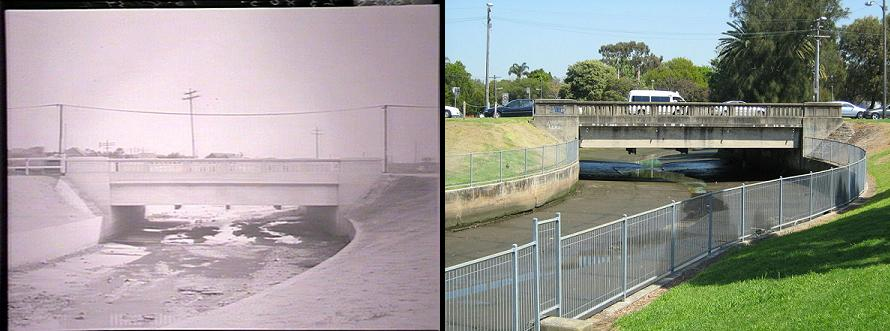
The Iron Cove Creek bridge on Ramsay Street at Five Dock showing contrasting views of the same location in 1931 and in 2007.

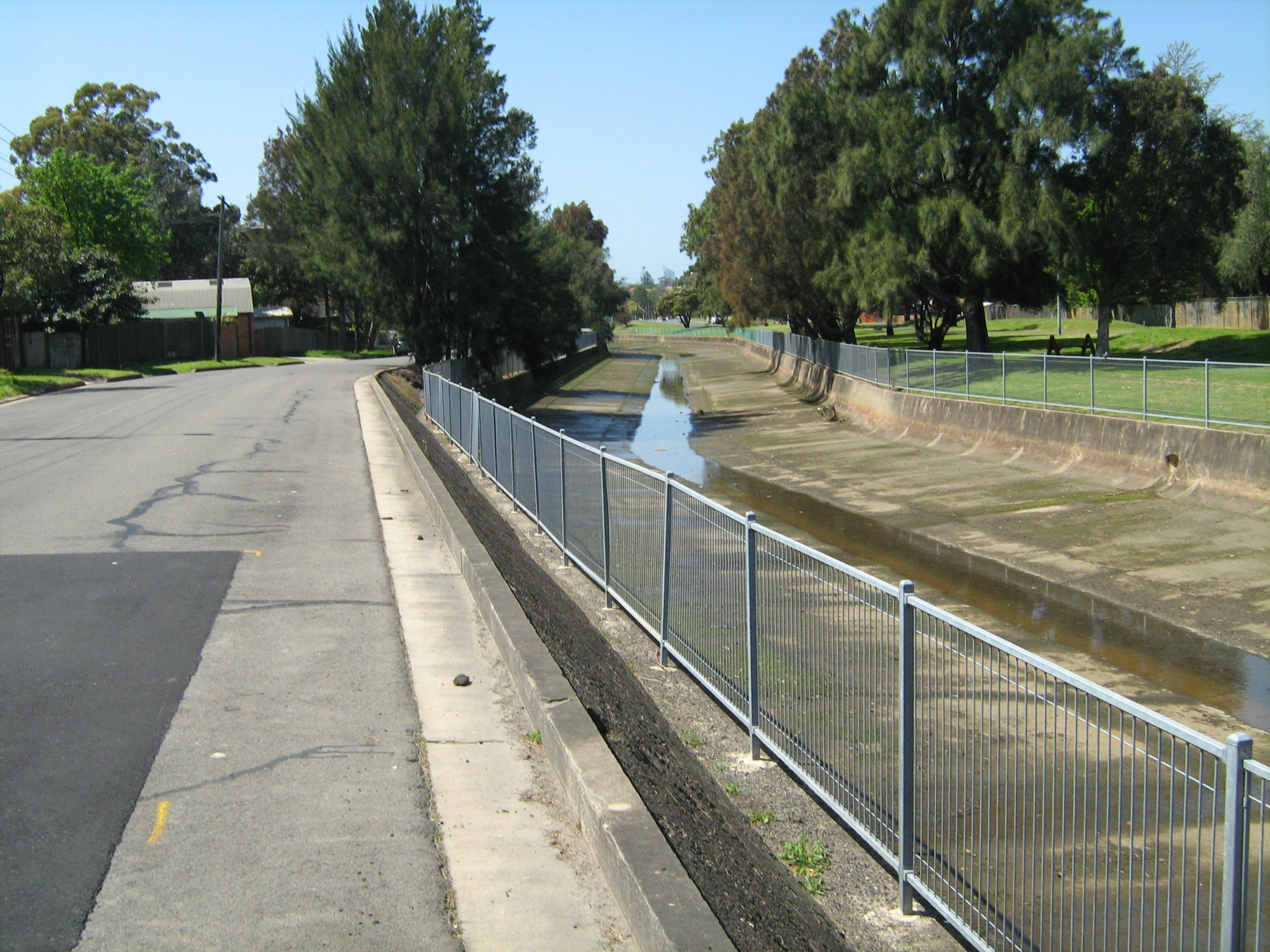
Iron Cove Creek sandwiched between Henley Marine Drive and Wadim (Bill) Jegorow Reserve about 200 metres downstream from Parramatta Road.

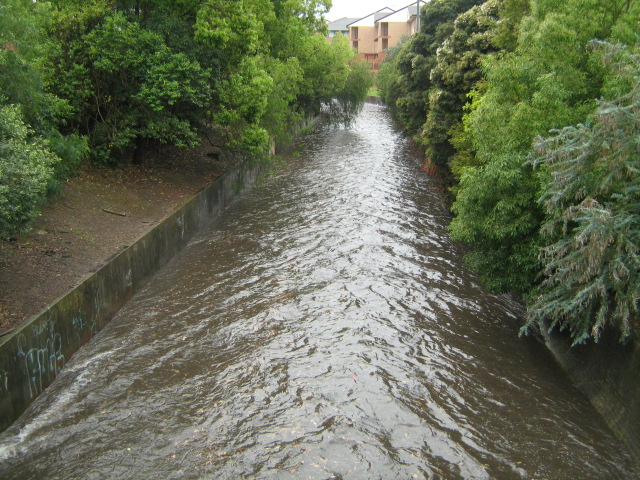
Iron Cove Creek looking downstream from the Church Street bridge after a thunderstorm.

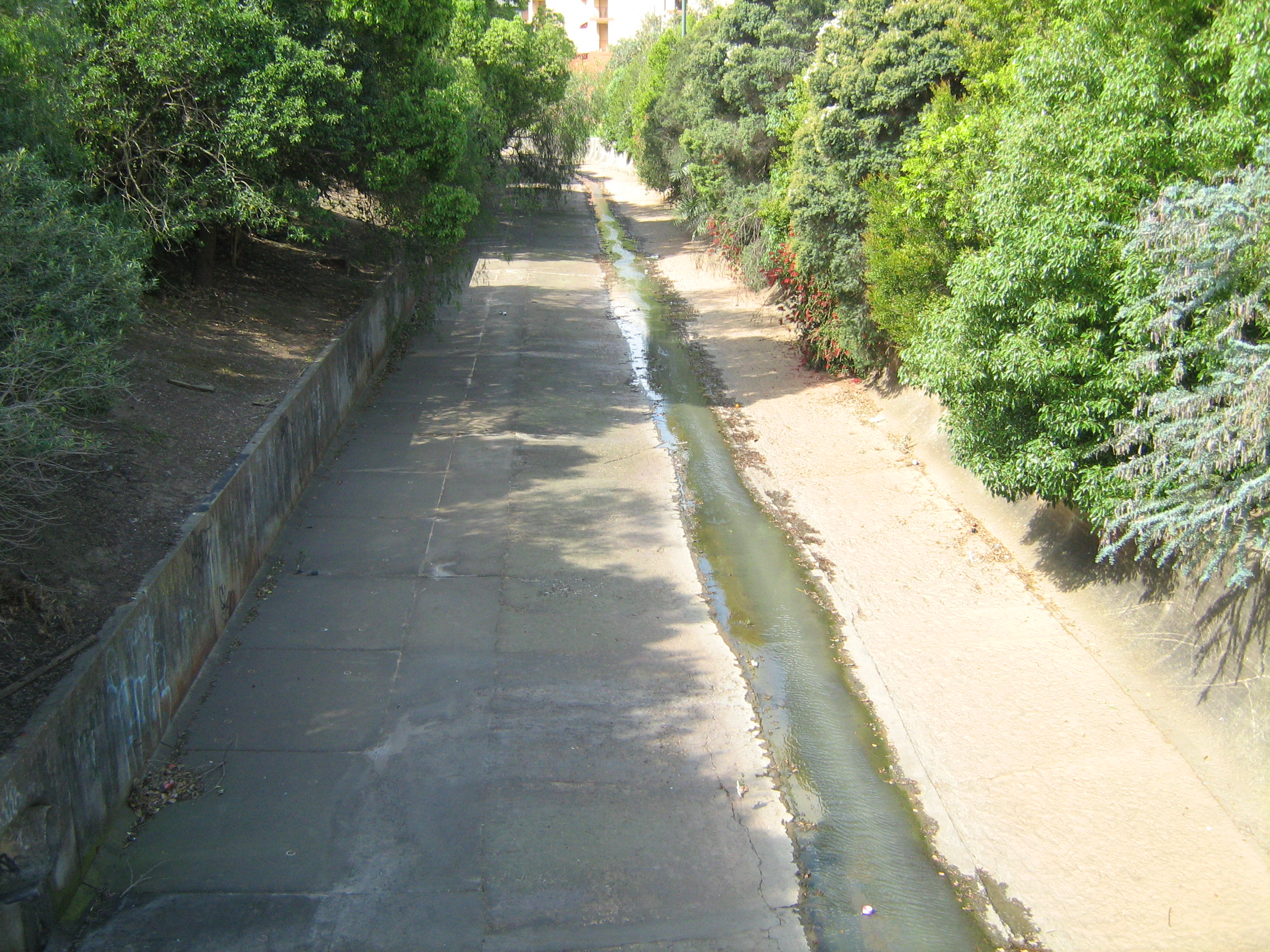
Looking downstream from the Church Street bridge during dry weather.

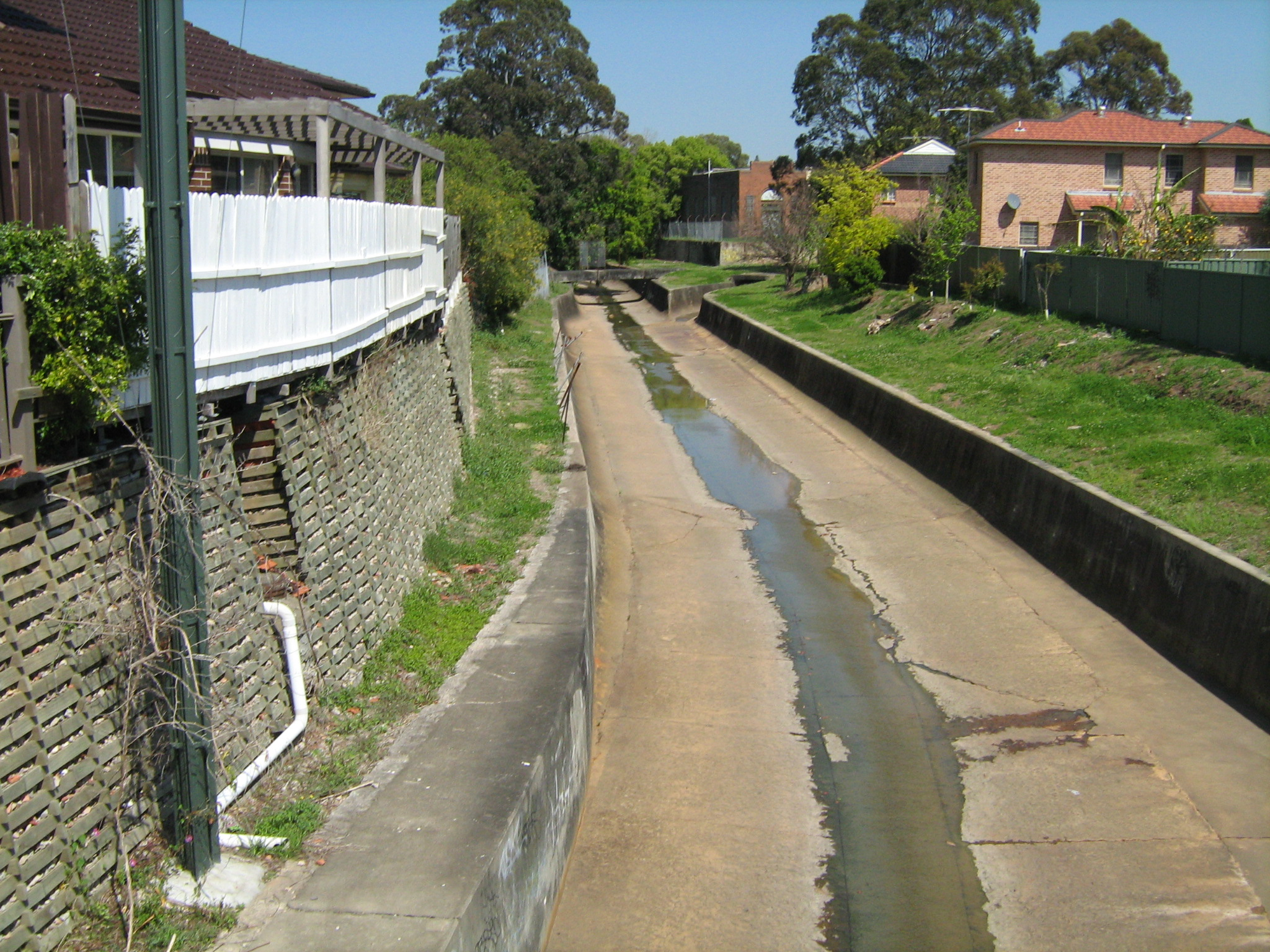
Looking upstream from the Church Street bridge during dry weather.

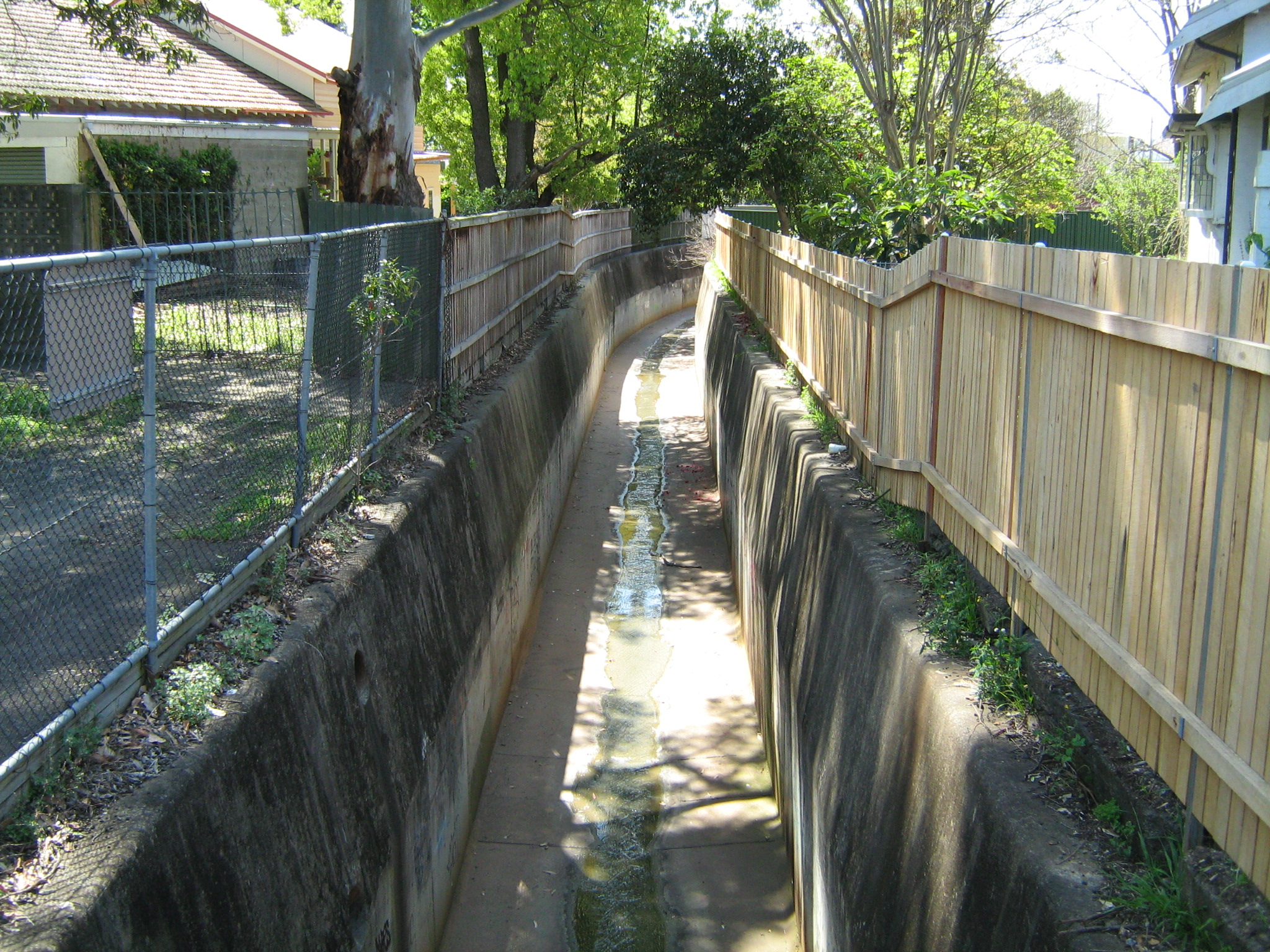
A narrow Iron Cove Creek at the end of Gregory St, Croydon.

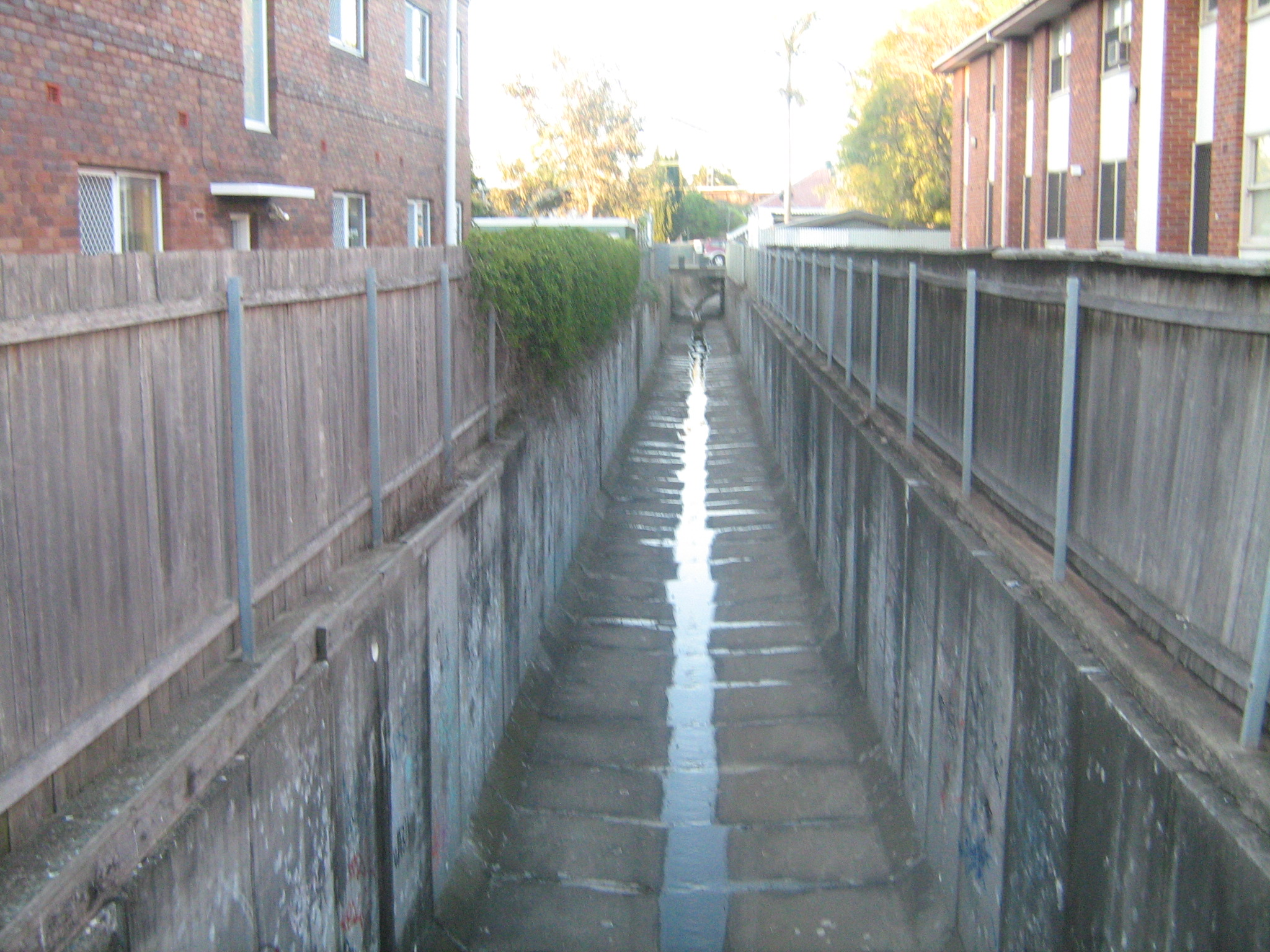
The upper most reaches of Iron Cove Creek viewed from Thomas Street, Croydon.
