= Western Distributor (Sydney) =

Motorway in New South Wales, Australia

Western Distributor New South Wales
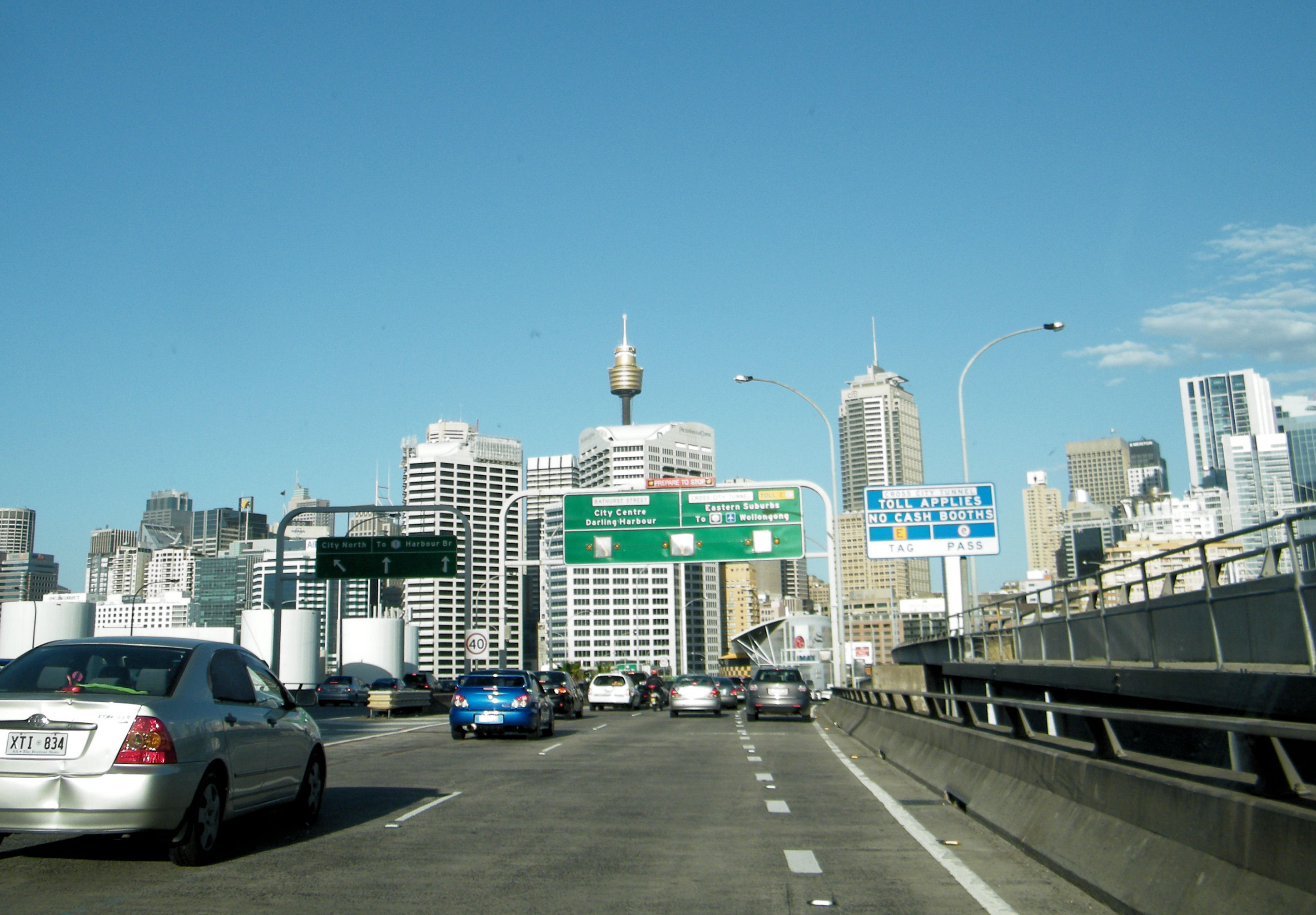
- Eastbound traffic on Western Distributor travelling into the Sydney CBD
- Coordinates: 33.860353°S 151.205844°E (East end); 33.869021°S 151.176438°E (West end)

General information
- Type: Motorway
- Length: 4.3 km (2.7 mi)
- Opened: 1972
- Gazetted: January 1993
- Route number(s): A4 (2013–present)
- Former route number: Metroad 4 (2000–2013); State Route 40 (1981–2013); Entire route; Metroad 2 (1993–2007); National Route 1 (1986–1992); (CBD–Ultimo)

Major junctions
- East end: Bradfield Highway; Millers Point, Sydney
- King Street; Cross City Tunnel; Bathurst Street; Pyrmont Bridge Road; Victoria Road
- West end: City West Link; Rozelle, Sydney

Location(s)
- Major suburbs / towns: Sydney, Pyrmont, Rozelle

Highway system
- Highways in Australia; National Highway • Freeways in Australia; Highways in New South Wales

Western Distributor is a 4.3-kilometre-long (2.7 mi) grade-separated motorway that is primarily elevated for the majority of its route on the western fringe of the Sydney central business district. It links the southern end of Bradfield Highway at the Sydney Harbour Bridge to Victoria Road in Rozelle, at its western terminus near White Bay. It is a constituent part of the A4 route.

== Route ==
The freeway distributes traffic arriving from the north via the Sydney Harbour Bridge while collecting traffic from the CBD, distributing it through Pyrmont and Ultimo before crossing over the Anzac Bridge. In the citybound direction, traffic is collected from Victoria Road and the City West Link, as well as various on ramps in the Pyrmont and Ultimo areas. Traffic is distributed into the CBD through various off ramps in Pyrmont and the western edge of the CBD, as well as into the Cross City Tunnel. The remaining traffic is fed onto the Sydney Harbour Bridge

The Rozelle Interchange as part of WestConnex was completed in 2023 providing a freeway-standard route free of traffic lights from the Sydney CBD to Emu Plains.

== History ==
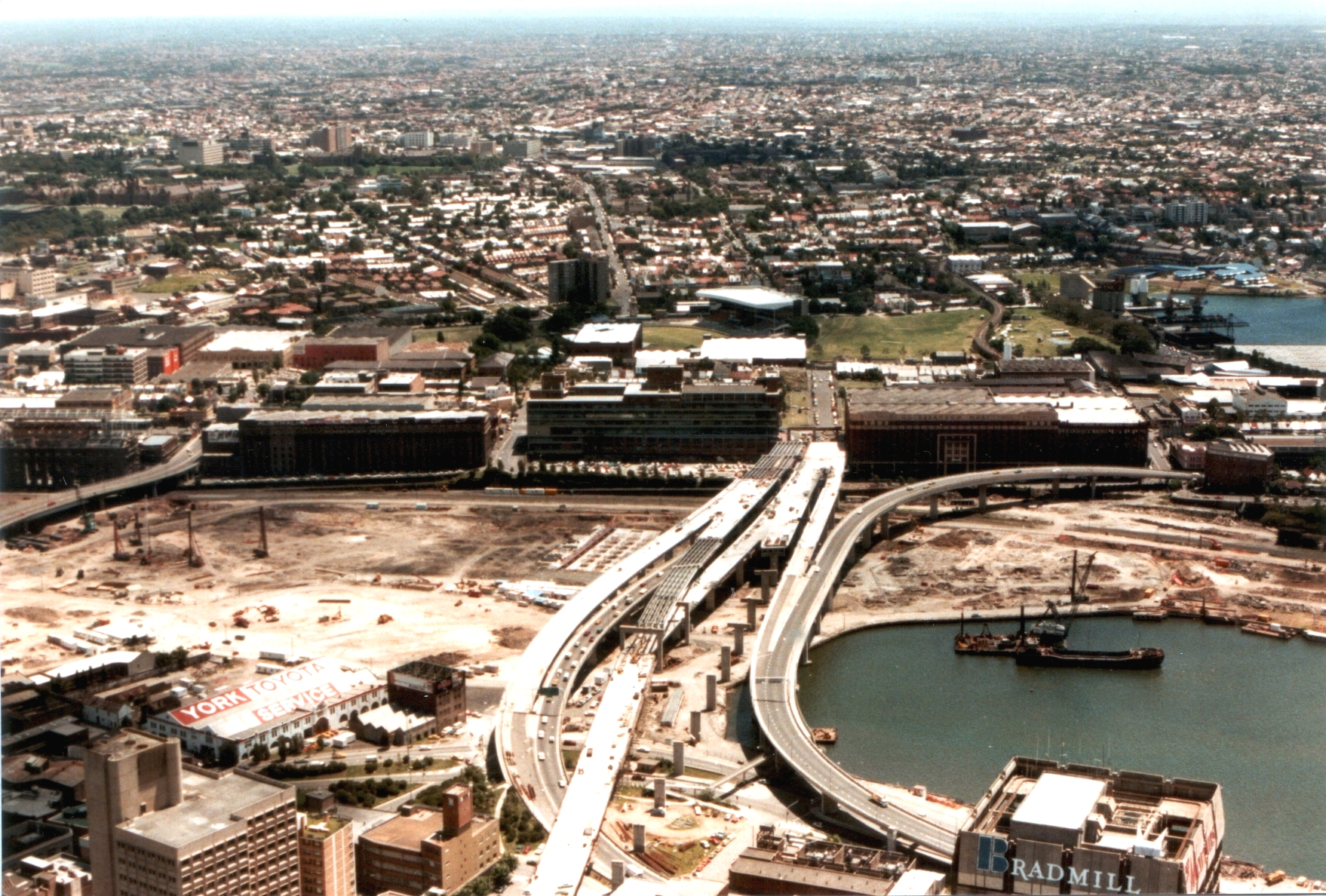
Construction of the Western Distributor during the 1980s over the site of the Darling Harbour Yard

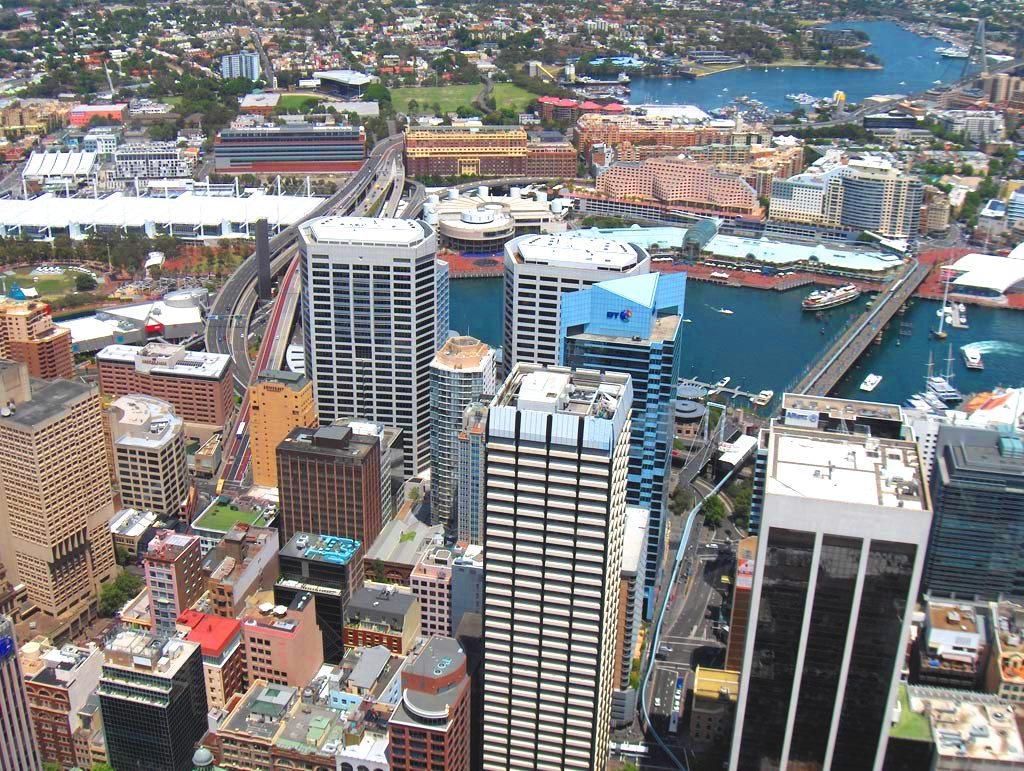
Western Distributor in 2006 (overpass on extreme top-right and middle-left of the picture)

The Western Distributor came to be out of the realisation in the early 1960s that the existing roads that supported the Harbour Bridge would not cope with contemporary and projected traffic volumes. Due to existing infrastructure and buildings in the area, it was decided to build a viaduct to carry traffic above the city streets.

The government decided in principle to proceed with the Western Distributor (from "near city markets area" to Ultimo) during the year ended Jun 1960.

The southbound carriageway from the Sydney Harbour Bridge to Day Street opened 2 September 1972, the northbound carriageway on 30 September 1972, with the final stage connecting ramp from Pyrmont Bridge to the distributor’s northbound carriageway via Day Street opened 20 December 1972.

Around 1978 or afterwards, the DMR was opening up the Western Distributor. The Traffic Authority was operating, and it decided to repaint the lane markings with one bus lane and two vehicle lanes on the Druitt Street off ramp, however "at midnight that entire ramp that was going to serve Druitt Street got concreted off". Bob Morris stated it was a "giant power struggle between organizations".

On 24 May 1980, the westbound Day Street to Harris Street section over the Darling Harbour Yard opened bypassing the Pyrmont Bridge. The eastbound section between Harris and Sussex streets opened on 7 August 1981 with the Pyrmont Bridge closed. On 8 November 1981 the interim westbound route via Sussex Street and Day Place was replaced by a ramp from Market Street > The final stage opened in December 1995 with the Anzac Bridge replacing the Glebe Island Bridge.

The north-eastbound viaduct ramps leading towards Bradfield Highway, designed in 1967, was widened from 19 to 30 metres (62 to 98 ft) to accommodate a deck with a variable width from 2.3 to 5.5 metres (7 ft 7 in to 18 ft 1 in) and consists of a steel structure supported on reinforced concrete corbels.

The Roads & Traffic Authority re-aligned the eastern end of Main Road 165 from its old route from Pyrmont, to the southern toll plaza of the Sydney Harbour Bridge at Millers Point to the interchange with Pyrmont Bridge Road and Bank Street in Pyrmont (and continuing west across Bank Street and Glebe Island Bridge to Rozelle and along Victoria Road to Parramatta) on 22 January 1993, later amended to use the Anzac Bridge instead on 28 February 2003. Despite its role as a grade-separated motorway, the road is not officially gazetted as one by Transport for NSW classification, and is still considered today to be a main road.

The passing of the Roads Act of 1993 updated road classifications and the way they could be declared within New South Wales. Under this act, Western Distributor retains its declaration as part of Main Road 165.

Western Distributor was signed State Route 40 in 1981, and followed the route's re-alignment when Anzac Bridge opened in 1995. Its eastern half was also declared part of National Route 1, when it was re-aligned from its old route through the CBD along York and Clarence streets to its new route along Western Distributor to Harris Street (and continuing south along Harris Street to meet Princes Highway at Chippendale) in 1986, and removed when the Sydney Harbour Tunnel opened in 1992. It was quickly replaced in 1993 by Metroad 2 along the same alignment (and continuing south along Harris and Wattle Streets to terminate at Ultimo) until the Lane Cove Tunnel opened in 2007 and Metroad 2 was truncated to meet Gore Hill Freeway in Lane Cove. The whole route was also designated part of Metroad 4 when its eastern end was re-aligned on the opening of City West Link in 2000. With the conversion to the newer alphanumeric system in 2013, State Route 40 was removed and Metroad 4 was replaced by route A4.

=== Western end ===
When it was built, it was described as the southern end of the F3 Freeway, as that was where the North West Freeway was intended to finish, however due to protests from inner city residents, this plan never came to fruition. Western Distributor ends west of the Anzac Bridge western ramp and east of the junction between Victoria Road and City West Link, with traffic fed onto either of these roads.

=== Abandoned section ===
Under the Western Distributor viaduct ramps at its northern end, between Sussex and Kent streets, there is an abandoned carriageway underneath the main roadway. It is a short section of elevated freeway; the top tier remains in constant use but the lower is suspended in the air; having been severed at each end.

=== "Western Distributor Smart Motorway" Upgrade ===
In 2024, the Federal and New South Wales Governments invested $179 million to build 19 new gantries and upgrade four existing gantries with incident detection technology, CCTV coverage and electronic signage. Speed limits are electronically controlled. On 9 December 2024 the technology was switched on.

=== Western Distributor Road Network Improvements project ===
After "analysis of traffic patterns and further stakeholder engagement", in March 2026 Transport for NSW refined the Western Distributor Road Network Improvements project (WDRNI). The "Darling Harbour weave ramp" was cancelled. Plans to provide three eastbound lanes on Allen Street were retained, with construction expected to begin in late 2026 for two right-turn lanes onto the Southern Arterial Route. "The Western Distributor Network" project page was deleted. This page linked to the Harris Street Bus Relocation 'Have Your Say' Project Notification (and map), which is no longer accessible on the new project page. Benefits of the project were removed from an older version of the project page and are not shown on the current page.

== Exits and interchanges ==
LGA	Location	km	mi	Destinations	Notes
Sydney	Millers Point	0.0	0.0	Bradfield Highway - North Sydney	Northern terminus of Western Distributor and route A4; Continues north as Bradfield Highway
Sydney	Millers Point	0.0	0.0	Toll on southbound traffic from Bradfield Highway only, no toll northbound	
Sydney	Sydney	0.3	0.19	Grosvenor Street (one-way eastbound) – Sydney CBD; York Street (one-way southbound) – Sydney CBD	Southbound exits only
Sydney	Sydney	0.4	0.25	Clarence Street (one-way northbound) – Sydney CBD; Kent Street – Sydney CBD	Northbound entrances only
Sydney	Sydney	1.0	0.62	Sussex Street (one-way southbound) – Sydney CBD; King Street (one-way eastbound) – Sydney CBD	Northbound exit only
Sydney	Sydney	1.3	0.81	Sussex Street (one-way southbound) – Sydney CBD; Market Street (one-way westbound) – Sydney CBD	Southbound entrance only
Sydney	Sydney	1.6	0.99	Harbour Street – Haymarket	Southbound exit and northbound entrance only via underpass
Sydney	Sydney	1.6	0.99	Druitt Street (one-way westbound) – Sydney CBD; Bathurst Street (one-way eastbound) – Sydney CBD	Westbound exit and eastbound entrance only
Sydney	Sydney	1.6	0.99	Cross City Tunnel – East Sydney, Rushcutters Bay, to Eastern Distributor (M1 south)	Westbound entrance and eastbound exit only
Sydney	Sydney–Pyrmont boundary	2.0	1.2	Pyrmont Street – Pyrmont, Ultimo	Eastbound entrance only
Sydney	Pyrmont–Ultimo boundary	2.1	1.3	Harris Street – Pyrmont, Ultimo; Fig Street – Pyrmont, Ultimo	Eastbound exit and westbound entrance only
Sydney	Pyrmont	2.4	1.5	Allen Street – Ultimo	Eastbound exit only
Sydney	Pyrmont	2.6	1.6	Pyrmont Bridge Road (east) – Pyrmont; Bridge Road (west) – Sydney Fish Market, Glebe; Bank Street (north) – Pyrmont	Westbound entrance from Pyrmont Bridge Road via Bank Street; Eastbound exit to Bridge Road via Bank Street
Johnstons Bay		3.4	2.1	Anzac Bridge	
Inner West	Rozelle	4.0	2.5	M4 Motorway (M4) - Parramatta; Iron Cove Link - Ryde, Parramatta	Eastbound exit and westbound entrance only
Inner West	Rozelle	4.3	2.7	Victoria Road (A40) - Balmain, Ryde, Parramatta	
Inner West	Rozelle	4.3	2.7	City West Link (A44) - Haberfield, Parramatta, Penrith	Western terminus of Western Distributor, continues west as City West Link
1.000 mi = 1.609 km; 1.000 km = 0.621 mi: Incomplete access; Tolled; Route transition

== In popular culture ==
The road is referenced in the song "Hay Plain" by Australian artist Julia Jacklin.
