= Victoria Road, Sydney =

Road in Sydney, New South Wales, Australia

Victoria Road New South Wales
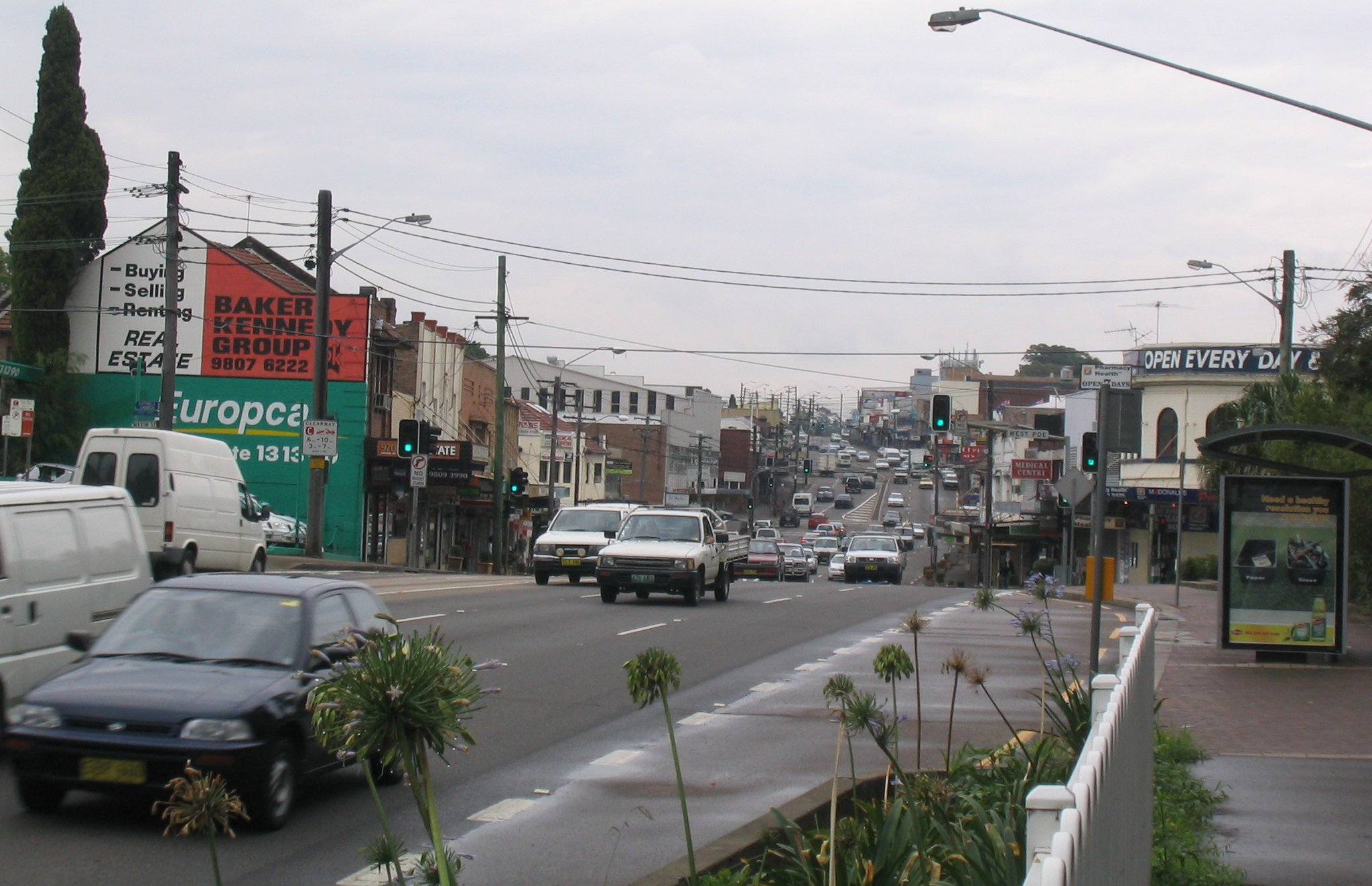
- Victoria Road at West Ryde
- Location in metropolitan Sydney
- Coordinates: 33.808185°S 151.001676°E (West end); 33.868909°S 151.176256°E (East end)

General information
- Type: Road
- Length: 20.1 km (12 mi)
- Gazetted: August 1928
- Route number(s): A40 (2013–present) (North Parramatta–Rozelle)
- Former route number: State Route 40 (1974–2013) (North Parramatta–Rozelle); A40 (2013-2026) (Rozelle); Concurrency: State Route 21 (1974–2004) (Huntleys Point–Drummoyne)

Major junctions
- West end: O'Connell Street; Parramatta, Sydney
- James Ruse Drive; Silverwater Road; Devlin Street; Burns Bay Road; Lyons Road; Iron Cove Link
- East end: Western Distributor; City West Link; Rozelle, Sydney

Location(s)
- Major suburbs: Rydalmere, Ermington, West Ryde, Ryde, Gladesville, Drummoyne

Victoria Road is a major road in Sydney, New South Wales, Australia, connecting Parramatta with Rozelle and is currently one of the longest roads in Sydney. The road passes over two major bridges: the Iron Cove Bridge over Iron Cove, and the Gladesville Bridge over the Parramatta River.

== Route ==
Victoria Road commences at the intersection of O'Connell Street in Parramatta and heads east as a four-lane dual-carriageway road, passing over an interchange with James Ruse Drive in eastern Parramatta, under an interchange with Silverwater Road in Ermington, over another interchange with Devlin Street in Ryde, through Gladesville and Drummoyne, and terminating at a modified intersection with City West Link and Western Distributor at Rozelle. It is predominantly three lanes in each direction between Rozelle and Gladesville, and two or three lanes in each direction west of Gladesville. A large number of Busways and Transit Systems bus routes travel along Victoria Road, and during peak hours much of the road includes a dedicated bus lane.

In 2011 the road was named as one of the most congested road in Sydney with an average travel speed of 24 kilometres per hour (15 mph) during the morning peak period and 31 kilometres per hour (19 mph) in the afternoon peak.

== History ==
The passing of the Main Roads Act of 1924 through the Parliament of New South Wales provided for the declaration of Main Roads, roads partially funded by the State government through the Main Roads Board (later Transport for NSW). Main Road No. 165 was declared along this road on 8 August 1928, from Rozelle, Gladesville, along Kissing Point Road via Dundas, and along Pennant Street back along Victoria Road to Parramatta (and continuing east over the Glebe Island Bridge into Pyrmont); the alignment along Kissing Point Road via Dundas was altered to run via its current alignment through West Ryde on 2 December 1964.

In July 1955, a new four (later five) lane Iron Cove Bridge opened, followed in October 1964 by a new six (later seven) lane Gladesville Bridge, both replacing 1880s built two-lane structures.

In 2011, the Inner West Busway project introduced a tidal flow arrangement between Drummoyne and Rozelle which provides four city bound lanes (including a dedicated bus lane) and two west bound lanes in the morning peak, before reverting to three lanes in each direction at 10am. A barrier transfer machine is used to move the concrete barrier. This also saw a new three-lane Iron Cove Bridge built for out-bound traffic with the existing structure being solely used by inbound traffic.

The passing of the Roads Act of 1993 updated road classifications and the way they could be declared within New South Wales. Under this act, Victoria Road retains its declaration as part of Main Road 165.

The route was allocated State Route 40 in 1974 between Church Street in Parramatta and Rozelle (continuing north along Church Street and Windsor Road via Windsor eventually to Lithgow, and continuing east over Glebe Island Bridge to Pyrmont). State Route 21 was also declared along Victoria Road between Huntleys Point and Drummoyne (continuing north along Burns Bay Road, and continuing west along Lyons Road) as a concurrency in 1974; it was removed in 2004. The western end of State Route 40 was truncated to James Ruse Drive in North Parramatta in 2007 (and continuing north along James Ruse Drive and Old Windsor Road to Windsor instead). With the conversion to the newer alphanumeric system in 2013, State Route 40 was replaced by route A40.

In November 2023, the Rozelle Interchange opened, with the Iron Cove Link tunnel providing a bypass of Victoria Road between the Iron Cove Bridge and Anzac Bridge. In 2026, the A40 route was moved from this section of Victoria Road onto the Iron Cove Link.

== Major intersections ==
| LGA | Location | km | mi | Destinations | Notes |
|---|---|---|---|---|---|
| Parramatta | Parramatta | 0.0 | 0.0 | O'Connell Street – Parramatta, North Parramatta | Western terminus of road |
| Parramatta | Parramatta | 0.4 | 0.25 | Church Street – Parramatta, North Parramatta | |
| Parramatta | Parramatta | 2.0 | 1.2 | James Ruse Drive (A40 north, unallocated south) – Clyde, Rouse Hill, Windsor | No right turn eastbound into, and no right turn southbound from, James Ruse Drive; Route A40 continues north along James Ruse Drive |
| Parramatta | Rydalmere–Ermington boundary | 4.8 | 3.0 | Silverwater Road (A6) – Carlingford, Lidcombe, Padstow, Heathcote | No right turn westbound into Silverwater Road |
| Parramatta | Ermington–Melrose Park–West Ryde tripoint | 6.7 | 4.2 | Marsden Road (north) – Carlingford; Wharf Road (south) – Melrose Park | |
| Ryde | West Ryde | 8.5 | 5.3 | Main North railway line | |
| Ryde | Ryde | 10.1 | 6.3 | Devlin Street (A3) – Mona Vale, Macquarie Park, Wiley Park, Blakehurst | |
| Hunter's Hill | Huntleys Point | 15.6 | 9.7 | Burns Bay Road – Lane Cove North | |
| Parramatta River | | 15.8– 16.4 | 9.8– 10.2 | Gladesville Bridge | |
| Canada Bay | Drummoyne | 17.2 | 10.7 | Lyons Road – Five Dock | No right turn southbound into Lyons Road |
| Iron Cove | | 18.1– 18.6 | 11.2– 11.6 | Iron Cove Bridge | |
| Inner West | Rozelle | 18.9 | 11.7 | Iron Cove Link, to: – Western Distributor (A4 east) – Pyrmont, Sydney CBD – M8 Motorway (M8 south) – St Peters, Kingsgrove | Eastern entrance and western exit only. Route A40 continues along Iron Cove Link. |
| Inner West | Rozelle | 20.1 | 12.5 | Western Distributor (A4 east) – Pyrmont, Sydney CBD; City West Link (A44 west) – Haberfield, Parramatta, Penrith | Eastern terminus of road |
Incomplete access; Route transition

== Gallery ==
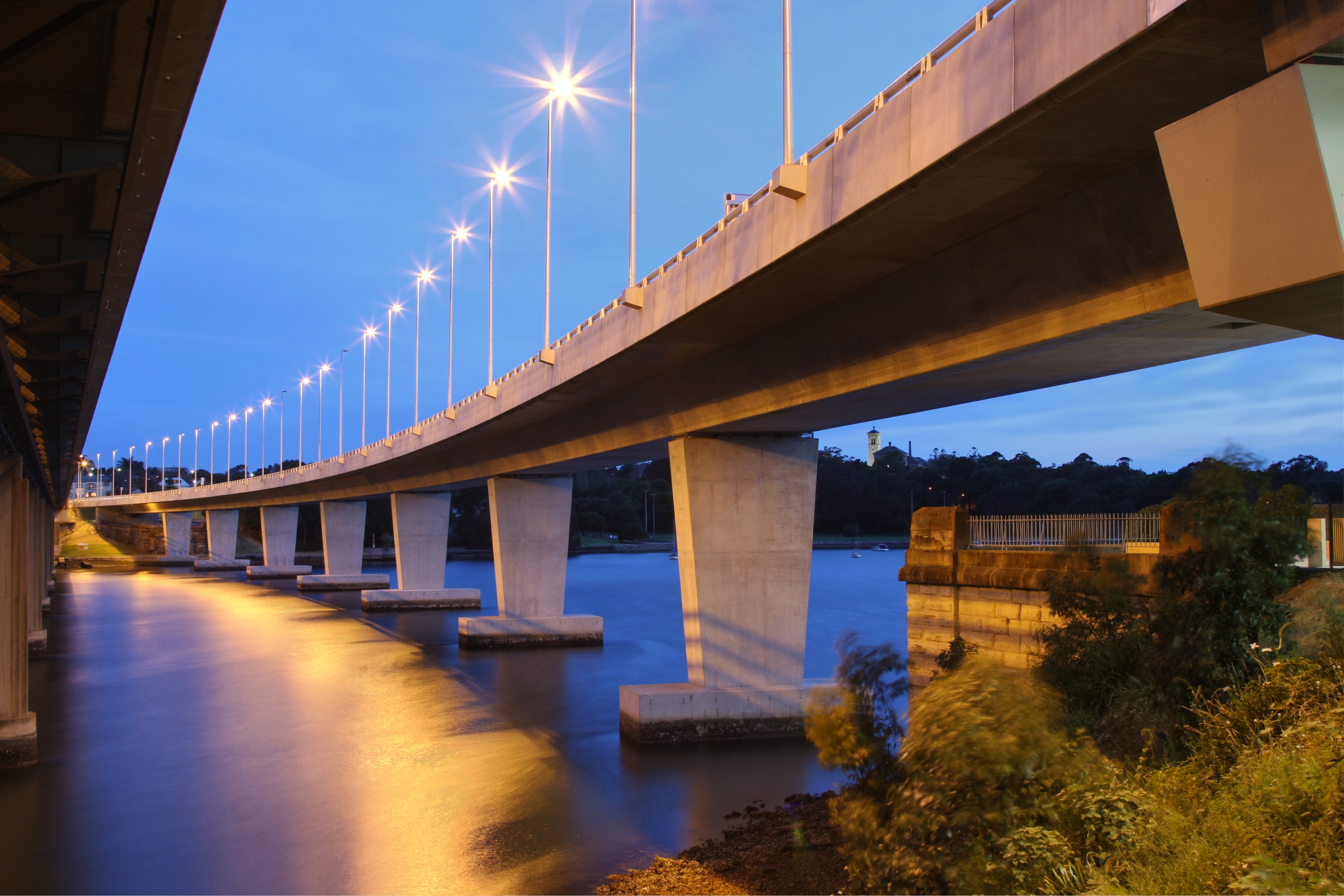
The Iron Cove Bridge connects Drummoyne and Rozelle

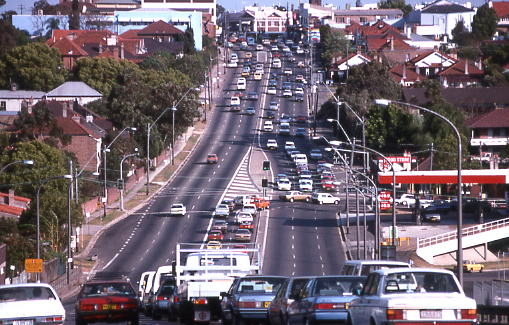
Citybound view from the Gladesville Bridge at Drummoyne in the early 1990s
