= Rozelle Interchange =

Motorway interchange in New South Wales, Australia

Coordinates: 33°52′13″S 151°10′20″E

Rozelle Interchange New South Wales
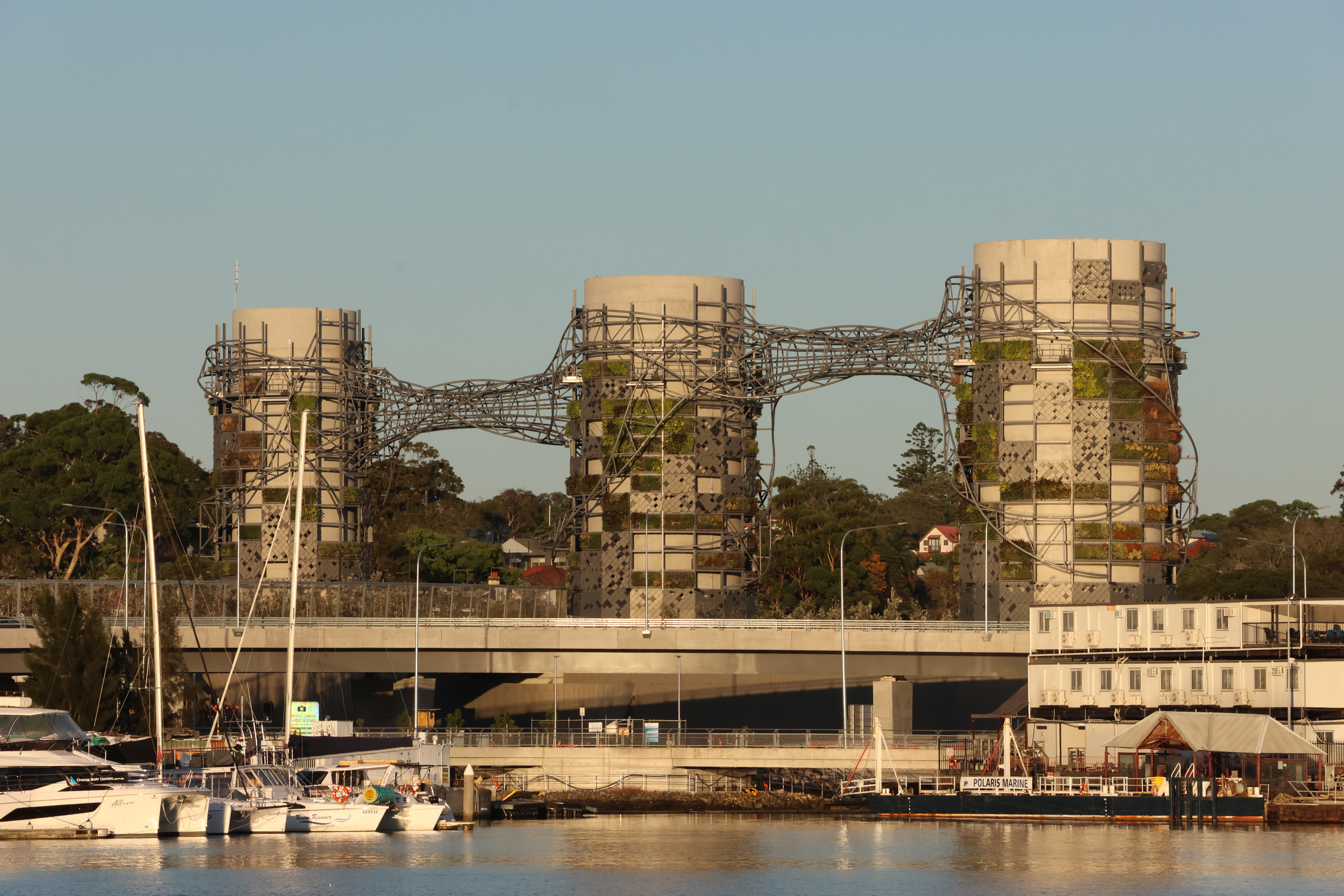
- Exhaust stacks for the tunnels with green walls

General information
- Type: Road junction
- Location: Rozelle; Lilyfield
- Opened: 26 November 2023
- Built by: John Holland CPB Contractors joint venture
- Maintained by: Transport for NSW
- Roads at junction: M4 Motorway; M8 Motorway; Victoria Road; Western Distributor; City West Link; Western Harbour Tunnel

Location(s)
- LGA(s): Inner West

The Rozelle Interchange is an underground motorway interchange in Sydney, New South Wales, Australia. It was built as part of WestConnex and opened to traffic on 26 November 2023. The interchange includes a toll-free bypass of Victoria Road between the Iron Cove Bridge and the Anzac Bridge known as the Iron Cove Link.

The interchange is located at the site of the former Rozelle Rail Yards. It is one of largest and most complex underground junctions in the world. It has three storeys of tunnels, with the deepest being 65 metres (213 ft) below ground.

The interchange will be the southern terminus of the under-construction Western Harbour Tunnel, which will be completed in 2028. Stub tunnels for the new tunnel were built during the construction of the interchange. On the surface above the underground interchange is a parkland known as Rozelle Parklands.

The interchange has been described as "Australia's most complex underground junction" and a spaghetti junction.

== Design ==
The interchange consists of two parallel sets of main tunnels, originating from the M4 (west-facing only) and the M8 (east-facing only) sections of the M4–M8 Link respectively, as well as the Iron Cove Link tunnels.

The tunnels originating from the M4 mainly lead into the Western Distributor and the Anzac Bridge, with entry and exit ramps connecting to the future Western Harbour Tunnel. There is no connection between Victoria Road (Iron Cove Bridge) and the M4 tunnels via the Iron Cove Link. Until the Western Harbour Tunnel opens, all eastbound traffic from the M4 tunnels lead to the Western Distributor and Anzac Bridge only, as there are no other exits.

The tunnels originating from the M8 mainly lead into the future Western Harbour Tunnel, with entry and exit ramps connecting to the Iron Cove Link, towards Iron Cove Bridge, and City West Link. Traffic from the M8 exits at City West Link, west of The Crescent intersection, to access the Western Distributor and the Anzac Bridge via City West Link, and vice versa.

The Iron Cove Link tunnels connect between the Western Distributor/Anzac Bridge and Victoria Road at Iron Cove Bridge. The Iron Cove Link is toll-free. It is the only component of WestConnex that is toll-free.

Future entrance and exit portals to the Western Harbour Tunnel have been built at the intersection of City West Link and The Crescent, which will become a four-way intersection when the Western Harbour Tunnel opens.

A 1961 report suggesting new freeways included an interchange near the current location of the Rozelle interchange. The location was also suggested in a 1977 report detailing alternatives to DMR freeways (alternative 4) (Note: And perhaps in May 1976)

Transport for NSW published the Rozelle Interchange and Western Harbour Tunnel Enabling Works Design and Construction Deed, dated 24 November 2023 (Note: Created 2024:03:11, according to the file metadata.), on 1 September 2026.

== Capacity ==
No provision has been made to increase the capacity on or after the Anzac Bridge to deal with extra traffic from the M8, M4 and Western Harbour Tunnel. In 2020, the NSW government forecast an increase in bridge traffic of less than one percent, so additional traffic from the new tolled tunnels must be offset by an induced reduction in traffic from the existing surface-road.

At the start of the project, in response to Local Council submissions raising the issue of local congestion and access, the NSW government promised that local congestion would be relieved:

"The approved project would improve the efficiency of existing infrastructure allowing for congestion to be relieved at key intersections on the existing road network. This includes improving on intersection performance on the congested section of the road network around the revised design at the City West Link/The Crescent and Victoria Road/The Crescent intersections."

— WestConnex M4-M5 Link Rozelle Interchange …Response to submissions…, June 2020

== Construction ==
The main contractor for the construction of the interchange and Iron Cove Link was a joint venture between John Holland and CPB Contractors. Unlike the other stages of WestConnex, construction was directly managed by Transport for NSW rather than WestConnex.

Construction began in 2020, with the halfway mark achieved in April 2021.

== Operation ==
The Rozelle West motorway operations complex is located on the western end of the Rozelle Parklands, and it comprises the majority of the operations facilities for the Rozelle Interchange, including maintenance and operations, substation, fire water pumps and deluge tanks, water treatment plants etc.

== Criticism ==
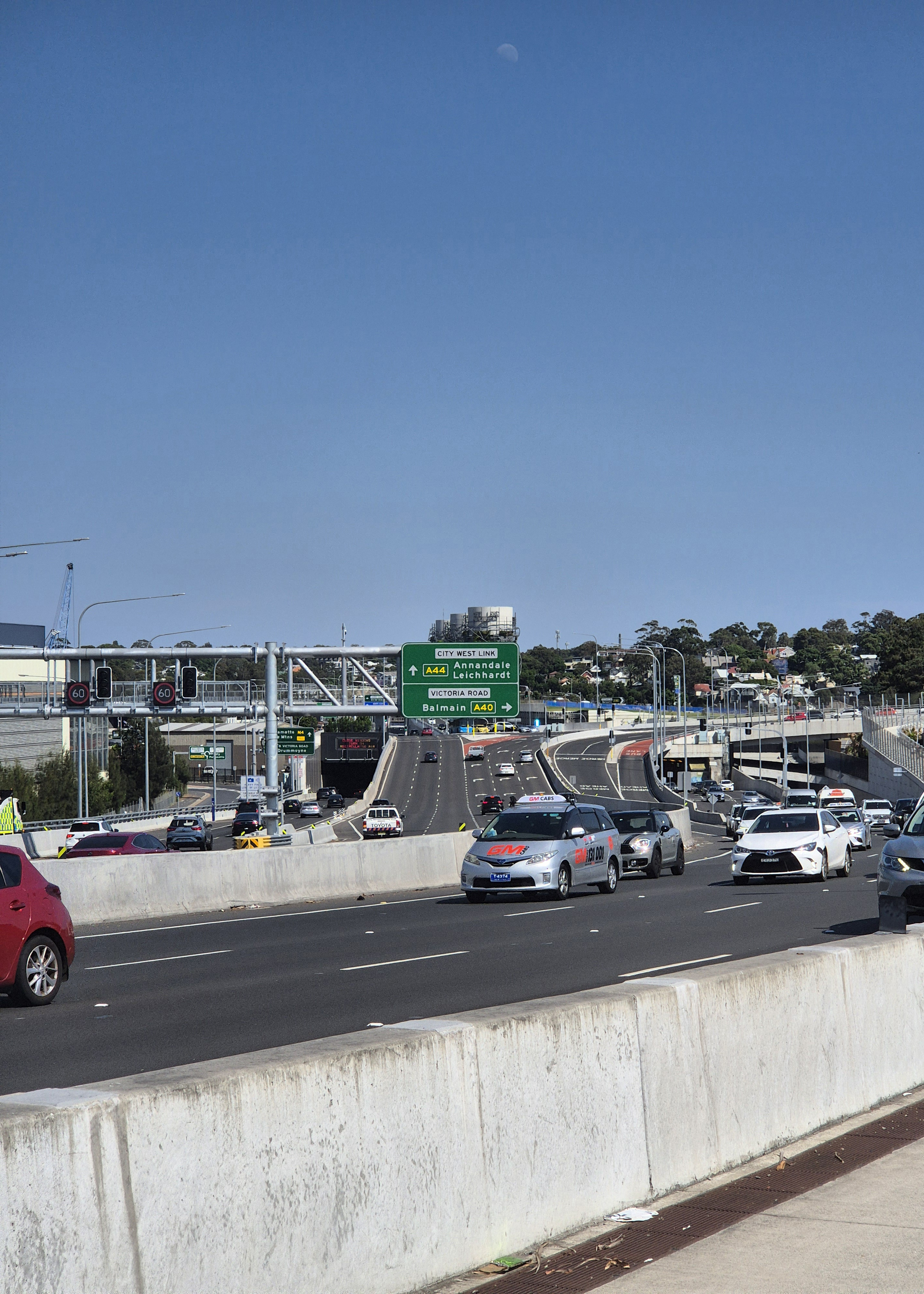
Rozelle Interchange from Anzac Bridge shared path

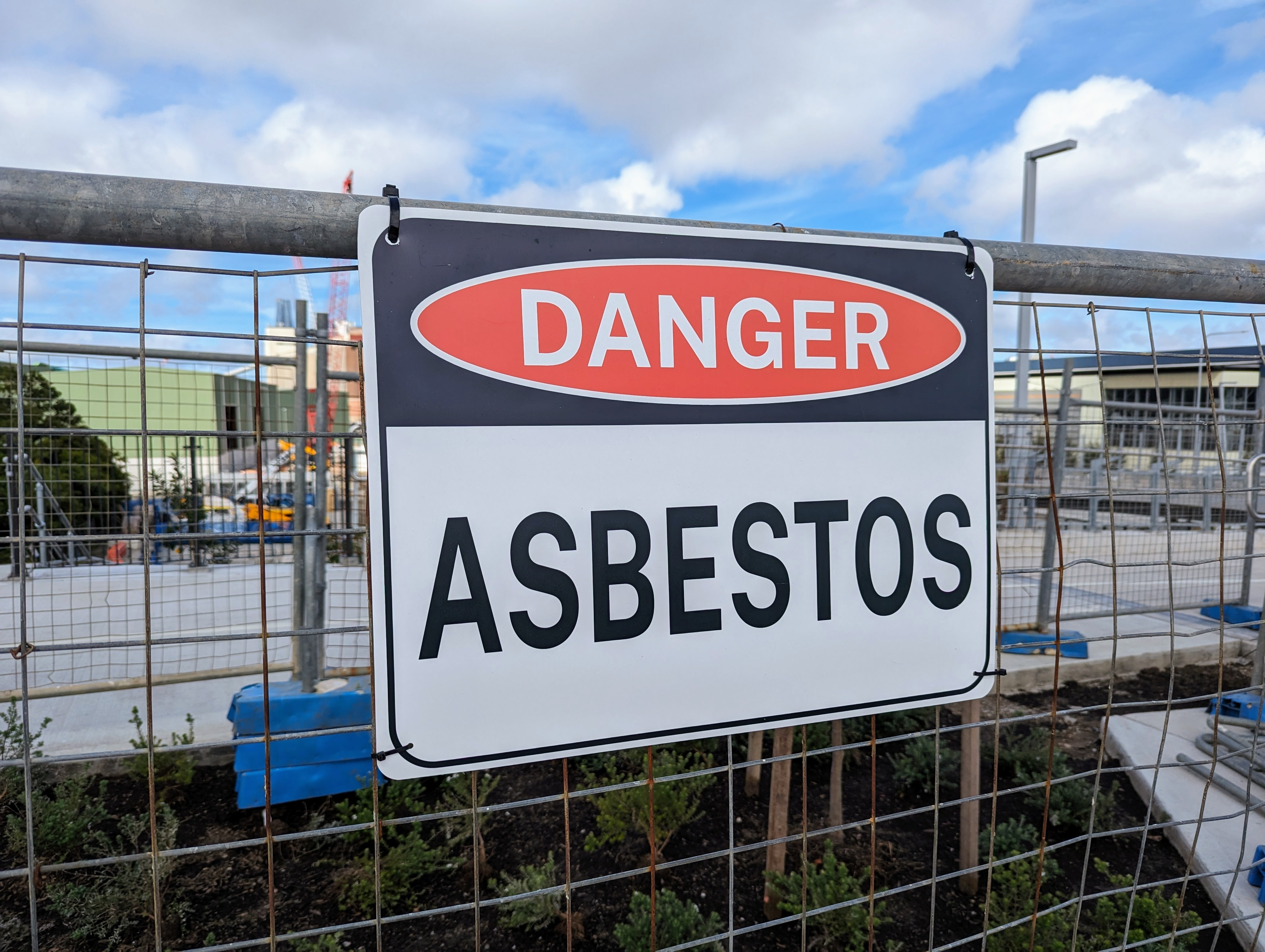
A warning sign for asbestos in Rozelle Parklands

After opening to the public on 26 November 2023, the new arrangement caused severe congestion and delays during the morning and evening peaks, with extensive delays on non-tolled surface roads for both vehicles and public transport.

The removal of lanes to the Anzac Bridge from the City West Link and Victoria Road has been criticised. Priority of traffic consisting of two lanes is given to the toll roads, whereas the other lanes are merged coming from Victoria Road and the Iron Cove Link Tunnel, supporting the maximum 4 lanes over the Anzac Bridge. This essentially affected all prior road users before the Interchange was opened.

The Iron Cove Link was criticised as being underused due to misleading signage at both the Iron Cove Bridge and Anzac Bridge, that misled vehicles that the Iron Cove Link was tolled, which was not the case. Issues with ambiguous, wrong, incomplete and too-late signage were reported.

Minister for Roads John Graham has proposed reducing truck movements during peak periods, and alterations to existing signage to the interchange.

After samples of asbestos were found in recycled mulch in the Rozelle Parklands, the site was temporarily closed to the public. Initial testing found no airborne particles which are dangerous to human health, but investigation into the mulch supplier found asbestos at dozens of other sites across Sydney, triggering the Sydney asbestos mulch crisis.

== Rozelle Parklands ==
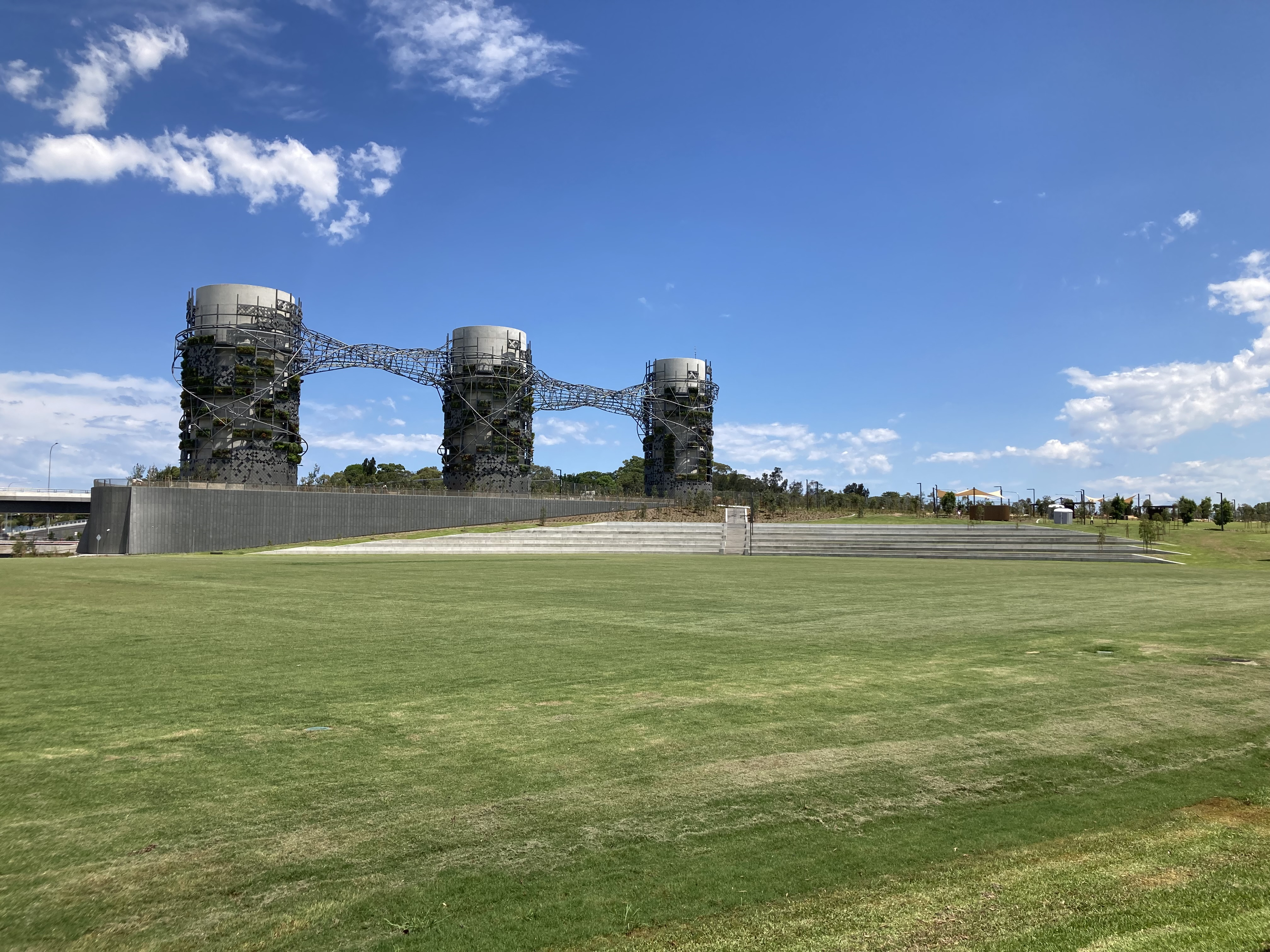
Rozelle Parklands and the tunnel stacks in the background

Above the tunnels, at the location of the former rail yards, is a 10-hectare (25-acre) open green space known as the Rozelle Parklands. It has a wetlands, a village green, playing and barbecue facilities, and active transport links. A shared user path bridge over City West Link connects the parkland to the Rozelle Bay light rail stop and the southern side of The Crescent. The Rozelle Parklands opened to the public on 17 December 2023, three weeks after the interchange opened. The park was closed on 10 January 2024, less than a month after opening, due to the discovery of asbestos-contaminated mulch. It was reopened on 28 March 2024.

The Rozelle Parklands was proposed as part of the urban design and landscape plan for the Rozelle Interchange project. The plan was released for community consultation in August and September 2020. During the community consultation, more than 1,600 individual comments and 723 official submissions of feedback were received. In response, Transport for NSW established the Rozelle Parklands Working Group (RPWG), which included local community member and representatives from the Department of Planning, Industry and Environment (DPIE), Office of Sport, Inner West Council and Transport for NSW.

The RPWG was responsible for managing the consultation and making recommendations to Transport for NSW. In May 2021, their final recommendations report was presented to the Minister for Transport and Roads, and the urban design and landscape plan was approved by the DPIE.
