= Bradfield Highway (Sydney) =

Highway in Sydney, New South Wales, Australia

Bradfield Highway New South Wales
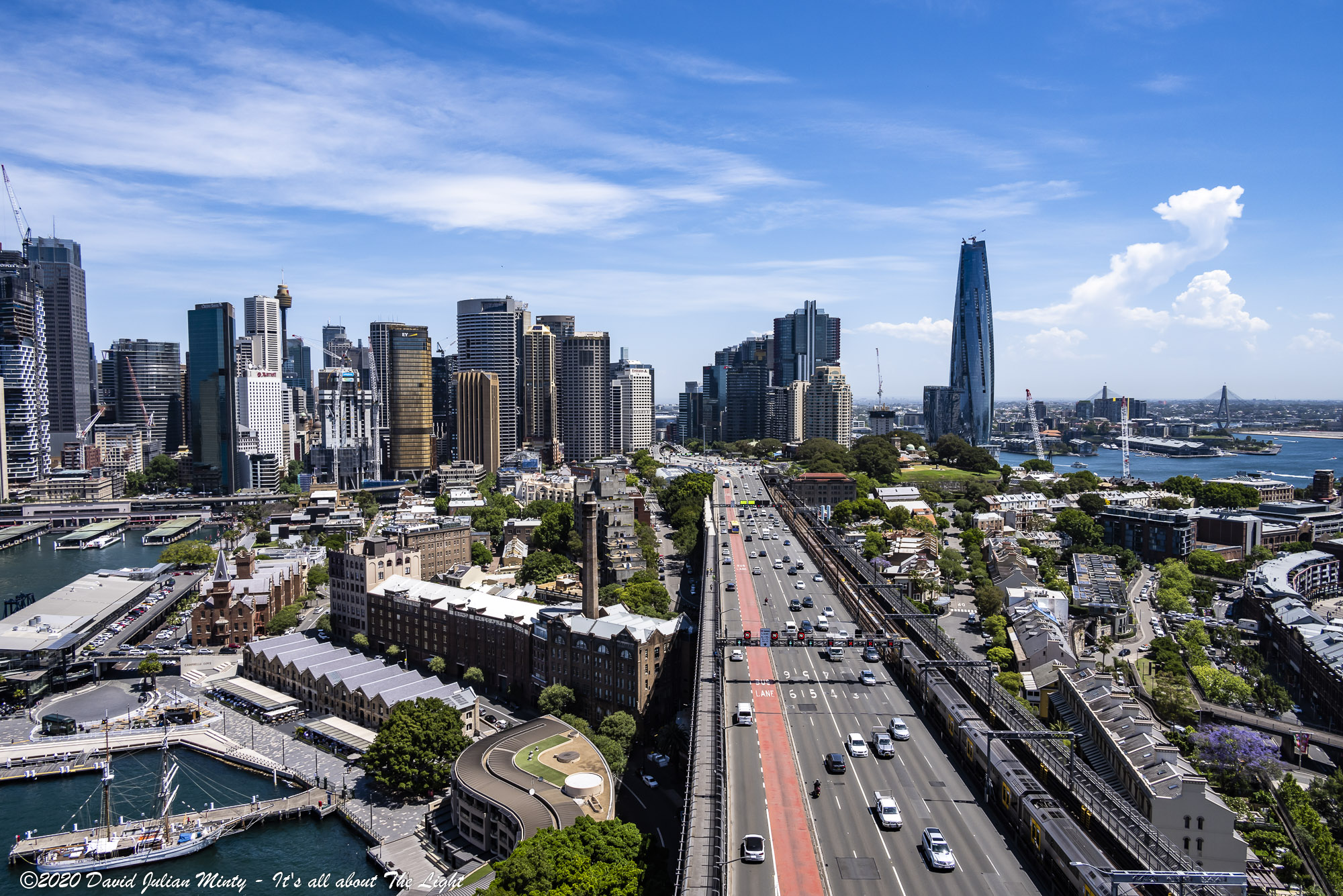
- Bradfield Highway, south-westerly aspect
- Coordinates: 33.843764°S 151.211460°E (North end); 33.860645°S 151.205774°E (South end)

General information
- Type: Highway
- Length: 2.1 km (1.3 mi)
- Opened: 19 March 1932
- Gazetted: January 1993
- Maintained by: Transport for NSW
- Former route number: Metroad 2 (1993–2007); State Route 28 (1992–1993); National Route 1 (1955–1992)

Major junctions
- North end: Warringah Freeway; North Sydney
- Cahill Expressway
- South end: Western Distributor; Millers Point, Sydney

Highway system
- Highways in Australia; National Highway • Freeways in Australia; Highways in New South Wales

Bradfield Highway is a 2.1-kilometre (1.3 mi) highway that crosses the Sydney Harbour Bridge in Sydney, New South Wales and is one of the shortest highways in Australia. It opened along with the bridge itself on 19 March 1932 and was named in honour of John Bradfield, the engineer who designed and helped construct it.

== Route ==
Bradfield Highway commences at the interchange with Warringah Freeway and Lavender Street in North Sydney and heads in a southerly direction as an eight-lane multi-carriageway road, crossing Port Jackson over the Sydney Harbour Bridge, before shortly terminating at the interchange with Western Distributor and Cahill Expressway, at the former southern toll plaza at the southern foot of the bridge, at Millers Point.

Bradfield Highway currently carries eight lanes of traffic over Sydney Harbour Bridge, each numbered from one to eight from west to east, but with the two easternmost lanes (lanes 7 and 8) permanently assigned in a southbound direction: lane 7 as a 24hr bus lane, and lane 8 as access solely to the off-ramp to Cahill Expressway. During peak periods three out of the six remaining lanes are reversed, giving a 2 × 4, 3 × 3 or 5 × 1 flow. The default is 4 × 2, being four north lanes and two south lanes (with the remaining two permanent southbound lanes providing an even flow of traffic). The direction of the lanes is indicated by electronic signage above each lane. Lane six was also reversed prior to 1990 during the evening rush hour, giving a 6 × 0 flow, however this no longer occurs because of changes made to Warringah Freeway to accommodate the Sydney Harbour Tunnel.

In 2001, 159,587 vehicles a day used the highway.

Bradfield Highway is still designated as a stock route, and livestock can still be herded across the Sydney Harbour Bridge if properly arranged by a grazier.

== History ==
As a government-appointed civil engineer, John Bradfield oversaw the tendering process for the construction of the Sydney Harbour Bridge, and as the NSW Public Works Department chief engineer had oversight of the bridge design and construction. Amid some controversy, Bradfield was also considered to be the co-designer of the bridge's arch design, along with Dorman Long and Sir Ralph Freeman. When the bridge on 19 March 1932, the Governor of New South Wales Sir Philip Game named the highway after him.

Prior to the construction of Warringah Freeway in 1968, all traffic at the northern terminus of Bradfield Highway was directed to or from the Pacific Highway via North Sydney. In August 1992 the Sydney Harbour Tunnel opened which helped to relieve congestion on Bradfield Highway.

The passing of the Main Roads Act of 1924 through the Parliament of New South Wales provided for the declaration of Main Roads, roads partially funded by the State government through the Main Roads Board. With the subsequent passing of the Main Roads (Amendment) Act of 1929 to provide for additional declarations of State Highways and Trunk Roads, the Department of Main Roads (having succeeded the MRB in 1932) declared Main Road 632 along Bradfield Highway, from the interchange with Lavender Street in North Sydney to the former southern toll plaza in Millers Point, on 22 January 1993. Despite its role as a grade-separated motorway, the road is not officially gazetted as one by Transport for NSW classification, and is still considered today to be a main road.

The passing of the Roads Act of 1993 updated road classifications and the way they could be declared within New South Wales. Under this act, Bradfield Highway retains its declaration as Main Road 632, and is specifically stated within the Roads Act 1993 to be a Main Road.

Bradfield Highway was signed National Route 1 in 1955, until the Sydney Harbour Tunnel opened and it was re-aligned along it in 1992. State Route 28 was extended from its previous terminus, at Longueville Road and Pacific Highway in Lane Cove, along Gore Hill Freeway, Warringah Freeway and Bradfield Highway when Gore Hill Freeway opened in 1992, but this was replaced by Metroad 2 a year later in 1993. It was removed when the Lane Cove Tunnel opened in 2007.

== Tolls ==
A road toll is levied on all vehicles travelling across the Sydney Harbour Bridge in a southerly direction only; one also applies for vehicles travelling in the same direction using the Sydney Harbour Tunnel. In November 2014, Roads & Maritime Services proposed an upgrade to the tolling infrastructure which included the construction new tolling gantries at four locations on the northern approaches to the bridge, covering Bradfield Highway (including the dedicated lane to reach Cahill Expressway) and the Sydney Harbour Tunnel, and the removal of existing tolling gantries at both the northern and southern bridge termini.

Toll prices as of 1 July 2025
Toll road	Class A toll prices (Note: Class A vehicles are typically cars and motorcycles; Class B vehicles are all other vehicles including trucks and heavy vehicles.)	Class B toll prices	Toll increase	Toll concessionaire	Expiry of toll concession
Sydney Harbour Bridge (southbound only)	$4.41 (max., varies by time of day)	Same as Class A prices	No regular toll increase	NSW Motorways (Note: The Sydney Harbour Bridge is owned by the government and has no toll concessions.)	–

== Exits and interchanges ==
LGA	Location	km	mi	Destinations	Notes
North Sydney	North Sydney–Milsons Point boundary	0.0	0.0	Warringah Freeway - North Sydney, Lane Cove, Hornsby, Newcastle	Northern terminus of highway, continues north as Warringah Freeway
North Sydney	North Sydney–Milsons Point boundary	0.0	0.0	Lavender Street - Milsons Point, McMahons Point	Northbound exit only
Port Jackson		0.6– 1.8	0.37– 1.1	Sydney Harbour Bridge (Toll on southbound traffic only, no toll northbound)	
Sydney	Millers Point	2.1	1.3	Cahill Expressway - Woolloomooloo, Heathcote, Wollongong, Sydney Airport	Northbound exit and southbound entrance only
Sydney	Millers Point	2.1	1.3	Western Distributor (A4) - Haymarket, Ashfield, Parramatta	Southern terminus of highway, route A4 continues south along Western Distributor
1.000 mi = 1.609 km; 1.000 km = 0.621 mi: Incomplete access; Tolled; Route transition
