= The Bay Run =

Shared-use path in Iron Cove, Sydney

Coordinates: 33°51′49″S 151°09′13″E

- Length: 7 kilometres (4.3 mi)
- Location: Sydney, New South Wales, Australia
- Trailheads: Circuit from the mouth of Iron Cove Creek at Timbrell Drive, Five Dock to Rozelle, Lilyfield, Haberfield, Rodd Point, Russell Lea & Drummoyne
- Use: Cycling and pedestrians
- Difficulty: Easy
- Season: All seasons

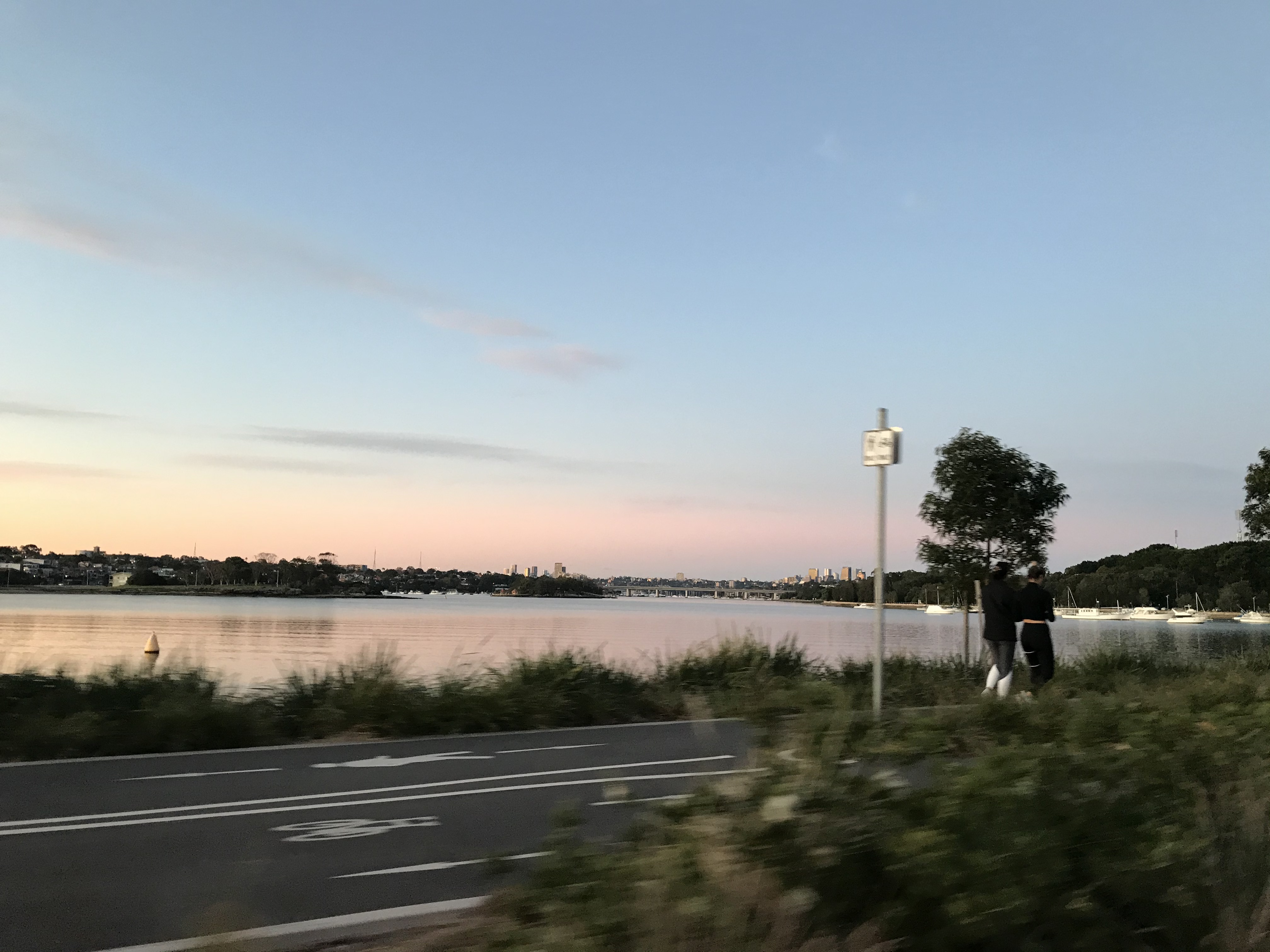
The Bay Run, Haberfield

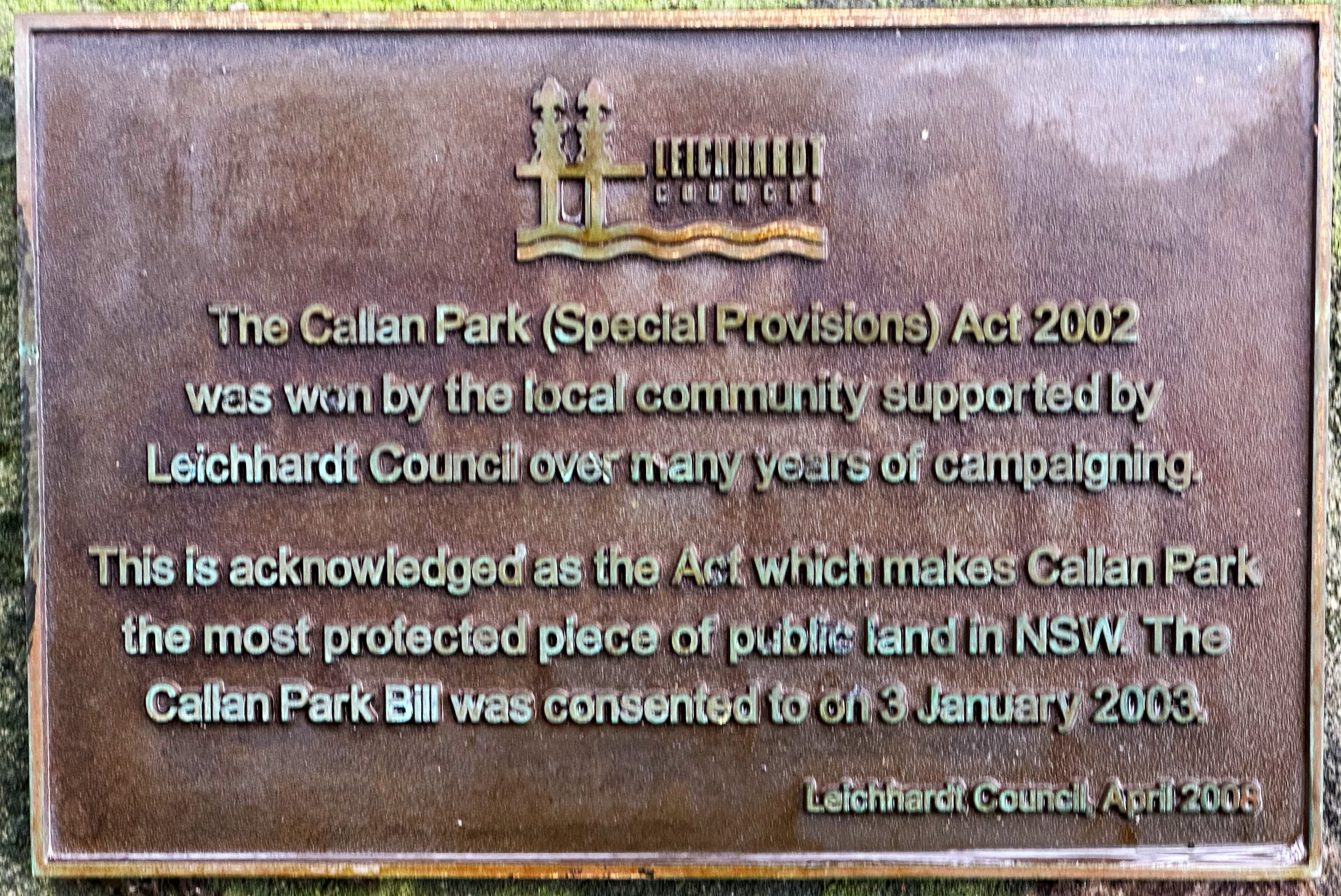
Callan Park is protected by an Act of Parliament

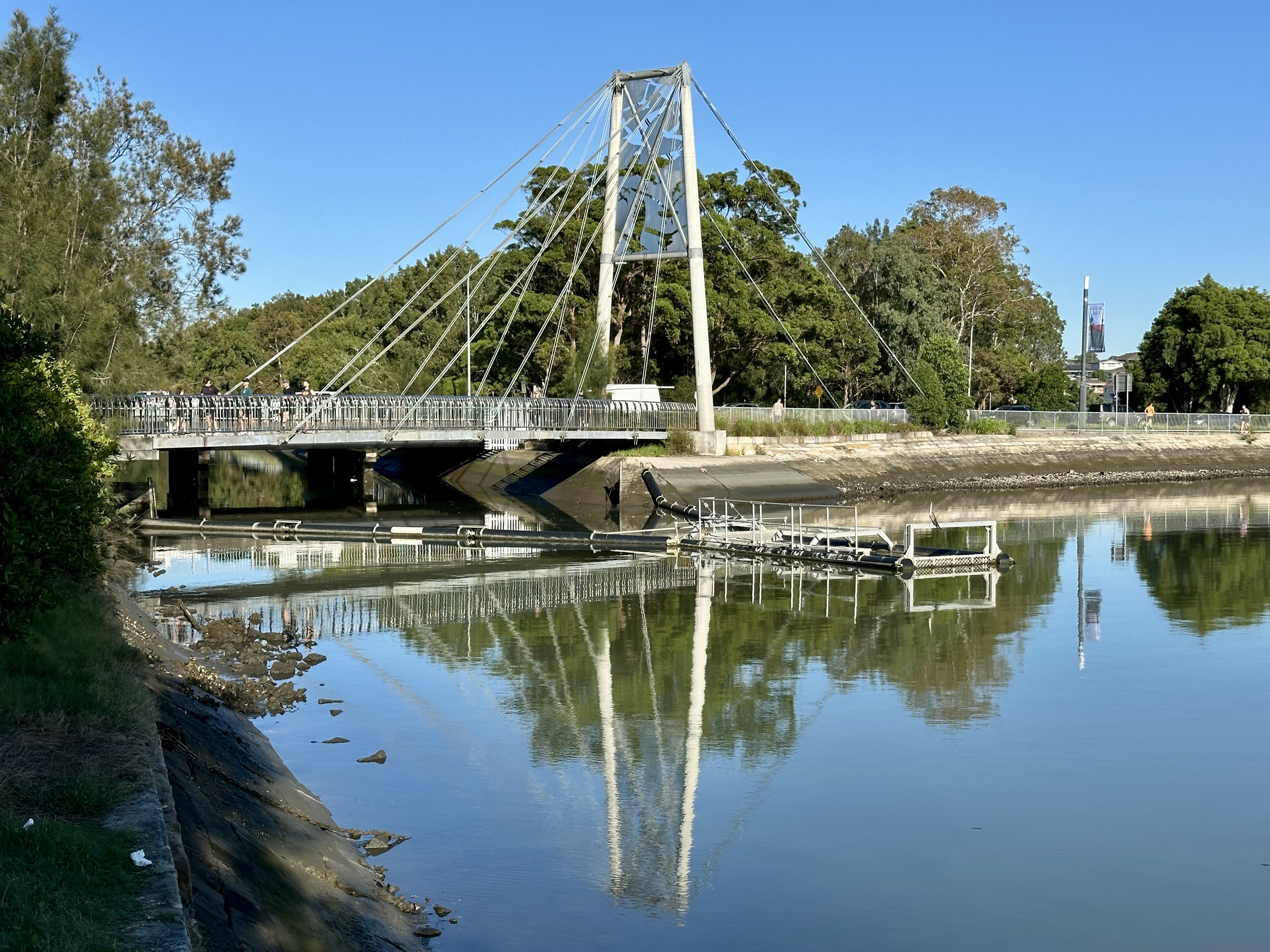
The Iron Cove Creek Bridge with its motifs of local birds

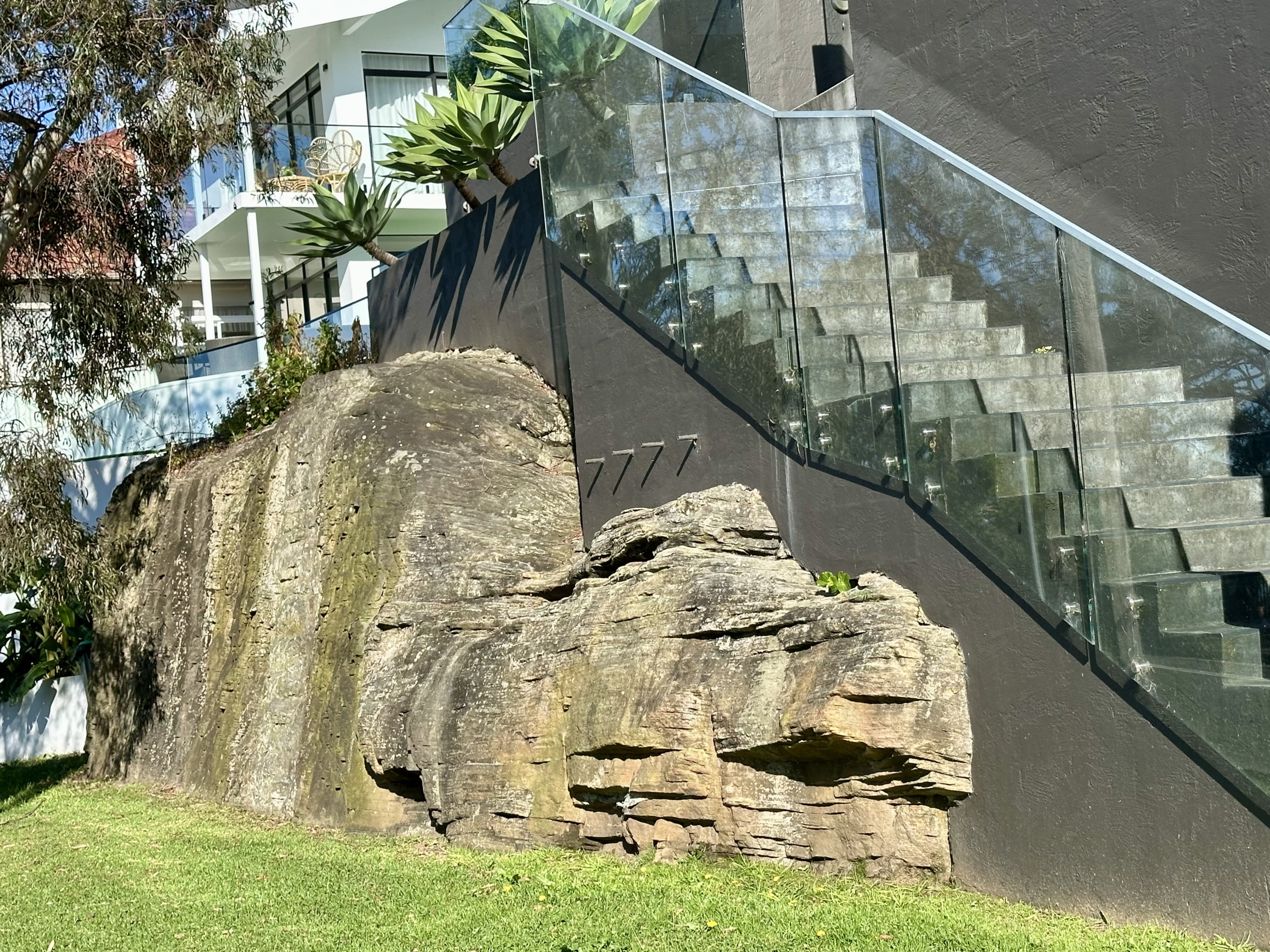
Casa de Reptile - with rock protrusion Luis Barragan style

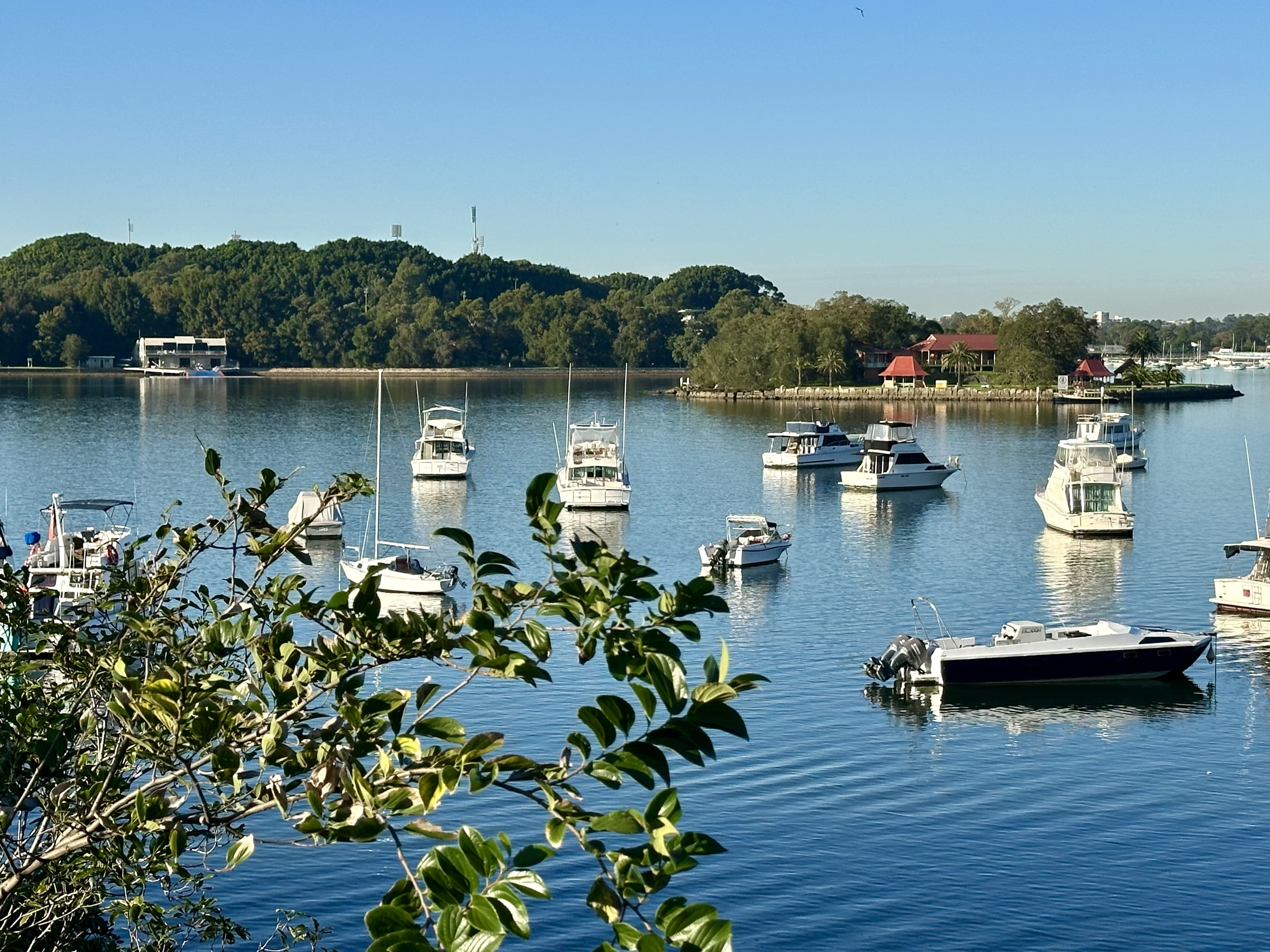
Rodd Island, Iron Cove, view from Thompson's Wharf

The Bay Run is a 7-kilometre-long pedestrian and cycling circuit around Iron Cove passing through the suburbs of Rozelle, Lilyfield, Haberfield, Five Dock, Rodd Point. Russell Lea and Drummoyne. in the Inner West of Sydney, New South Wales, Australia. The Bay Run provides excellent views of Iron Cove for its entire course as it constantly hugs the shoreline. The Bay Run is popular with joggers, walkers, roller skaters and cyclists who enjoy the pleasant waterside scenery while exercising. The Bay Run plays host to the annual Bay Run fun run, a community event that brings people together in the name of health, fun and exercise.

The Bay Run has separate pathways for cyclists and pedestrians, and those on foot should not encroach on the dedicated cycleway.

== Route ==
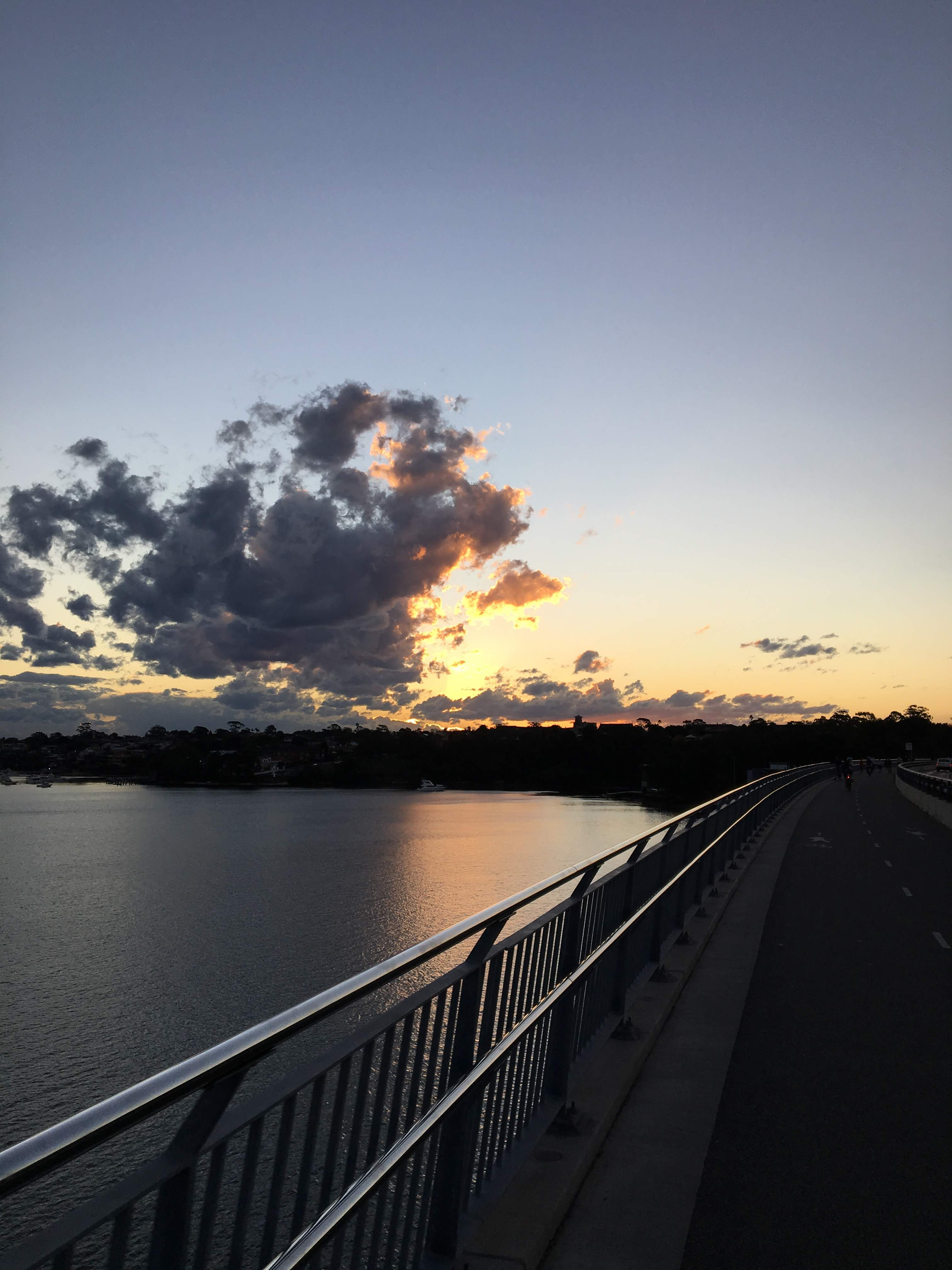
Sunset on Iron Cove

A popular place to start the Bay Run is where the Iron Cove Bridge meets the Drummoyne Olympic Pool. The popular route is anticlockwise, which means that Iron Cove is always on the left. There is a dual path along almost the whole of the route, the pedestrian path is closer to the water.

From the Drummoyne Olympic Pool to Rodd Point, the path follows the shore of Sisters Bay past the Drummoyne Rowing Club to Thompson's Wharf where a fine view is available of Iron Cove. The path follows Henley Marine Drive until a fine view of Rodd Island is available at a private wharf. A little further along is a local landmark of a crocodile of natural sandstone, in the style of Luis Barragan. At Rodd Point, is Rodd Park where the Dobroyd Aquatic Club (a sailing club) is situated.

From Rodd Point to Hawthorne Canal there are large stands of Grey Mangrove. There are informative signs which provide insights into the local indigenous culture, history and ecology of the area erected by the Canada Bay Council. Past Timbrell Park is the Iron Cove Creek Bridge at the mouth of Iron Creek. Its spectacular motifs of local bird life reflect the pelicans, kingfishers and cormorants which perch on the floating boom barrier. Admire the view of the Iron Cove Bridge at the other end of the cove. The path runs alongside the City West Link Road and passes the UTS Haberfield Rowing Club. The road traffic crosses Hawthorne Canal on a new bridge, with the old bridge a footbridge dedicated to the Bay Run. At this point there is an option to follow a picturesque path which loops under both bridges and crosses Hawthorne Canal at Blackmore Oval. Admire the Bicycle Tree sculpture.

From Hawthorne Canal to King George Park Rozelle, the path runs through parkland. Signs tell of the Italian Fishermen and the former APIA Club, now the Le Montage venue. Up the hill is Leichhardt Oval and the Leichhardt Aquatic Centre. The path passes the Giovinazzo Grove, dedicated to the Sister City relationship between Giovinazzo, Italy, and Inner West Council. The Leichhardt Rowing Club is next, and then the path runs beside a recreation area and sporting ground for cricket and football. Up a small incline is the Summerhouse at Callan Point and a remnant grove of Ironbark trees, from which Iron Cove derives its name. The path leads to King George Park, which is a venue for athletics in the summer and soccer (football) in the winter. There is a new children's playground.

From King George Park across the Iron Cove Bridge to the Olympic Swimming Pool. The path leads up to the Rozelle end of the Iron Cove Bridge. Admire the sandstone tower of the Callan Park buildings. There are two options to cross Iron Cove. The new Iron Cove Bridge, which provides a panoramic view of Iron Cove, or the old Iron Cove Bridge, which provides a panoramic view of Sydney Harbour, particularly Birkenhead Point and Cockatoo Island.

It takes abour 1.5 hours to walk the Bay Run. There are water fountains and seats at regular intervals along the path.

== See also ==
- Bike paths in Sydney
- Cycling in New South Wales
- Cycling in Sydney
