= Iron Cove =

Bay on the Parramatta River in Australia

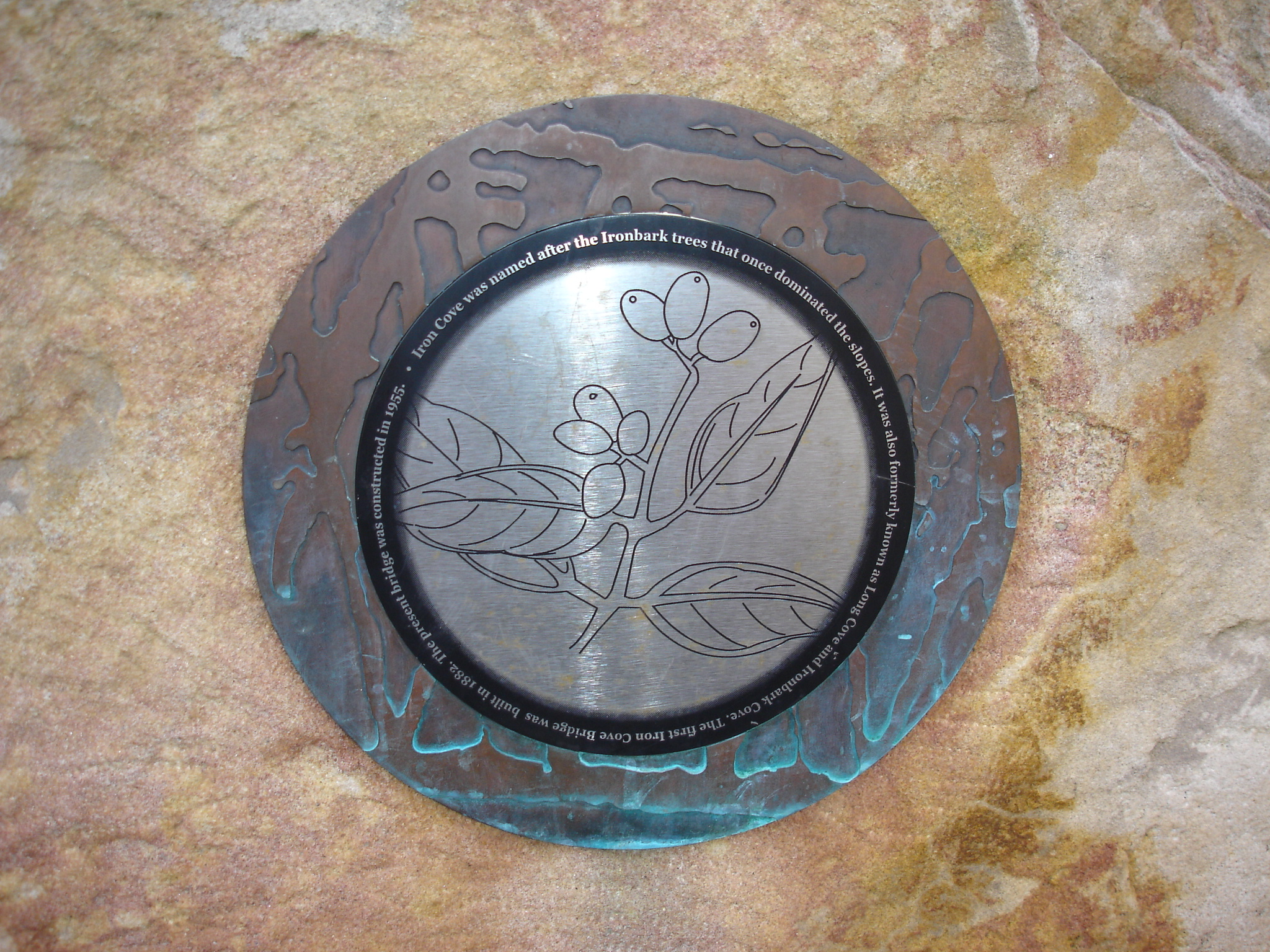
- Iron Cove information plate

- Location in Sydney
- Coordinates: 33°51′45″S 151°09′17″E
- Type: Estuarine bay
- Part of: Port Jackson
- Primary inflows: Hawthorne Canal; Iron Cove Creek
- Primary outflows: Parramatta River
- Catchment area: Sydney Basin
- Basin countries: Australia
- Frozen: never
- Islands: Rodd Island
- Settlements: Sydney

Iron Cove is a bay on the Parramatta River, in the inner-west of Sydney, in the state of New South Wales, Australia. It is approximately 5 kilometres (3.1 mi) due west of Sydney's central business district. It is surrounded by the suburbs of Birchgrove, Balmain, Rozelle, Lilyfield, Haberfield, Five Dock, Rodd Point, Russell Lea and Drummoyne. The bay extends from Longnose Point to the south-west and is fed by the Hawthorne Canal and the Iron Cove Creek.

== History ==
William Dawes recorded the name of this place as Go-mo-ra in the language of the local people.

In the early days of the colony of New South Wales, the area was sometimes known as Long Cove, presumably for its long narrow shape. The origin of the name 'Iron Cove' is unclear. On the 1822 survey map of Port Jackson (Sydney Harbour) by John Septimus Roe, Lieut. R.N. it is noted as Iron-stone Cove. Iron Cove appears to be a shortening of this name that perhaps referred to the reddy coloured iron oxides in the stone, known as laterites. In his book on Sydney Harbour, P.R. Stephensen suggests that the name is derived from the iron shackles worn by convicts from Cockatoo Island who were forced to work in the area around the bay from 1839. However, he goes on to note that this is merely "a surmise". Another possible explanation for the name is that it was derived from the ironbark trees that used to grow there.

The island in the middle of the bay is called Rodd Island, in honour of Brent Clements Rodd. Iron Cove is crossed by the Iron Cove Bridge, which was first opened in 1882 and links Rozelle and Balmain to Drummoyne. The original bridge was replaced in the 1950s. The Australian warships HMAS Ballarat and HMAS Goulburn were broken up for scrap in the bay in 1953.

There are a number of smaller bays with Iron Cove, such as Sisters Bay and Half Moon Bay on the northern shores. The concrete channelised Iron Cove Creek runs into the western end of the bay, and Hawthorne Canal runs off the southern part of the bay.

The land around the bay is mostly made up of publicly accessible foreshore or parkland. This forms a 7 kilometres (4.3 mi) jogging circuit known as The Bay Run.

== Pollution ==
According to the University of Sydney's School of Geosciences, this bay and its catchment area are the most heavily polluted in Sydney Harbour. In particular, very high levels of copper, zinc, and lead have been detected in the bay. Some of this pollution is contained in road dust, which is washed into the bay in stormwater. Iron Cove Creek (Dobroyd Canal) also suffers from organic and hydrocarbon pollutants.

A proposal has been put forward for a water filtration device to be installed at Iron Cove Creek. According to Professor Gavin Birch from the University of Sydney's School of Geosciences, "This device is specifically designed to stop those contaminants [heavy metals, organic pollutants and hydrocarbons] actually reaching Sydney Harbour."

== Gallery ==
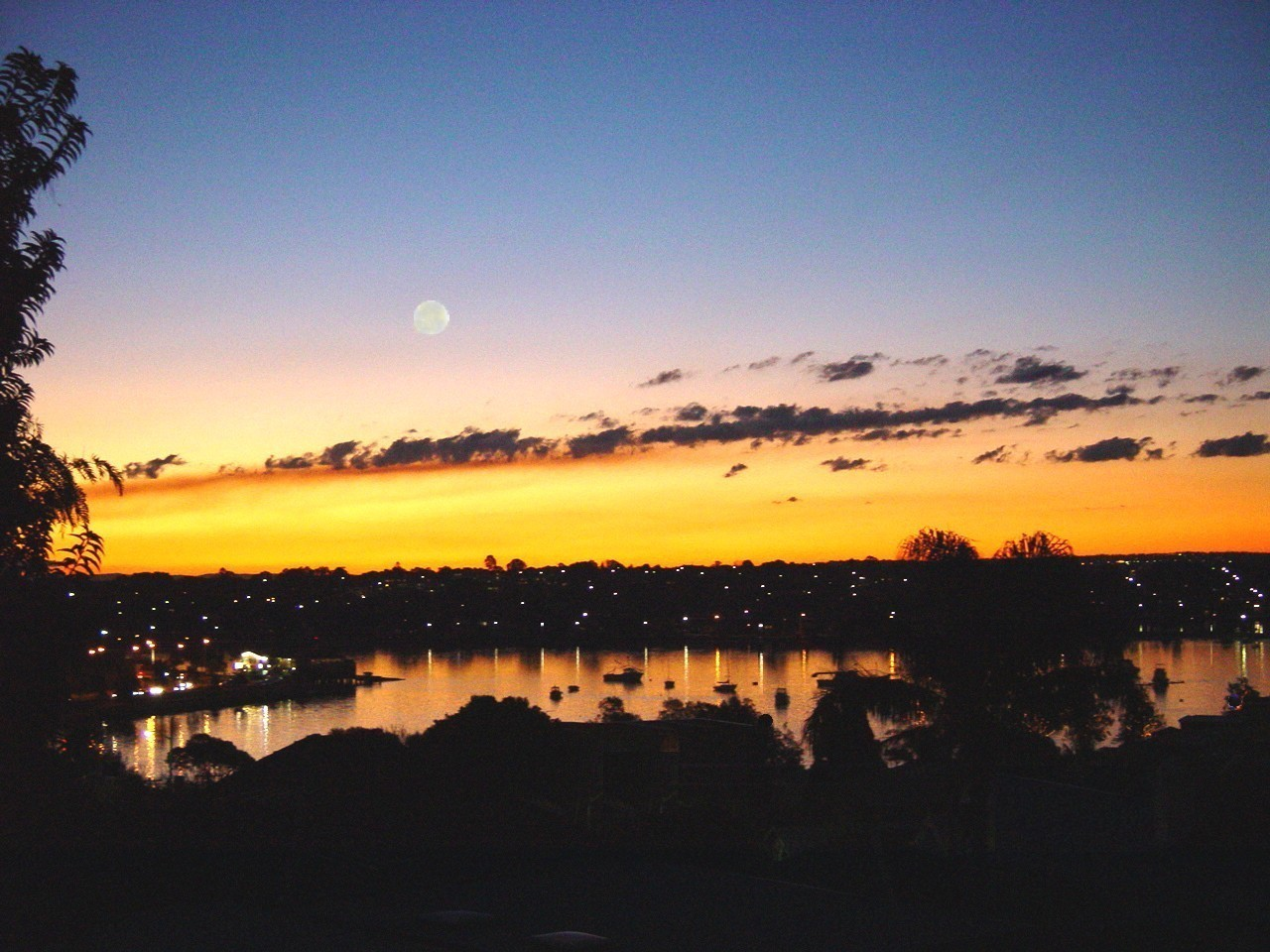
Dobroyd Point, Iron Cove from Francis Street, Lilyfield

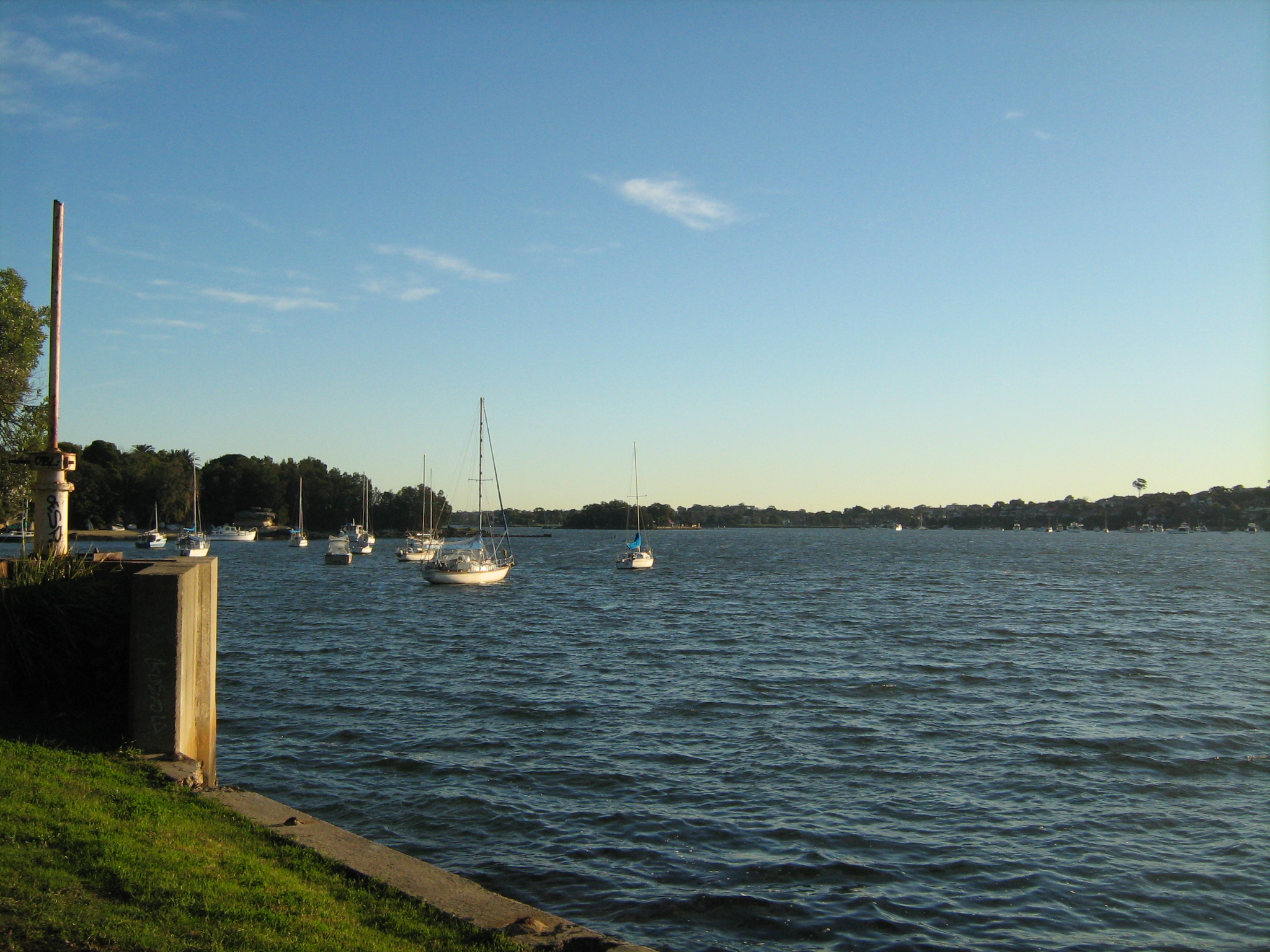
View of Iron Cove from King George Park, Rozelle

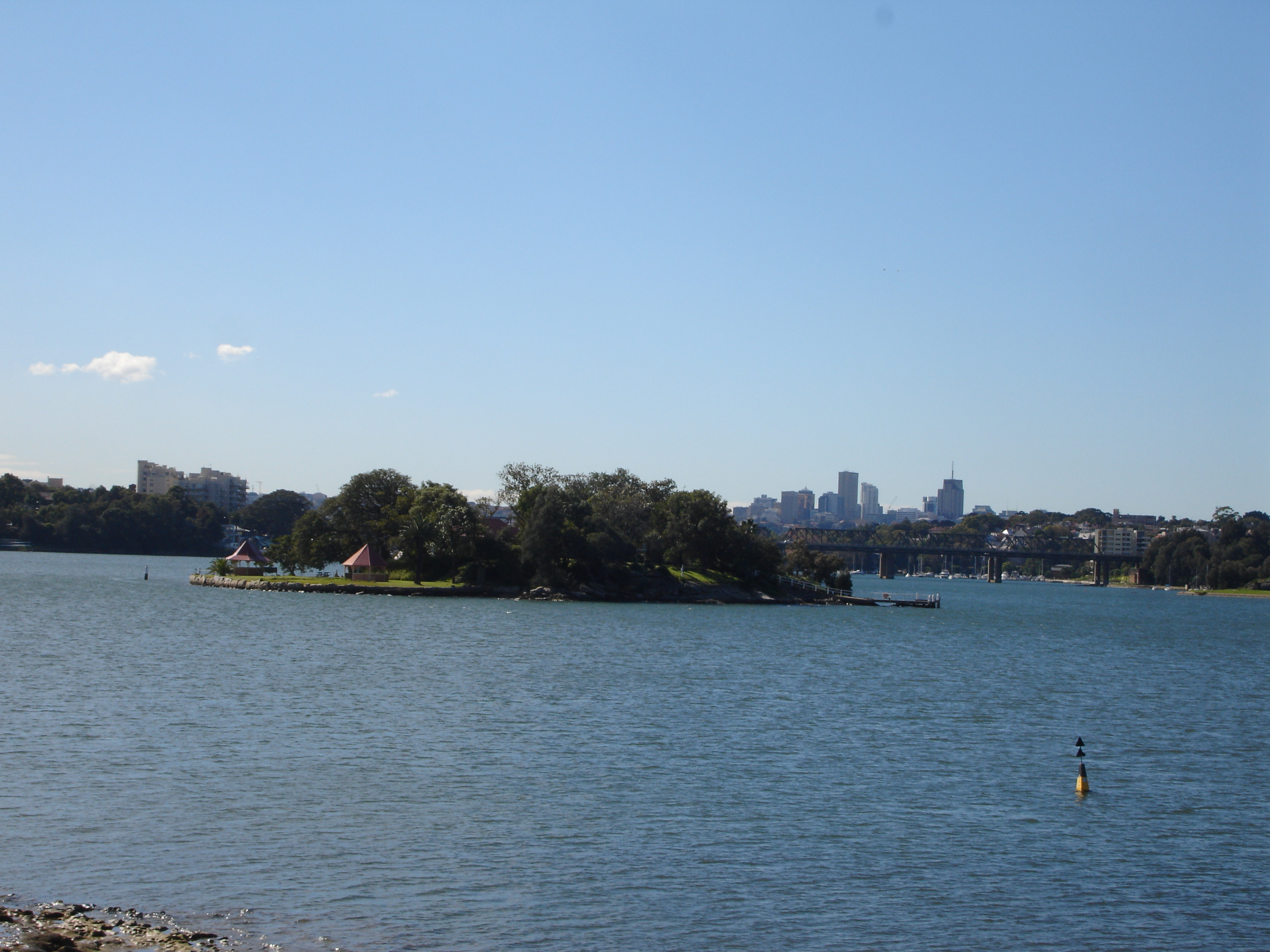
Rodd Island looking north from Rodd Point

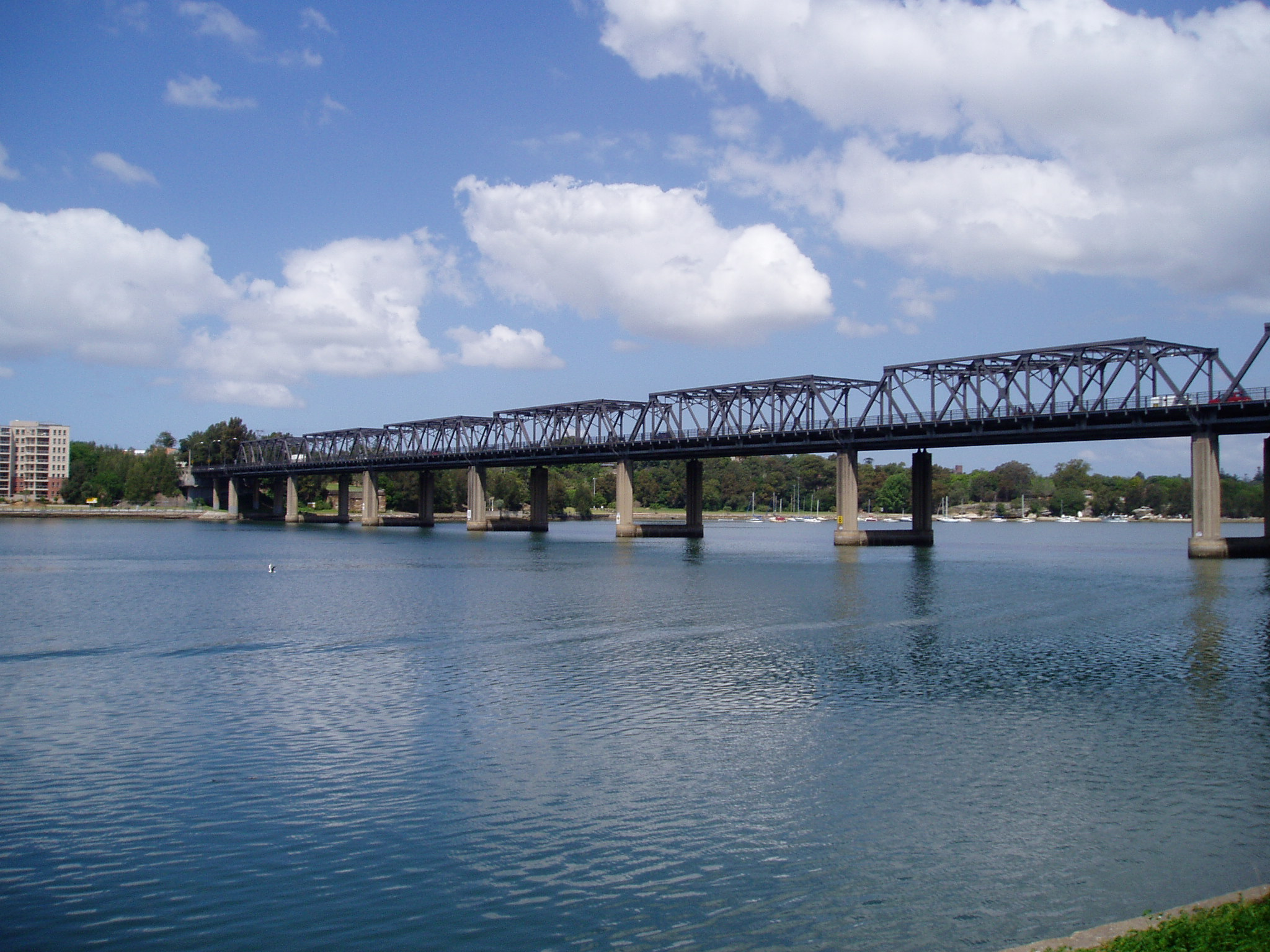
Iron Cove Bridge with Lilyfield in background, taken from Birkenhead Point

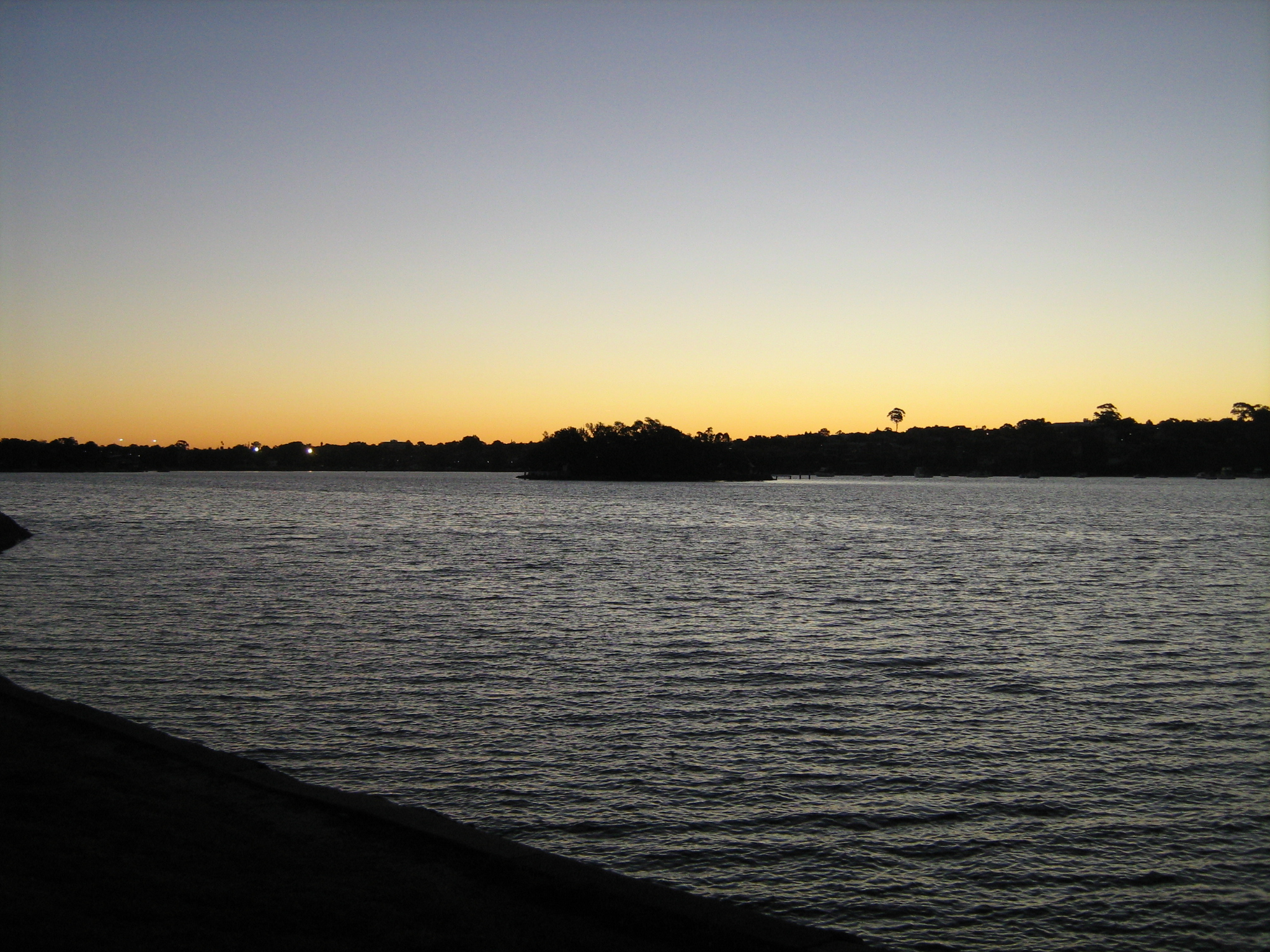
Looking over Iron Cove from Callan Park at dusk

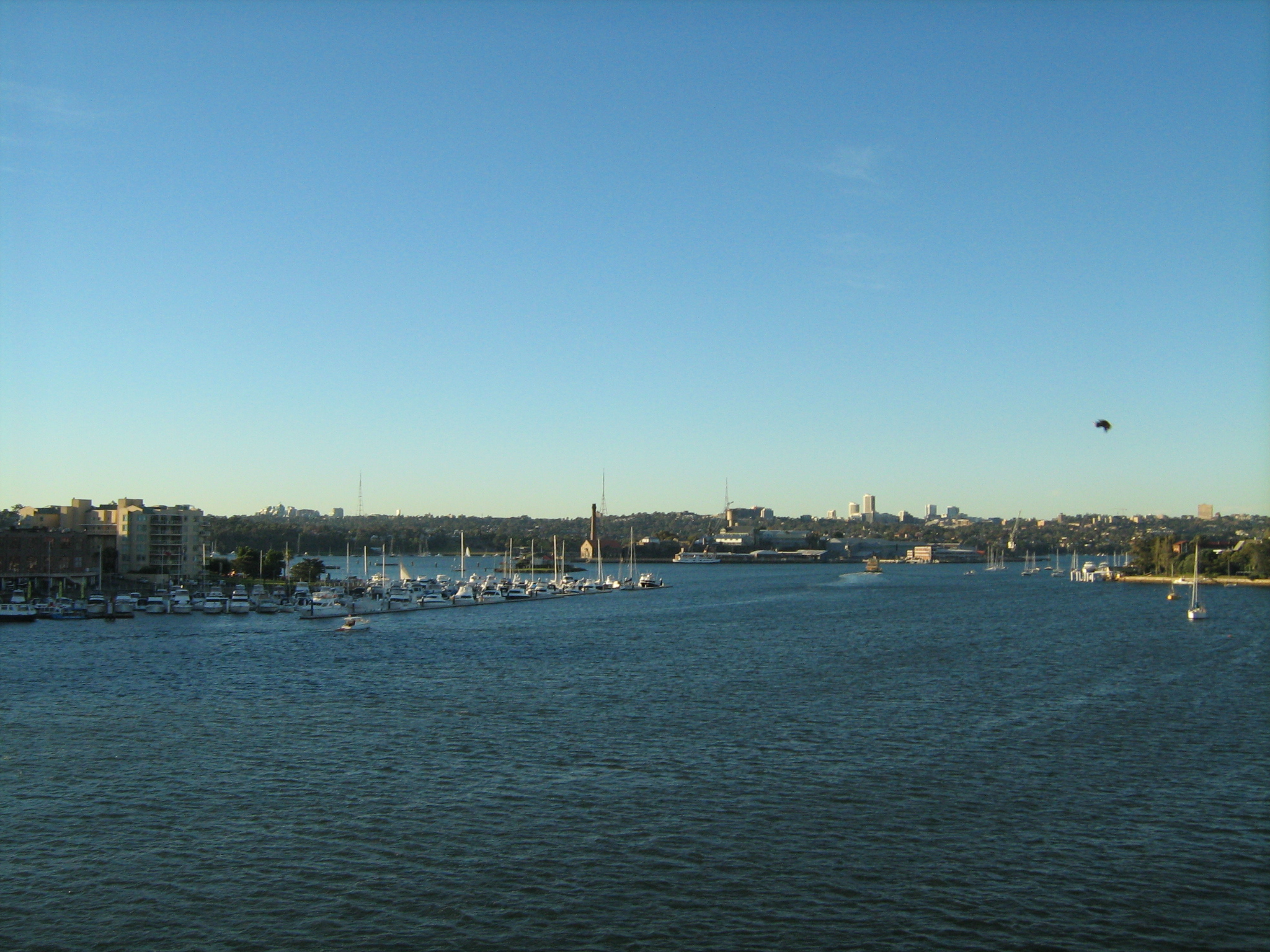
Looking towards the head of Iron Cove with Cockatoo Island in the distance
