= Hawthorne Canal =

Canal in inner-western Sydney, Australia

Hawthorne Long Cove Creek
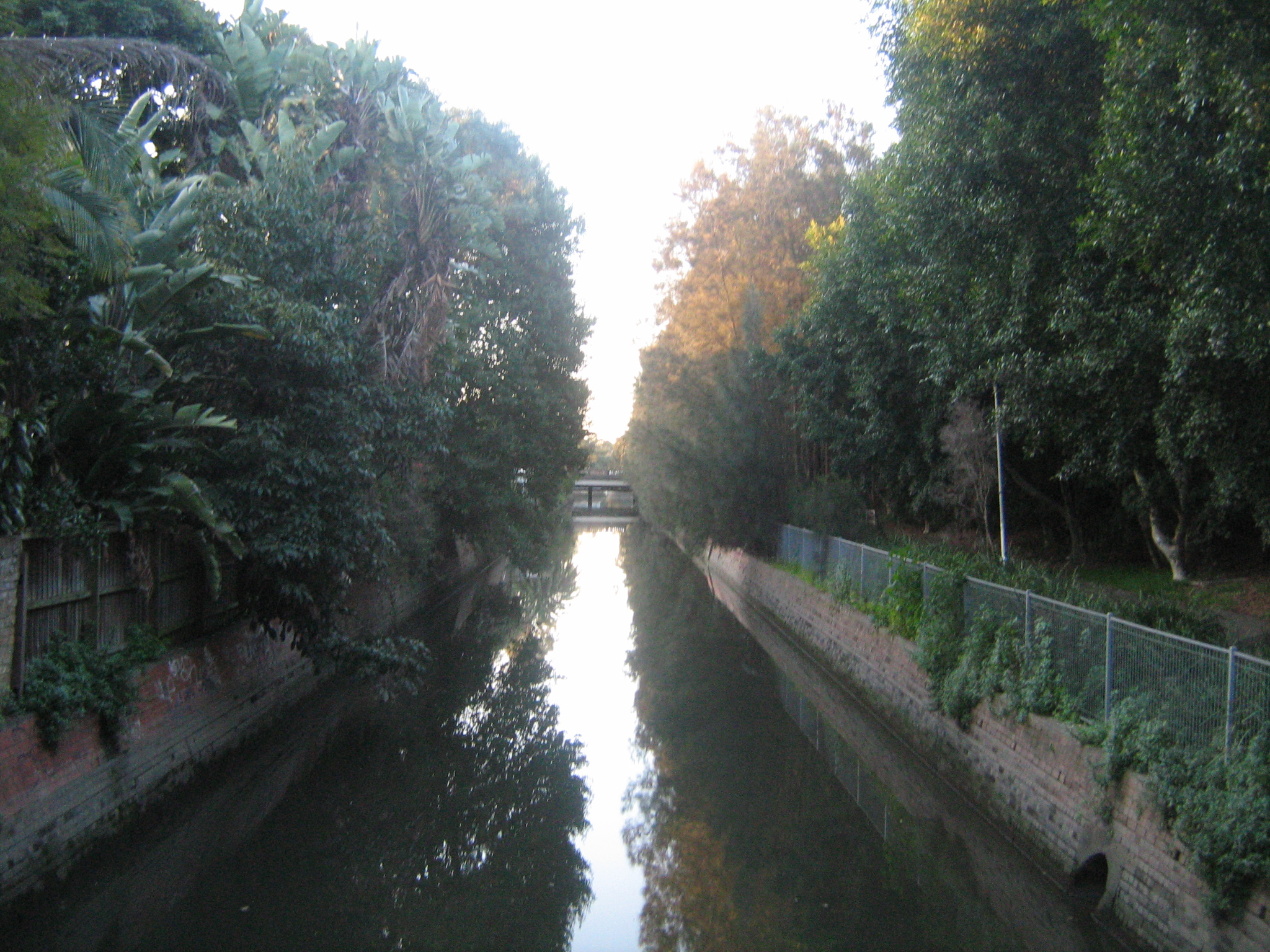
- Hawthorne Canal looking downstream near Lord Street, Haberfield.

Location
- Country: Australia
- State: New South Wales
- Region: Inner West
- Local government area: Inner West Council
- City: Sydney

Physical characteristics
- Source
  - location: Lewisham / Summer Hill
- Mouth: Iron Cove
  - location: Dobroyd Point, Lilyfield
  - coordinates: 33°52′19″S 151°9′2″E

Basin features
- River system: Parramatta River
- Designation: New South Wales State Heritage Register

The Hawthorne Canal, a southern tributary of the Parramatta River, is a heritage-listed artificial waterway located in the western reaches of Sydney Harbour, in the Inner West suburbs of Lewisham, Summer Hill, Haberfield and Leichhardt in New South Wales, Australia.

Hawthorne Canal and Iron Cove Creek are two significant tributaries that flow into Iron Cove, where it flows into Parramatta River, before connecting with Port Jackson. The canal was originally a natural waterway known as Long Cove Creek, that has been straightened and given artificial banks.

== History ==
In January 1890 a team of thirty men, employed by the Harbours and Rivers Department, began clearing the mangroves that lined the banks of Long Cove Creek. It was the beginning of the construction of the first stage of the canal. Within twelve months a navigable stretch of water would exist between Iron Cove and Marion Street. Some housing development had already occurred close to the banks of the creek when parts of the Dobroyd Estate were subdivided in the 1880s, and there was a good deal of local pressure for the extension of the canal to Battle Bridge on Parramatta Road so that the new waterway could be brought within reach of centres of denser population. However, the extension of the canal was never realised.

The canal had a ferry service operating from 1903 through 1904. The service was operated by the Drummoyne–Leichhardt Ferry Company, and there were nine ferries operated each weekday and twelve on Sundays. The ferry wharf was on the eastern side of the canal aligned with Barton Street, and a footbridge was built from the western side. The ferry service became impractical due to sedimentation in the canal, and competition from the nearby tramway. The terminus was near the present-day Hawthorne light rail station.

=== Etymology ===
The canal at the time of its construction was variously known as the Long Cove Canal, the Leichhardt Canal and the Hawthorne Canal. The canal was named in honour of John Hawthorne, who agitated in the NSW Parliament during 1890 for the construction of the canal; and the name was officially gazetted in 1974. The Hawthorne name has also been used for several features around the canal. Hawthorne Canal Reserve is a park on the banks of the canal; Hawthorne Parade is a street running parallel to the canal in Haberfield; and Hawthorne is the name of a light rail stop on the Inner West Light Rail. The light rail line runs parallel to the canal for most of the canal's length.

== Gallery ==
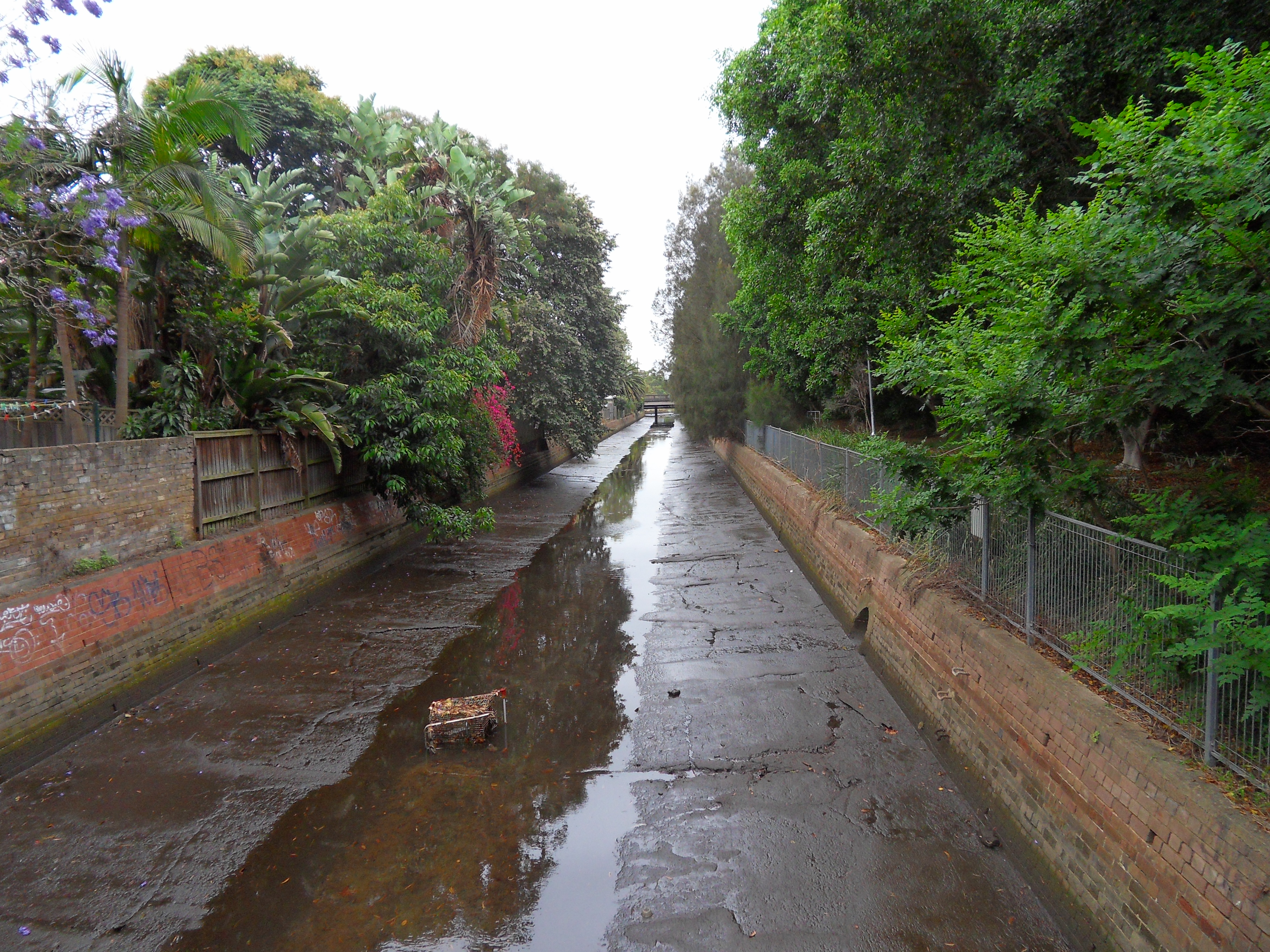
In Haberfield

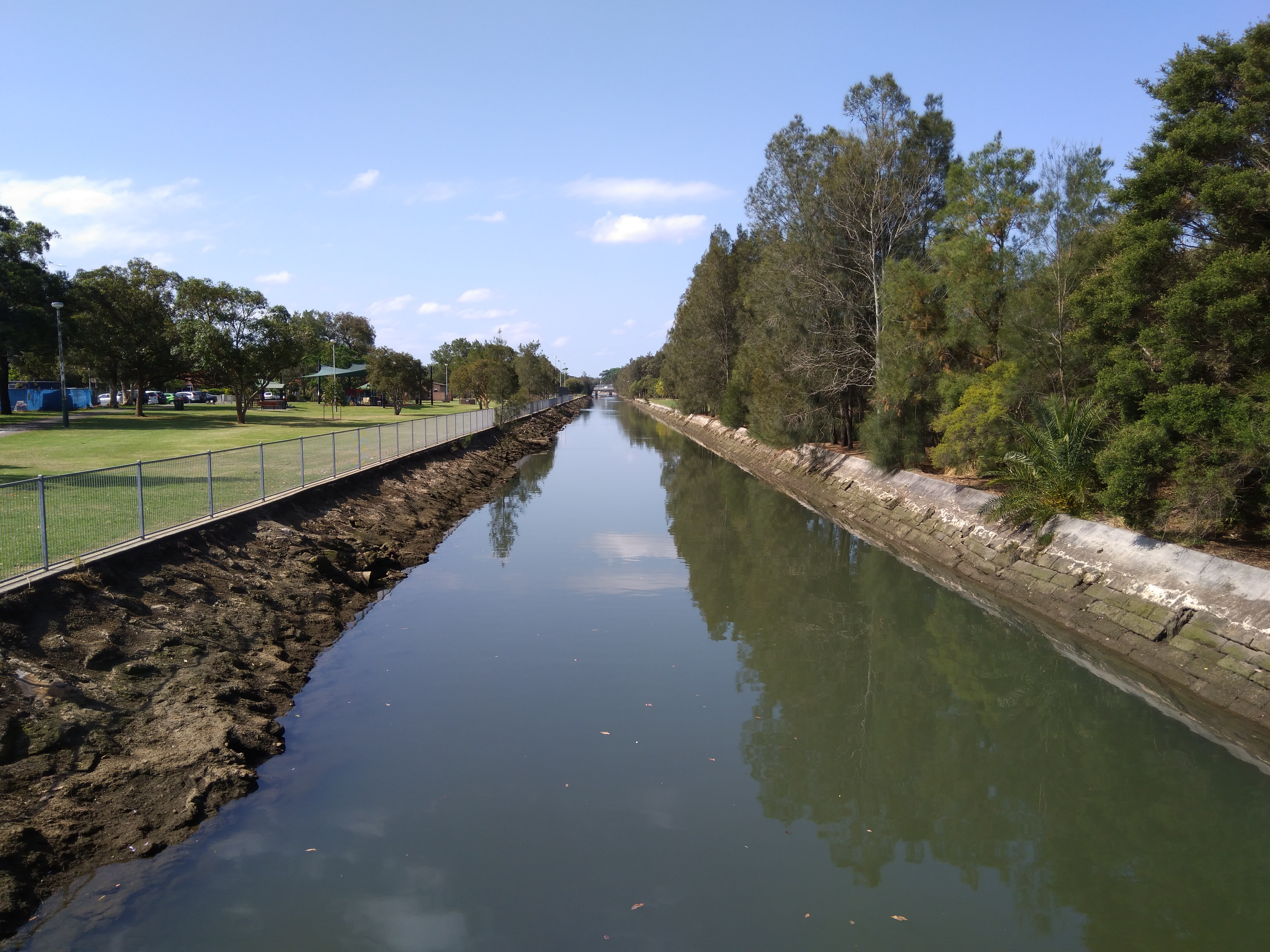
Near Barton Avenue, Haberfield

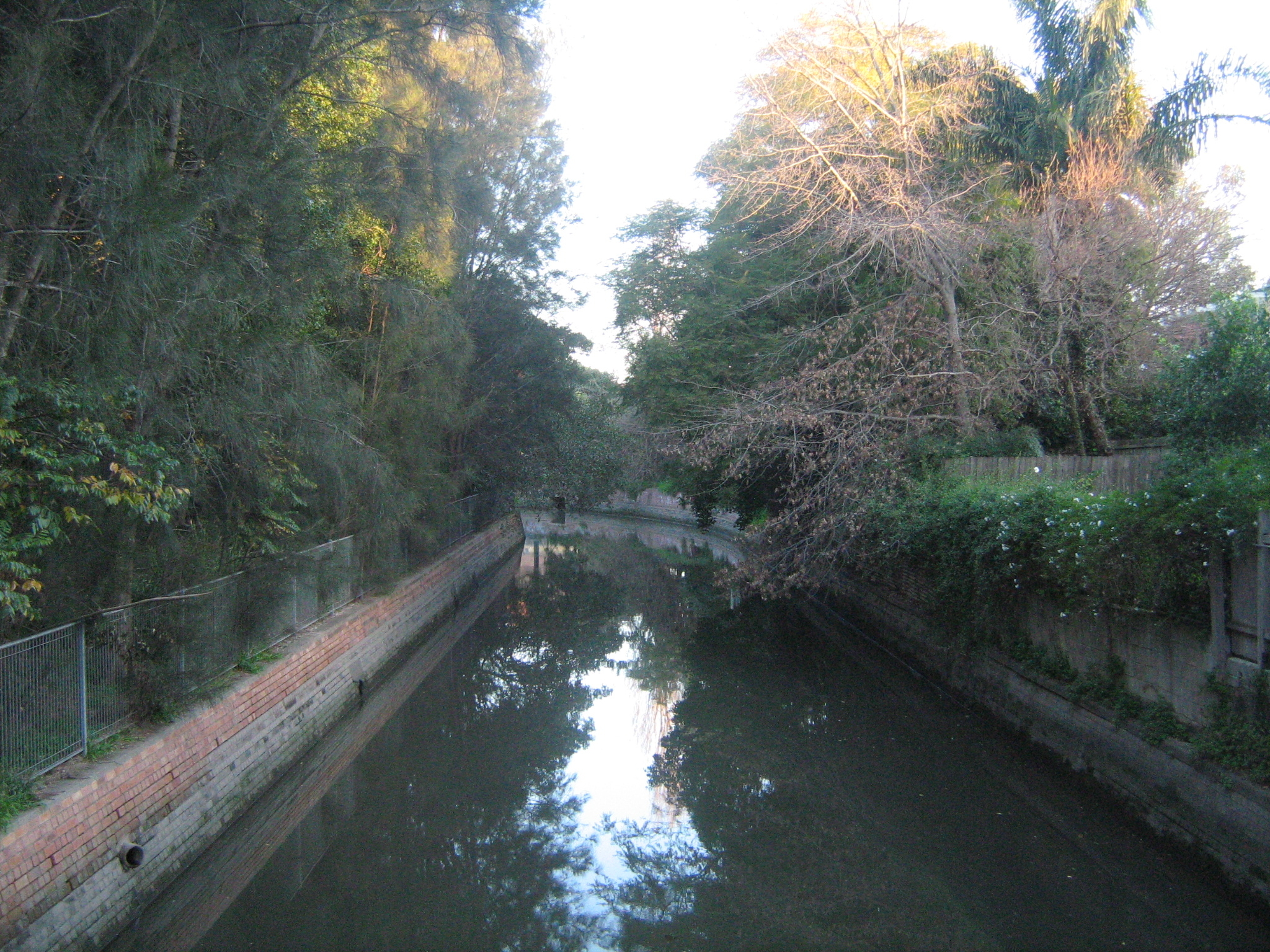
Looking upstream near Lord Street, Haberfield

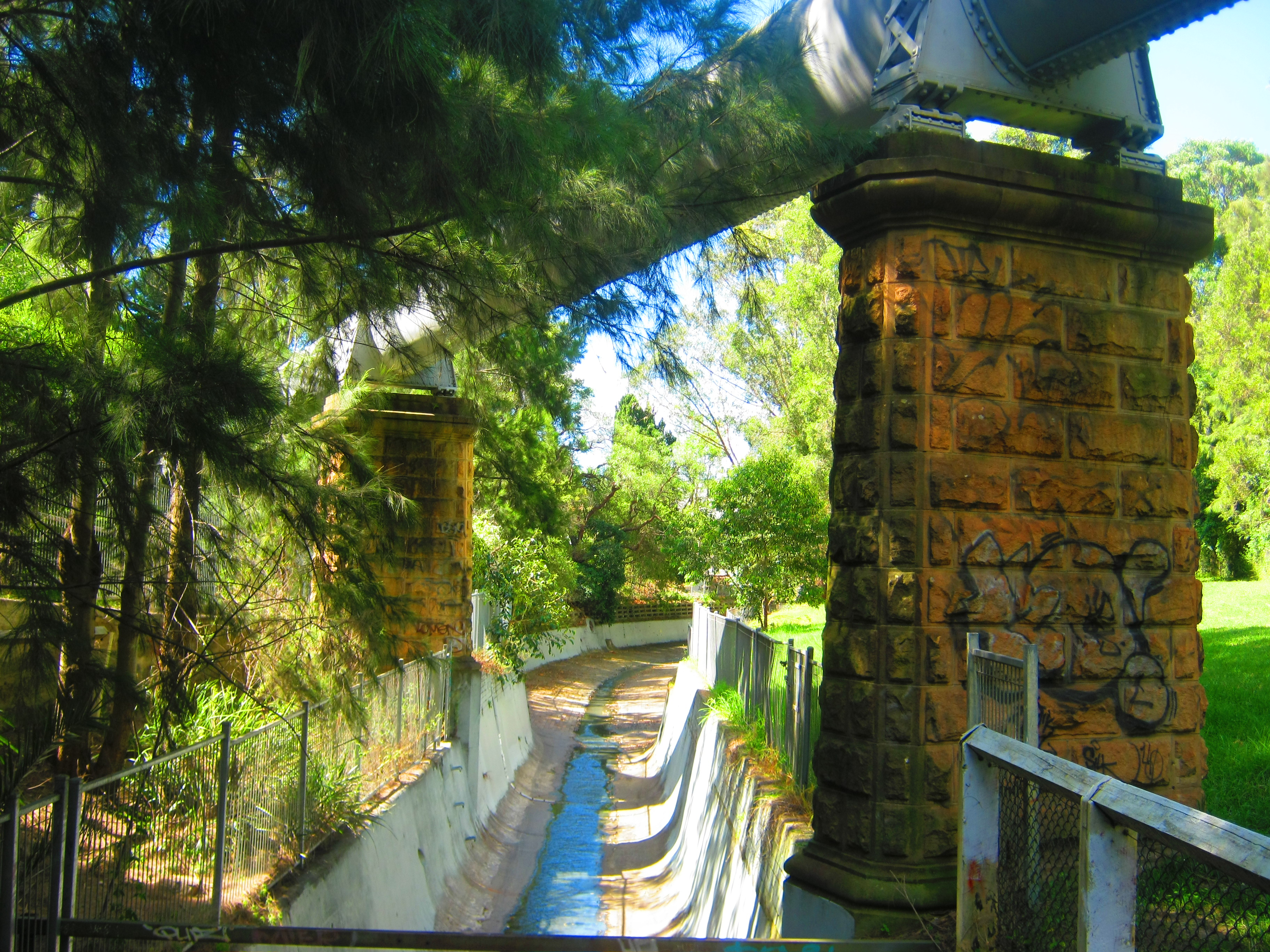
Near Grosvenor Crescent, Summer Hill
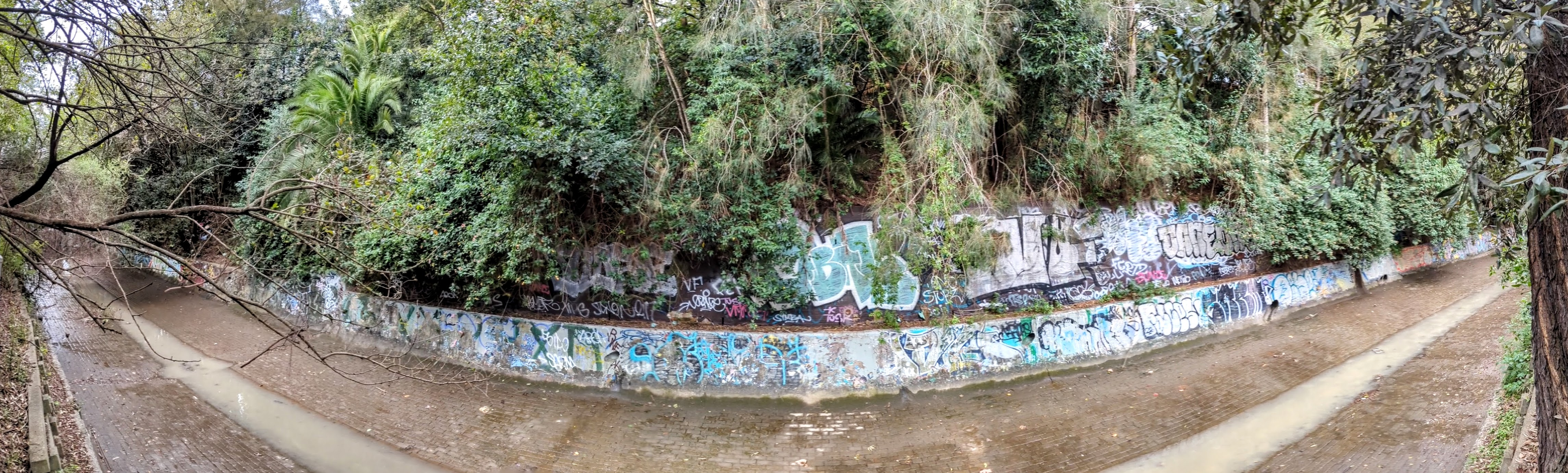
Near Taverners Hill light rail station
