= Rodd Point =

- Suburb
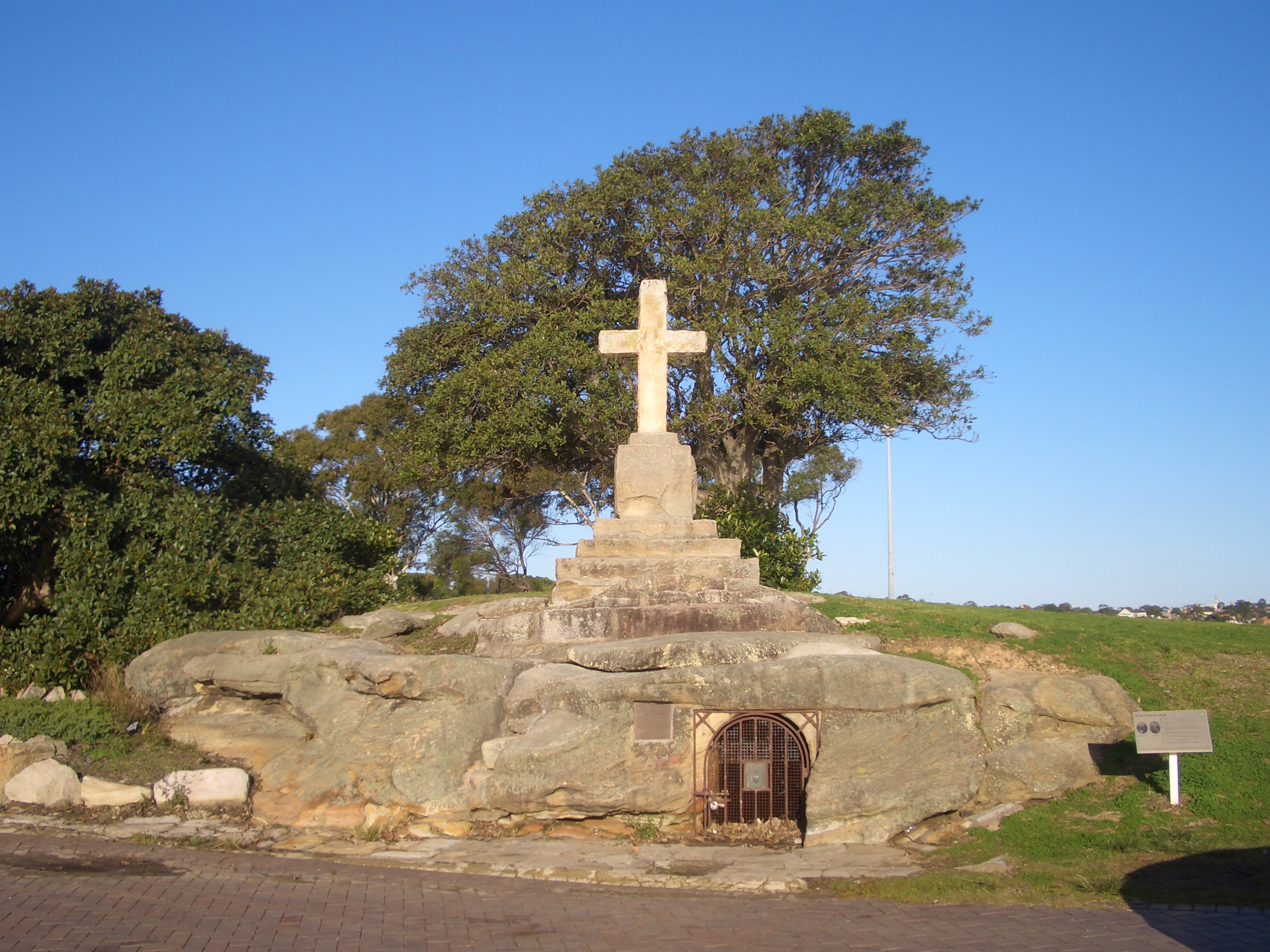
- Rodd Point memorial

- Interactive map of Rodd Point
- Country: Australia
- State: New South Wales
- City: Sydney
- LGA: City of Canada Bay
- Location: 9 km (5.6 mi) west of Sydney CBD

Government
  - State electorate: Drummoyne
  - Federal division: Reid
- Elevation: 7 m (23 ft)

Population
  - Total: 1,380 (2021 census)
- Postcode: 2046
Suburbs around Rodd Point
Russell Lea	Drummoyne	Lilyfield
Five Dock	Rodd Point	Leichhardt
Haberfield

Rodd Point is a suburb in the Inner West of Sydney, in the state of New South Wales, Australia. It is 9 kilometres west of the Sydney central business district in the local government area of the City of Canada Bay.

Rodd Point sits on Iron Cove, on the Parramatta River. Rodd Point is adjacent to the suburbs of Five Dock and Russell Lea. Rodd Island is a small island in Iron Cove, just off Rodd Point. The Rodd Point memorial sits in Rodd Park, beside the Dobroyd Aquatic Club. Rodd Park is also colloquially known as "Point". The Bay Run passes beside Rodd Park and is popular with joggers, walkers and cyclists.

== History ==
Rodd Point is named after the Rodd family who contributed to the area for almost a century, and includes land bought by Brent Clements Rodd (1809–1898) from the Five Dock Farm estate in 1836. Rodd had a large family of 12 children and many of the local streets are named after members of the Rodd family: Brent, Brisbane, Burnell, Clements, Janet, Lenore, Rodd, Trevanion and Undine. Barnstaple Road takes its name from Barnstaple Manor, Rodd's family home which in turn took its name from his birthplace in Britain. The Rodd Point memorial in Rodd Park was originally the Rodd family mausoleum. The bodies were moved to Rookwood Cemetery in 1903.

Rodd Island, which is close to Rodd Point, is also named after Brent Clements Rodd. During the nineteenth century Rodd Island was used by scientists sent by Louis Pasteur to investigate ways of eradicating rabbits. Since then it has been used as a recreation reserve and is now part of the Sydney Harbour National Park. Rodd Park is also locally known as "Point".

== Sport and recreation ==
The Dobroyd Aquatic Club was founded in 1937 and commenced sailing activities from a site at Haberfield, near the Haberfield Rowing club. All classes of boats were allowed to compete. The site was resumed by the Department of Main Roads in 1962 and a new clubhouse opened on 8 October 1964. The building, containing all the member's boats, burnt down in 2005. The club was insured and rebuilt, but the boats were not covered by insurance. Funds were raised for the club members who could not purchase boats without financial support.

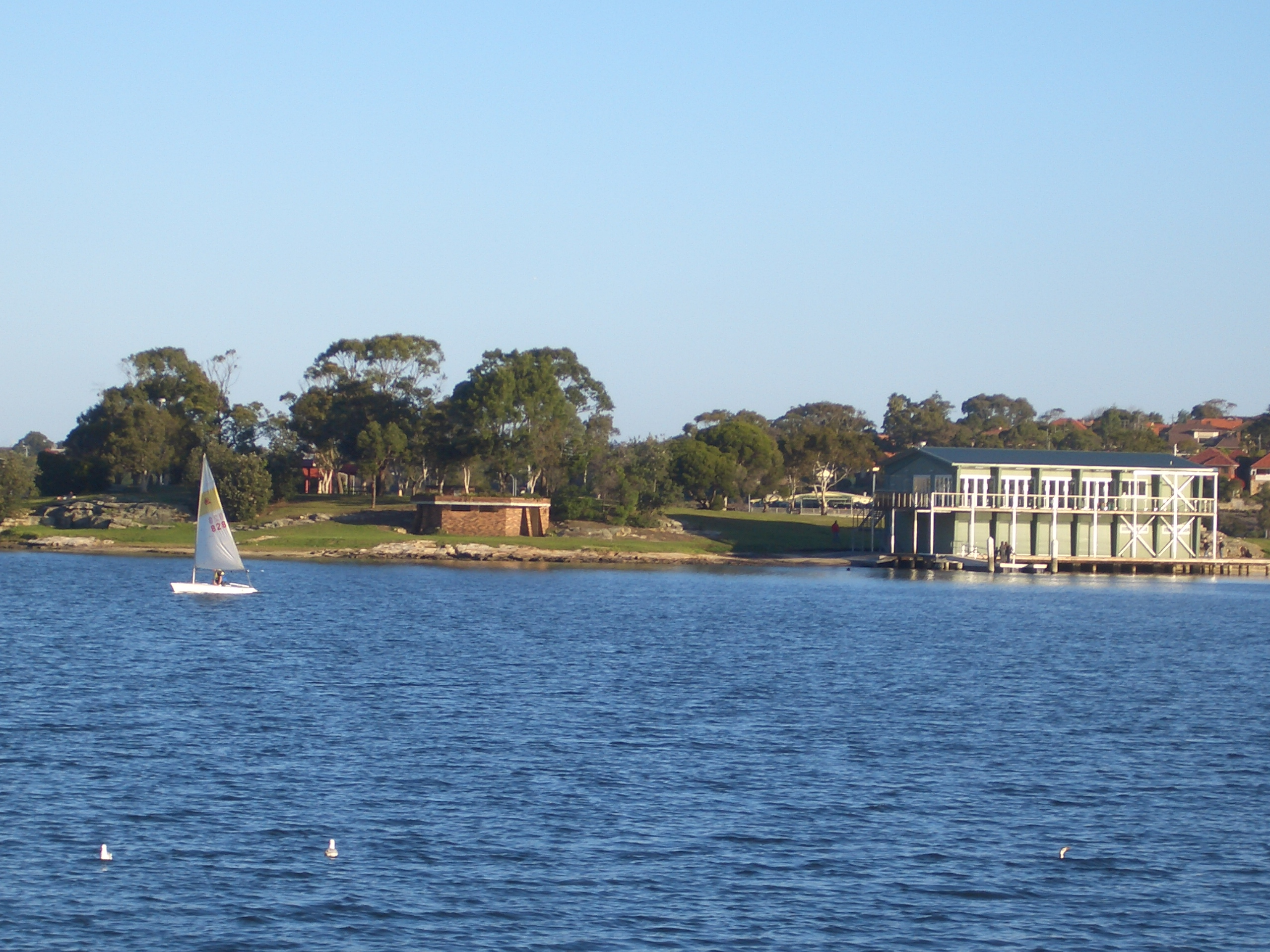
Dobroyd Aquatic Club, view from Russell Lea

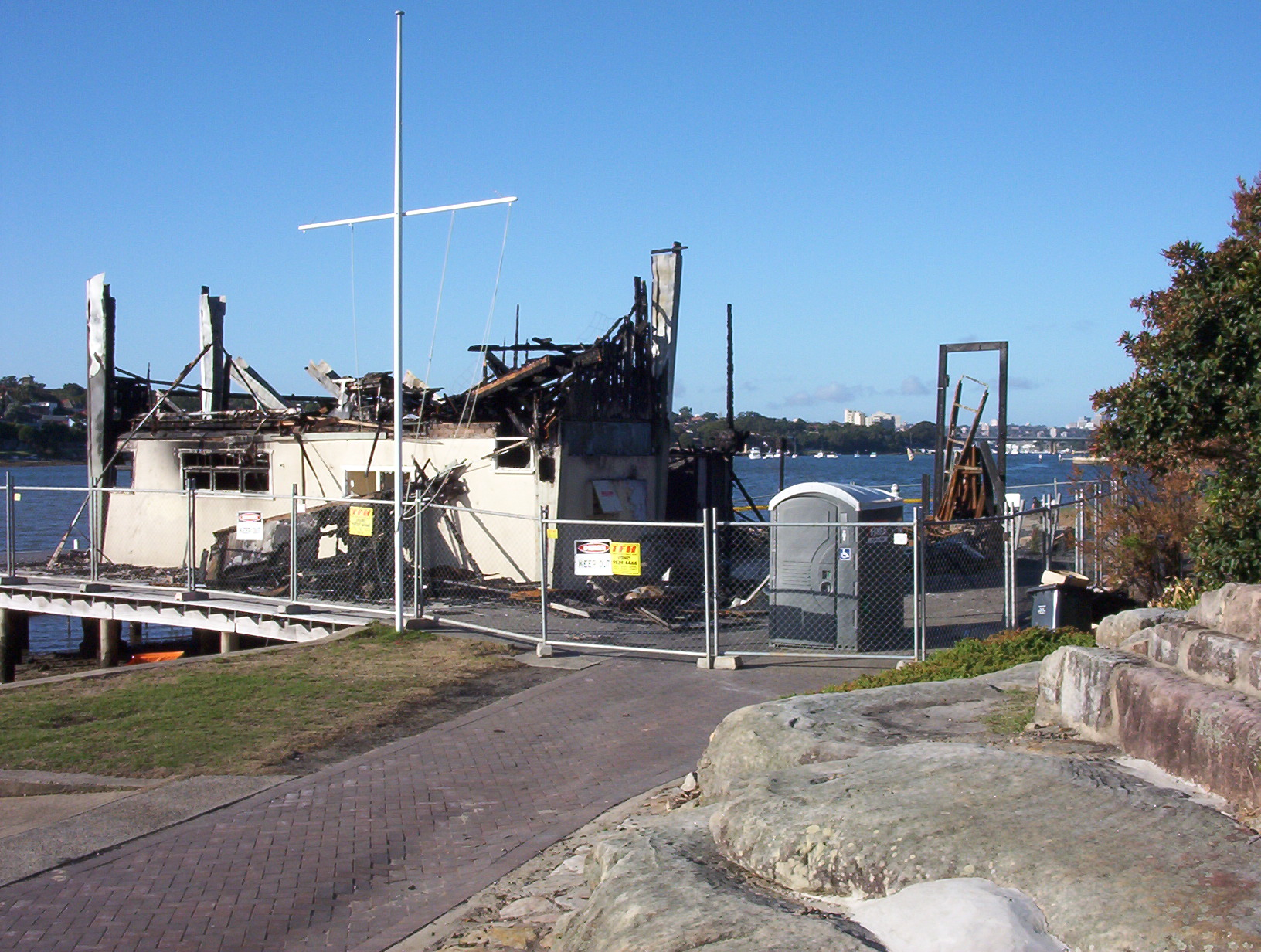
old Dobroyd Aquatic Club remains in 2005
