= Rodd Island =

Small, uninhabited island in the centre of Iron Cove

Rodd
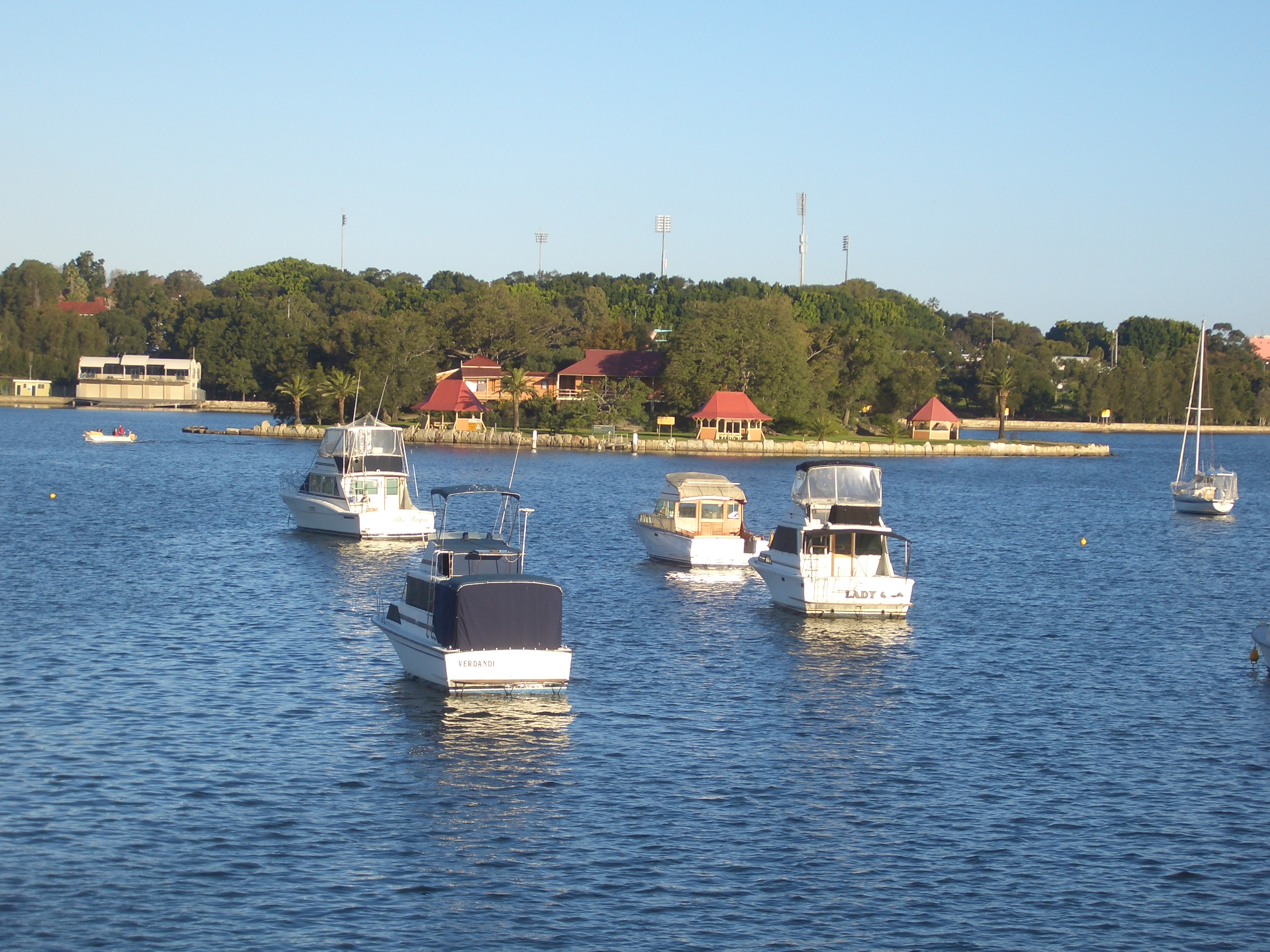
- Rodd Island, view from Russell Lea
- Interactive map of Rodd
- Etymology: Brent Clements Rodd

Geography
- Location: Iron Cove
- Coordinates: 33°51′49″S 151°09′12″E
- Adjacent to: Port Jackson
- Area: 6,700 m^{2} (72,000 sq ft)

Administration
- Australia
- State: New South Wales
- Largest settlement: Sydney

Demographics
- Population: unpopulated

Rodd Island is a 6,700-square-metre (0.67 ha) island on the Parramatta River in Sydney, Australia. It lies in the centre of Iron Cove, between the suburbs of Drummoyne, Russell Lea, Rodd Point, Haberfield, Lilyfield and Leichhardt. It is located west of the Sydney Harbour upstream and the Harbour Bridge. Today the island is uninhabited, and forms part of the Sydney Harbour National Park. The island has had various other names over its history: Rabbit Island, Rhode Island, Snake Island and Jack Island.

== History ==
The island is named after Brent Clements Rodd, who had a long association with the island and the local area. He first attempted to buy the island from the government in 1842. The Rodd family, who lived on the western shore of Iron Cove in what is now the suburb of Rodd Point, used the island for recreation. Rodd tried again to purchase the island in 1859 and even put down a deposit of 17 pounds on it. However, the transaction was never completed and the island eventually became part of the first public recreation reserve in Sydney Harbour in 1879. Despite being a solicitor, Rodd managed neither to purchase the island, nor to have his deposit refunded.

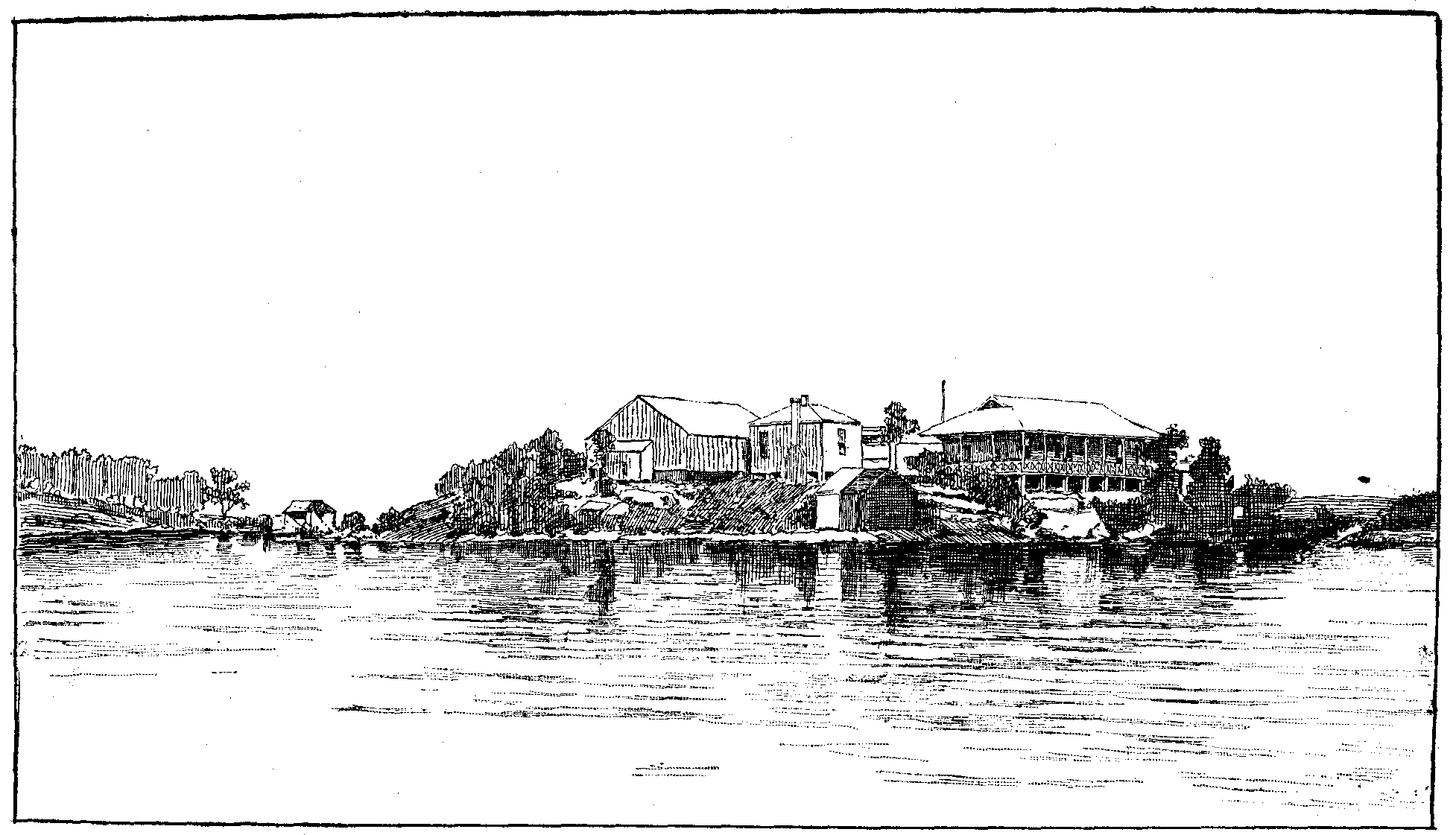
Australian Pasteur Institute on Rodd Island ca. 1890

Between 1888 and 1894, the island was used as a laboratory by scientists working for the Pasteur Institute, who were researching the use of the chicken cholera microbe to control Australia's rabbit population. Louis Pasteur sent his nephew, Doctor Adrien Loir to conduct the experimentation in Australia and facilities were constructed on the island. Pasteur was interested because he had been conducting similar research in France and Henry Parkes had offered a 25,000 pound reward to anyone who could solve the rabbit infestation problem. However, the research received an unfavourable report in 1889 and from June, 1890, the facilities were used to manufacture sheep and cattle vaccines for anthrax and pleuro-pneumonia.

The island was briefly home to Sarah Bernhardt's dogs. They were quarantined there during her 1891 world tour at the suggestion of Loir. Bernhardt was a frequent visitor to the island during her time in Sydney.

After 1894, the laboratories were demolished and the research station residence was converted into a dance hall, which still stands there, along with two summer houses and a gazebo constructed in the early 20th century. At this time, the island was managed by the Rodd Island Recreation Trust. Further changes were in the pipeline but never went ahead because of an outbreak of bubonic plague in Sydney in 1900. The Sydney Harbour Trust took over managing the island and they doubled its area by reclaiming land from the bay and constructing sea walls. Once the outbreak of the plague had finished, the island became a recreation area.

During the Second World War, from 1944, the island was used as a training base for the US Army. After the war, it reverted to its former use as a recreation area. The island became part of the Sydney Harbour National Park in February, 1982, and is now a popular picnic area and function centre. Loir's restored house was opened to the public in 1996.

== See also ==
- Sydney Harbour National Park
