= Iron Cove Bridge =

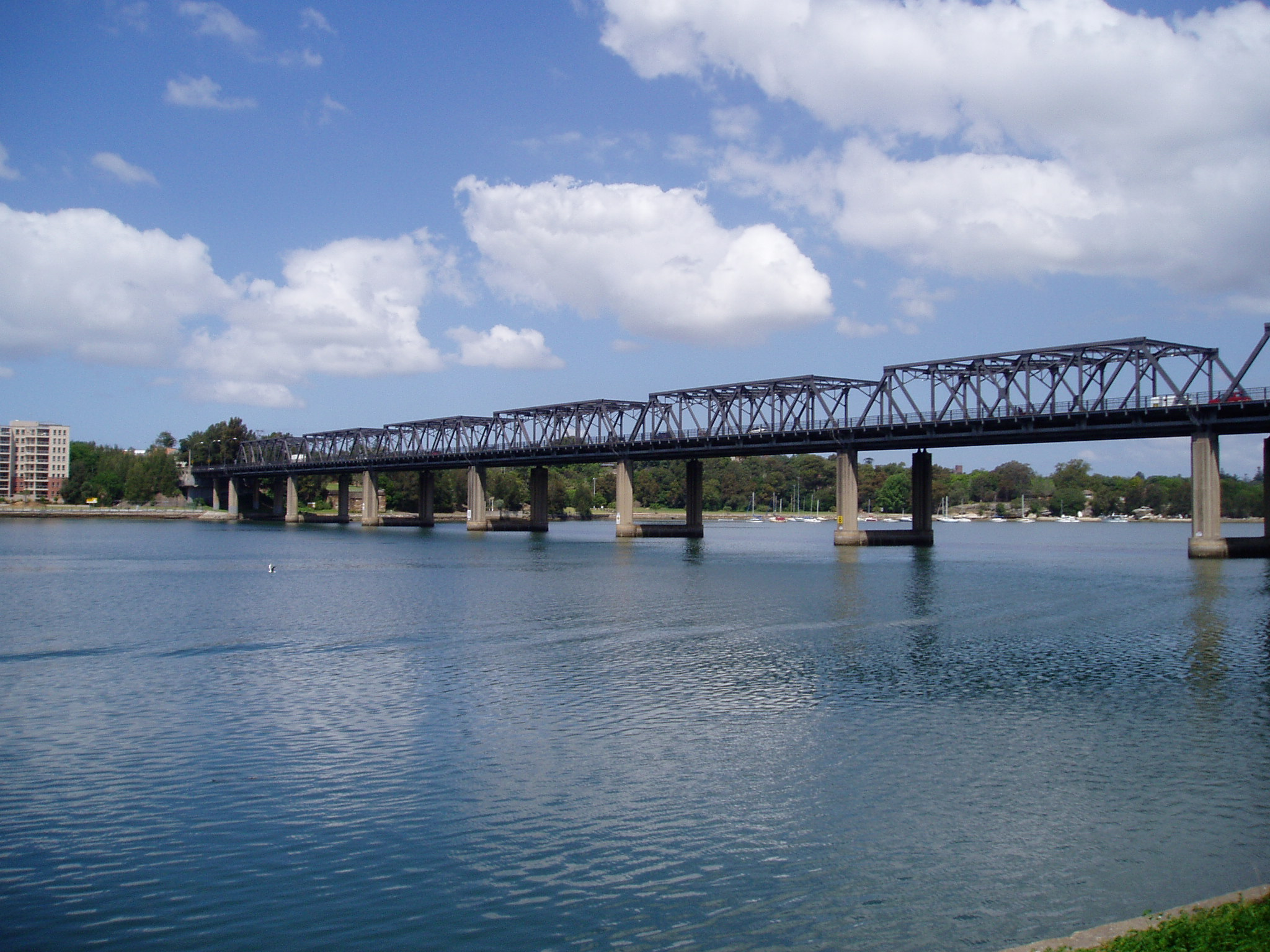
- The heritage-listed truss Iron Cove Bridge, pictured in 2006
- Coordinates: 33°51′32″S 151°09′44″E
- Carries: Victoria Road: Inner West Busway; Motor vehicles
- Crosses: Iron Cove
- Locale: City of Canada Bay, Sydney, New South Wales, Australia
- Begins: Drummoyne (west)
- Ends: Rozelle (east)
- Other name: RTA Bridge No. 65
- Owner: Transport for NSW

Characteristics
- Design: Pratt truss bridge
- Material: Steel
- Trough construction: Reinforced concrete
- Total length: 461.26 metres (1,513 ft)
- Width: 13.7 metres (45 ft)
- Longest span: 52 metres (171 ft)
- No. of spans: 11: 4 approach; 7 bridge
- Clearance below: 12 metres (39 ft)

History
- Designer: Laurie Challis
- Contracted lead designer: Department of Main Roads
- Fabrication by: Clyde Engineering
- Construction start: 1947
- Opened: July 1955
- Replaces: Iron Cove Bridge (1882–1955)

New South Wales Heritage Register
- Official name: Iron Cove Bridge; RTA Bridge No. 65
- Type: State heritage (built)
- Designated: 21 July 2003
- Reference no.: s.170
- Type: Road Bridge
- Category: Transport – Land

Location
- Interactive map of Iron Cove Bridge

The Iron Cove Bridge is a heritage-listed road bridge that carries Victoria Road (A40) across Iron Cove, between the Sydney suburbs of Drummoyne and Rozelle. Iron Cove is an arm of Sydney Harbour.

== First bridge ==
Iron Cove Bridge (former)
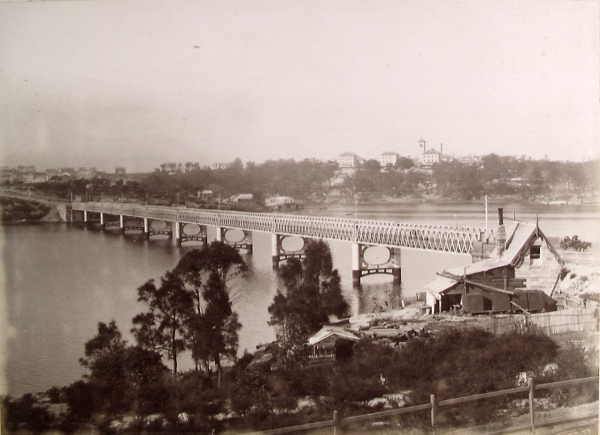
- Coordinates: 33°51′32″S 151°09′44″E

Characteristics
- Material: Wrought iron
- Total length: 347 metres (1,137 ft 3 in)
- Width: 7 metres (24 ft)
- Longest span: 38 metres (126 ft)
- No. of spans: 9
- Piers in water: 8

History
- Construction start: April 1878
- Opened: 22 November 1882
- Replaced by: Iron Cove Bridge (1955–current)

The original Iron Cove Bridge was constructed of nine wrought iron lattice girder spans each 38.5 m long, and opened in 1882 after four years of construction. In conjunction with the opening of the first Gladesville Bridge the previous year, the opening of the bridge provided a ferry-free route for road traffic from Sydney via Drummoyne to the Ryde area and then in 1885, with the opening of the first Fig Tree Bridge across the Lane Cove River, to the North Shore.

All that remains at Iron Cove of the original bridge are the sandstone abutments situated on both sides of the cove approximately 20 metres (66 ft) south of the current bridge. The abutment on the Drummoyne side is listed on the local government heritage list.

=== Reuse of bridge components ===
When the replacement bridge was opened in 1955, Gordon Duff, the Shire Engineer for Jemalong Shire Council (now part of Forbes Shire) negotiated with the Department of Main Roads to buy the lattice girders from the original bridge for £18,000 and had them transported to Forbes, and they were re-used by Jemalong Shire to build a number of bridges. Because of their good resistance to corrosion and the relatively low humidity in the area, all nine of the 1882 bridge's pairs of girders are still in use in three bridges on country roads in the Forbes district. although the smallest of these has been superseded. The longest of the three bridges is the Bundaburrah Creek bridge on New Grenfell Road 9 km southeast of Forbes, for which five of the nine pairs of girders were reused. This bridge opened in March 1961. Another three of the pairs were used for the bridge over Goobang Creek on Yarrabandai Rd at Gunning Gap, 25 km northwest of Forbes, and the final pair was reused for the Mafeking Bridge over Back Creek on Wirrinya Road near Garema, 21 km south of Forbes. However this bridge was replaced by a new two-span pre-stressed concrete bridge in mid 2023.

== Current bridges ==
A decision to replace the original bridge was made in 1939 just prior to the outbreak of World War II. Design work began in 1942 but due to World War II construction by Hornibrook McKenzie Clarke Pty Ltd was unable to be commenced until 1947. The bridge was officially opened by Joseph Cahill on 30 July 1955.

Designed by Laurie Challis from the NSW Department of Main Roads, the Iron Cove Bridge is an impressive steel truss bridge. It consists of four 18-metre (59 ft) plate girder approach spans and seven 52-metre (171 ft) steel Pratt truss spans for a total length of 461.26 metres (1,513 ft). Four lanes of traffic are located within the truss spans and the overall width of the roadway is 13.7 metres (45 ft) between kerbs. The roadway consists of a 127-millimetre (5 in) reinforced concrete deck slab with an inset for tram tracks in the centre portion.

The bridge has aesthetically distinctive piers and abutments which reflect the Inter-War Art Deco style. Furthermore, it was the last steel truss bridge to be constructed in New South Wales in which rivets were used for field connections prior to the introduction of high strength bolts.

The bridge was built to carry four lanes of traffic, however in 1970 the footway along the southwestern side, outside of the truss spans, was converted to a fifth lane (meaning that traffic using this lane must remain in the lane for the full length of the bridge). Until the bridge duplication was completed in 2011, the default configuration was three westbound and two eastbound lanes, switching to two westbound and three eastbound lanes during the morning peak.

=== Bridge duplication ===
Iron Cove Bridge (duplication)
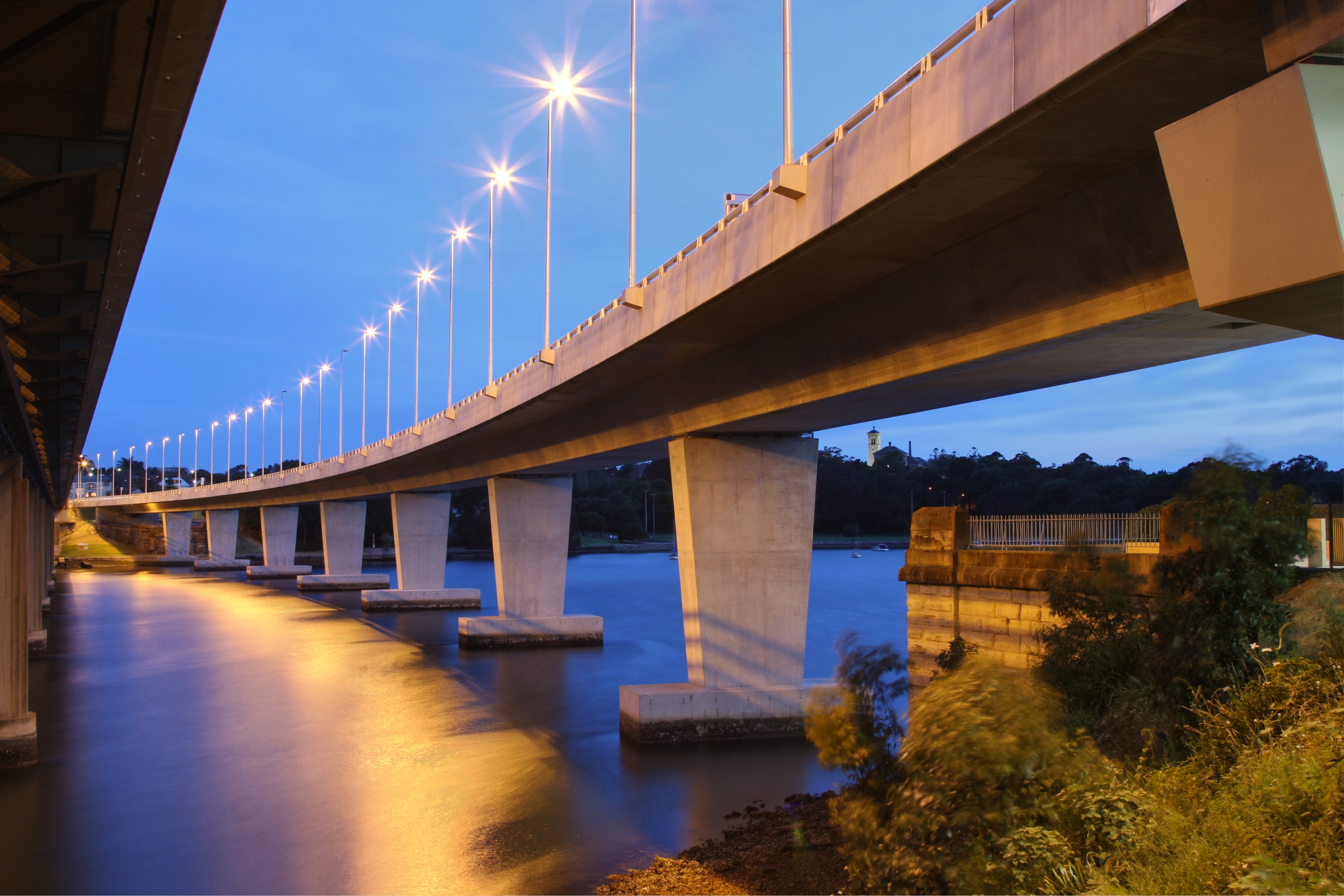
- Coordinates: 33°51′32″S 151°09′44″E
- Carries: Victoria Road: Inner West Busway; Motor vehicles; Grade-separated shared pedestrian footpath and cycleway

Characteristics
- Design: Box girder
- Material: Concrete

History
- Construction start: July 2009
- Opened: 28 January 2011

In April 2009, the NSW Government approved plans to construct a second bridge over Iron Cove as part of the Inner West Busway along Victoria Road.

During the proposal phase there were strong protests by local residents as well as both local area councils of the City of Canada Bay (Drummoyne side) and Leichhardt (Rozelle side). Local residents within both Drummoyne and Rozelle formed the Victoria Road Community against the duplicate bridge being built, and organised public demonstrations were held, the last of which on 29 March 2009 attracted over 3000 protest marchers. Opposition to the new bridge was based on independent evaluations concluding that there would be only slight improvements to traffic congestion citybound on Victoria Road during peak hour while local congestion would worsen. Additionally, parkland on both sides of the new bridge would be reduced and independent environmental studies showed the local environment detrimentally impacted by the new bridge construction.

Work on the duplicate bridge commenced in July 2009 and the bridge was opened to traffic late on 28 January 2011. The new bridge was constructed on the western side of the 1955 bridge and carries three westbound traffic lanes with one lane designated as a morning peak bus lane. There is also a 4.3-metre-wide (14 ft) grade-separated shared pedestrian footpath and cycleway on the western side of the new bridge which connects to both The Bay Run and Victoria Road. The 1955 bridge now carries three citybound traffic lanes and a 24-hour bus lane. The additional lane of the 1955 bridge outside the bridge supports was closed and is now only used for maintenance reasons.

== See also ==
- List of bridges in Sydney
- List of Art Deco buildings in Sydney
- The Bay Run, a popular pathway for joggers, walkers and cyclists which passes across Iron Cove Bridge
