= Brent Clements Rodd =

Australian lawyer & landowner (1809–1898)

Brent Clements Rodd (1809–1898) was a colonial lawyer and landowner in 19th century Sydney, Australia. Rodd Island in Sydney Harbour is named after him.
