= Lilyfield =

- Suburb
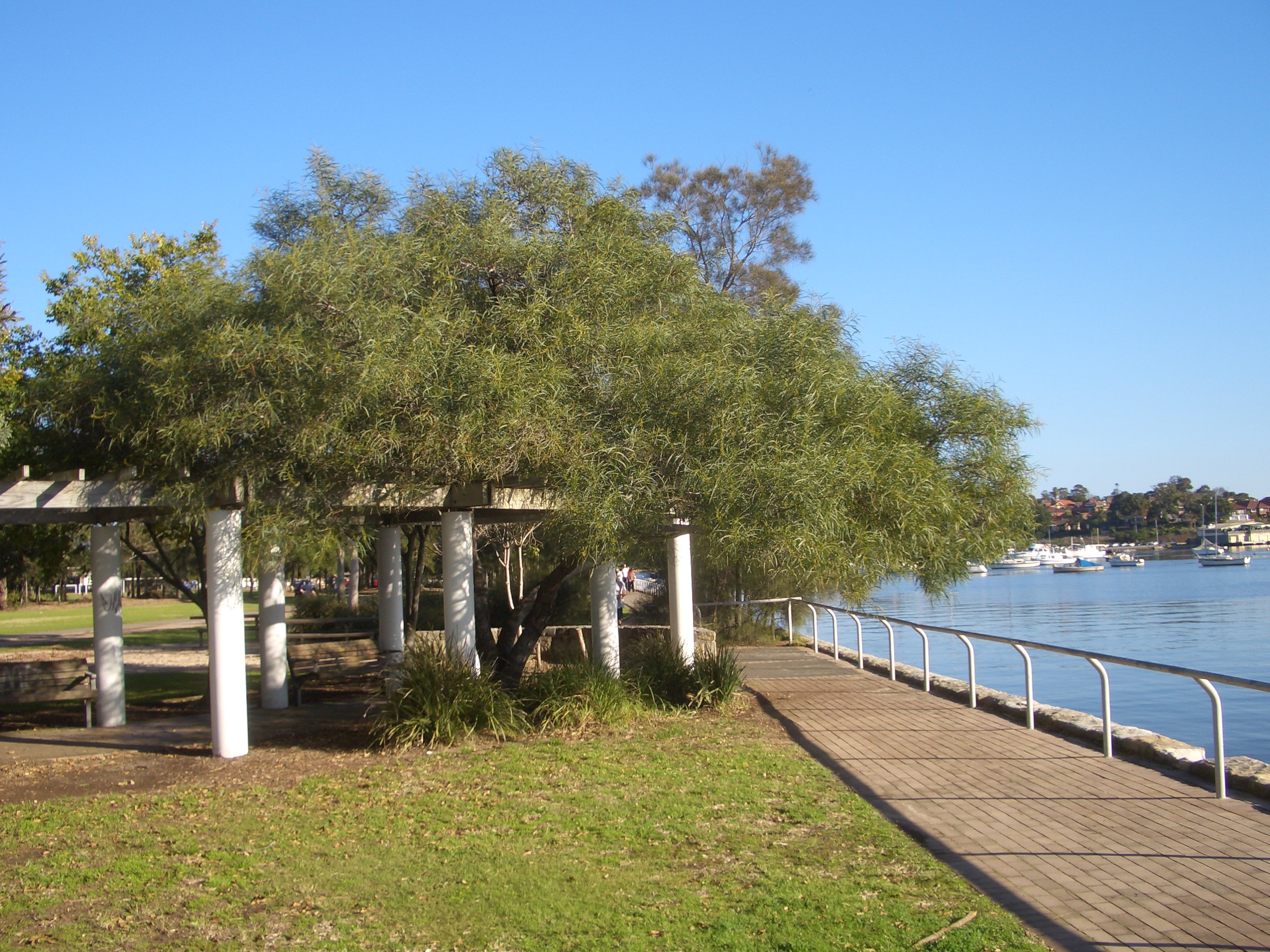
- Sensory Park in Leichhardt Park

- Interactive map of Lilyfield
- Coordinates: 33°52′23″S 151°9′58″E
- Country: Australia
- State: New South Wales
- City: Sydney
- LGA: Inner West Council
- Location: 6 km (3.7 mi) west of Sydney CBD

Government
  - State electorate: Balmain
  - Federal division: Grayndler, Sydney

Area
  - Total: 2.16 km^{2} (0.83 sq mi)
- Elevation: 37 m (121 ft)

Population
  - Total: 7,641 (2021 census)
  - Density: 3,538/km^{2} (9,162/sq mi)
- Postcode: 2040
Suburbs around Lilyfield
Rodd Point	Drummoyne	Rozelle
Haberfield	Lilyfield	Glebe
Annandale	Leichhardt	Forest Lodge

Lilyfield is a suburb in the Inner West of Sydney, in the state of New South Wales, Australia. Lilyfield is located 6 kilometres west of the Sydney central business district, in the local government area of the Inner West Council.

Lilyfield is nestled in between the suburbs of Annandale, Rozelle and Leichhardt and is bounded to the west by Iron Cove. Originally a working-class area, today Lilyfield like many inner-city suburbs is becoming increasingly gentrified. Property investors, eager to capitalise on the suburb's proximity to the Sydney CBD, have purchased many of the original workers' cottages to renovate or develop.

== History ==
Popular belief has it that the area was once farmland and was named for the lilies that reportedly grew in the fields. However, its name origin remains unclear. Lilyfield was originally part of the suburb of Leichhardt.

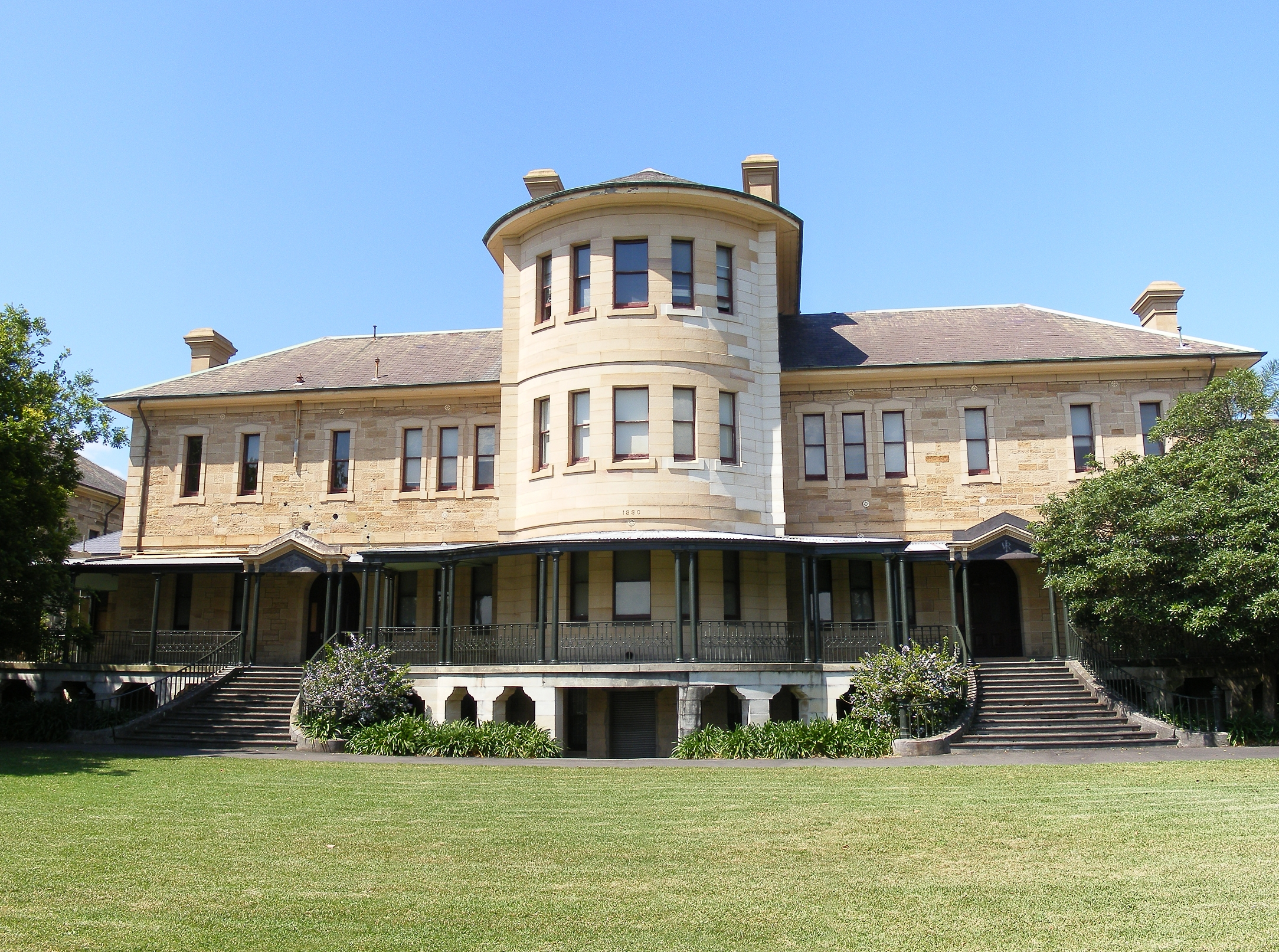
Kirkbride complex, Callan Park hospital

The most dominant landmark in the area is the former Callan Park hospital. This was built on land acquired from the Callan Estates, a property between Balmain Road and Iron Cove. A psychiatric hospital was designed by James Barnet, the government architect, based on an asylum in Kent and utilising the principles of Dr Kirkbride, an American psychiatrist. Completed in 1884, the hospital was known until 1914 as the Callan Park Hospital for the Insane; the main part of the hospital, a cluster of sandstone buildings, was called the Kirkbride complex.

More recently, the Kirkbride complex became the home of the Sydney College of the Arts, and the hospital functions were confined to the western buildings. This is now known as Rozelle Hospital. The Kirkbride complex is listed on the Register of the National Estate.

After the construction of the City West Link Road in the 1990s, the suburb was effectively split into two parts. One half on the Rozelle side of the road, the other half on the Leichhardt side. This dramatic change in the geography did much to disrupt the sense of community in the relatively secluded suburb and almost led to its being subsumed into the neighbouring suburbs.

Orange Grove is a small locality within Lilyfield. Centred around Orange Grove Plaza, the locality shares its name with a primary school, market, and pub. The locality is served by the Inner West Light Rail.

== Heritage listings ==
Lilyfield has a number of heritage-listed sites, including:

- Balmain Road: Callan Park Hospital for the Insane
- Balmain Road: Broughton Hall
- Piper Street: White's Creek Aqueduct

== Demographics ==
Historical population
Year	Pop.	±%
2001	6,945	—
2006	6,761	−2.6%
2011	7,342	+8.6%
2016	7,616	+3.7%
2021	7,641	+0.3%

At the 2021 census the population of Lilyfield was 7,641.

- Aboriginal and Torres Strait Islander people made up 1.6% of the population.
- 68.1% of people were born in Australia. The next most common other countries of birth were England 5.9% and New Zealand 2.6%.
- 78.6% of people spoke only English at home. Other languages spoken at home included Italian 2.9% and Greek 1.8%.
- The most common responses for religion were no religion 49.0% and Catholic 22.7%.

At the 2016 census, there were 7,616 people in Lilyfield. The 2011 census of population shows there were 7,342 people in Lilyfield, with a median age of 38. In the 2006 census there were 6,761 people in Lilyfield, while in the 2001 census gives a total population of 6,945.

== Transport ==
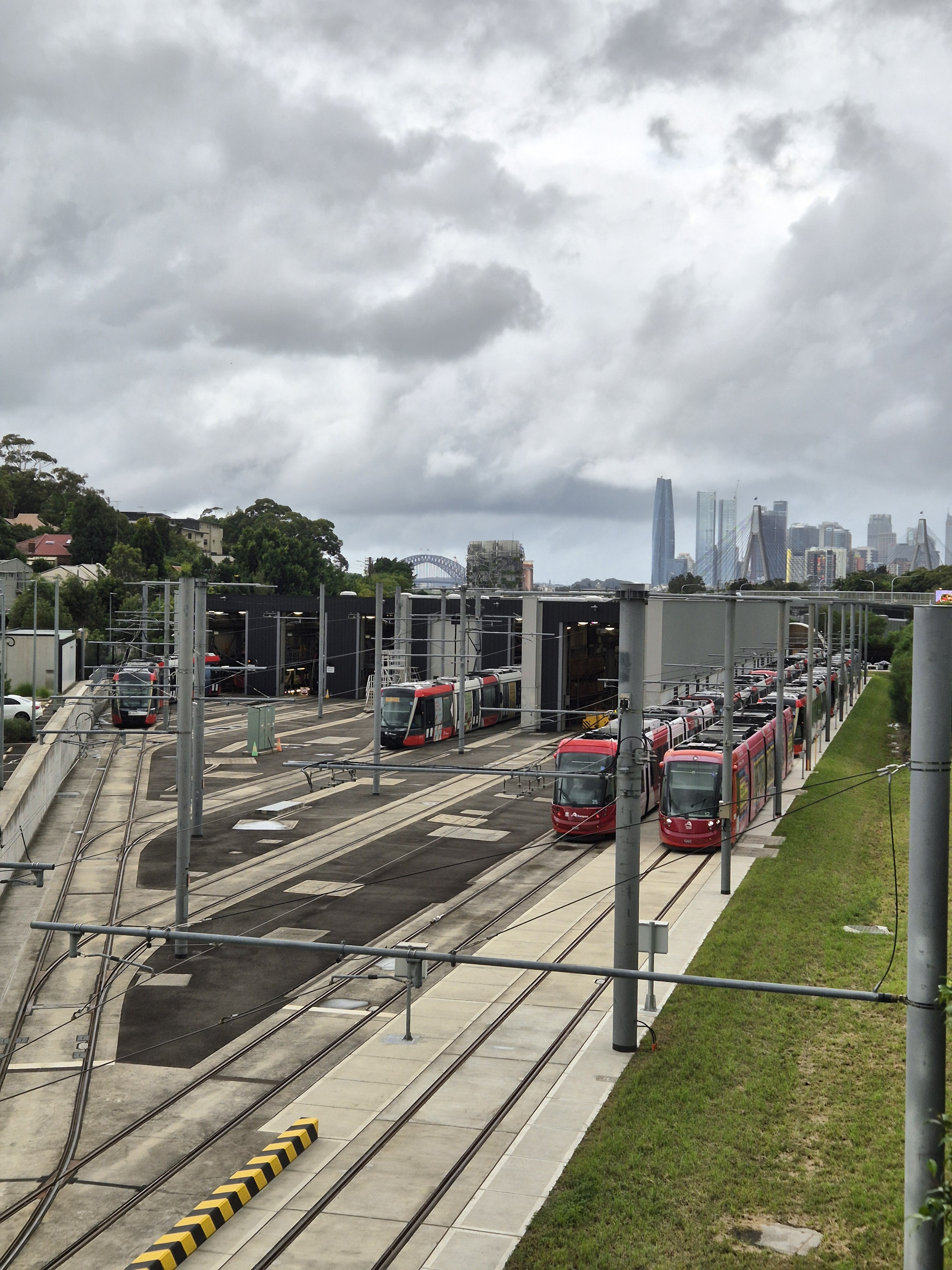
Lilyfield Maintenance Depot on the site of the Rozelle Yards in 2017.

Lilyfield is served by the Inner West Light Rail, with a stop on Catherine Street. The station, situated on a former goods railway line, opened in 2000. The stop was the western terminus of the light rail until 2014, when the line was extended along the route of the former goods line to Dulwich Hill. Lilyfield was also the terminus of a tram line in the original Sydney tram system.

The 437 bus service runs from Lilyfield with no stops to the Sydney CBD with travel time of 7 minutes. The 470 bus service runs from Lilyfield to the Sydney CBD via Glebe, Broadway and Elizabeth Street. The 469 bus service runs from Leichhardt to Glebe. The 440 service runs from Rozelle to Bondi Junction via Leichhardt, Camperdown and Paddington. The 445 services run from Balmain to Campsie railway station, via Norton Street. Route 447 includes a diversion to serve the Lilyfield light rail station.

The City West Link is a major arterial road, which is part of the A44 and crosses the Anzac Bridge. It provides an alternative route to Parramatta Road for the Sydney CBD from Ashfield.

Bicycle routes in Lilyfield include part of the regional east–west route from Parramatta to the Sydney CBD, along Lilyfield Road, the Bay Run path around Iron Cove, and the Whites Creek path, which provides a north–south route from Parramatta Road to The Crescent at White Bay.

== Parks and recreation ==
Leichhardt Park, which includes the Leichhardt Park Aquatic Centre was originally part of Leichhardt, as was Leichhardt Oval. the home of the Balmain Tigers, who are now represented in a joint venture by Wests Tigers, after Balmain formed a 50/50 joint venture with the Wests Magpies. As part of the 50/50 joint venture, the Wests Tigers play 6 of their 12 home games every season at Leichhardt Oval.

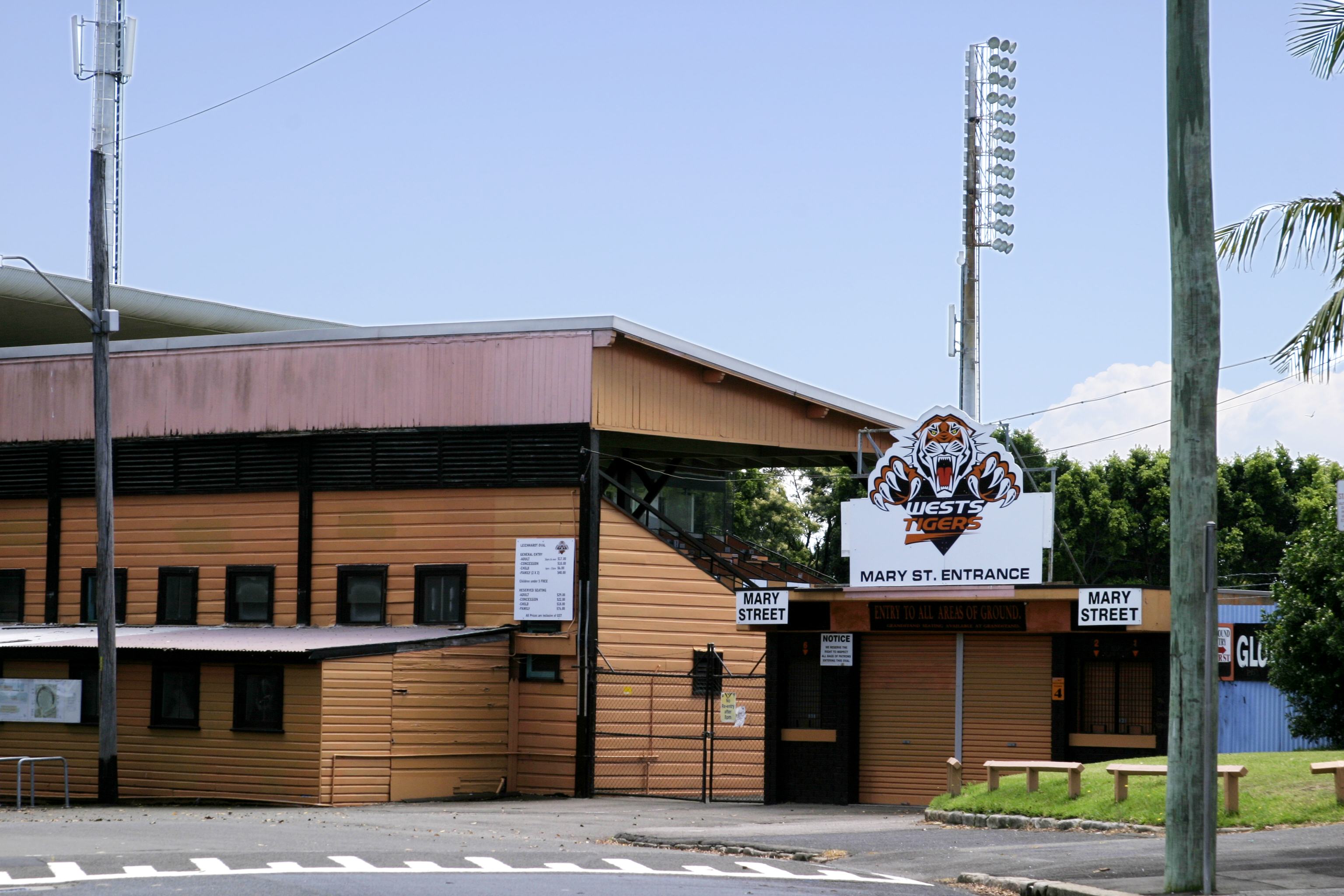
Leichhardt Oval, Mary Street

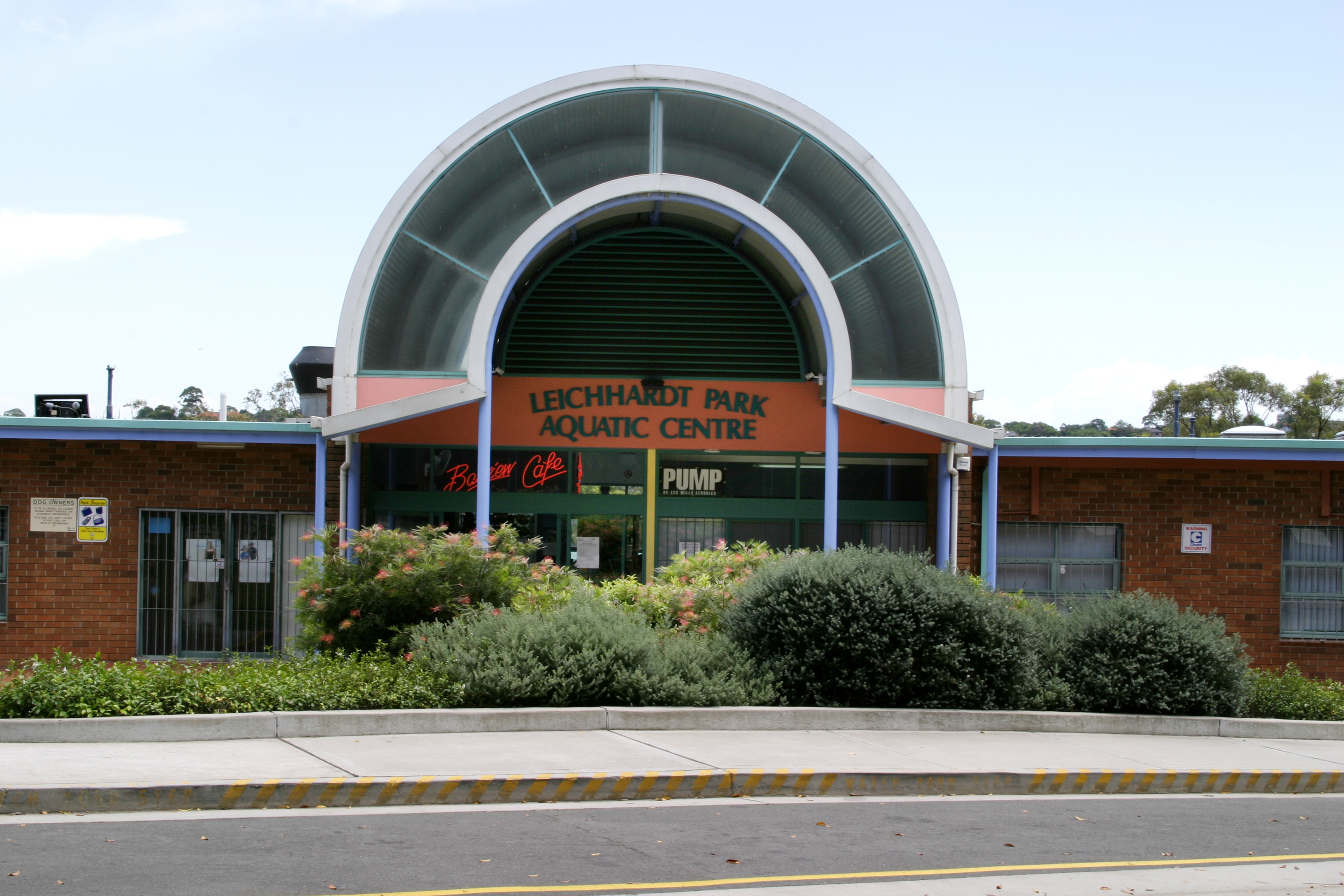
Leichhardt Park Aquatic Centre

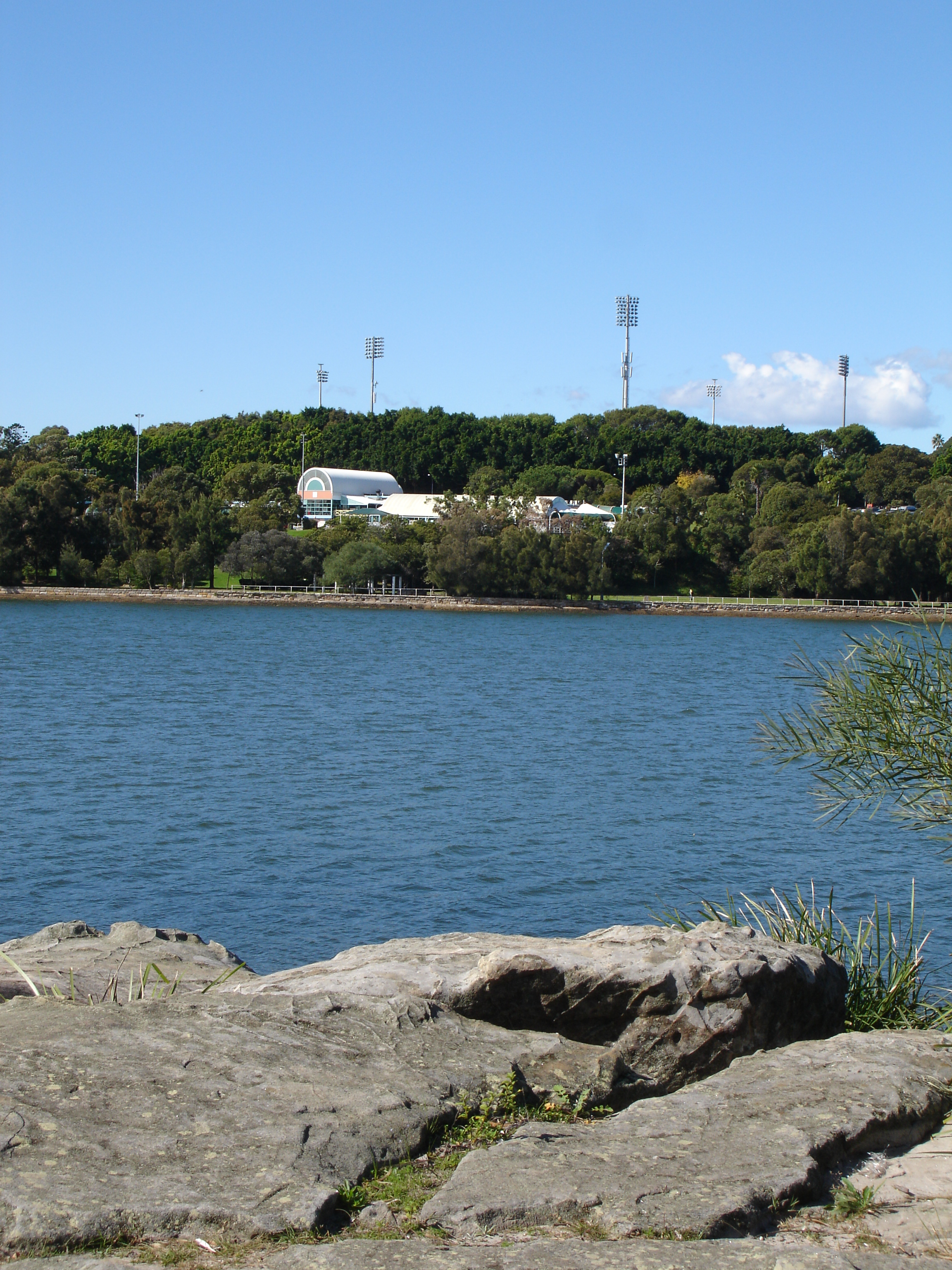
Leichhardt Park Aquatic Centre from Rodd Point

== Notable residents ==
- Leslie John Hawkins, one of the designers of the Australian flag
