= Haberfield, New South Wales =

Coordinates: 33°53′00″S 151°08′30″E

Haberfield
- Suburb
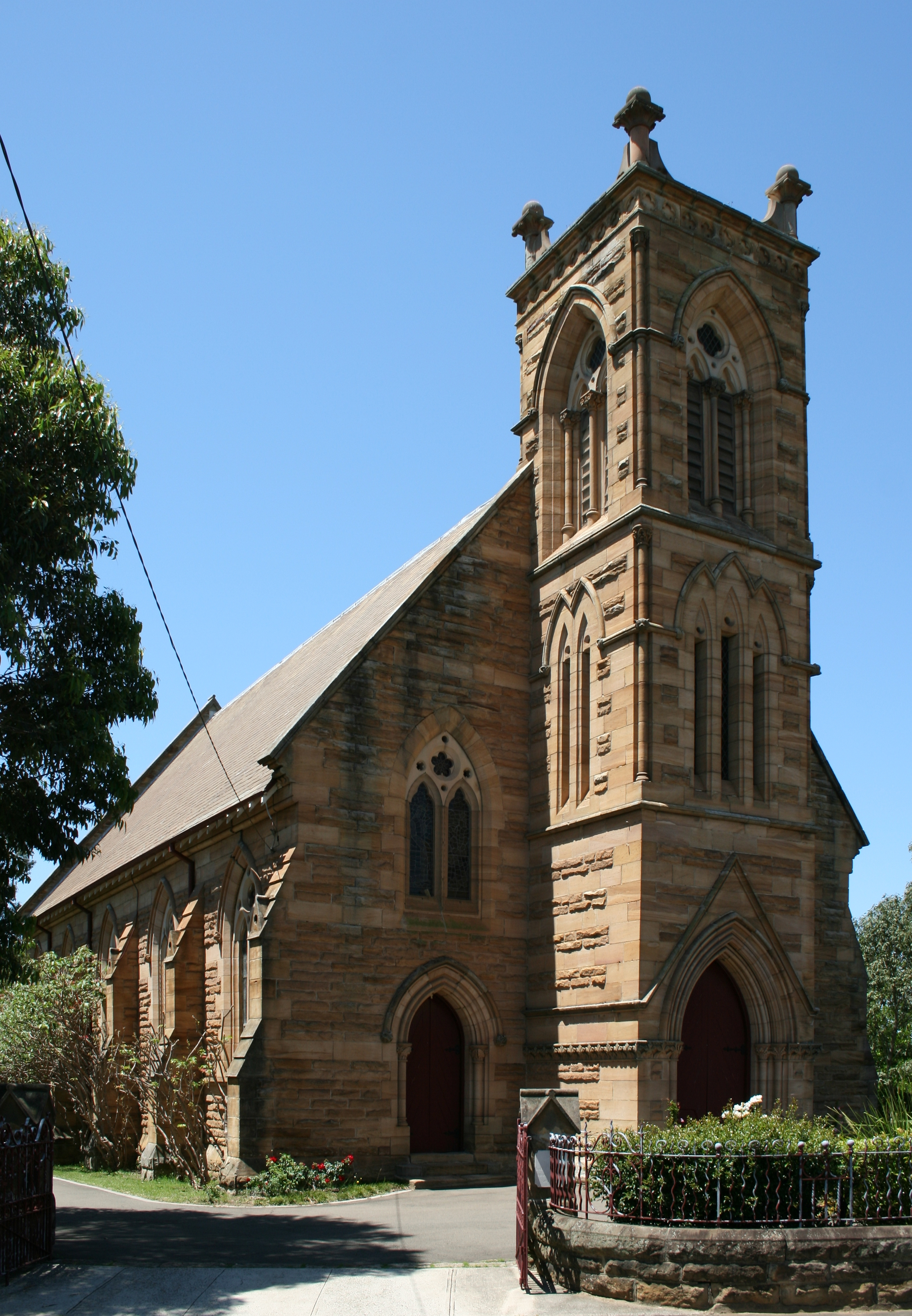
- St David's Uniting Church
- Interactive map of Haberfield
- Country: Australia
- State: New South Wales
- City: Sydney
- LGA: Inner West Council
- Location: 6.4 km (4.0 mi) west of Sydney CBD

Government
  - State electorate: Summer Hill
  - Federal division: Grayndler

Area
  - Total: 2.39 km^{2} (0.92 sq mi)
- Elevation: 21 m (69 ft)

Population
  - Total: 6,480 (2021 census)
  - Density: 2,711/km^{2} (7,022/sq mi)
- Postcode: 2045
Suburbs around Haberfield
| Five Dock | Rodd Point | Lilyfield |
| Croydon | Haberfield | Leichhardt |
| Ashfield | Summer Hill | Lewisham |

Haberfield is a suburb in the Inner West of Sydney, in the state of New South Wales, Australia. It is located 6.5 kilometres west of the Sydney central business district in the local government area of the Inner West Council.

The suburb sits south of Iron Cove, which is part of Sydney Harbour. It is bounded to the east by the Hawthorne Canal, to the northwest by the Iron Cove Creek canal and to the southwest by Parramatta Road. Its high street is Ramsay Street. The point of land that faces Iron Cove, Dobroyd Point, is a historical locality of Sydney. Haberfield is dubbed "the garden suburb" and retains its well-kept parks, tree-lined streets and fine Federation-era houses with immaculate gardens. The entire suburb is heritage-listed. It predates the creation of garden suburbs in Britain, such as present-day Letchworth and Hampstead. The suburb has also been known for its Italian diaspora.

== History ==
Haberfield was named by early landholder Richard Stanton, after the financial benefactor of his wife's family, Lord Haberfield. Ms. Stanton's maiden name was Nichols.

=== Aboriginal prehistory ===
The area which comprises Haberfield was part of the broader area in which lived people from the Darug tribe known variously as the Wangals or Cadigals from the Eora nation. The modern-day Hawthorne Canal is believed to be the border between these two tribes. There is no specific evidence of indigenous settlement in the area. However, the area that is now Haberfield was one of the last areas in the inner-west to be developed and so, in the late 19th century, it again became a home to local kooris.

=== European settlement ===
Nicholas Bayly, a soldier, received the first land grant in the area in 1803 but sold it two years later to Simeon Lord who called it Dobroyde Estate. Lord gave the land to his daughter Sarah Ann and her new husband David Ramsay as a wedding present in 1825 and it stayed in the hands of the Ramsay family until the end of the century. The Ramsays developed orchards in the area and built a number of fine houses for various members of the family, including Yasmar (Ramsay spelt backwards), and St David's Presbyterian church, which was opened in 1869 with Prince Alfred, Duke of Edinburgh in attendance. They also created four of the suburb's current streets: Ramsay Street, Dalhousie Street (named after the Ramsay's historic home in Scotland), Boomerang Street and Waratah Street.

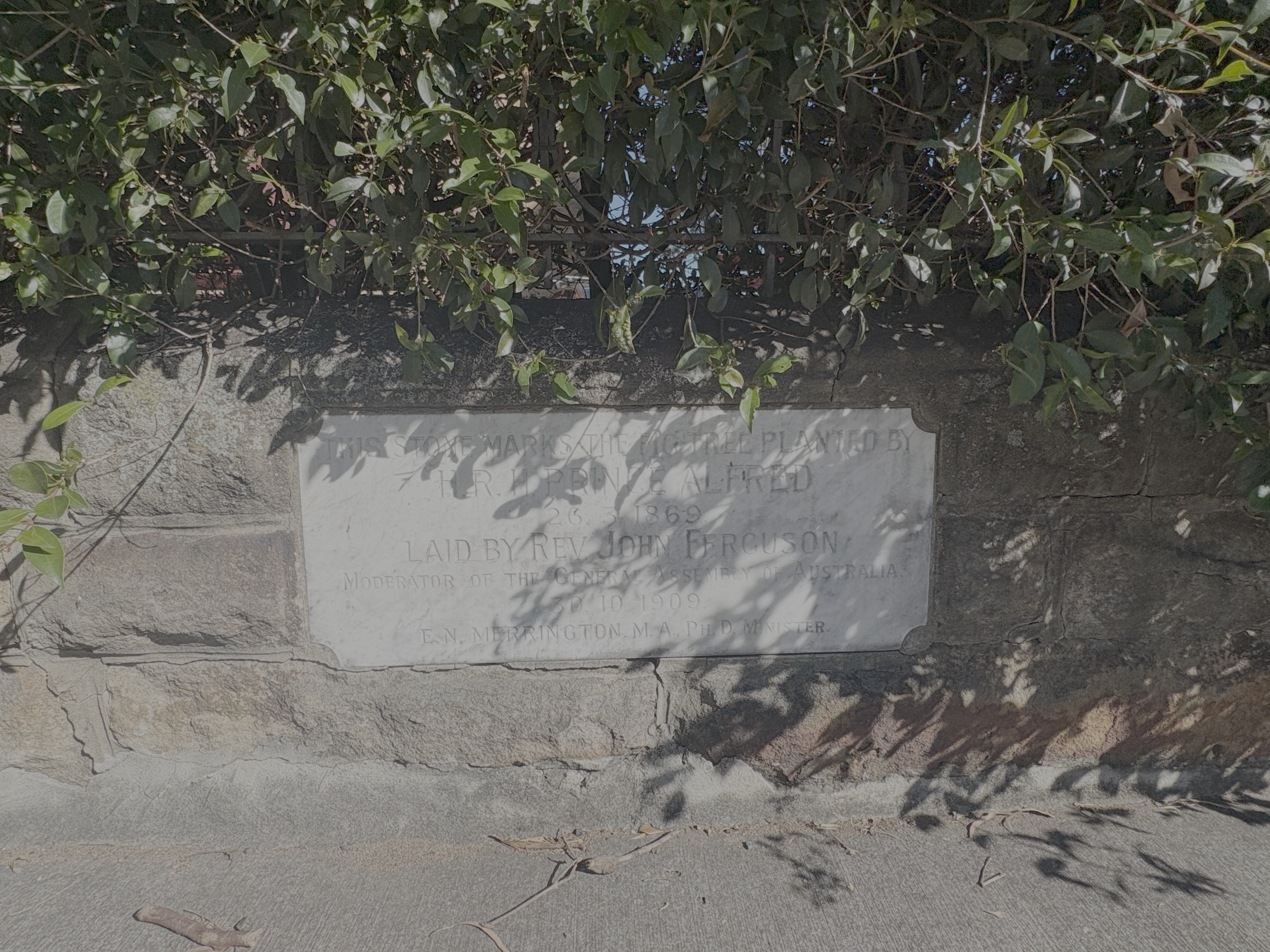
Plaque at St. David's Church, commemorating a fig tree planted by Prince Alfred upon its opening in 1869

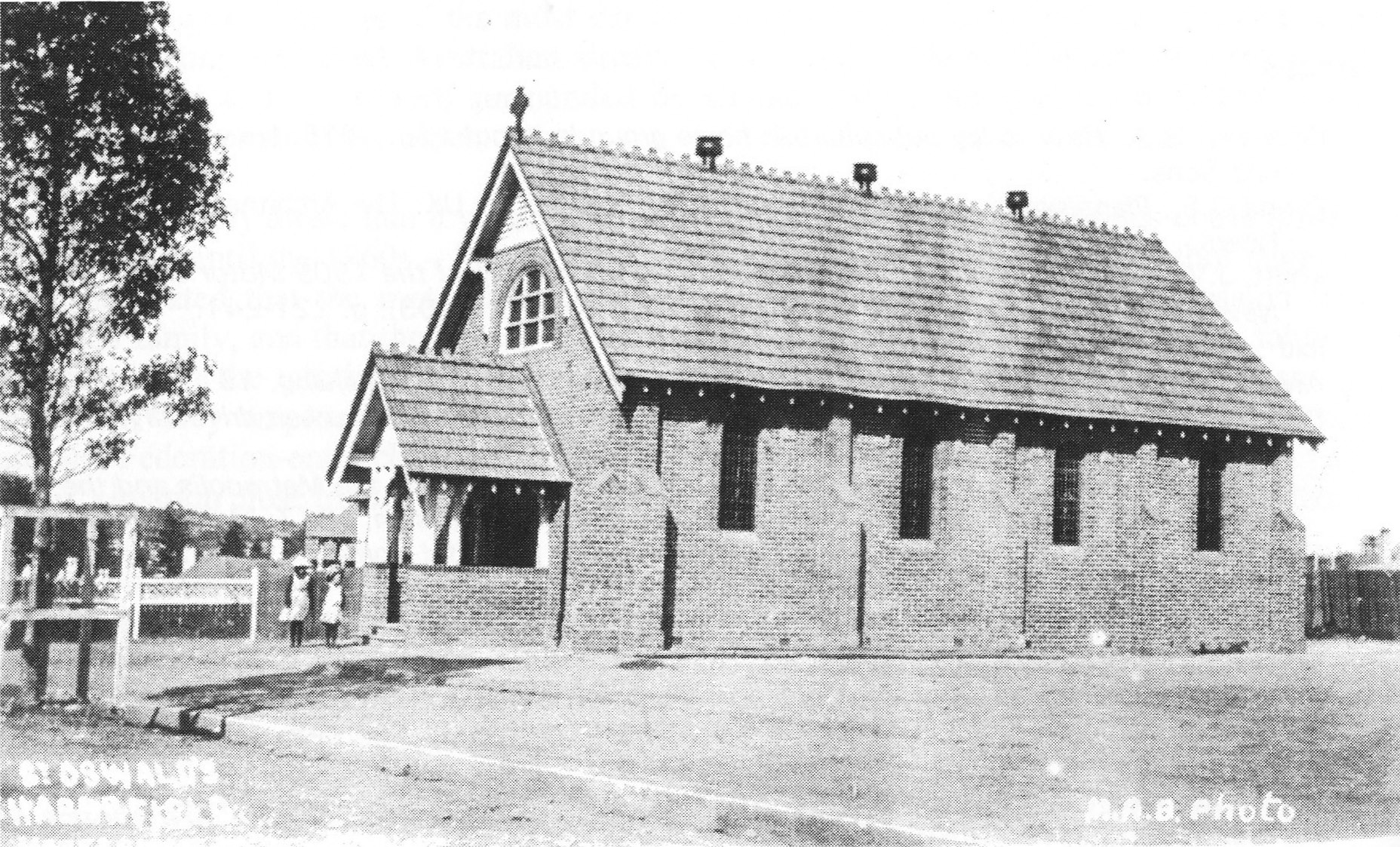
The nave of St Oswald's was built soon after subdivision of the suburb, and the Anglican parish divided from that of St John's Ashfield.

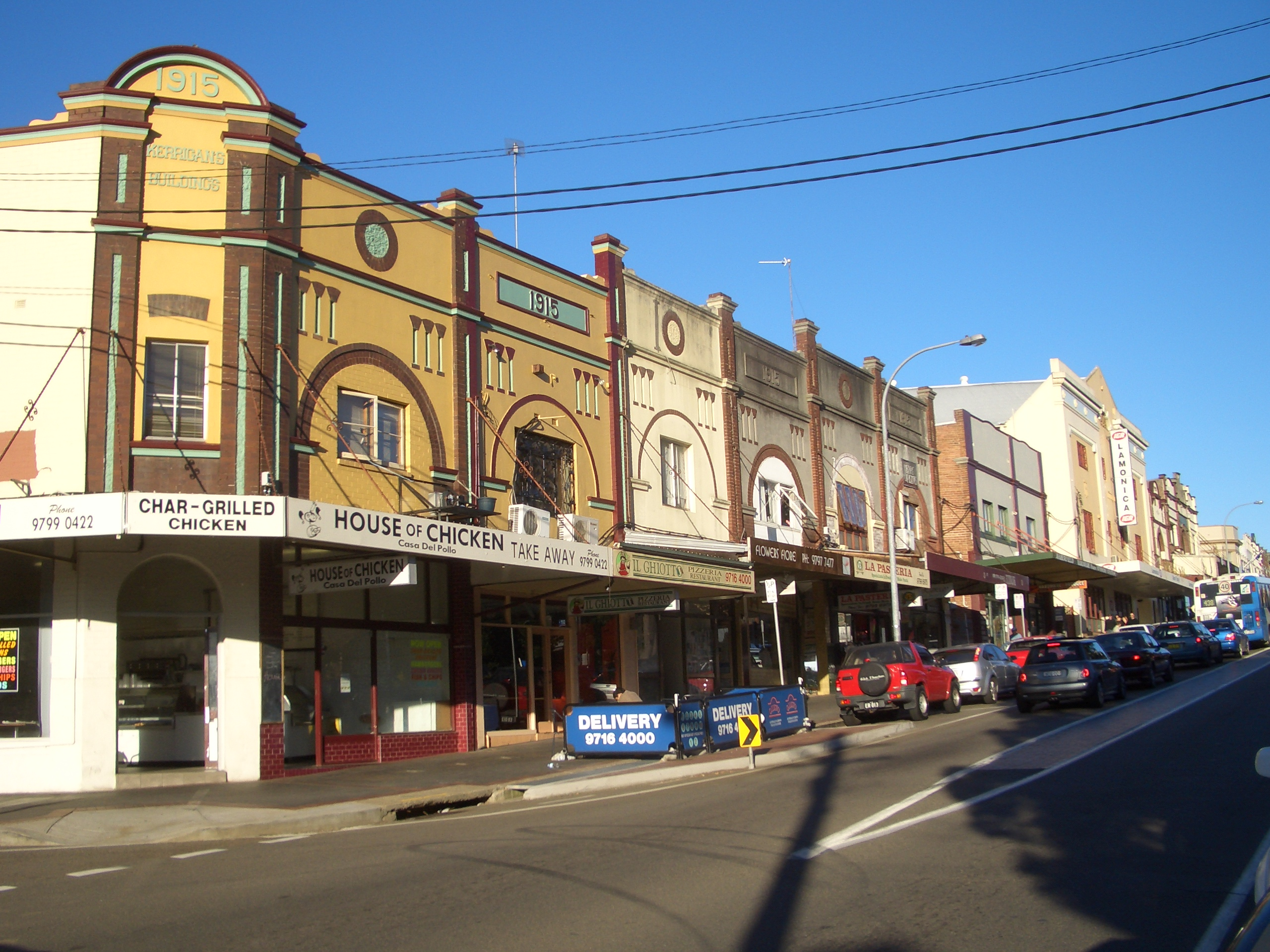
Ramsay Street, Haberfield

In 1901, landholder Richard Stanton bought 50 acres (200,000 m^{2}) from two Ramsay children and subdivided the area to create a garden suburb. Sydney had recently suffered outbreaks of the bubonic plague in overcrowded parts of the inner city and the garden suburb movement was a response to that, encouraging fresh air. He also claimed the development to be "slumless, laneless and publess". The houses were designed by the architectural firm Spencer, Stansfield and Wormald. Stanton named the suburb 'Haberfield', after the English branch of his family. The fact that the development started in 1901 and a number of the early streets were named after prominent federal politicians has led to the suburb also being known as 'The Federation Suburb'.

=== Heritage ===
The majority of houses in Haberfield are protected under a heritage order, which is the main reason why so many original Victorian and Federation houses still exist in the area. Renovations and additions to both houses and properties must follow strict guidelines ensuring they stay true to the era's style. Some examples of rules include: banning the addition of second storeys unless in the existing roof space, banning the demolishing of any protected houses, ensuring a 50:50 ratio of 'hard surface' to 'soft surface' on the property, ensuring house exteriors are painted in federation colours. Houses must also have a roof consisting of terracotta or slate tiles.

One notable landmark is Yasmar, at 185 Parramatta Road. Formerly known as Yasmar Hostel, this building was built circa 1870 of dressed stone, with a verandah and iron columns. It also features French windows and extensive cedar joinery, and is set in a lush garden. It was later part of Yasmar Juvenile Centre and is listed on the Register of the National Estate.

Haberfield has a heritage association to help residents maintain their heritage properties.

=== 21st century ===
A proposal was made by McDonald's to build a drive-through outlet on Parramatta Road in Haberfield in 2011. This was fiercely opposed by a group of local residents who wanted to preserve the suburb's "cultural and architectural heritage." The development application was rejected by Ashfield Council in 2009, however McDonald's appealed to the Land and Environment Court of New South Wales and the appeal was upheld in 2011, but with modifications to the proposed building. Following the opening of the McDonald's restaurant in Haberfield, there were complaints about odours coming from the site in 2012 and 2013.

== Heritage listings ==
Haberfield has a number of heritage-listed sites, including:

- 51- 53 Dalhousie Street: St David's Uniting Church
- 16 Deakin Avenue: Derrylyn
- 185 Parramatta Road: Yasmar
- 5 Rogers Avenue: The Bunyas
- 11 St Davids Road: St. David's Road Depot

== Schools ==
Haberfield has three primary schools. Two of the schools are state run: Haberfield Public School on the corner of Bland Street Denman avenue and Dobroyd Point Public School on Waratah Street. The third is the St Joan of Arc Catholic School on Dalhousie Street opposite St Joan of Arc Church.

== Transport ==
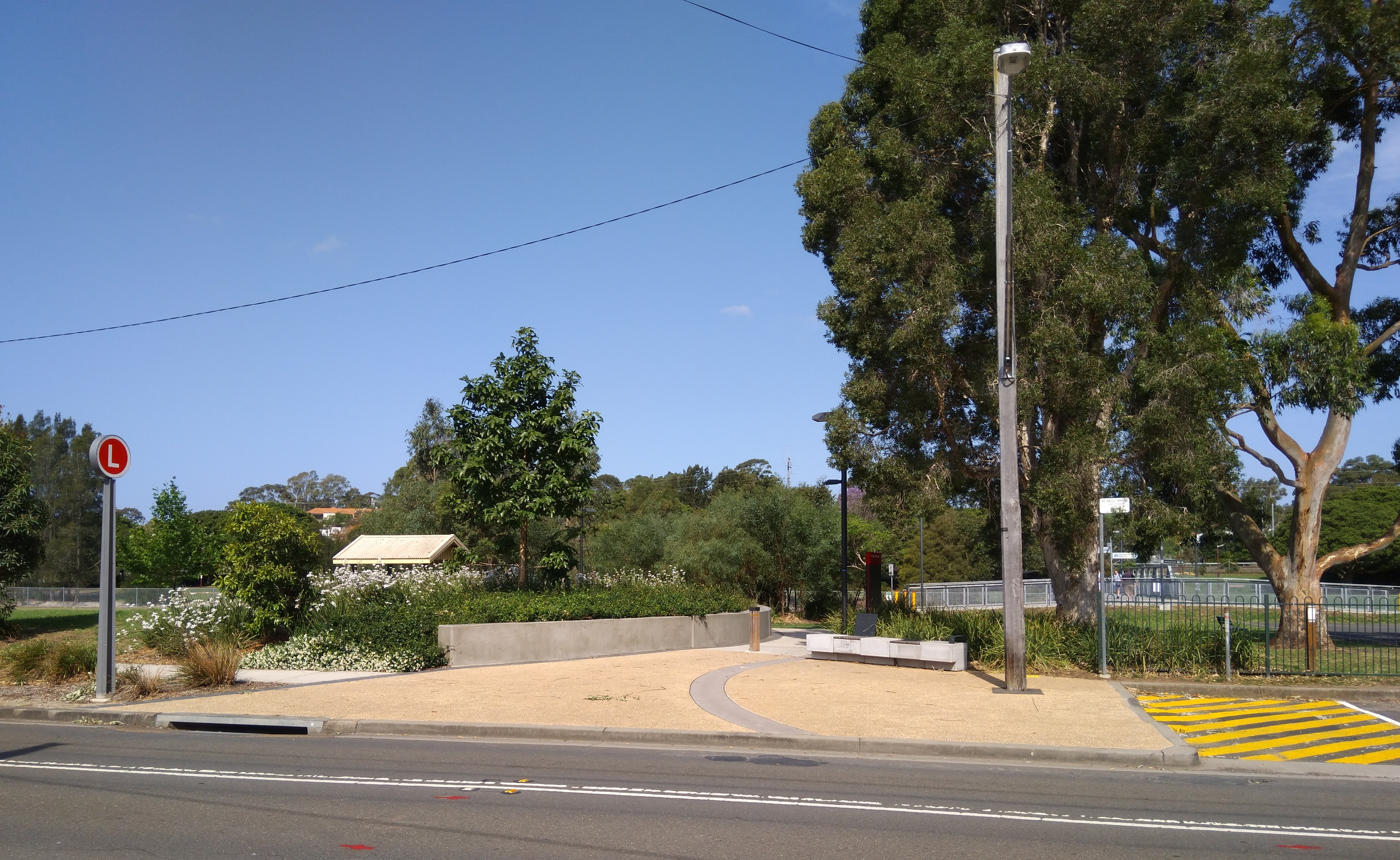
Entrance to Hawthorne station, part of the Inner West Light Rail line, on Hawthorne Parade

The Inner West Light Rail, running along the former Rozelle–Darling Harbour Goods Line, skirts the suburb's eastern border with Leichhardt. Marion station, elevated on an embankment, provides bus connections towards Rodd Point, Abbotsford and Mortlake via Ramsay Street. Hawthorne serves the Hawthorne Canal Reserve. Both are located next to the GreenWay cycling and walking trail. To the east, the light rail offers a direct link to Pyrmont and Darling Harbour, while to the south it provides an out-of-station interchange with Lewisham railway station and a direct interchange with Dulwich Hill railway station.

Bus routes along Ramsay Street and Parramatta Road serve the suburb. Haberfield is on the NightRide bus network.

Summer Hill railway station is close to the southern border of the suburb. Five Dock railway station on the Sydney Metro West rapid transit line will serve the neighbouring suburb of Five Dock.

Since July 2019, an interchange at Haberfield has allowed access to the M4 Motorway, which passes beneath Haberfield in tunnels constructed as part of the WestConnex project.

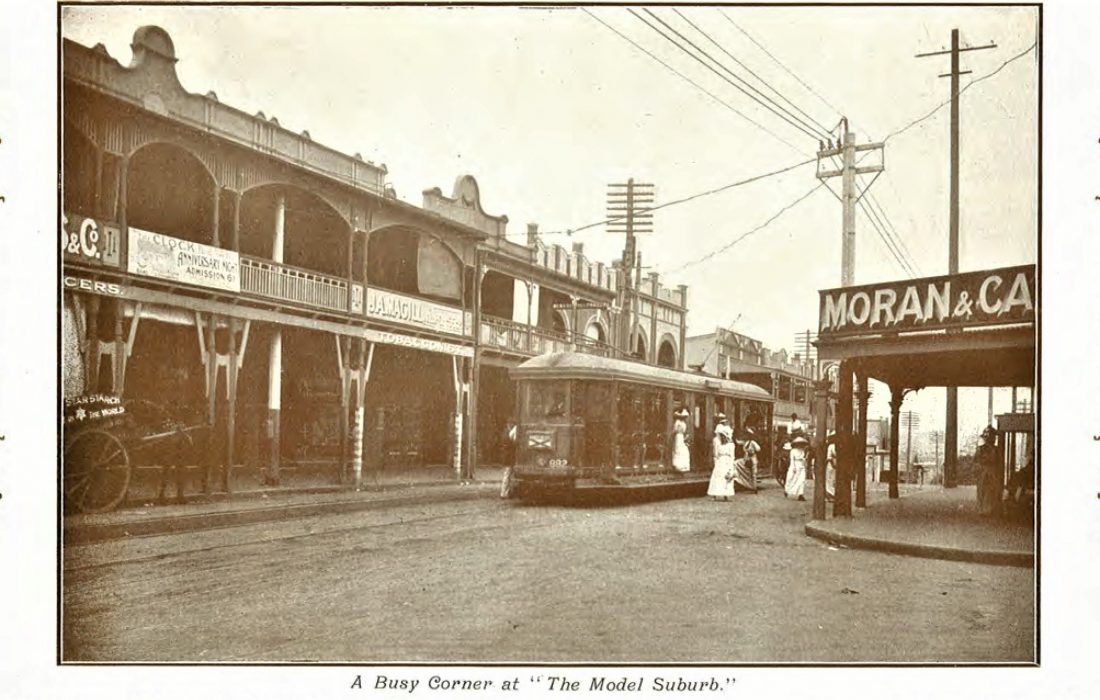
An O-class tram takes passengers at the Haberfield shops

Haberfield was historically served by trams.

== Demographics ==
At the 2021 census, there were 6,480 residents in Haberfield. The population was older than average, with a median age of 46 and with 22.2% of people aged 65 and over. 69.8% of people were born in Australia. The next most common countries of birth were Italy (10.6%) and England (3.0%). The most common responses for religion in the census were Catholic (44.1%) and No Religion (32.5%). 70.7% of people spoke only English at home. Other languages spoken at home included Italian (16.1%) and Greek (2.0%). 30% of residents had declared Italian ancestry.

Haberfield's population was steady between 2006 and 2021, and the number of homes dropped from 2505 to 2388. Over the same period, median age increased from 42 to 46 and median income increased from $1291 to $2761. 17% of residents rent their home, which is less than half the average of Greater Sydney.

== Notable residents ==
The following people were either born in, or lived in, Haberfield:

- Norman Allan (1901–1977), New South Wales police commissioner from 1962 to 1972; Allan attended Haberfield Public School and was married at St. David's Church
- Bronwyn Oliver (1959–2006), sculptor
- Odette, musician who attended Haberfield Public School

== Gallery ==
=== Churches ===
Haberfield has four historical churches in Dalhousie Street: St Oswalds Anglican Church, Saint Joan of Arc Catholic Church, St Davids Uniting Church, Haberfield Baptist Church.

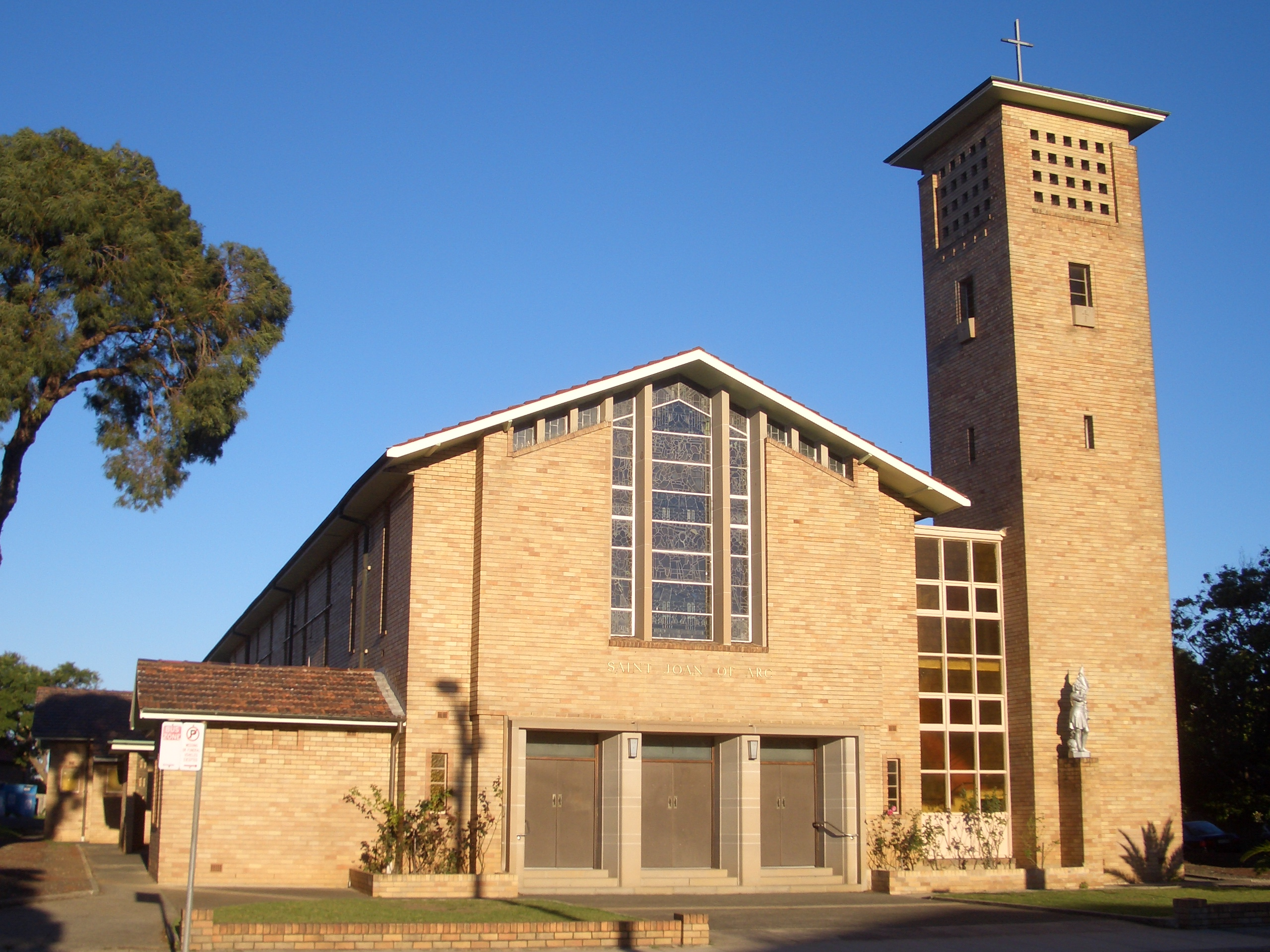
Saint Joan of Arc Catholic Church

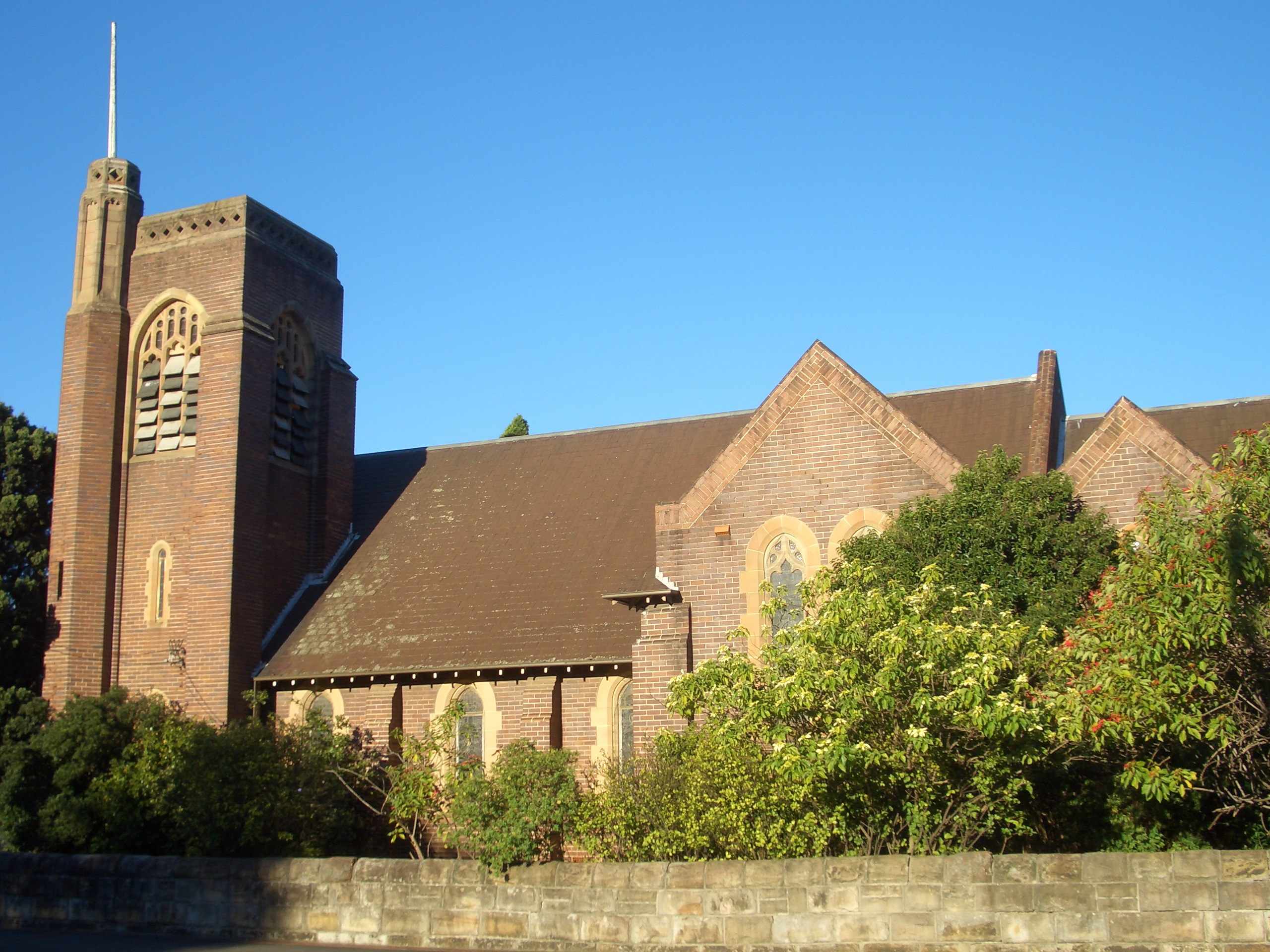
St Oswalds Anglican Church

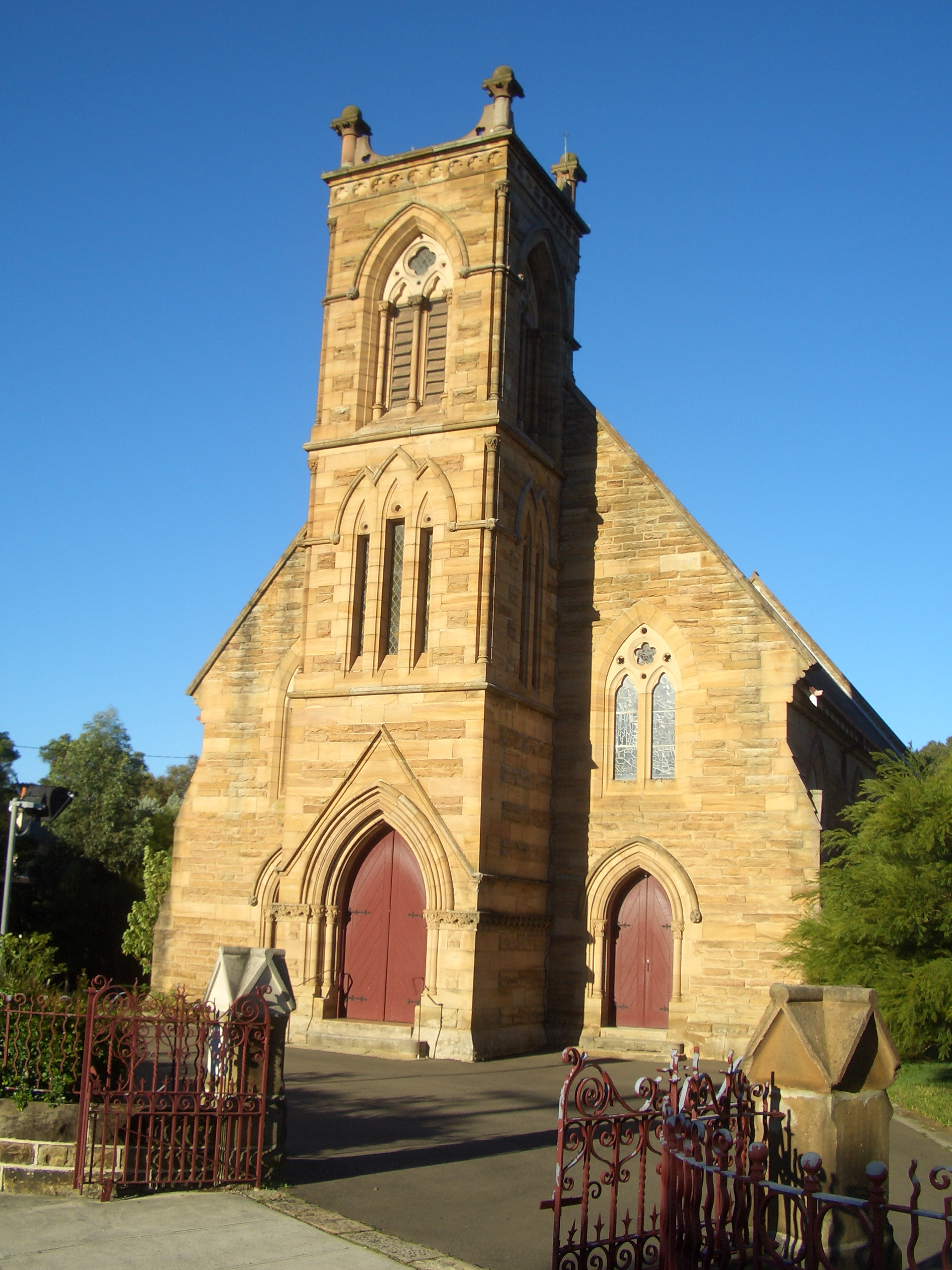
St Davids Uniting Church

=== Houses ===
About 1500 houses were constructed in this and adjoining areas to designs by architects J Spencer Stansfeld and D Wormald, to Federation or Bungalow styles.

Haberfield espoused the philosophy of the Garden Suburb with its gardens containing distinctive planting, fences, gates and curving tiled paths. Houses in Haberfield were typically 'detached' double-brick dwellings situated on their own block of land measuring 50' x 150' (15 m x 45 m). No two houses were alike, although there were many common themes throughout the suburb. The roofs were either slate or Marseilles tile. All had front verandahs. Decorative features typically used in this area include leadlight windows depicting Australian flora and fauna, Art Nouveau timber detailing and tuckpointed brickwork.

Houses listed under the NSW Heritage Act:

- Bunyas, 5 Rogers Avenue, Haberfield
- Derrylyn, 16 Deakin Avenue, Haberfield
- Yasmar, 185 Parramatta Road, Haberfield
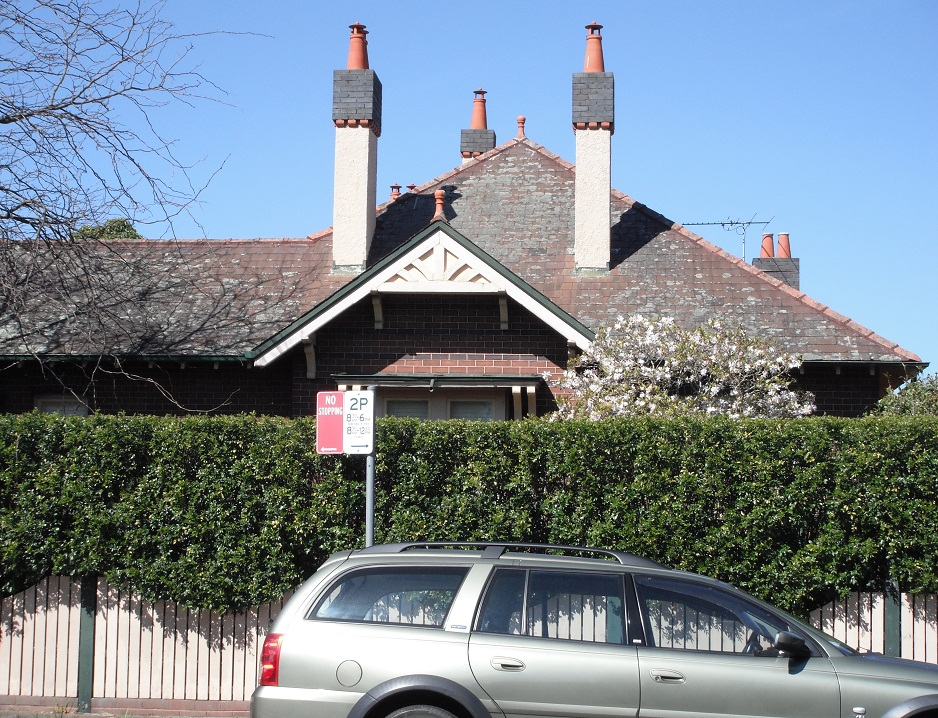
Derrylyn, 16 Deakin Avenue, Haberfield

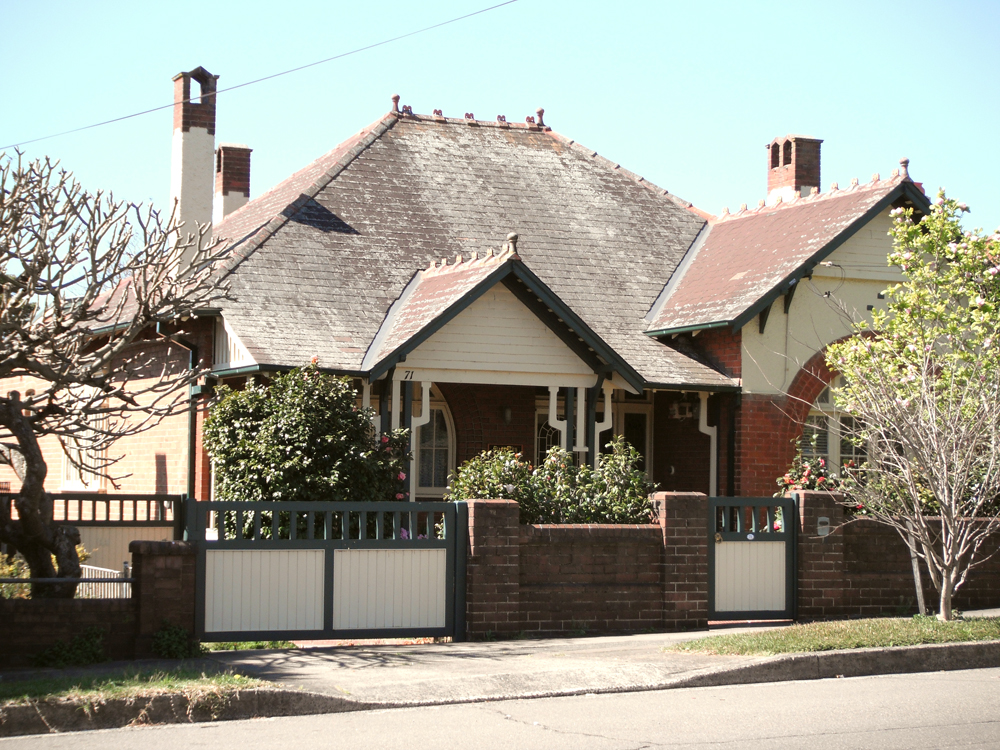
71 Ramsay Street, Haberfield

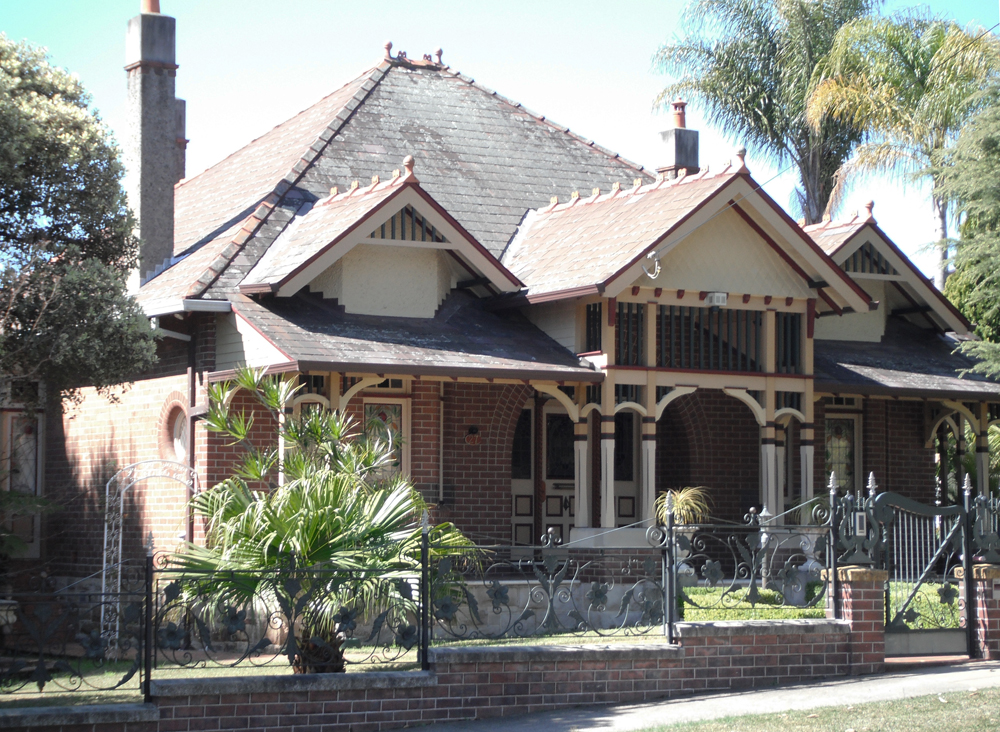
27 Stanton Road Haberfield

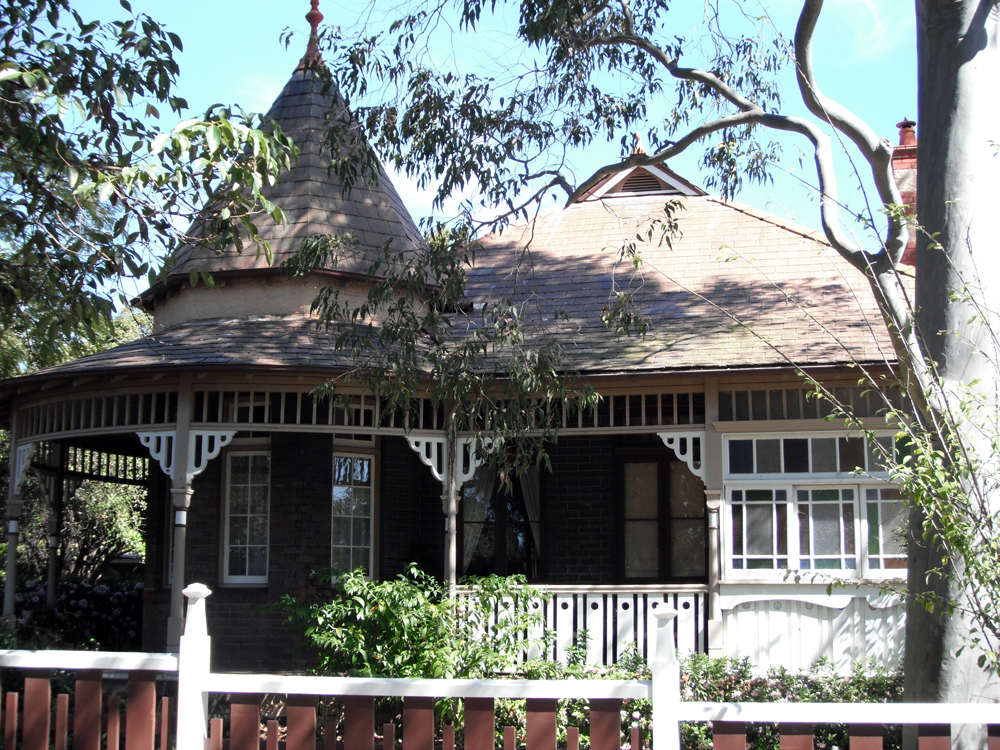
20 Stanton Road Haberfield

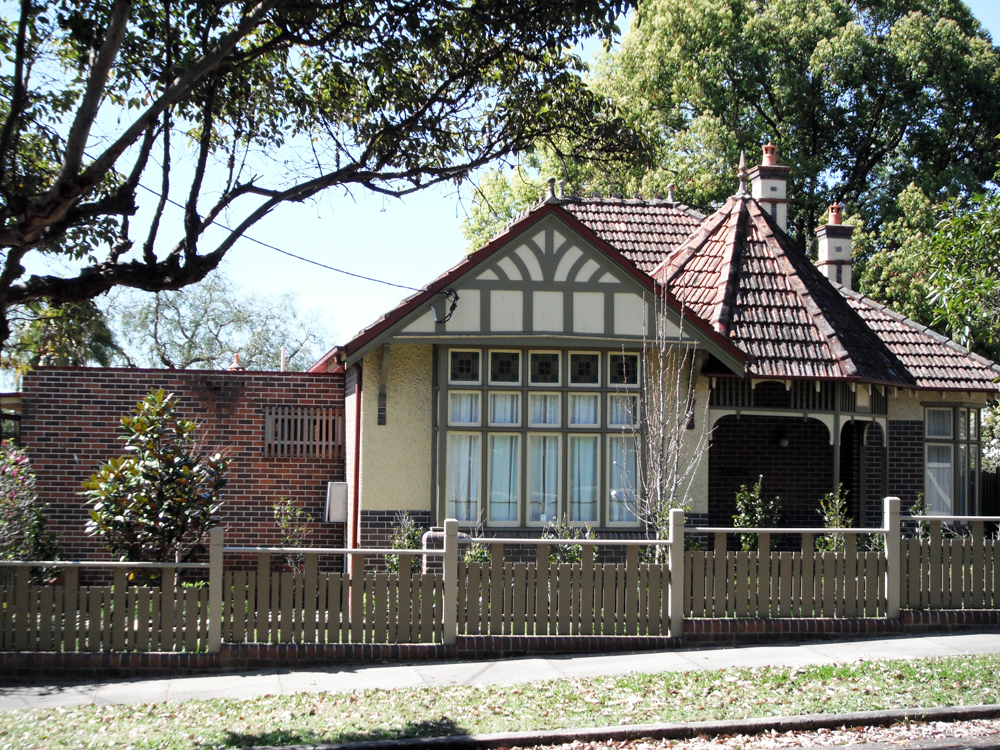
19 Stanton Road Haberfield

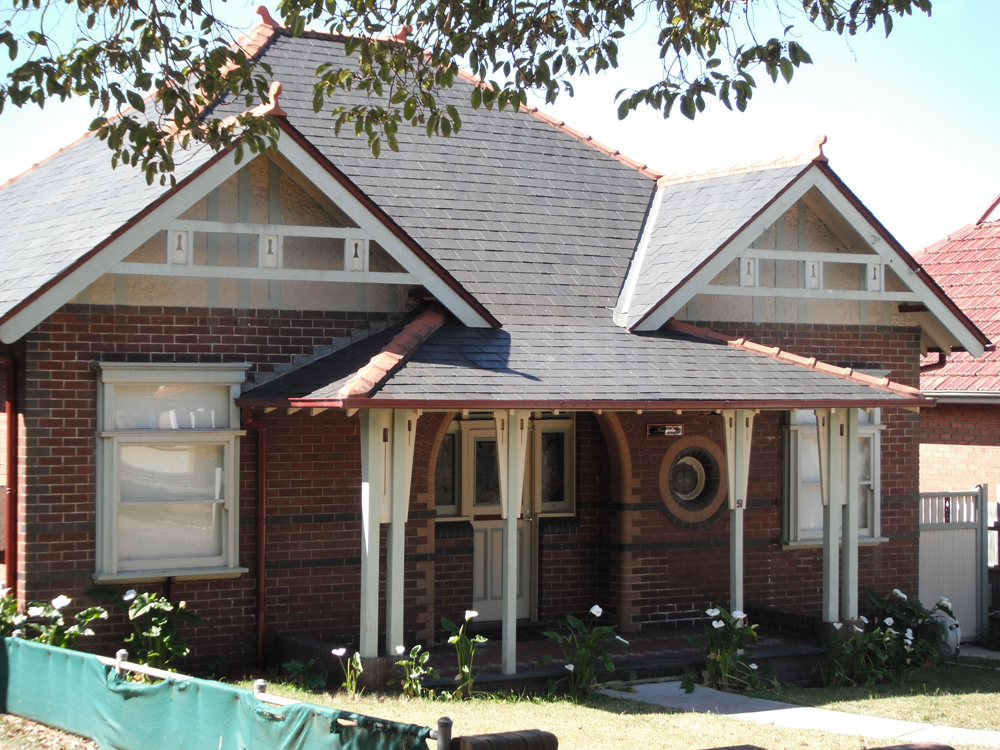
51 Stanton Road Haberfield

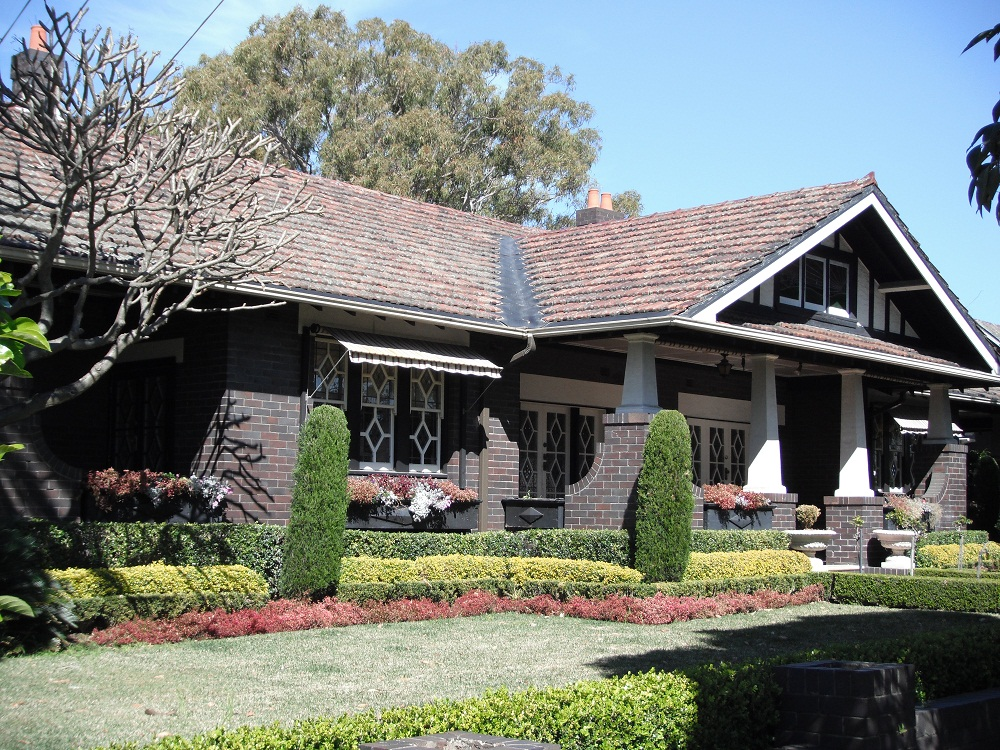
11 Rogers Avenue Haberfield

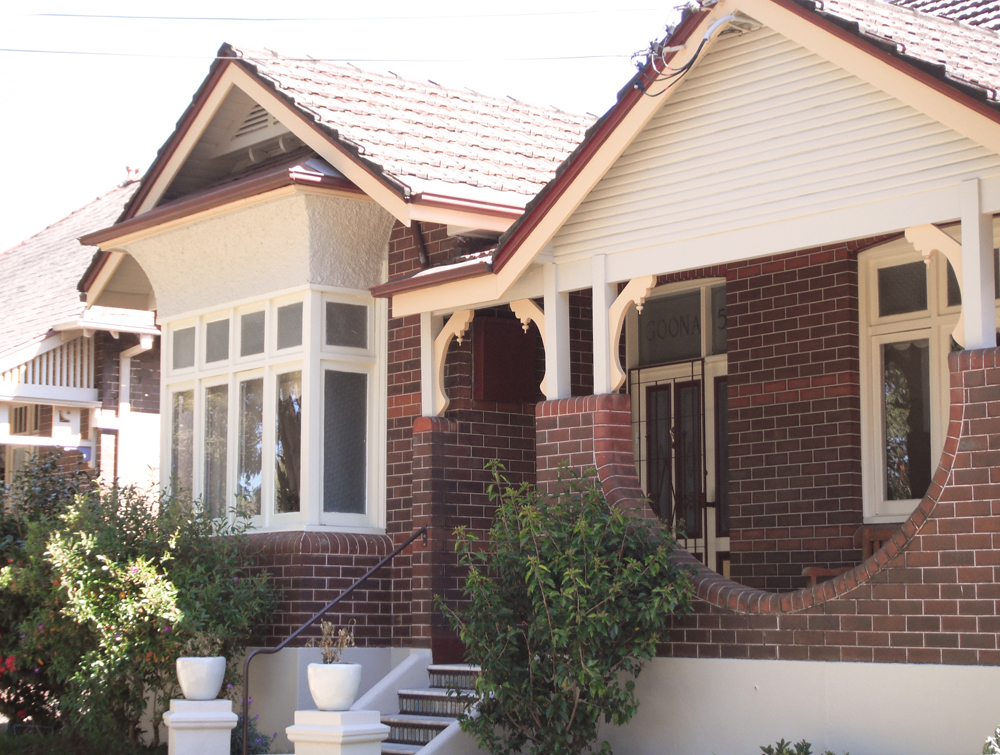
56 O'Connor Street Haberfield

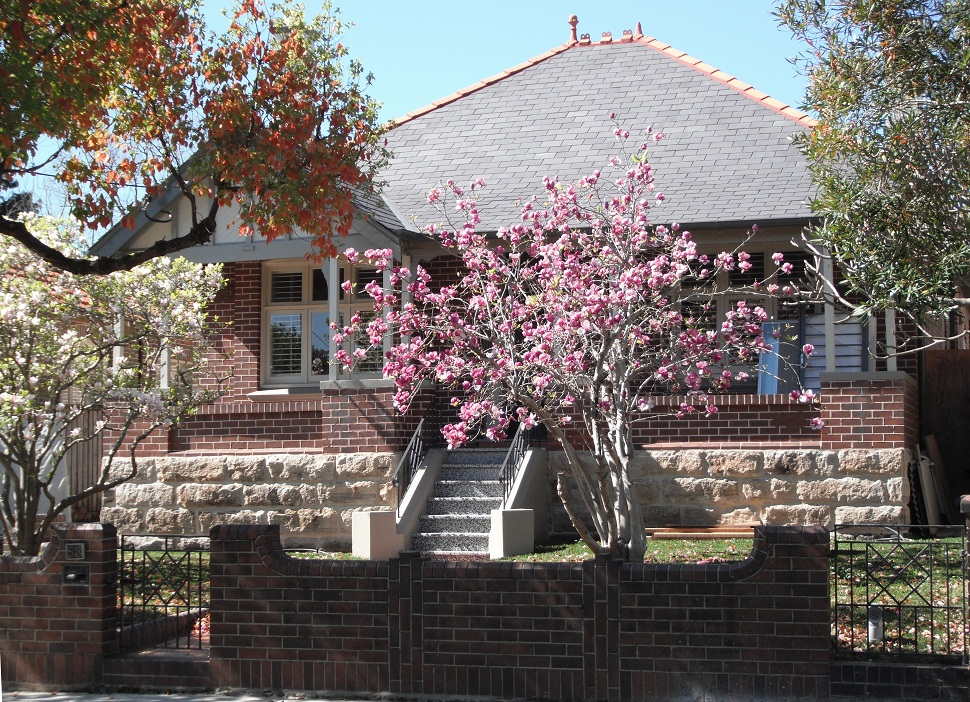
53 Dudley Street, Haberfield

=== Parks ===
Several parks lie within the suburb of Haberfield such as; Algie Park, Robson Park, Reg Cody Reserve, Hawthorne Canal and Wadim 'Bill' Jegorow Reserve

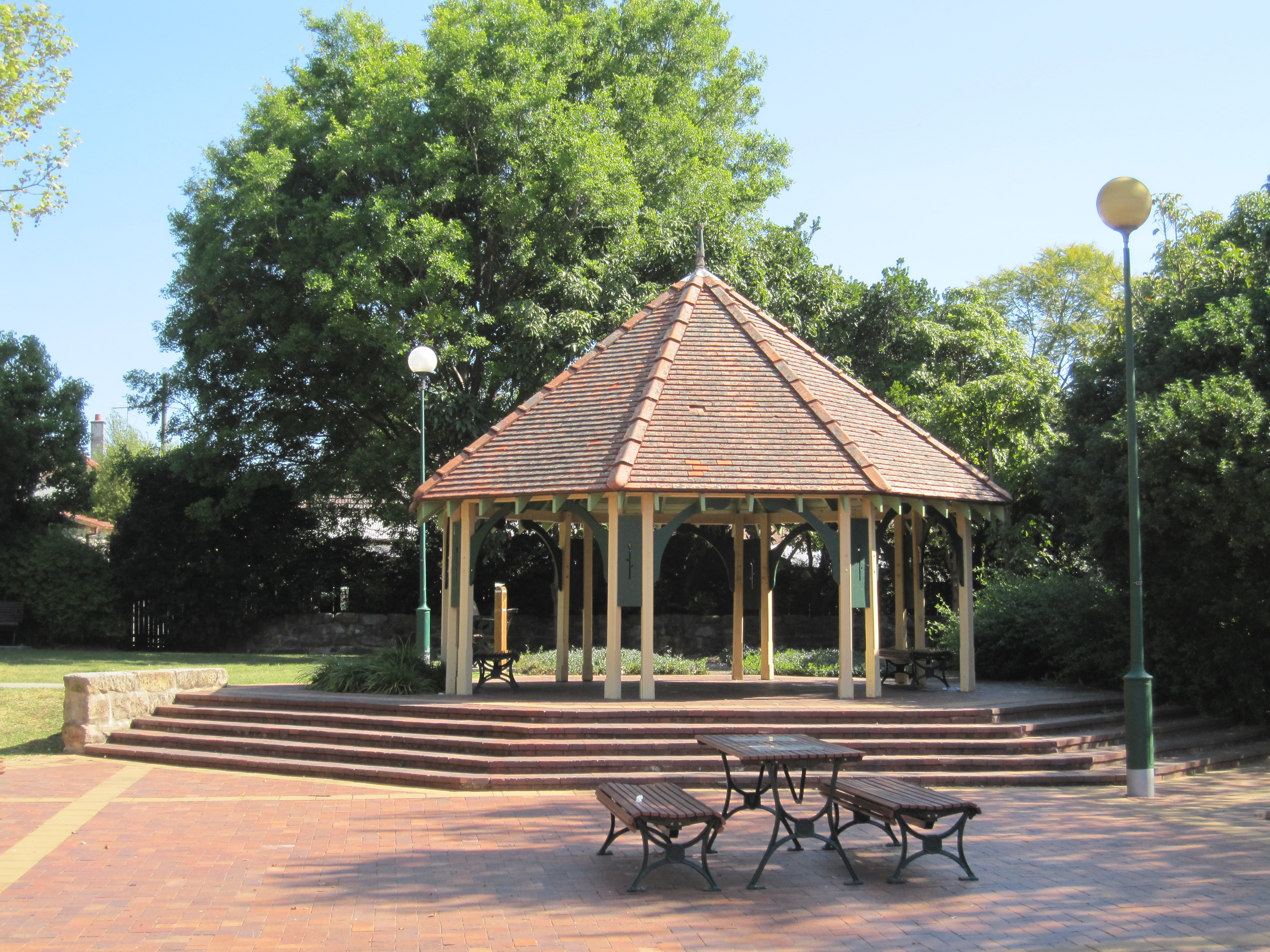
Federation Plaza

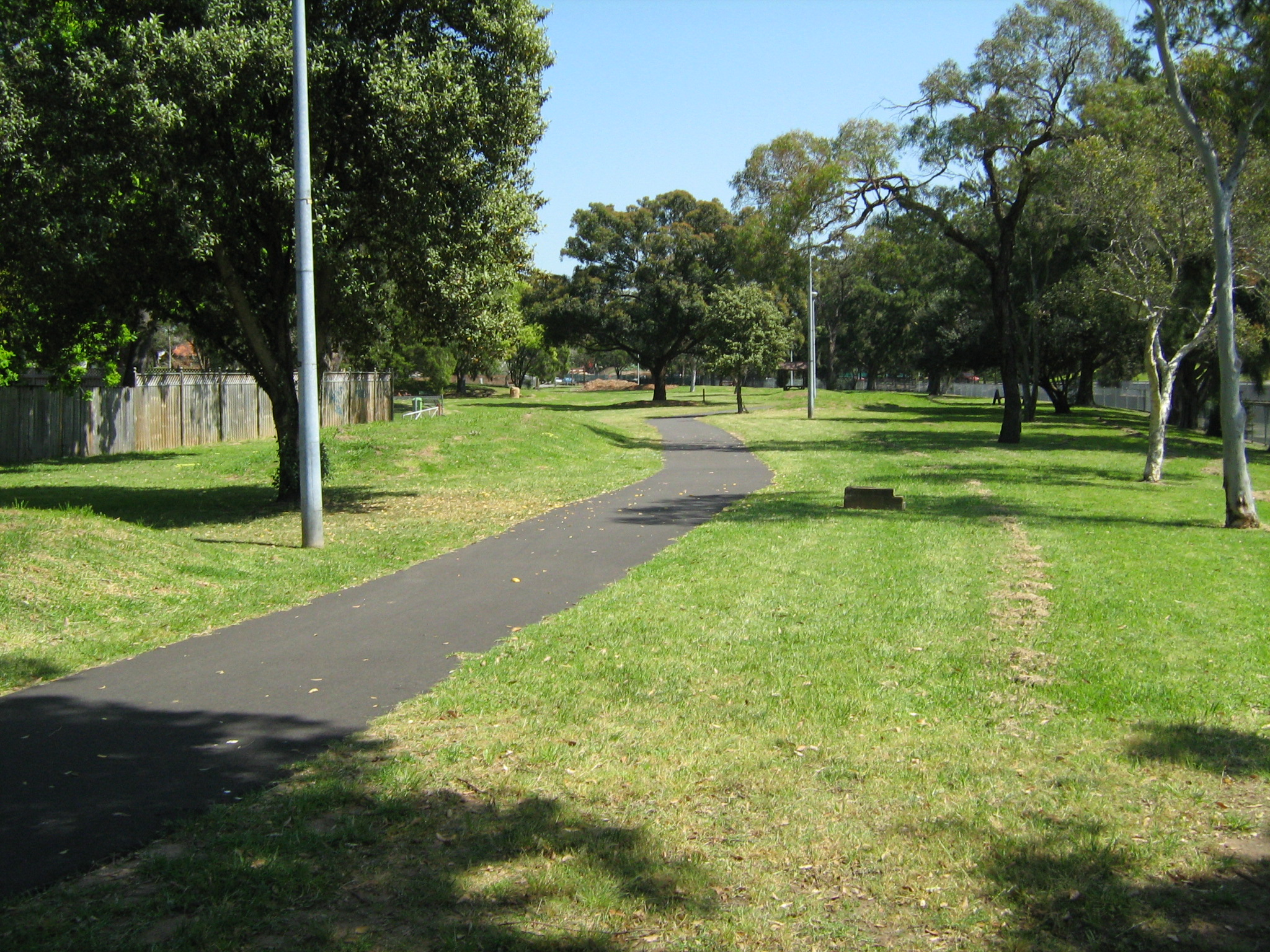
Wadim (Bill) Jegorow Reserve, Wolesely Street

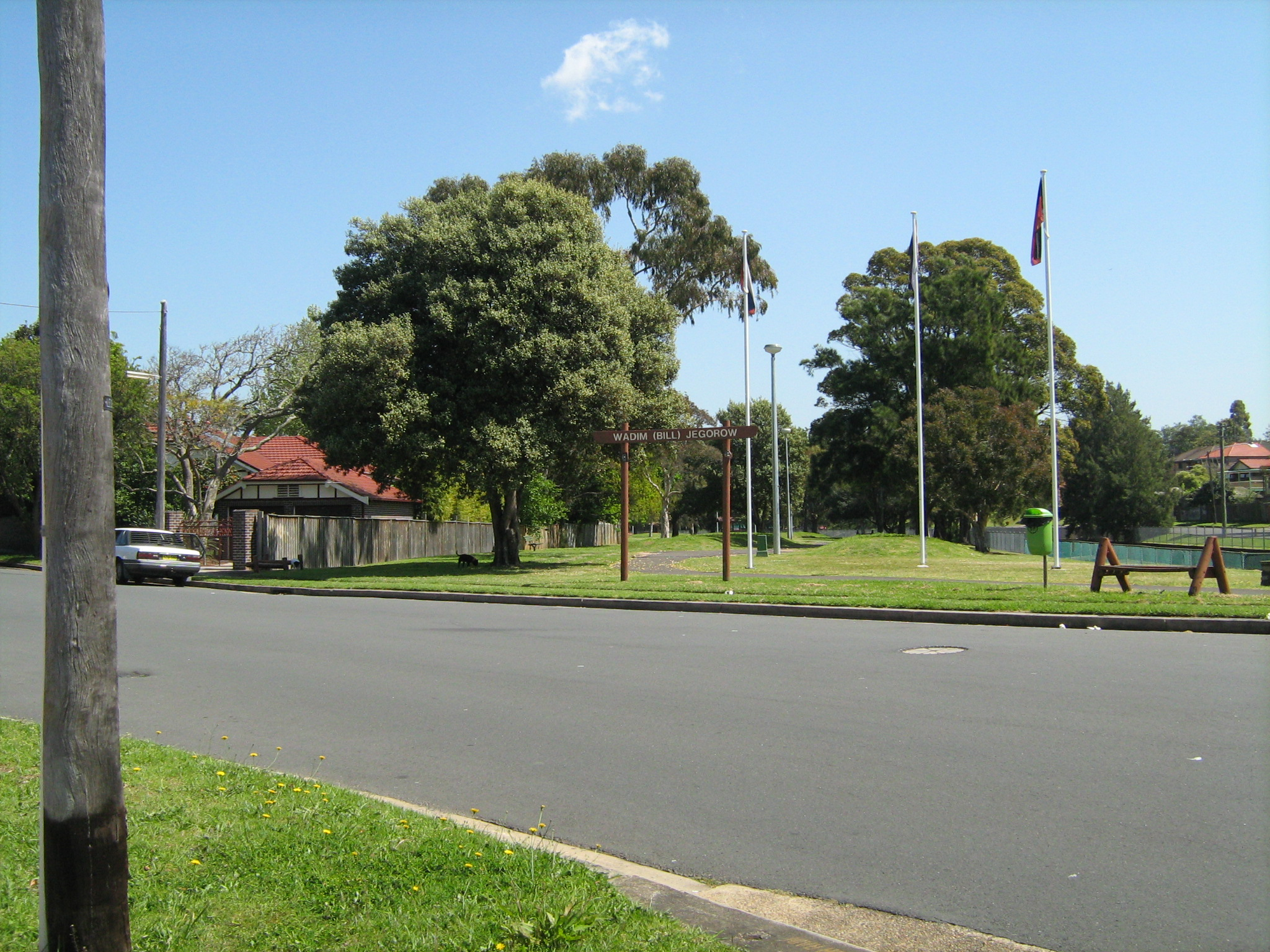
Wadim 'Bill' Jegorow Reserve at Wolesely Street, Haberfield

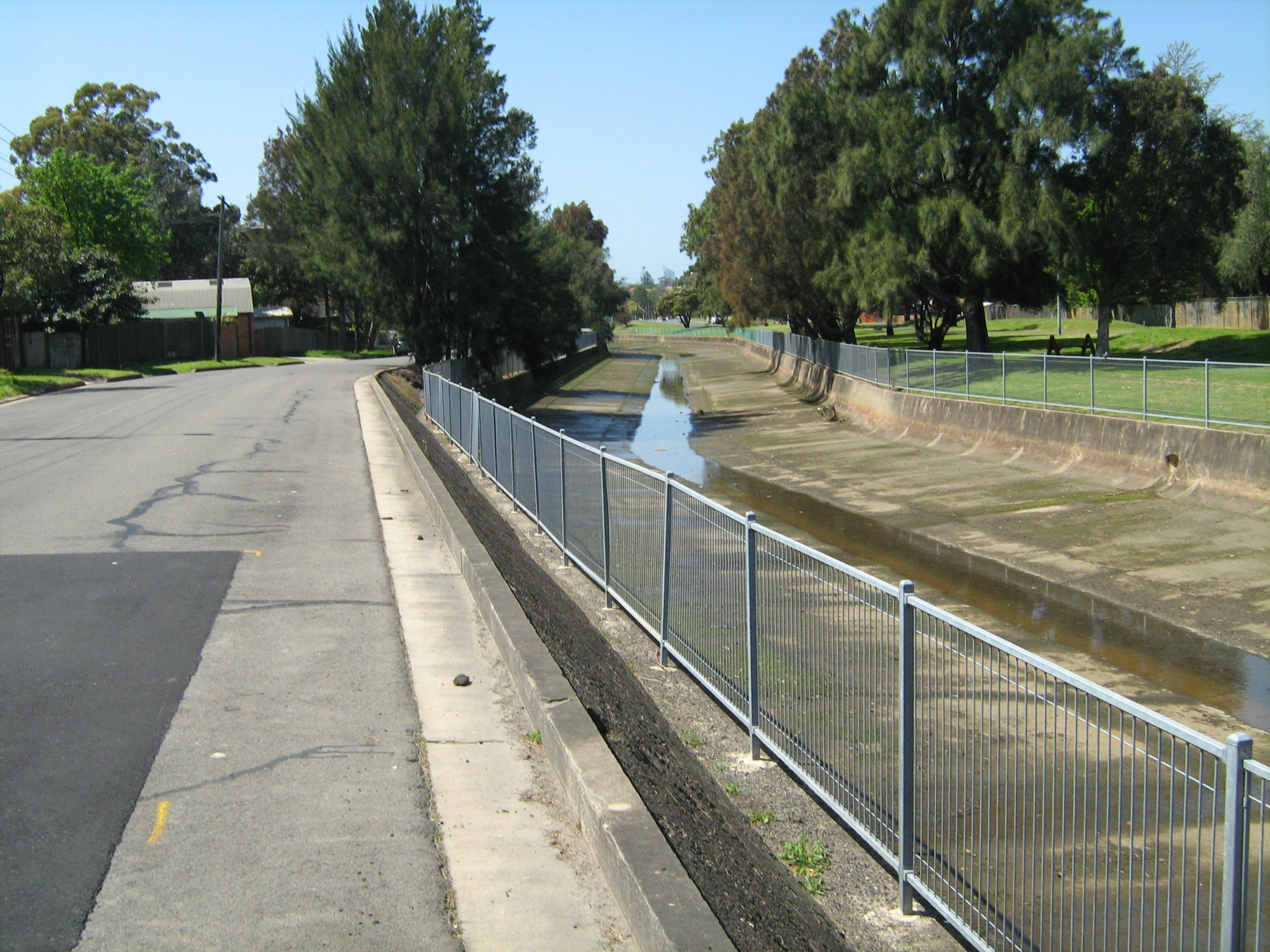
View of Iron Cove Creek with Wadim (Bill) Jegorow Reserve on the right

== See also ==
- Australian non-residential architectural styles
- List of Anglican churches in the Diocese of Sydney
