= GreenWay =

Mixed-use pathway in Sydney, New South Wales, Australia

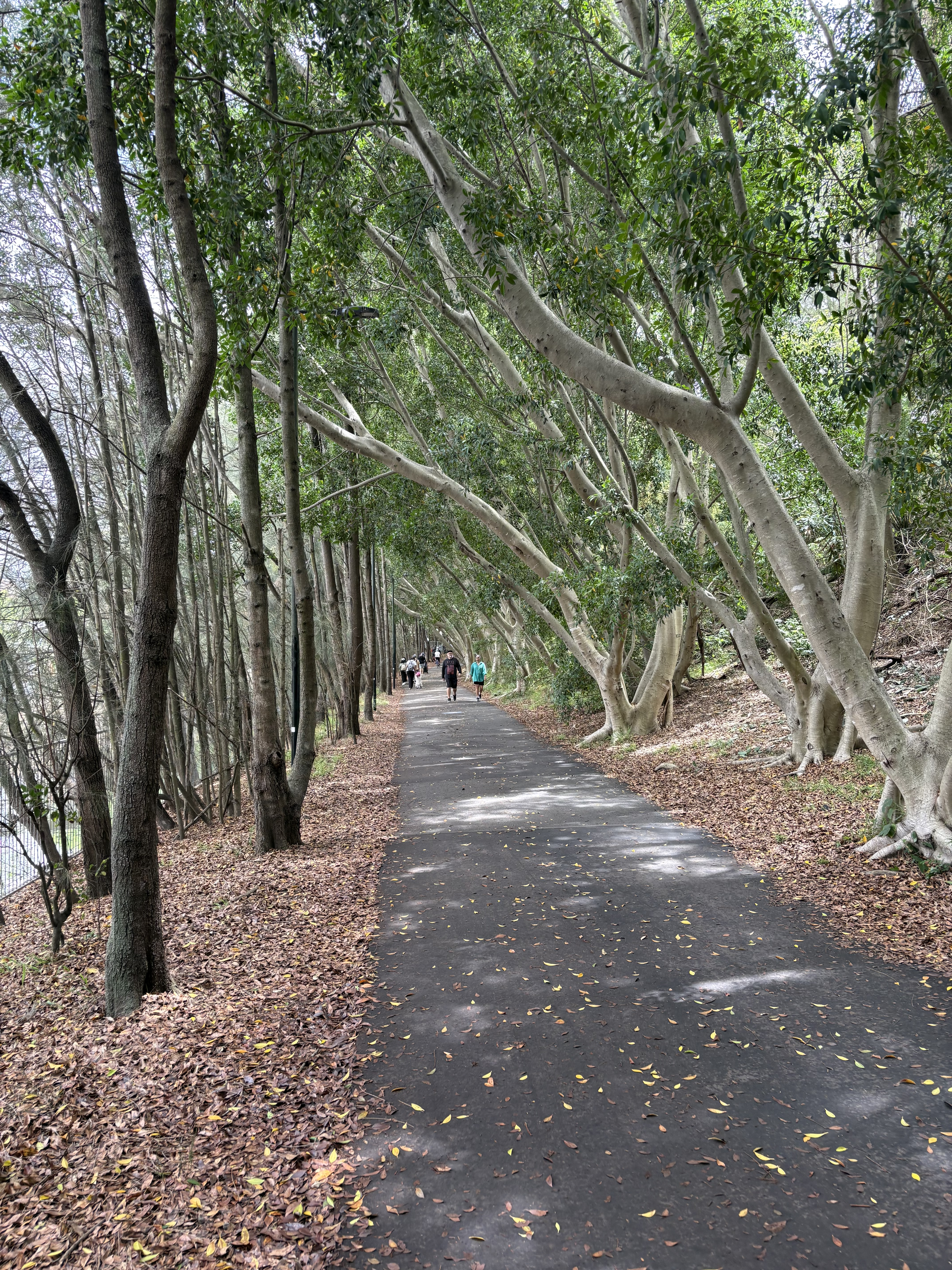
- Length: 6 km (3.7 mi)
- Location: Inner West, Sydney, New South Wales, Australia
- Began construction: November 2022
- Completed: 14 December 2025
- Trailheads: Iron Cove (north); Cooks River (south)
- Use: Walking; Cycling
- Maintainer: Inner West Council
- Website: GreenWay — Inner West Council

The GreenWay is a shared walking and cycling trail in the Inner West of Sydney, Australia. It is intended to preserve a corridor for native wildlife and plants.

The full length of the track leads from the Cooks River in Earlwood to the Parramatta River and The Bay Run in Iron Cove. It follows the alignment of the Hawthorne Canal.

For most of its length, the trail follows the alignment of the Inner West Light Rail line along seven stations from Hawthorne to Dulwich Grove, although the stations of Leichhardt North and Dulwich Hill are not far from the trailheads. The full length of the trail takes 25 minutes to cycle or 75 minutes to walk.

Because of the mixed use but lack of differentiation between a walking and cycling lane, it is suitable for most walkers and cyclists. Cyclists must proceed slowly to avoid pedestrians, and walkers must have good balance and ability to change direction to avoid the cyclists.

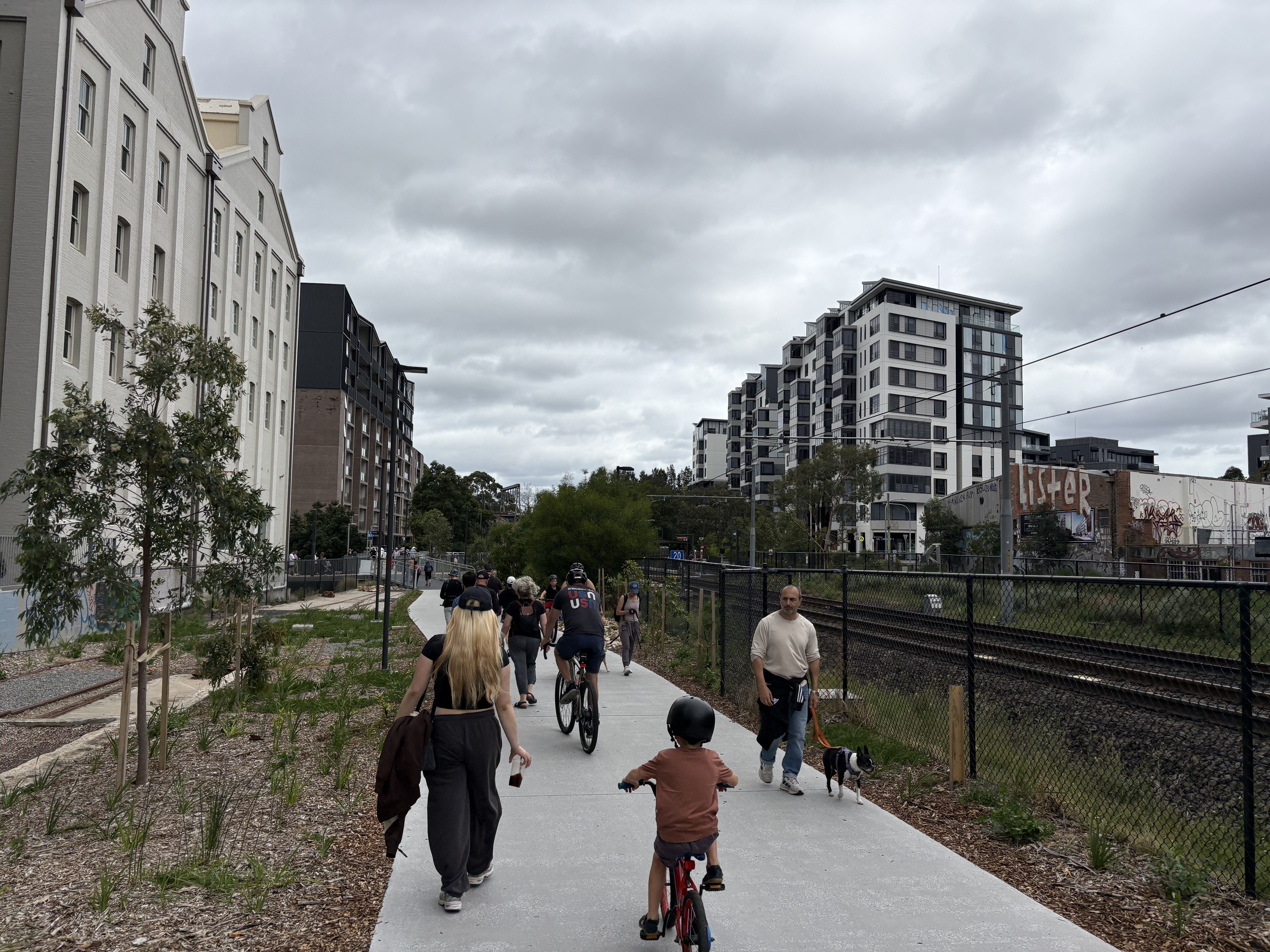
In narrower sections of the GreenWay, cyclists and pedestrians must be careful to avoid each other

The majority of the trail is separated from the suburban streets, with exceptions in small sections (Ness Avenue and Tennant Parade at the south end and Weston Street in the middle section).

The GreenWay fills in previous missing links with three new tunnels in Longport Road, Davis Street and Constitution Road, and has two new underpasses in Parramatta Road and New Canterbury Road.

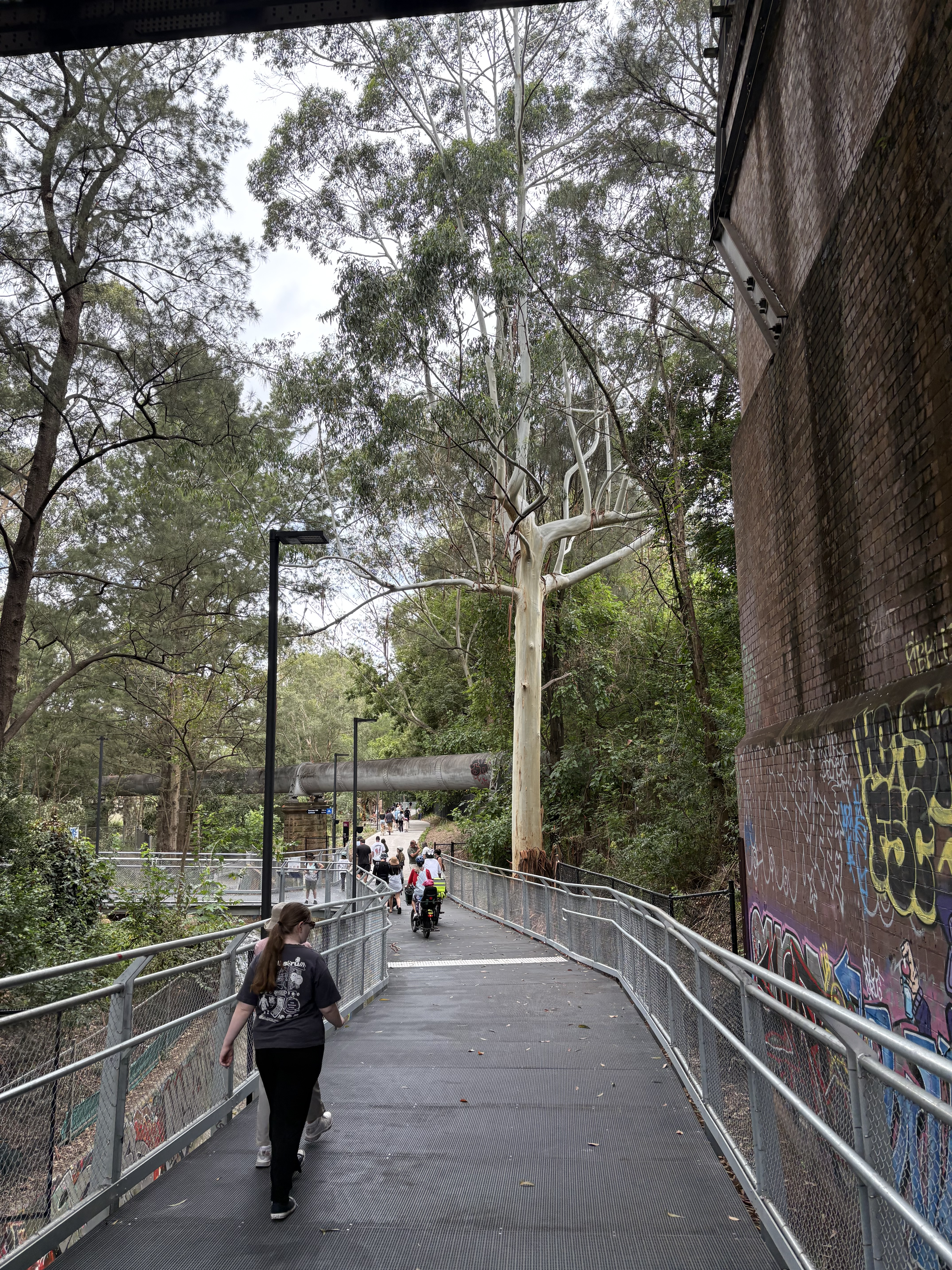
Section of the GreenWay passing through a tunnel under a heavy rail line

It passes through the suburbs of Dulwich Hill, Hurlstone Park, Lewisham, Petersham, Leichhardt and Haberfield. The trail will also connect with the Sydney Metro Southwest line upon opening in late 2026.

== History ==
Local residents realised in the mid-1990s that a greenway could be developed through the undeveloped land which he saw as a missing link near Hawthorne Canal, the idea had broad community support and was supported by the councils of Ashfield, Leichhardt, Marrickville, and Canterbury-Bankstown. The idea was inspired by a state government scheme in the late 1980s.

In 2009, a masterplan was publicly released. In 2010, the Rees government allocated $37 million to complete the project. Following a change in government, in 2011 transport minister Gladys Berejiklian scrapped funding for the GreenWay, claiming that the project was too expensive and citing poor planning decisions. She also claimed the project would delay the light rail extension to Dulwich Hill.

In 2016, the state government and the Inner West Council committed $7 million each to resume the project. Before this, the project had only been allocated $14 million of funding for the missing links it joined.

In 2018, another masterplan was released.

In August 2022, the state government committed an additional $9.8 million towards the completion of the trail, by that point a part of the trail at Richard Murden Reserve in Haberfield was already completed and further construction was due to start by November. Along with this funding announcement, it was also announced that the council would be continuing with upgrades to the seawall at Dobroyd Point, a shared path through Richard Murden Reserve, shared paths through streets in Dulwich Hill, and a lighting upgrade at the Bay Run.

By May 2025 the project was 80 percent complete.

=== Delivery ===
The project was funded by the Government of New South Wales, Inner West Council and federal government, contributing $41 million, $11 million and $6 million respectively. The federal money was used to build a tunnel under Old Canterbury Road. In total, the project cost $57 million to construct.

== Reception ==
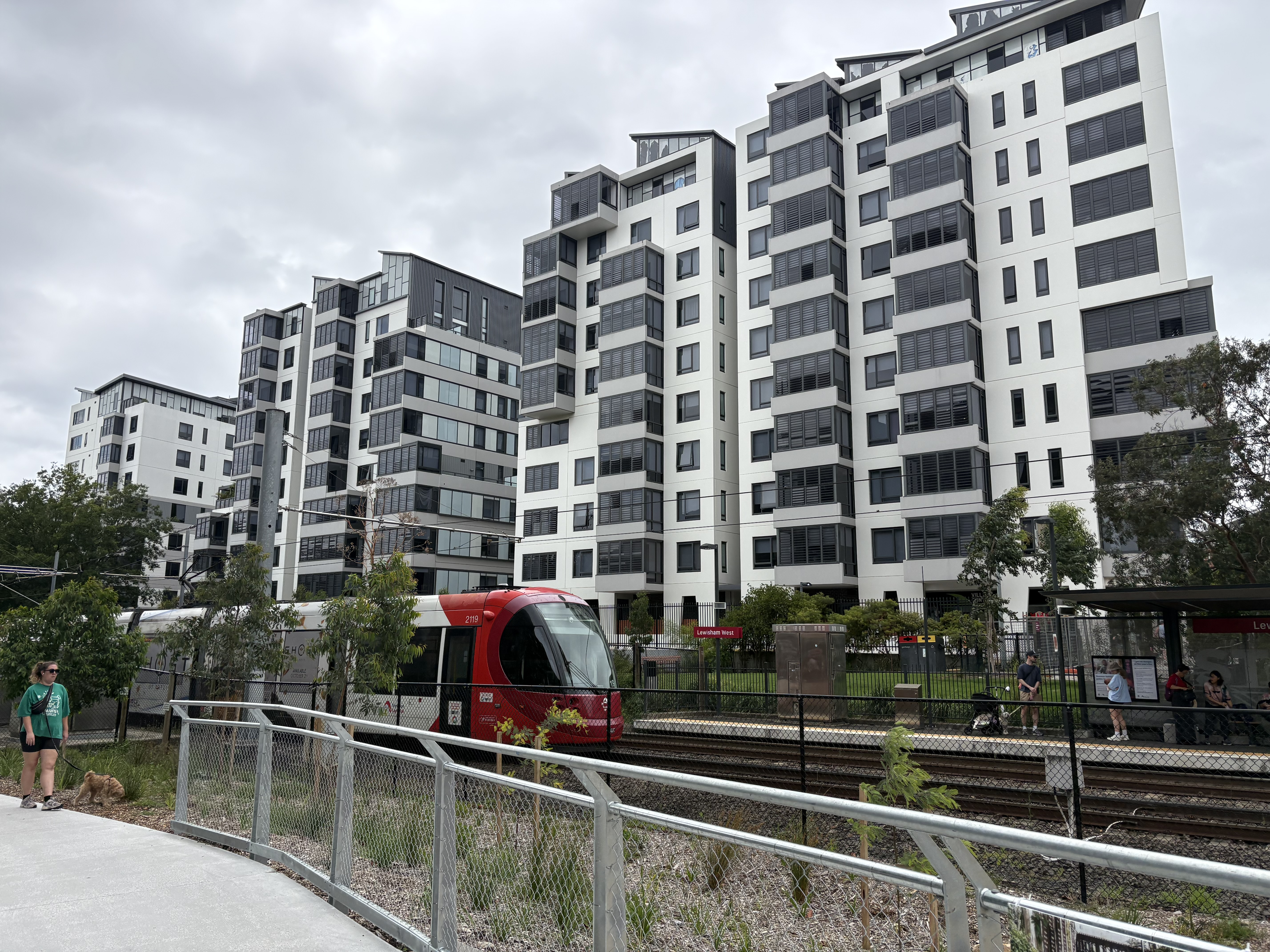
Much of the GreenWay follows the L1 light rail corridor

Local residents have favourably compared the layout of the trail to New York City's High Line. The project has been heralded by the mayor of the Inner West Council Darcy Byrne, the transport minister of New South Wales John Graham, and the chief executive of Bicycle NSW Peter McLean. Premier Chris Minns has also praised the project. Byrne said that the GreenWay is going "gangbusters". A spokesperson for the Inner West Council said that the GreenWay had been "incredibly popular" and that the trail has been "performing above expectations".

Former Ashfield councillor Monica Wangmann criticised the decision to grow the light rail and allow for greater housing density rather than allowing the trail to flourish.

Residents of Weston Street in Dulwich Hill have complained of increased noise and activity from bicycle riders from the GreenWay. Residents have also complained about the possibility of an injury to be caused by a vehicle. One resident claimed that the section going through Weston Street is "not fit for purpose".

== Future ==
Upon opening of the Sydenham to Bankstown extension of the Sydney Metro Southwest project, a new 13.8 km walking and cycling trail named the "MetroWay" will open and connect to the GreenWay. The MetroWay will include 350 bike spaces at railway stations, public art, trees, rest stops, lights and signs. State government transport minister John Graham stated that the planned MetroWay will cater to users of all ages and riding abilities. Graham also pointed to benefits such as increased housing opportunities.
