= Derrylyn =

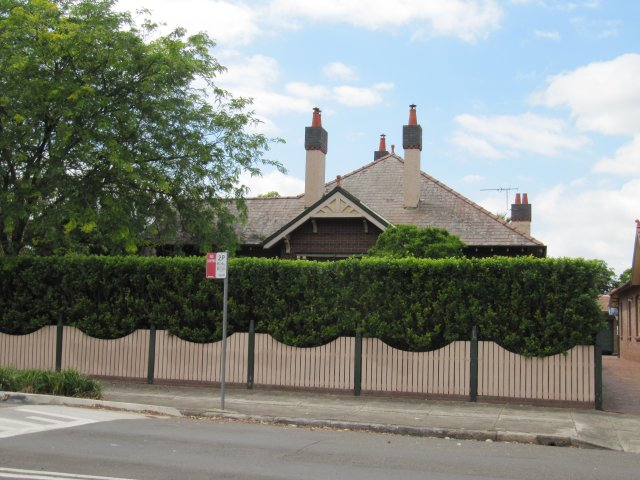
- Derrylyn behind a high hedge

- Location within inner Sydney
- Interactive map of Derrylyn
- 33°52′45″S 151°08′25″E
- Location: 16 Deakin Avenue, Haberfield, Inner West Council, Sydney New South Wales, Australia

History
- Built: 1910
- Built for: Richard Stanton

Site notes
- Architectural style: Federation Bungalow

New South Wales Heritage Register
- Official name: Derrylyn
- Type: State heritage (built)
- Designated: 2 April 1999
- Reference no.: 279
- Type: House
- Category: Residential buildings (private)

Derrylyn is a heritage-listed house at 16 Deakin Avenue, Haberfield, New South Wales, a suburb of Sydney, Australia. It was added to the New South Wales State Heritage Register on 2 April 1999.

== History ==
The Haberfield and Dobroyd Point area was used as farmland with scattered industries until after the coming of the steam tramway from Leichhardt to Five Dock. The 1893 Depression retarded subdivision. In 1901 Richard Stanton and W. H. Nichols, real estate agents of Summer Hill, purchased 20 hectares (50 acres) of the Dobroyd Estate from the Ramsay family.

Richard Stanton was an Irish immigrant whose father developed a furniture and auctioneer's business in Summer Hill. By 1910, Stanton controlled 81 hectares (200 acres).

The first subdivision occurred by 1903 and Stanton moved to the new estate in 1907. The original Dobroyd House was demolished and the Bunyas was erected by Stanton, to a design commissioned from the Haberfield Estate architect, John Spencer-Stansfield. Over 1,000 houses on this estate are thought to have been designed by Spencer-Stansfield.

Derrylyn was built in 1910 in the Federation Bungalow style.

An Interim Conservation Order was placed on it on 11 December 1981 at the request of the vendor who was concerned that future owners of the property may propose internal and external changes to the house. With the agreement of the new owner a Permanent Conservation Order was placed over the property on 2 December 1983.

In 1983 through the Heritage Assistance program funding assistance was provided to erect a new picket fence.

A swimming pool with brick paving and a child-proof fence was added in 1984, and approval was granted for a garage/carport of sympathetic design in 1985. A new picket fence was constructed the same year.

Approval was granted for re-landscaping of the grounds in 1992.

On 2 April 2000 the property was added to the State Heritage Register.

== Description ==
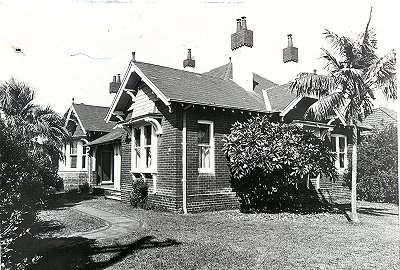
Historic view of Derrylyn

Derrylyn is a large single storey federation cottage of two-tone bricks with a fine slate and terracotta roof punctuated by numerous tall roughcast chimneys.

== Heritage listing ==
Derrylyn was listed on the New South Wales State Heritage Register on 2 April 1999 having satisfied the following criteria.

The place is important in demonstrating the course, or pattern, of cultural or natural history in New South Wales.

Derrylyn, built in 1910, is a large single storey federation cottage of two-tone bricks with a fine slate and terracotta roof punctuated by numerous tall roughcast chimneys. The building is prominently sited on the corner of Dalhousie Street and Deakin Avenue, Haberfield. It retains many of its original features.
