= The Bunyas =

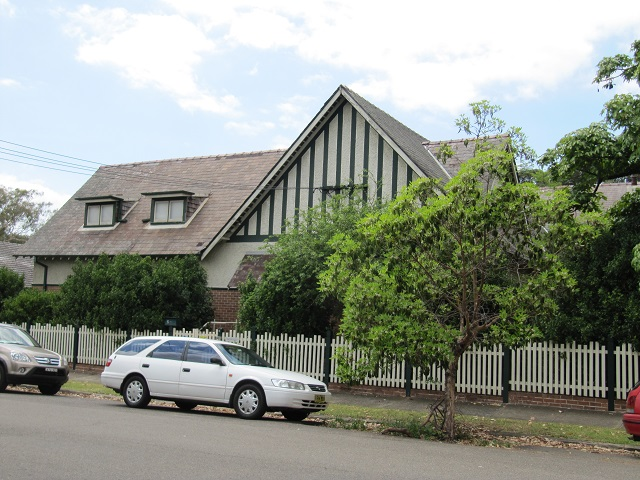

- Location within inner Sydney
- 33°53′01″S 151°08′08″E
- Location: 5 Rogers Avenue, Haberfield, Inner West Council, Sydney, New South Wales, Australia

History
- Built: 1900–1907

Site notes
- Architect: John Spencer-Stansfield

New South Wales Heritage Register
- Official name: Bunyas; The Bunyas; Stanton Residence
- Type: state heritage (complex / group)
- Designated: 2 April 1999
- Reference no.: 317
- Type: Mansion
- Category: Residential buildings (private)

The Bunyas is a heritage-listed residence and former church missionary and scout headquarters at 5 Rogers Avenue, Haberfield, New South Wales, a suburb of Sydney, Australia. It was designed by John Spencer-Stansfield and built from 1900 to 1907. It is also known as Stanton Residence. It was added to the New South Wales State Heritage Register on 2 April 1999.

== History ==
The Haberfield and Dobroyd Point area was used as farmland with scattered industries until after steam tramway came from Leichhardt to Five Dock. The 1893 Depression retarded subdivision.

The property now known as 'The Bunyas' has been occupied by two prominent local families, the Ramsays and the Stantons.

David and Sarah Ramsay took possession of the Dobroyd Estate, as Haberfield was then known, in the mid-1820s. Both lived at Dobroyd House on the corner of Parramatta Road and Dalhousie Street until David's death in 1860. After his demise, portions of the Dobroyd Estate were given to Ramsay children and Sarah continued to live at Dobroyd House until her death in 1889.

In 1901 Richard Stanton and W. H. Nichols, real estate agents of Summer Hill, purchased 20 hectares (50 acres) of the Dobroyd Estate from the Ramsay family.

Stanton purchased parts of the Dobroyd Estate from members of the Ramsay family and on them developed his model "Garden Suburb". He is said to have named the area Haberfield after his mother's maiden name and this gradually replaced the Dobroyd Estate as the name of the area.

Stanton was an Irish immigrant (Note: Stanton and family arrived on 29 November 1862.) whose father, Patrick, developed a furniture and auctioneer's business in Summer Hill. (Note: From 1882 it was a real estate agency called 'Stanton & Son') Richard continued the business after his father's death in 1889. In 1893 he married Florence Nicholls. In 1901 he purchased that portion of the Dobroyde Estate that belonged to Margaret Ramsay and, on it, began development of the Haberfield Estate.

The first subdivision occurred by 1903.

In 1905 the Ramsay family vacated Dobroyd House. Stanton purchased the property, had Dobroyd House demolished and, in its place, built "The Bunyas", into which his family moved in 1907, showing his faith in the new development.

Stanton, the managing director of Haberfield P/L, placed his home in spacious grounds which extended from present day Rogers Avenue to Dalhousie Street, and from Parramatta Road to a line opposite Tinana Street. "The Bunyas" was the largest house in the Haberfield Estate. Under a massive, multi-gabled slate roof, the house features shingled gables, stone pillars on the eastern verandah and a large arch enveloping its entry porch covered in rough cast. It is entered by double doors from this porch. Leadlight glass was used in the front doors, their sidelights, the triple windows above the front door and in the vestibule lantern. The vestibule leads into large rooms suitable for entertaining. The original drawing room is to the left and beside it the dining room. A timber fretwork screen divides vestibule from the hall. Off the hall were bedrooms and to the left a staircase leading to servants' quarters. Also off the vestibule and beside the hall was the morning room which opens onto the eastern-facing verandah.

It was named after the bunya pines which stood in the surrounding area during the days of the Ramsays. The present bunya pines were planted by Scouts Australia, as seedlings, in 1986.

The house was designed by John Spencer Stansfield (Note: His correct name was Spencer-Stansfeld, but he gave his name as Spencer-Stansfield.) in the Federation bungalow style, as the family home of Richard Stanton and it was home to the family from 1907. It was designed to face Parramatta Road and Dalhousie Street and the original area of the property was 15,864 square metres (170,760 sq ft). Spencer-Stansfield was the architect for the Haberfield Model Suburb from 1905 to 1914 and according to 'Who's Who' of 1929, designed over 1000 houses, and "specialises in high-class domestic architecture".

In 1908, with other estate agents, Stanton helped form the Western Suburbs Real Estate Agents' Association. Two years later he played a prominent role in establishing the Real Estate Auctioneers' and Agents' Association of NSW - this became the Real Estate Institute in 1921. He served on its board for many years and was president from 1922 to 1923. He attempted to improve the ethics of estate agents and raise their status in the community. In 1913 he became a fellow of the Auctioneers' and Estate Agents' Institute of the United Kingdom.

By 1910, Stanton controlled 81 hectares (200 acres).

The Bunyas featured in the edition of 1 February 1913 of Home & Garden Beautiful magazine, at which time it was described as the largest and most complete cottage residence in the state. Several photographs of its extensive gardens were featured, showing grassed walks, bunya pine and other tall trees, dense shrubs such as giant bird-of-paradise flower (Strelitzia nicolae), palms and bedding plants.

Stanton and his family lived in The Bunyas until 1917 when they moved to Onslow Avenue, Elizabeth Bay. From 1917 until 1927 The Bunyas was occupied by Herbert Field, J.P. and his family. Field had been born in England in 1878 and migrated with his parents to Sydney in 1885. In 1900 Herbert and his brothers, Thomas and Sydney, inherited their father's wholesale and retail butchering business. During World War I the Field Brothers controlled about one third of Sydney's wholesale meat business through their own company and through their interests in James Elliott and Co. Ltd. and with listed assets of 1,100,000 pounds ($2.2m); Tom was chairman, Herbert and Sydney were directors. Before moving to Haberfield, Herbert and his family lived in Annandale. He was one of several businessmen who moved with their families from Annandale to Haberfield between about 1914 and 1920. From Haberfield the Fields moved to Bellevue Hill, where Herbert named his new home "The Bunyas".

In 1928, after Stanton and his family had left, the land fronting Dalhousie Street and Parramatta Road was subdivided and sold for residential development. This comprised the front and much of the backyard of the property. This included subdivision to the east (Dalhousie Street) where blocks of inter-war flats were built; and to the south facing Parramatta Road where a car yard/service station was built.

Blocks of flats were built and Wadd's plant nursery was established (on the corner of Parramatta Road and Rogers Avenue) in the former front garden of The Bunyas in the late 1920s and early 1930s. These included Mayfair Court (149 Parramatta Road); Brundah Flats (1931, at 151 Parramatta Road) and Penliegh Hall flats (1929, at 153 Parramatta Road).

Rogers Avenue commemorates William Rogers (1855-1930), an Alderman on the Ashfield Municipal Council from 1914 to 1922, a baker and bread-carter who owned a large bakery at 32 Orpington Street almost facing Pembroke Street. He was President of the Ashfield Bowling Club from 1918 to 1920. Until about 1915 Rogers Avenue was known as Orpington Street, which had been extended from Ashfield in 1908. The first houses were occupied in Rogers Avenue (then Orpington Street) in 1908 after completion of The Bunyas.

The house itself was purchased with a 1.25 acre (about 0.5ha) curtilage by the Methodist Missionary Society of Australia who used it for a Missionary Training College. This was officially opened on 9 June 1928 as "The George Brown Methodist Training College" with Rev. J. W. Burton as the principal. George Brown was born in England, migrating to New Zealand in 1855, was ordained a Methodist Minister in 1860 and became a South Pacific missionary. By 1881 Sydney had become his headquarters for his missionary activities. He died at his home in the Sydney suburb of Gordon in 1917 and is buried at Gore Hill Cemetery. Salote Tupou III, Queen of Tonga from 1918 to 1965, was a devout Methodist and often resided at The Bunyas when visiting Sydney. Later it became the "Pacific Islanders Centre" of the Uniting Church of Australia. It was used for church purposes until the 1980s.

In the early 1980s the property was threatened with subdivision into building allotments and demolition of the house.

On 18 April 1982, Vincent Crow, a concerned local historian, applied to the Heritage Council of New South Wales for a conservation order to be placed on the property. This was put into effect on 3 December 1982 and had the effect of preventing demolition or alteration of any building or plantings on the land without prior approval of the Heritage Council. This interim conservation order was renewed in September 1984. A permanent conservation order was placed on The Bunyas in 1986.

In November 1984 The Bunyas was purchased by The Scout Association of Australia to become their NSW headquarters. Scouts Australia restored the home and put a sympathetic extension on the former servants' quarters wing (the western side of the house) (1985–86) which can be seen from Rogers Avenue. The new west wing provided offices, bathrooms and other areas for the scouts. Part of the servants' quarters containing small rooms facing Rogers Avenue was demolished and an addition made. In converting the house to provide efficient office accommodation and comfortable meeting facilities, Scouts Australia restored the principal rooms and building exterior.

In 1999 The Bunyas was added to the NSW State Heritage Register.

Scouts Australia vacated the property in 2004. They sold the property to Korean-born developer Jin Park for a reported $4 million. In 2005, The Bunyas was rezoned from Special Uses: Scouts to Residential and returned to residential use. The 1985 west wing was to be used as a home office, in which a recent door was infilled and two new openings made. The property sold for $5,250,000 in September 2012.

== Description ==
=== Site ===
The site is on the western side of Haberfield Garden Suburb, once (but not now) facing Parramatta Road. It is a large, flat yet irregularly shaped land parcel of 5,088 square metres (54,770 sq ft), (Note: Crow, 2010, 199 states 5,085.9 square metres (54,744 sq ft)) having a 66-metre (217 ft) frontage to Rogers Avenue (off Parramatta Road). Rogers Avenue is characterised by single-storey detached houses and brush box (Lophostemon confertus) avenue tree planting. Neighbouring houses are predominantly of the period Federation and California bungalow styles. To the south facing Parramatta Road is a car yard/service station.

The 5,088-square-metre (54,770 sq ft) property includes grounds with lawn areas and established trees, including bunya pine (Araucaria bidwillii), Illawarra flame tree (Brachychiton acerifolium), Cocos Island/Queen palm (Syragus romanzoffianum), and Nile/African lilies (Agapanthus orientalis cv.).

=== Garden ===
The garden at the Bunyas was designed and managed by a woman. It contains a mixture of garden features dating from about 50 years earlier and more recent plantings. In one portion there is a gnarled and twisted nearly century-old ivy vine (Hedera sp.), once the entrance to the old homestead of John Ramsay, the estate's original owner (Dobroyde House/estate). The vine receives regular care and attention. The grass-covered walks and drives were also an innovation at a time when gravel-covered walks were more common.

A serpentine path leads from front gate to front entrance porch, flanked by beds of shrubs and with two specimen fan palms (Washingtonia sp.) and a NZ cabbage tree (Cordyline australis) specimen on the lawn. A bunya pine is also visible in this view near the front entrance porch. A view of the garden and side porch shows two bunya pines beyond the house as backdrop (clearly pre-dating the house and from the Ramsay/Dobroyde estate era), a specimen conifer on the side lawn, a Lord Howe Island palm (Howea (now Kentia) sp.), shrubs and flowers close to the house and porch/verandah, grass strips flanking a curving path that straightens to run alongside the side porch/verandah, a strip ribbon bed within the lawn on the far side of this path and expansive lawn (xii). Another photograph of "a corner of the garden and verandah" shows an open verandah on two sides (a corner) of the house with another serpentine path edged with brick, flanked by lawn, various "fiddly" flower beds cut in the lawn, a low timber post and rail and "crinkle wire" fence and timber gate giving onto what appears to be a woodland area, comprising eucalypts (likely to be turpentine ironbark forest, which is native/remnant on the Liberty Plains/Ashfield area), other exotic trees including a Norfolk Island pine (Araucaria heterophylla) etc. (147). Another photograph (p. 151) shows "a grass covered walk" which is at least 6m wide, edged in brick swale drains, flanked on either side by avenue tree planting. It is not clear what species the trees are, although branch pattern on some suggests Norfolk Island pines, others could be bunya pines (A.bidwillii). A large specimen of what appears to be the tree bird-of-paradise flower (Strelitizia nicolae) with its white and blue flowers and large banana-like leaves is on one corner of this walk.

Trees include bunya-bunya pine (several) (Araucaria bidwillii), jelly palm (Butia capitata, spotted gum (Corymbia maculata), golden Monterey cypress (Cupressus macrocarpa "Aurea"), tree ferns (Cyathea sp.), fig (Ficus sp.), jacaranda (Jacaranda mimosifolia), Canary Island date palm (Phoenix canariensis), golden willow (Salix vitellina "Aurea"), Chinese tallow tree (Sapium sabiferum) and desert fan palm tree (Washingtonia robusta).

Shrubs include bottlebrush (Callistemon sp./cv.), autumn camellia (Camellia sasanqua cv.), green nightshade (cestrum parqui), sweet daphne (daphne odora), rose-of-Sharon/Syrian hibiscus (Hibiscus syriacus), hydrangeas (Hydrangea macrophylla cv.s), sacred bamboo (Nandina domestica), azaleas (Rhododendron indicum cv.s), Tibouchina sp., lasiandra.

Ground covers include the bugle (Ajuga reptans), bromeliad (Billbergia nutans) and spider plants (Chlorophytum comosum).

=== House ===
The Bunyas is the largest house from the Federation period in Haberfield. English Arts & Crafts influence is seen in its large roof with tapering chimneys and in the rough-cast work on the facade. However American Shingle Style is evident in the timber shingles on the main gable. The western wing (nearest Rogers Avenue) originally contained the servants' quarters but was partially demolished and then enlarged in the 1980s.

It is of generous proportions, renovated with grand interiors including a billiard room and a selection of formal and casual living spaces. Traditional interior details remain along with contemporary finishes.

The front entrance is a roomy porch (entered through a semi-circular arch in plaster) of tiled mosaic pattern with double doors with leadlight windows leading into a large vestibule hall with parquet flooring, domed ceiling with mock panels. The walls up to 2.4 metres (8 ft) high are of plain brick and all woodwork is treated in smoked oak. Immediately inside the entrance is a cloak room fitted with lavatory basin. The drawing room on the left is entered through sliding doors, which, thrown back, connect it to the hall.

At the northern end on the right is the morning room, which opens onto a verandah by six casement doors, fitted with diapered lead light, supported by stone columns. The main bedrooms also lead onto this loggia. A photograph of part of this room- the fireplace describes it as made of blackwood (Acacia melanoxylon), tiled face (in vertical stripes), shelves at the side for books and newspapers, a rack for pipes, tobacco, shelf etc., the room's panelled walls and bricked surround, copper furnishing to all fittings.

On the left of the vestibule is the dining room, which is fitted throughout in oak, with solid beam ceiling and a brick fireplace with large copper hood surmounted by massive oak shelf mantel. The sideboard is recessed, close to which is a glass cupboard. The dining table is circular, the room lit by a large round electric lamp with deep crimson shade. The whole effect of this room is quaint early English.

Out of the vestibule the smaller hall leads to the main bedrooms, etc. Special features in connection with the arrangement of these rooms are that there are no wardrobes, all being let in the walls and fitted as cupboards etc., the doors entering same being features in connection with the mantels and fireplaces.

The billiard room has a beam ceiling, panelled walls, with corner seats and benches, at the end of which are attached cue racks. The fireplace is recessed with room for card table etc. The walls are stencilled above the panelling, and the lamps have been specially designed in keeping with the general character of the room.

The lighting of the house is electric, and in all cases fittings have been specially designed according to the style of architecture.

It is considered to be the largest and most complete cottage residence in the state, and all the furniture has been designed specially in character with each room, in most cases fitments and fittings are of a permanent character.

Notwithstanding the extent of distortion of its form through the addition of the "western wing" is substantially intact in both its external and internal fitments and elements.

The property is the approximate site of Dobroyde House, which may have been the adapted form of Sunning Hill Farm, a very early colonial establishment. The Bunyas site may have archaeological potential.

== Heritage listing ==
The Bunyas is a fine example of an Arts and Crafts Bungalow that, not withstanding the extent of distortion of its form through the addition of the "western wing" is substantially intact in both its external and internal fitments and elements. Its primary significance is, however, its direct association with Richard Stanton, the progenitor of Haberfield, and as the major extant work of its architect, John Spencer-Stansfield.

A substantial and largely intact house in the then modern Arts & Crafts style, being the only 2 storey house built in the Federation Garden Suburb of Haberfield. Historical associations with Richard Stanton, the builder of the Garden Suburb. (National Trust of Australia (NSW), 1982).

Bunyas was listed on the New South Wales State Heritage Register on 2 April 1999.
