= St. David's Road Depot =

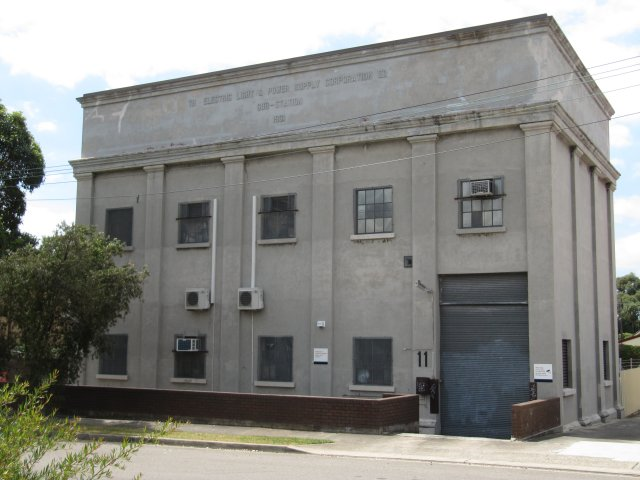

- Location within inner Sydney
- 33°53′05″S 151°08′14″E
- Location: 11 St Davids Road, Haberfield, Inner West Council, Sydney, New South Wales, Australia

History
- Built: 1931

Site notes
- Owner: Ausgrid

New South Wales Heritage Register
- Official name: Relay Test Centre; St. David's Road Depot; former ELPSC Substation; former Substation No.1518.
- Type: State heritage (built)
- Designated: 2 April 1999
- Reference no.: 933
- Type: Electricity Transformer/Substation
- Category: Utilities - Electricity

St. David's Road Depot is a heritage-listed former electricity substation at 11 St Davids Road, Haberfield, Inner West Council, Sydney, New South Wales, Australia. It was built in 1931. It is also known as the former ELPSC Substation; former Substation No.1518. and the Relay Test Centre. The property is owned by Ausgrid. It was added to the New South Wales State Heritage Register on 2 April 1999.

== History ==
St. David's Road appears in 1888, with four residents on unidentified plots on its eastern side. Further development occurred in the early 20th century, under the salesmanship of Richard Stanton, with progressive infill on intervening lots.

In 1912 the Australian Building Co. is shown as first occupant of St. David's Road near the corner of Parramatta Road and 13 St.David's Road. The Australian Building Co. also appeared as 119 Parramatta Road, between St. Davids Road and O'Connor St. in 1914. The address on the corner of Parramatta Road, no. 131 (now 129-131) was occupied by a grocer or fruiterer, which remained a constant throughout the ensuing period to 1933.

In January 1921 The Sun newspaper reported a large fire at the Australian Timber Company, on a large site on the corner of Parramatta Road and St. David's Road. The timber yard, owned by F. O. Hedger, former mayor of Ashfield (and manager of the Australian Building Co.) noted a weatherboard cottage on the site occupied by a family named Bolton, adjacent to the yard and behind the big furnace.

The Australian Timber Co. disappeared from Sands Directories between 1924 and 1928. In 1929 a Hudson & Sons, Timber Merchants, appeared at 117 Parramatta Road, suggesting the business was sold to a competitor. Walter Bolton remained at no.13 St.David's Road beyond 1932.

St. David's Substation was built in 1930 and completed in 1931, by McIntyre & Cable of Undercliffe. When completed it was the ELPSC's second 22/5.5 kV installation and an outdoor yard at the rear of the building accommodated the 22 kV switchgear and transformers. Within the building the main 5.5 kV switchboard was located on the top floor and the ground floor had an auxiliary 5.5 kV switchboard, a distribution transfoer and low-voltage switchboard for local supply, transformers and switchgear for three series street lighting circuits.

Taken out of service as a substation in the 1960s the site was subsequently used as a maintenance depot and relay testing centre for the Sydney County Council.

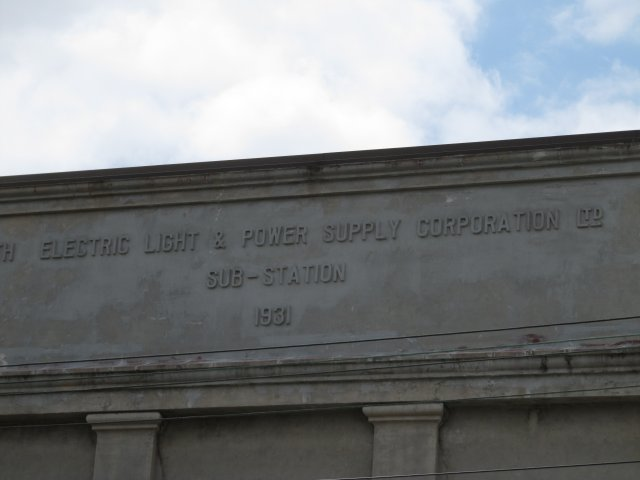
Words on the entablature

The entablature displays the words " THE ELECTRIC LIGHT & POWER SUPPLY CORPORATION LTD, SUB-STATION, 1931". Historical period: 1926-1950

== Description ==
St. David's Road Depot is a substantial building of three or four storeys in height, but with only two layers of fenestration. It is in the Interwear Stripped Classical architectural style It is completely cement rendered, with classical proportions. It has been built in the Interwar Stripped Classical style, elements of which include a decorative cornice and very high entablature which continue around the sides of the building. The windows have slightly projecting cement rendered sills.

It is constructed of cement rendered brickwork with metal framed windows.

Wire mesh screens have been added to the windows, with window mounted airconditioning units also installed.

The building was reported as being in good condition as at 8 November 2000.

== Heritage listing ==
The (former) Relay Test Centre is of State heritage significance. It is a representative example of a substantial and well maintained Interwar stripped Classical purpose designed structure built as part of the infrastructure for the introduction of electricity to the western suburbs of Sydney. It is located within the Haberfield Urban Conservation Area as listed by the National Trust and the Australian Heritage Commission.

Relay Test Centre was listed on the New South Wales State Heritage Register on 2 April 1999.
