= St. David's Church =

St. David's Church may refer to:

== Australia ==
- St David's Anglican, Adelaide, in the suburb of Burnside, South Australia
- St Davids Anglican Church, Allora, Queensland
- St David's Anglican Church, Mossman, Queensland
- St David's Uniting Church, Haberfield, New South Wales
- St David's Uniting Church, Newtown, Victoria
- St David's Uniting Church, Waubra, Victoria
- St David's Church, Hobart became St David's Cathedral, Hobart in 1842
- St David's Church, Sydney, meeting place of the Australian Aboriginal Progressive Association in the 1920s
- St David's Church, Toongabbie, Victoria

== Ireland ==
- St David's Church, Naas, County Kildare

== New Zealand ==
- Kāhui St David's, Auckland, formerly St David's Memorial Church
- St. David's Memorial Church, Cave, South Canterbury

== United Kingdom ==
=== England ===
- St David's Church, Exeter
- St David's Church, Haigh
- St David's Church, Highgate, Birmingham
- St David's Church, Shenley Green

=== Scotland ===
- St David's Church, Dalkeith
- St David's Parish Church, Knightswood, Glasgow

=== Wales ===
- St Davids Cathedral
- St David's Church, Barmouth
- St David's Church, Bettws
- Eglwys Dewi Sant, Cardiff
- St David's Church (Eglwys Dewi Sant), Carmarthen
- St David's Welsh Church, Colwyn Bay
- St David's Church, Connah's Quay
- St David's Church, Laleston
- Church of St David, Llanddewi Skirrid
- St. David's Church, Llanfaes
- St David's Church, Llangeview
- Church of St David, Llanthony, Monmouthshire
- St David's Church, Llywel, Powys
- St David's Welsh Church, Rhosllanerchrugog
- St David's Priory Church, Swansea

== United States ==
- St. David's Episcopal Church (Rayville, Louisiana)
- St. David Catholic Church (Madawaska, Maine)
- Belgrade and St. David's Church, Creswell, North Carolina
- St. David's Episcopal Church (Radnor, Pennsylvania)
- St. David's Episcopal Church and Cemetery, Cheraw, South Carolina
- St. David's Episcopal Church (Austin, Texas)
