= Dobroyd Point =

Locality in Sydney, Australia

Coordinates: 33°52′26″S 151°08′42″E

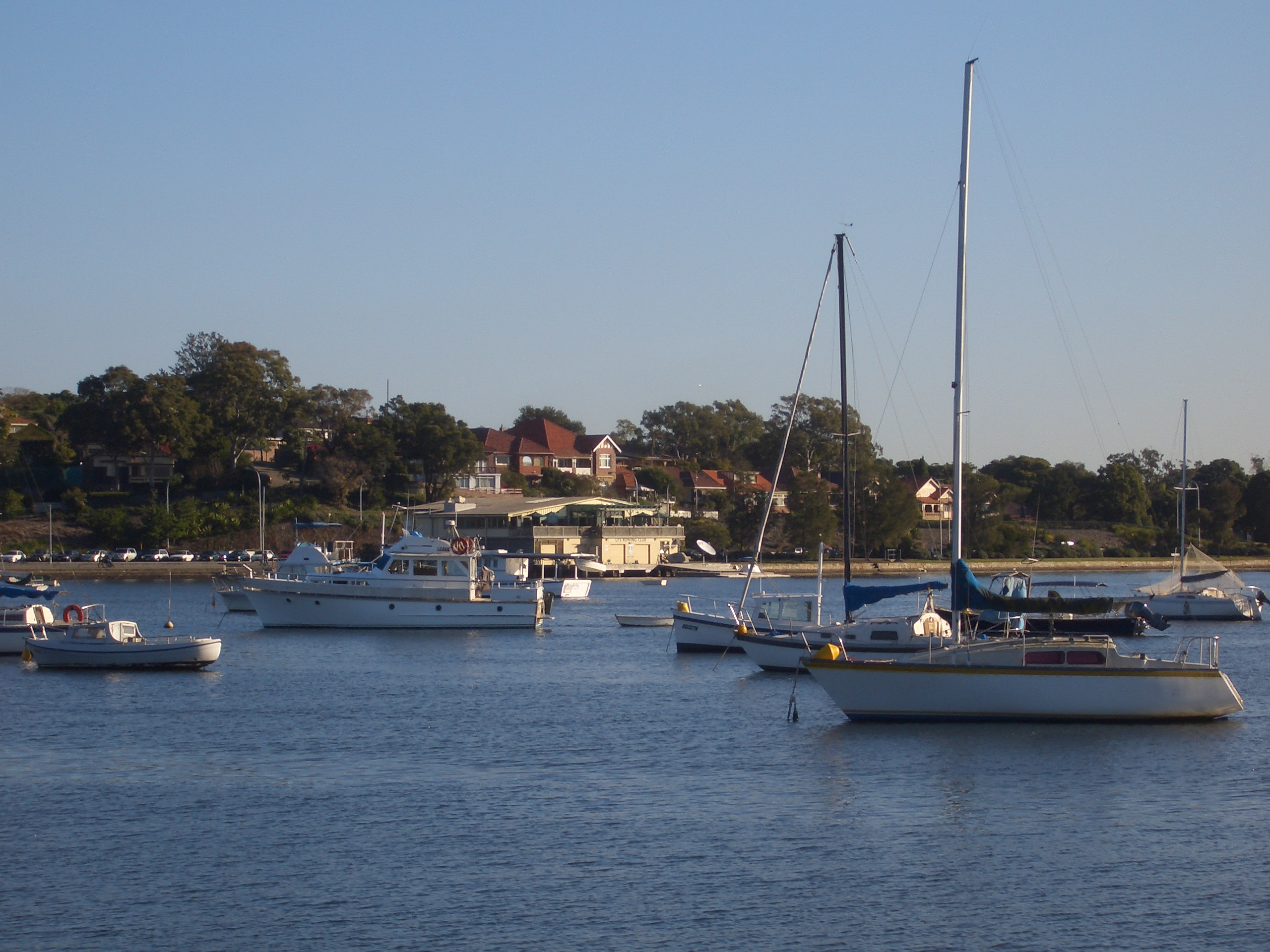
UTS Haberfield Rowing Club on Dobroyd Point

Dobroyd Point is an historical locality in the Inner West of Sydney, in the state of New South Wales, Australia. Dobroyd Point is part of the suburb of Haberfield, in the Inner West Council local government area. It faces the southern shoreline of Iron Cove bounded on the west by Iron Cove Creek, on the east by the Hawthorne Canal and on the south by Haberfield. It contains Robson Park, which has picnic, barbecue and toilet facilities. A bike track runs along the water edge.

The UTS Haberfield Rowing Club sits on Iron Cove and Dobroyd Parade. The Dobroyd Aquatic Club is located in the nearby suburb of Rodd Point.
