= Western Sydney =

Region of Sydney, Australia

- Region
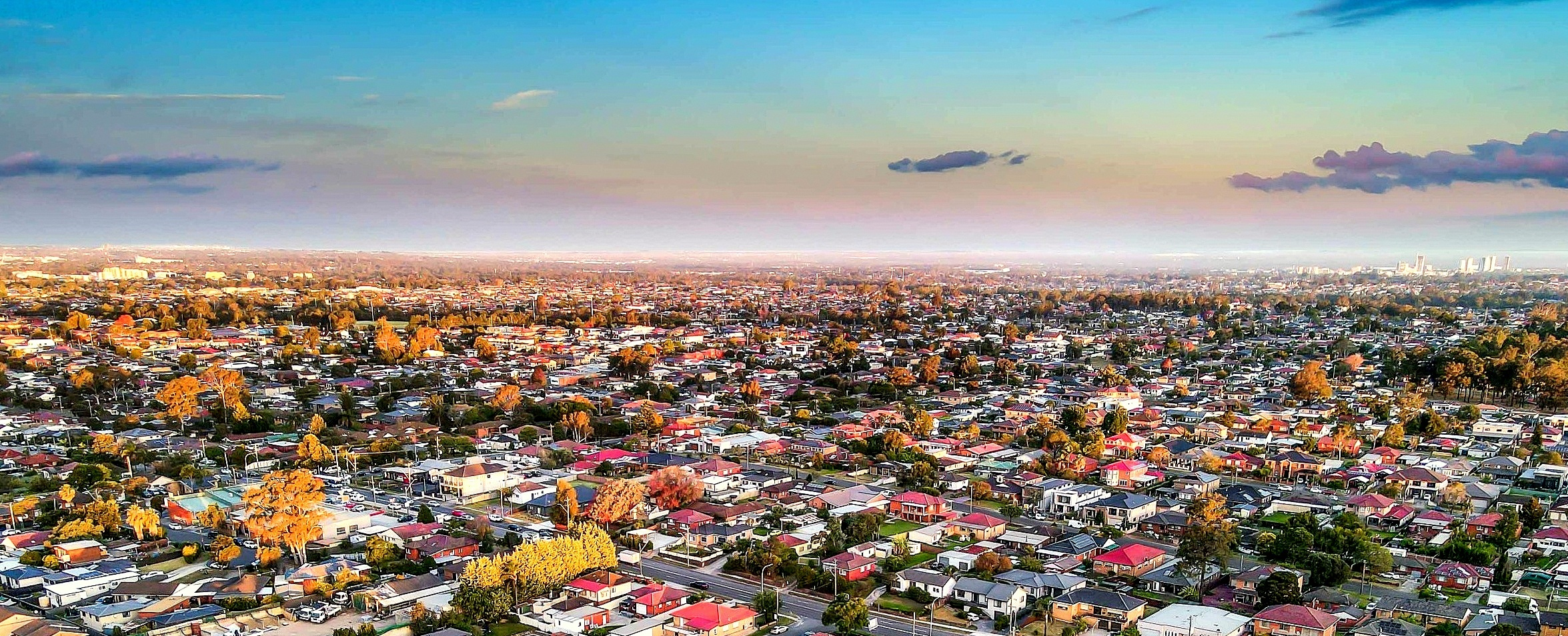
- Overlooking Smithfield in the foreground, Fairfield to the left, and the Liverpool skyline to the right

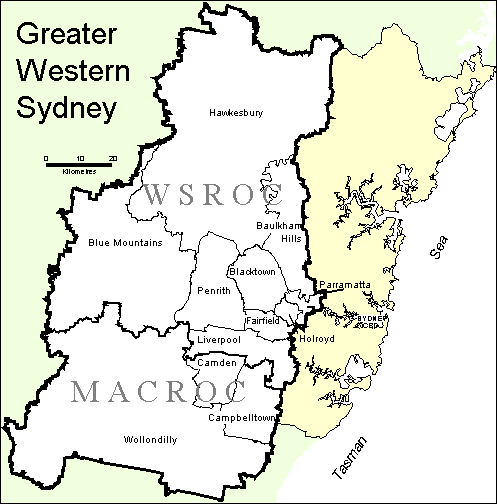
- Country: Australia
- State: New South Wales
- City: Sydney

Government
  - State electorate: Several (Note: Auburn, Badgerys Creek, Blacktown, Cabramatta, Camden, Campbelltown, Fairfield, Granville, Hawkesbury, Holsworthy, Leppington, Liverpool, Londonderry, Macquarie Fields, Mount Druitt, Parramatta, Penrith, Prospect, Riverstone, Winston Hills)
  - Federal division: Blaxland, Chifley, Fowler, Greenway, Hughes, Lindsay, Macarthur, McMahon, Mitchell, Parramatta, Werriwa
Regions around Western Sydney
Greater Blue Mountains Area	Hunter Region	Northern Sydney
Blue Mountains	Western Sydney
Penrith, New South Wales	Macarthur; Southern Highlands	Illawarra

Western Sydney is a region of Sydney in New South Wales, Australia that generally encompasses the north-west, outer-west, central-west, south-west and outer south-west suburbs of Greater Metropolitan Sydney, with the Blue Mountains forming the region's western fringe. Western Sydney consists of 11 local government areas: Blacktown, Blue Mountains, Camden, Campbelltown, Cumberland, Fairfield, Hawkesbury, Liverpool, Parramatta, Penrith and Wollondilly.

Radiocarbon dating suggests human activity occurred in the Sydney metropolitan area from around 30,000 years ago. The Darug people lived in the area that was greater western Sydney before European settlement regarded the region as rich in food from the river and forests. Parramatta was founded in 1788, the same year as Sydney, making it the second oldest city in Australia. Opened in 1811, Parramatta Road, which navigates into the heart of greater western Sydney, is one of Sydney's oldest roads and Australia's first highway between two cities, Sydney central business district (CBD) and Parramatta, which is now the sixth-largest business district in Australia. Rapid population increase after World War II saw the settlement of many ex-servicemen and migrants in the greater west, making it one of the most urbanised regions in the country and an area of growing national importance.

Being the third-largest economy in Australia, behind the Sydney CBD and Melbourne, the region covers 5,800 square kilometres (2,200 sq mi) and is one of the fastest growing populations in Australia, with an estimated resident population of 2,288,554 in 2017. Western Sydney has the most multicultural suburbs in the country, with 38% of the population speaking a language other than English at home, and up to 90% in some suburbs. Containing about 9% of Australia's population and 44% of Sydney's population, the people of Western Sydney are predominantly working-class, with major employment in heavy industry and vocational trades.

Encompassing significant areas of national parks, waterways and parklands, agricultural lands, natural bushland and a range of recreational and sporting facilities, the region also largely contains remnants of critically endangered native Cumberland Plain Bushland and World Heritage–listed areas of the Blue Mountains. The Hawkesbury and Nepean River system is Sydney's firsthand water source and the mainstay of the region's agricultural and fishing industries, and is also major recreational area for the inhabitants of GWS. The heritage-listed Warragamba Dam, the primary reservoir for water supply for Sydney, is located in the greater west.

== History ==
=== Indigenous settlement ===
Near Penrith, numerous Aboriginal stone tools were found in Cranebrook Terraces gravel sediments dating to 50,000–45,000 BP. For more than 30,000 years, Aboriginal people from the Gandangara tribe have lived in the Fairfield area. Prior to the arrival of the Europeans, the Penrith area was home to the Mulgoa tribe of the Dharug people, who spoke the Dharug language. They lived in makeshift huts called gunyahs, hunted native animals such as kangaroos, and fished in the Nepean River. The Auburn area was once used by Dharug people as a market place for the exchange of goods between them and Dharawal people on the coast. The area that later became Campbelltown was inhabited prior to European settlement by the Tharawal people. The people of what is now known as Carlingford, a suburb on the eastern peripheries of the greater west, were the Wallumedegal people, who practised fire-stick farming along the northern banks of the Parramatta River, which encouraged animals to graze, thus enhancing the ease of hunting and gathering. Most of the First Nations Peoples living in the area died due to introduced diseases, such as smallpox, following the arrival of the First Fleet, and the remainder were largely relocated to government farms and a series of settlements.

=== British colony ===
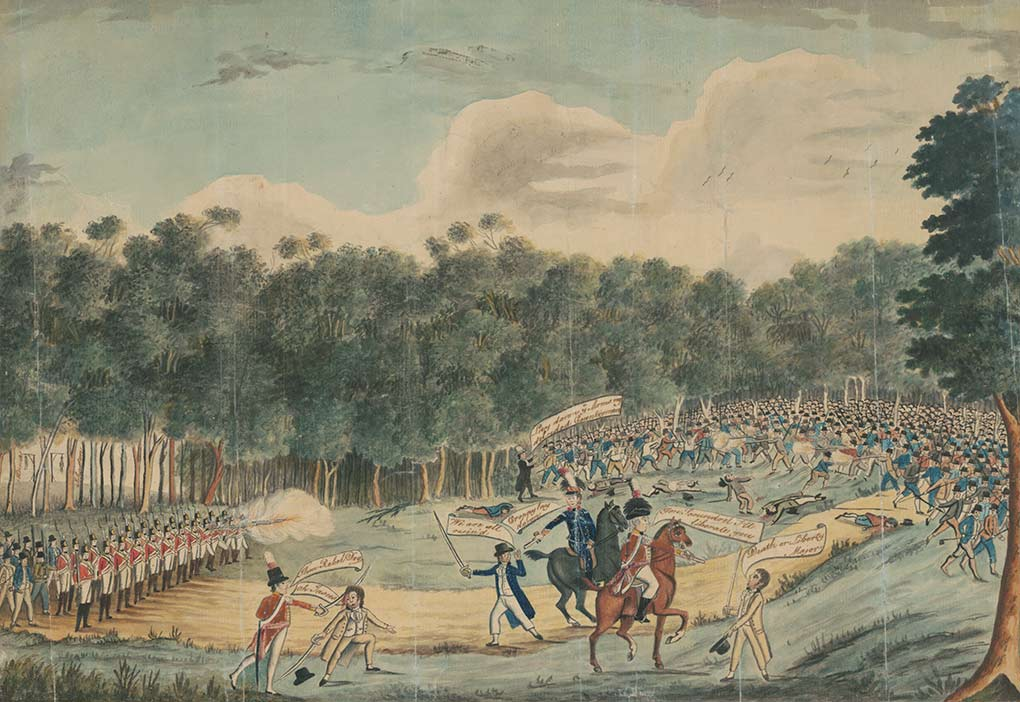
Castle Hill convict rebellion of 1804

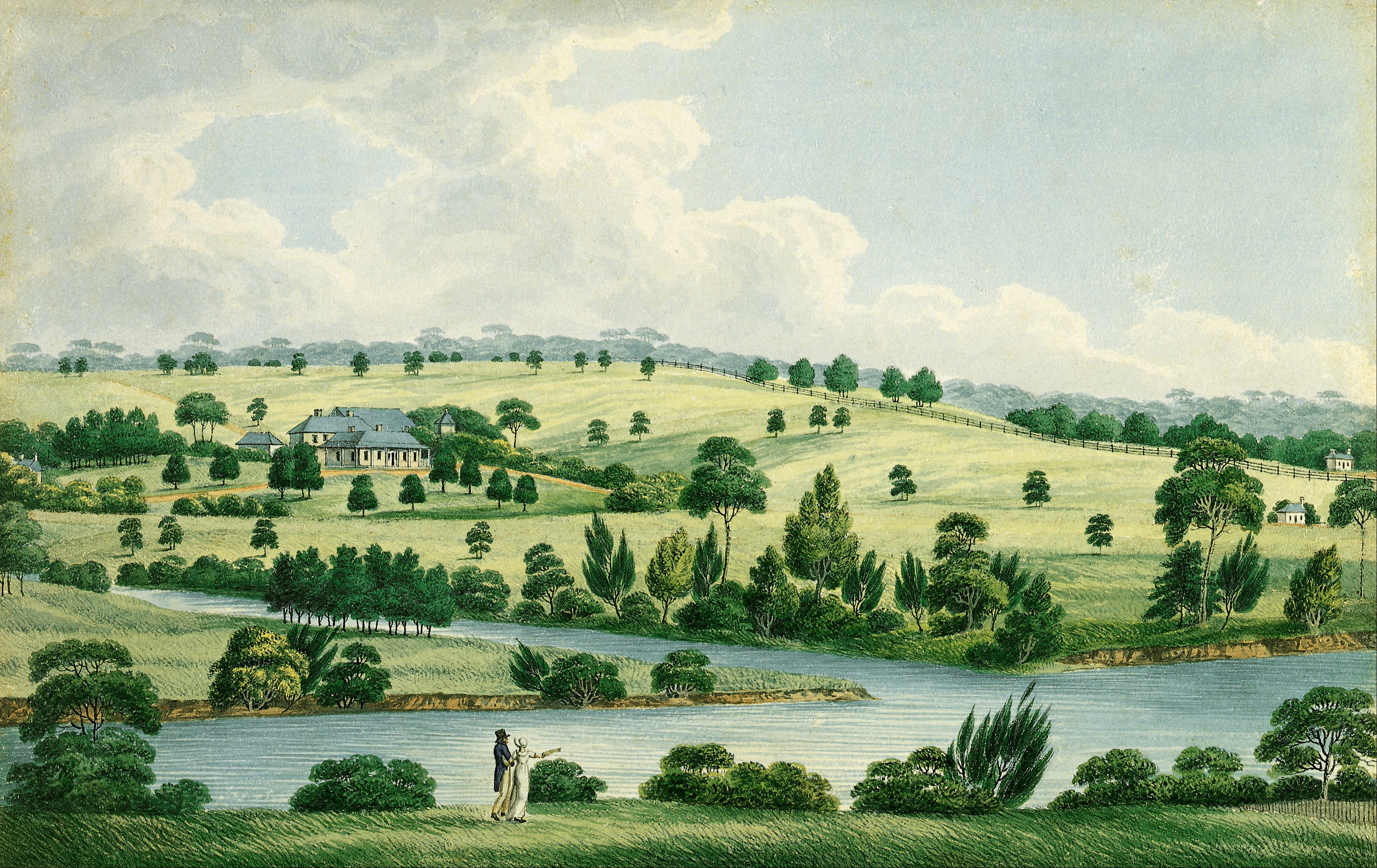
Rosehill in 1823, with Parramatta River in foreground

In 1788, Governor Arthur Phillip had reconnoitred several places before choosing Parramatta as the most likely place for a successful large farm, making it the second European settlement in Australia, after Sydney. Old Toongabbie was established in the same year. The Sydney Cove region originally settled in 1788 turned out to be unsuitable for farming, and after a number of years of near-famine in the colony, efforts were made to relocate food production inland to hopefully more climatically stable regions. Phillip sent exploratory missions in search of better soils and fixed on the Parramatta region as a promising area for expansion and moved many of the convicts from late 1788 to establish a small township, which became the main centre of the colony's economic life. Nevertheless, poor equipment and unfamiliar soils and climate continued to hamper the expansion of farming from Farm Cove to Parramatta and Toongabbie.

In February 1793, the Auburn area was established as the first free-agricultural settlement thanks to Governor Phillip's repeated applications to the British government for free settlers, and by the end of that decade Prospect, West Pennant Hills, Baulkham Hills and Greystanes were established. Eighteen months after the landing of the First Fleet, an exploring party led by Captain Watkin Tench set out to further findings made by Governor Phillip where, in 1789, they discovered the broad expanse of the Nepean River and Penrith. Windsor Road, one of the oldest roads in Sydney, was opened in 1794. In 1795, Matthew Flinders and George Bass explored up the Georges River for about 20 miles beyond what had been previously surveyed, and reported favourably to Governor John Hunter of the land on its banks. The earliest recorded white settlement in the Fairfield district is described in William Bradley's Journal where he noted an expedition from Rose Hill to Prospect Creek to determine whether Prospect Creek led to Botany Bay.

The Battle of Parramatta, a major battle of the Hawkesbury and Nepean Wars, occurred in March 1797 where resistance leader Pemulwuy led a group of Bidjigal warriors, estimated to be at least 100, in an attack on a government farm at Toongabbie, challenging the British Army to fight. On 4 March 1804 Irish convicts rose up in Rouse Hill as one, in what was to become known as the Castle Hill convict rebellion.

Governor Lachlan Macquarie and Mrs Macquarie preferred the clean air of rural Parramatta to the unsanitary and crime-ridden streets of Sydney and transformed Old Government House, Parramatta, into an elegant Palladian-style home in the English manner. Originally constructed under Governor Hunter in 1799 to reflect the economic importance of the Parramatta district, the building remains today Australia's oldest public building and was given World Heritage Listing by UNESCO in 2010.

In 1803 a government stock farm was established in what was to become the Riverstone/Marsden Park area, on the basis of the abundant water supply and good grazing land there, and also in Smithfield, due to its good soil and dependable water supply. Windsor is the fourth-oldest place of British settlement on the Australian continent, where European settlers utilised the fertile river flats for agriculture. Governor Phillip Gidley King began granting land in the area to settlers in 1804 with Captain Daniel Woodriff's 1,000 acres (4.0 km^{2}) on the banks of the river the first land grant in the area.

=== Urban development ===
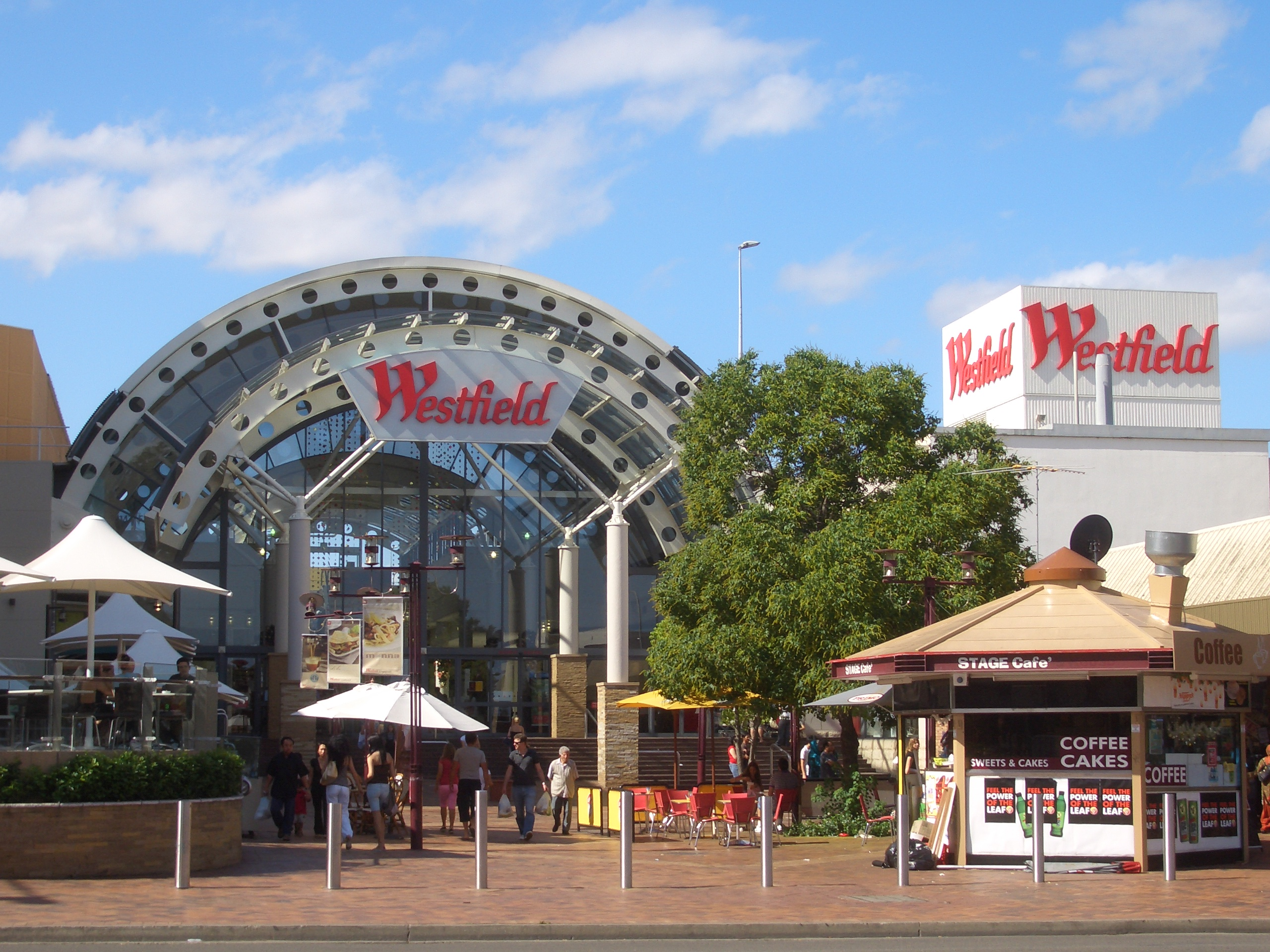
Liverpool

Liverpool Hospital was founded on a portion of land beside the Georges River, making it the second oldest hospital in Australia. Fairfield railway station was opened in 1856 and has the oldest surviving railway building in New South Wales. Quarrying in the Prospect area began in the 1820s and naturalist Charles Darwin visited Prospect Hill in January 1836, to observe the geology. Designed and constructed by the NSW Public Works Department, Prospect Reservoir was built as Sydney's main water supply in the 1880s. The Upper Nepean Scheme was commenced in 1880 after it was realised that the Botany Swamps scheme was insufficient to meet Sydney's water supply needs. By the latter part of the nineteenth century coarse-grained picrite, and other dolorite rock types were being extracted from William Lawson's estate on the west and north sides of Prospect Hill.

Lansvale was a popular recreational site of the early 20th century due to its waterways and meadows. During World War II, Bankstown Airport was established as a key strategic air base to support the war effort and the control of Bankstown Airport was handed to US Forces. Campbelltown was designated in the early 1960s as a satellite city by the New South Wales Planning Authority, and a regional capital for the south west of Sydney. Until the 1950s, Liverpool was still a satellite town with an agricultural economy based on poultry farming and market gardening. However the urban sprawl of Sydney across the Cumberland Plain soon reached Liverpool, and it became an outer suburb of metropolitan Sydney with a strong working-class presence and manufacturing facilities. In the 1950s and 1960s, there was a large amount of suburban development both in the current suburb of Blacktown and the new suburbs that sprung up around it, which led to civic development in the town centre with the Blacktown Hospital opening in 1965.

=== Migrant communities ===
In the 1960s and 1970s, migration from south-east Asia as a result of the Vietnam War transformed Cabramatta into a thriving Asian community. Also in the 1970s, an influx of Middle Eastern immigrants, namely Lebanese people, settled in Lidcombe, Bankstown and the surrounding suburbs. Opened in December 1985, in Eastern Creek, Wonderland Sydney was the largest amusement park in the southern hemisphere until its closure in 2004.

In 2015, the Abbott government granted 12,000 extra humanitarian visas to persecuted Christians, largely the Assyrians, in war-torn Middle Eastern countries such as Iraq. They were admitted to Australia as part of its one-off humanitarian intake, with half of them primarily settling in Fairfield and also Liverpool.

Western Sydney is also the urban area with the largest diaspora of Mandaeans in the world. Mandaeans in Western Sydney have migrated from both Iraq and Iran. Mandaeans primarily live in Liverpool, Fairfield, Campbelltown, and surrounding areas of western Sydney.

== Geography ==
=== Topography ===
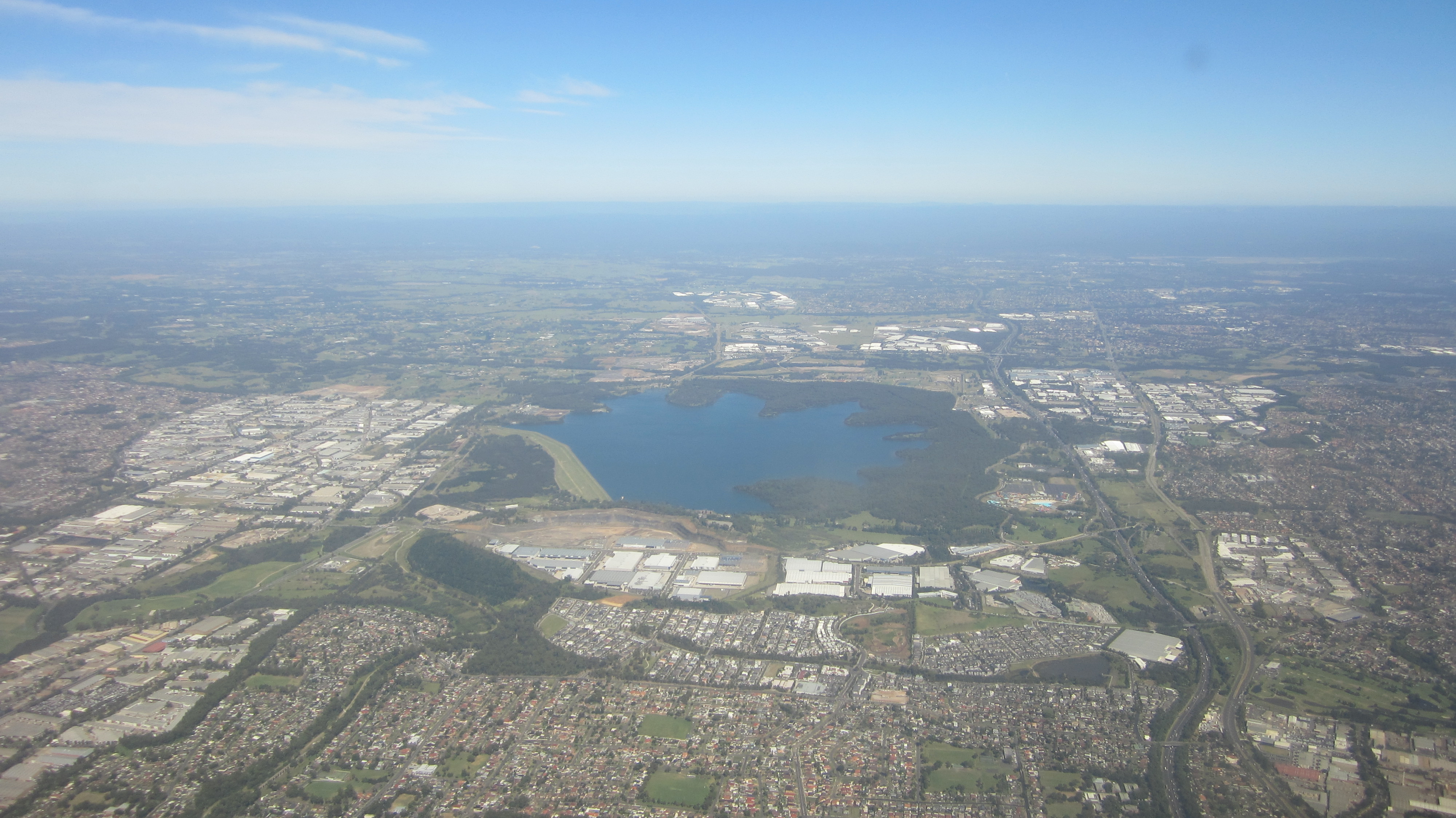
Aerial view of suburbs surrounding Prospect Reservoir (looking west towards the Blue Mountains)

The Greater Western Sydney region spans from Windsor in the north to Campbelltown in the south, Lidcombe and Roselands in the east, with the A3 creating the boundary between the greater west and inner West, to Penrith and Katoomba in the Blue Mountains in the far west. The Greater Western Sydney region borders regions that are outside of the Greater Sydney area such as the Central West to the west, the Southern Highlands to the southwest, the Hunter to the northwest, the Central Coast to the northeast and the Illawarra to the southeast. The 151st meridian east passes through the heart of western Sydney, namely in the suburbs of Castle Hill, Parramatta, Granville, and Revesby, with the suburbs west of those being on the eastern end of the 150th meridian, which is a line that passes through the Russian city of Magadan in the northern hemisphere.

In the 1820s, Peter Cunningham described the country west of Parramatta and Liverpool as "a fine timbered country, perfectly clear of bush, through which you might, generally speaking, drive a gig in all directions, without any impediment in the shape of rocks, scrubs, or close forest". This confirmed earlier accounts by Governor Arthur Phillip, who suggested that the trees were "growing at a distance of some twenty to forty feet from each other, and in general entirely free from brushwood..."

Greater western Sydney predominantly lies on the Cumberland Plain and is relatively flat in contrast to the above regions. The region is situated on a rain shadow, due to the Hills District to the northeast, where it tends to be drier than the coast and less lush than the hilly Northern Suburbs. Though Wetherill Park was listed by Domain as one of the five most leafiest suburbs in Sydney, in addition to being the only suburb in Western Sydney to be listed as such.

Although the region is relatively flat, several elevated areas on the plain exist – Western Sydney Parklands, one of the largest parklands in the world, and Prospect Hill, the only area in Sydney with ancient volcanic activity, are between 120 and 140 metres (390 and 460 ft) high. Highly elevated suburbs, which typically range between 70 and 100 metres (230 and 330 ft) in height, include Leppington and Oran Park to the southwest, Pemulwuy, Cecil Hills and Horsley Park to the greater west, and Greystanes, Seven Hills and Mount Druitt to the northwest.

=== Ecology ===
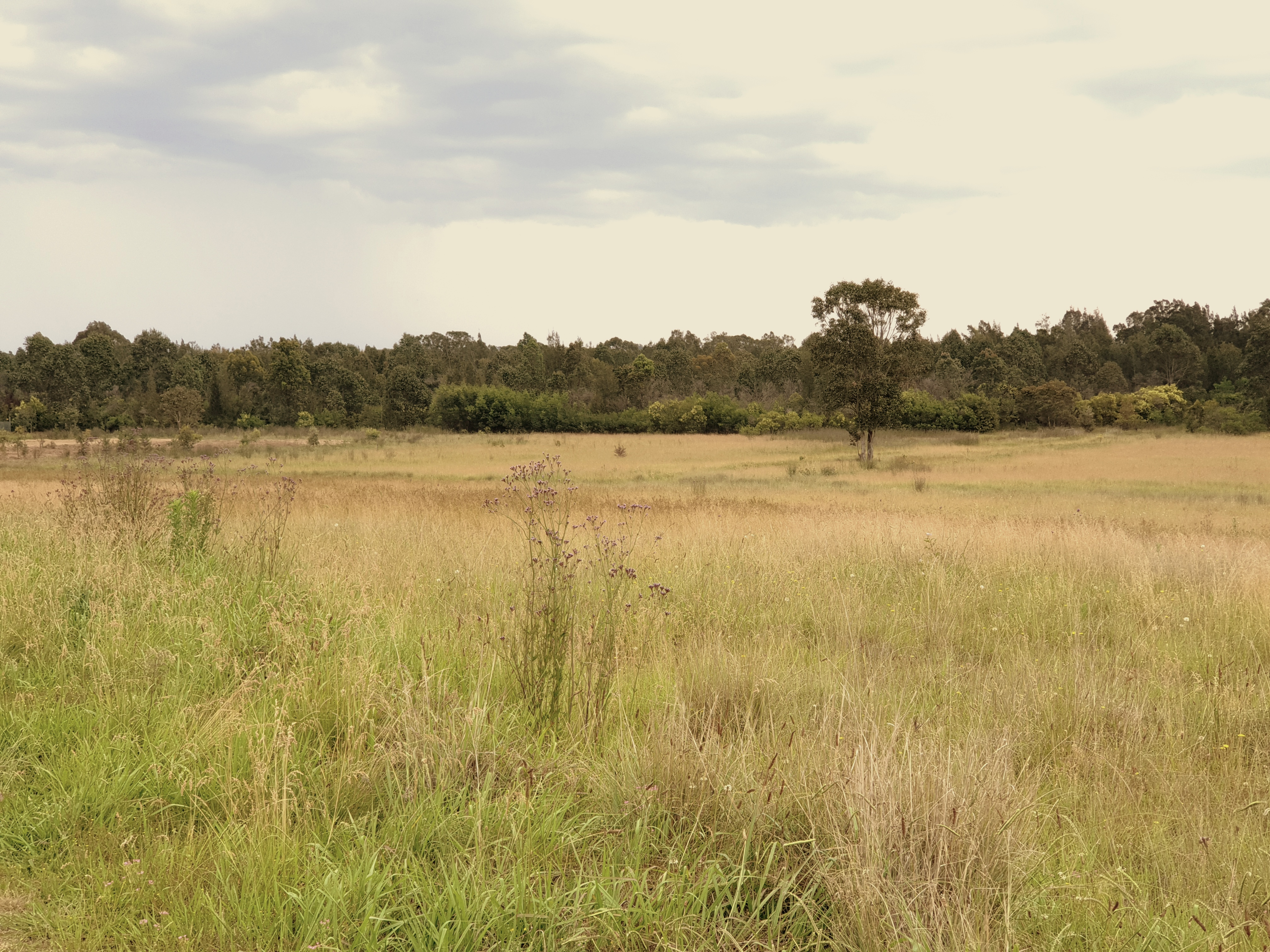
A grassy woodland in Bungaribee (Blacktown)

The main plant communities in the Greater Western Sydney region are sclerophyll grassy woodlands (i.e. savannas), dry sclerophyll forests and small pockets of wet sclerophyll forests to the northeast as one approaches the Hornsby Plateau. The grassy woodlands contain eucalyptus trees which are usually in open woodlands that have sclerophyllous shrubs and sparse grass in the understory, reminiscent of Mediterranean forests. It has been calculated that around 98,000 hectares of native vegetation remains in the Sydney metropolitan area, about half of what is likely to have been existing at the time of European arrival.

The endemic flora is home to a variety of bird, insect, reptile and mammal species, which are conspicuous in urban areas. Introduced birds such as the house sparrow, common myna and feral pigeon are ubiquitous in the CBD areas of Sydney. Possums, bandicoots, rabbits, feral cats, lizards, snakes and frogs may also be present in the urban environment, albeit seldom in city centres.

=== Geology ===
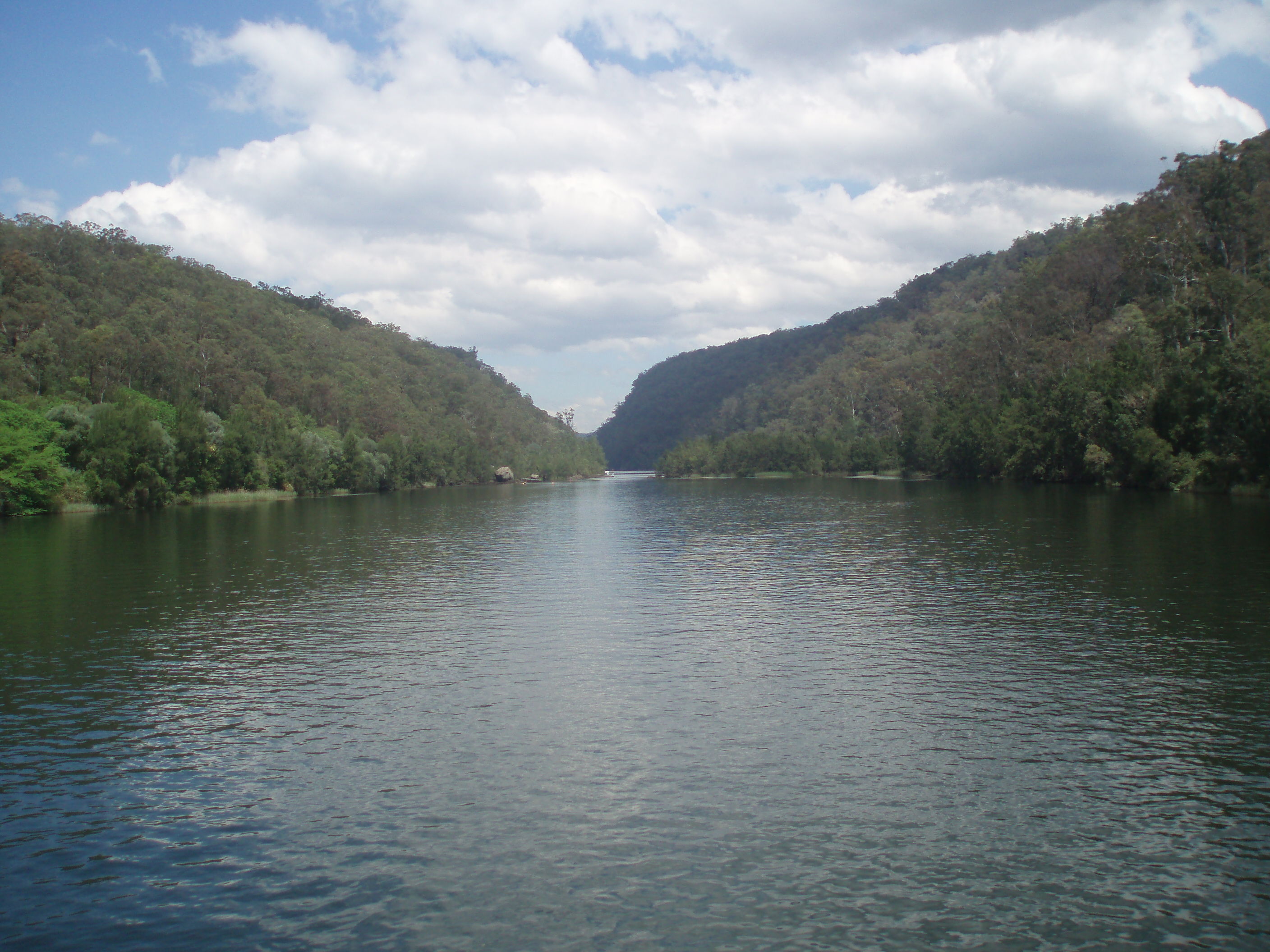
Most of Sydney's water storages are on tributaries of the Nepean River.

The Sydney area lies on Triassic shales and sandstones with low rolling hills and wide valleys in a rain shadow area. Sydney sprawls over two major regions: the Cumberland Plain, a relatively flat region lying to the west of Sydney Harbour, and the Hornsby Plateau, a plateau north of the Harbour rising to 200 metres and dissected by steep valleys. Sydney's native plant species are predominantly eucalyptus trees. The moderately-fertile Soils in western Sydney are usually red and yellow in texture as they are rich in clay, are fine-textured and acidic. Soil moisture is relatively high through the months reaching a peak in winter (due to the lower evaporation rate), despite the lower rainfall in that season.

At a time in the past, monocline formed to the west of Sydney. The monocline is a sloping bend that raises the sandstone well above where it is expected to be seen, and this is why the whole of the visible top of the Blue Mountains is made of sandstone. Sandstone slopes in the Sydney area are on three sides: to the west the Blue Mountains, and to the north and south, the Hornsby and Woronora plateau. The centre of the Sydney basin is located beneath Fairfield. Bringelly Shale and Minchinbury Sandstone are often seen in the greater western parts of Sydney, which are part of the Wianamatta Shale group. The Prospect dolerite intrusion in Pemulwuy is the largest assemblage of igneous rock in Sydney. The oval-shaped ridge was made many millions of years ago when volcanic material from the Earth's upper mantle moved upwards and then sideways.

Swamps and lagoons are existent on the floodplain of the Nepean River, one being Bents Basin, which is also a recreational area. Parramatta River drains a large area of Sydney's western suburbs. With 5,005,400 inhabitants (as of 2016) and an urban population density of 2037 people per square kilometre, Sydney's urban area covers 1,788 square kilometres (690 sq mi), comprising 35% of Sydney and is constantly growing. The south and southwest of Sydney is drained by the Georges River, flowing north from its source near Appin, towards Liverpool and then turning east towards Botany Bay. Minor waterways draining Sydney's western suburbs include South Creek and Eastern Creek, flowing into the Hawkesbury, and Prospect Creek draining into the Georges River. Cowan Creek and Berowra Creek run north from the Upper North Shore to the Hawkesbury river.

== Climate ==
Western Sydney experiences a humid subtropical climate (Köppen climate classification: Cfa) with the annual temperatures having an average maximum of 23 °C (73 °F) and a minimum of 12 °C (54 °F), making the region a few degrees warmer than the Sydney CBD. Maximum summer temperatures average at around 27 to 31 °C (81 to 88 °F) and winter temperatures are mild, averaging at around 16 to 20 °C (61 to 68 °F), depending on the location. Autumn and spring are the transitional seasons, with spring showing a larger variation than autumn in terms of temperatures.

Rainfall is almost evenly spread throughout the year, although the first few months tend to be wetter, namely February through to April. The months from July through to December tend to be drier (late winter through to early summers). Thunderstorms are common in late summer and early autumn. Winters are pleasantly cool and relatively sunny (especially August), although east coast lows can bring large amounts of rainfall, especially in June. Most suburbs in the west have an annual precipitation that averages at around 700 to 900 mm (28 to 35 in), in contrast to Sydney CBD's 1,217 mm (48 in).

Sydney usually experiences a föhn effect that originates from the Great Dividing Range, where the lifting of winds on the windward side of the Blue Mountains forces the air to gradually warm up and lose moisture as the winds descend into the Sydney basin. They may exacerbate fire danger in the warm months, although they usually tend to occur between late winter and early spring when westerly cold fronts become more frequent and would therefore be blocked by the ranges – This phenomenon thereby permits the late winter and early spring period to feature the highest amount of clear days in the year. It should be worth noting that Richmond features the greatest temperature range ever recorded in Australia; −8.3 °C (17.1 °F) to 47.8 °C (118.0 °F).

Summer

Western Sydney is much warmer than Sydney city in summer. During this time, daytime temperatures can be 5 °C (9 °F) warmer than the city (in extreme cases the West can even be 10 °C (18 °F) hotter). This is because sea breezes in the City do not penetrate the inland areas. Northwesterlies occasionally bring hot winds from the desert that raise temperatures as high as 40 °C (104 °F). Though southerly busters may still end the hot conditions. The humidity in the summer is usually in the comfortable range, though some days can be slightly humid (due to the ocean proximity) or very dry (due to the heat from the desert).

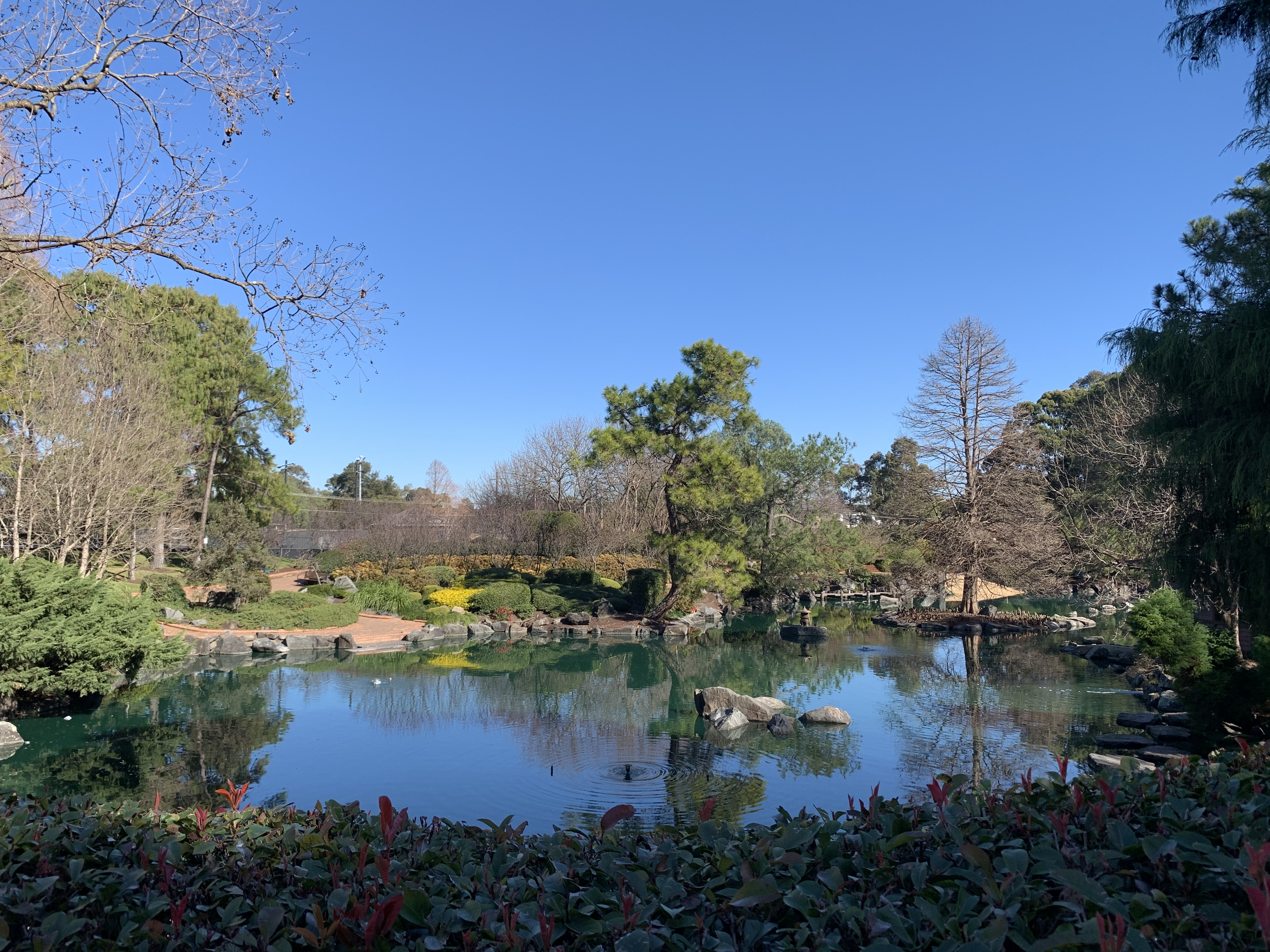
The Auburn Botanic Gardens in winter

Autumn

In early autumn, hot days are possible, with temperatures above 37 °C (99 °F) possible in March, but quite rare. April is cooler, with days above 30 °C (86 °F) happening on average only 1.1 times during the month. Days cooler than 20 °C (68 °F) occur more regularly leading into May. In May, days are usually mild, ranging from 17 to 24 °C (63 to 75 °F), but can get quite cold, with maximums of 17 °C (63 °F) or lower starting to occur. Average minimums fall throughout the season, with the first night below 10 °C (50 °F) often occurring in April.

Winter

Winter temperatures often show a higher variation in late winter than early winter, with a day in August rarely reaching above 26 °C (79 °F), which is unknown in June and July. Winter daytime average around between 15 and 20 °C (59 and 68 °F) and sometimes below 15 °C (59 °F) during the daytime can occur. Winter nights average 6.9 °C (44.4 °F), although a few nights per year see temperatures fall below 2 °C (36 °F), mostly in July. Nights reaching below 0 °C (32 °F) more often occur in the far-western suburbs, such as Campbelltown, Camden, Penrith and Richmond. These low temperatures often occur when the night sky is clear and the ground can radiate heat back into the atmosphere. Winter nights, though, are typically a few degrees cooler and frost is not uncommon in some areas, especially those in the far west such as Penrith and Richmond.

Spring

Spring temperatures are highly variable, with temperatures fluctuating quite often. September will normally see 1 day reaching above 30 °C (86 °F), and extremely rare, above 35 °C (95 °F). Cool days in September can occur, occasionally failing to reach 15 °C (59 °F). October and November show high variability, where hot north-westerlies can cause temperatures to rise above 35 °C (95 °F), and even above 40 °C (104 °F) in November, while cool days below 20 °C (68 °F) are also quite common. The average minimum temperature increases throughout the season, September can still have nights falling below 5 °C (41 °F). October and November occasionally have nights falling below 10 °C (50 °F).

=== Climate data ===
Climate data for Parramatta
Month	Jan	Feb	Mar	Apr	May	Jun	Jul	Aug	Sep	Oct	Nov	Dec	Year
Record high °C (°F)	45.5 (113.9)	41.9 (107.4)	40.5 (104.9)	37.0 (98.6)	29.2 (84.6)	25.5 (77.9)	25.9 (78.6)	30.6 (87.1)	35.4 (95.7)	40.1 (104.2)	42.7 (108.9)	43.9 (111.0)	45.5 (113.9)
Mean daily maximum °C (°F)	28.4 (83.1)	27.8 (82.0)	26.2 (79.2)	23.8 (74.8)	20.5 (68.9)	17.8 (64.0)	17.3 (63.1)	19.0 (66.2)	21.6 (70.9)	23.9 (75.0)	25.4 (77.7)	27.4 (81.3)	23.3 (73.9)
Mean daily minimum °C (°F)	17.5 (63.5)	17.6 (63.7)	15.8 (60.4)	12.8 (55.0)	9.9 (49.8)	7.5 (45.5)	6.2 (43.2)	7.1 (44.8)	9.3 (48.7)	11.9 (53.4)	14.0 (57.2)	16.2 (61.2)	12.2 (54.0)
Record low °C (°F)	10.1 (50.2)	9.2 (48.6)	6.8 (44.2)	4.0 (39.2)	1.4 (34.5)	0.8 (33.4)	−1.0 (30.2)	0.7 (33.3)	0.7 (33.3)	3.6 (38.5)	4.0 (39.2)	7.7 (45.9)	−1.0 (30.2)
Average precipitation mm (inches)	102.3 (4.03)	126.0 (4.96)	109.0 (4.29)	89.8 (3.54)	72.4 (2.85)	86.2 (3.39)	46.8 (1.84)	54.4 (2.14)	53.9 (2.12)	69.1 (2.72)	85.2 (3.35)	70.9 (2.79)	965.6 (38.02)
Average precipitation days	12.0	12.1	12.5	9.2	9.9	10.5	8.2	7.9	8.0	10.3	11.6	10.3	122.5

Climate data for Bankstown Airport
Month	Jan	Feb	Mar	Apr	May	Jun	Jul	Aug	Sep	Oct	Nov	Dec	Year
Record high °C (°F)	44.8 (112.6)	43.3 (109.9)	41.6 (106.9)	36.9 (98.4)	28.5 (83.3)	25.4 (77.7)	26.7 (80.1)	30.2 (86.4)	35.6 (96.1)	39.7 (103.5)	43.1 (109.6)	43.6 (110.5)	44.8 (112.6)
Mean daily maximum °C (°F)	28.2 (82.8)	27.8 (82.0)	26.2 (79.2)	23.7 (74.7)	20.4 (68.7)	17.7 (63.9)	17.2 (63.0)	18.9 (66.0)	21.5 (70.7)	23.7 (74.7)	25.1 (77.2)	27.3 (81.1)	23.1 (73.6)
Mean daily minimum °C (°F)	18.1 (64.6)	18.1 (64.6)	16.2 (61.2)	12.7 (54.9)	9.6 (49.3)	6.6 (43.9)	5.1 (41.2)	6.0 (42.8)	8.7 (47.7)	11.8 (53.2)	14.3 (57.7)	16.6 (61.9)	12.0 (53.6)
Record low °C (°F)	10.4 (50.7)	10.0 (50.0)	7.8 (46.0)	2.4 (36.3)	1.3 (34.3)	−1.9 (28.6)	−4.0 (24.8)	−0.7 (30.7)	0.0 (32.0)	4.4 (39.9)	6.8 (44.2)	6.3 (43.3)	−4.0 (24.8)
Average precipitation mm (inches)	90.3 (3.56)	106.4 (4.19)	97.7 (3.85)	83.2 (3.28)	71.1 (2.80)	73.1 (2.88)	44.6 (1.76)	49.1 (1.93)	44.7 (1.76)	62.1 (2.44)	77.2 (3.04)	67.2 (2.65)	867.0 (34.13)
Average precipitation days	11.1	10.9	11.3	8.8	9.8	9.3	8.0	7.3	7.7	9.5	11.0	9.8	114.5

Climate data for Prospect Reservoir
Month	Jan	Feb	Mar	Apr	May	Jun	Jul	Aug	Sep	Oct	Nov	Dec	Year
Record high °C (°F)	44.7 (112.5)	42.5 (108.5)	39.5 (103.1)	37.1 (98.8)	29.4 (84.9)	25.6 (78.1)	26.5 (79.7)	29.4 (84.9)	35.0 (95.0)	39.0 (102.2)	42.0 (107.6)	42.7 (108.9)	44.7 (112.5)
Mean daily maximum °C (°F)	28.4 (83.1)	27.9 (82.2)	26.3 (79.3)	23.6 (74.5)	20.3 (68.5)	17.3 (63.1)	16.8 (62.2)	18.7 (65.7)	21.3 (70.3)	23.7 (74.7)	25.3 (77.5)	27.5 (81.5)	23.1 (73.6)
Mean daily minimum °C (°F)	17.6 (63.7)	17.7 (63.9)	16.1 (61.0)	13.0 (55.4)	10.0 (50.0)	7.4 (45.3)	6.1 (43.0)	6.8 (44.2)	9.4 (48.9)	12.1 (53.8)	14.2 (57.6)	16.4 (61.5)	12.2 (54.0)
Record low °C (°F)	10.0 (50.0)	10.8 (51.4)	7.9 (46.2)	3.6 (38.5)	1.2 (34.2)	−0.8 (30.6)	−0.6 (30.9)	−0.5 (31.1)	2.6 (36.7)	4.5 (40.1)	6.8 (44.2)	7.8 (46.0)	−0.8 (30.6)
Average precipitation mm (inches)	93.7 (3.69)	96.0 (3.78)	95.6 (3.76)	74.1 (2.92)	72.0 (2.83)	74.9 (2.95)	57.0 (2.24)	50.3 (1.98)	47.1 (1.85)	59.4 (2.34)	72.4 (2.85)	75.2 (2.96)	868.1 (34.18)
Average precipitation days	10.7	10.6	10.9	9.3	9.0	9.4	7.8	8.0	8.5	9.4	9.5	9.9	113.0

Climate data for Richmond
Month	Jan	Feb	Mar	Apr	May	Jun	Jul	Aug	Sep	Oct	Nov	Dec	Year
Record high °C (°F)	47.8 (118.0)	43.7 (110.7)	41.9 (107.4)	38.2 (100.8)	30.0 (86.0)	26.8 (80.2)	27.6 (81.7)	32.8 (91.0)	35.9 (96.6)	40.4 (104.7)	43.6 (110.5)	43.7 (110.7)	47.8 (118.0)
Mean daily maximum °C (°F)	30.0 (86.0)	29.1 (84.4)	26.8 (80.2)	23.9 (75.0)	20.6 (69.1)	17.9 (64.2)	17.4 (63.3)	19.7 (67.5)	22.7 (72.9)	25.0 (77.0)	26.7 (80.1)	28.5 (83.3)	24.0 (75.2)
Mean daily minimum °C (°F)	17.6 (63.7)	17.7 (63.9)	15.6 (60.1)	11.4 (52.5)	7.6 (45.7)	4.9 (40.8)	3.6 (38.5)	4.4 (39.9)	8.0 (46.4)	11.0 (51.8)	14.1 (57.4)	16.0 (60.8)	11.0 (51.8)
Record low °C (°F)	8.9 (48.0)	6.4 (43.5)	3.9 (39.0)	−0.4 (31.3)	−2.4 (27.7)	−6.7 (19.9)	−8.3 (17.1)	−4.0 (24.8)	−1.4 (29.5)	1.7 (35.1)	3.7 (38.7)	5.0 (41.0)	−8.3 (17.1)
Average precipitation mm (inches)	78.5 (3.09)	125.8 (4.95)	74.2 (2.92)	48.9 (1.93)	52.4 (2.06)	48.0 (1.89)	31.2 (1.23)	30.7 (1.21)	49.7 (1.96)	52.8 (2.08)	83.5 (3.29)	61.6 (2.43)	738.5 (29.07)
Source 1: (averages and records)
Source 2: (records only)

Climate data for Camden Airport
Month	Jan	Feb	Mar	Apr	May	Jun	Jul	Aug	Sep	Oct	Nov	Dec	Year
Record high °C (°F)	46.4 (115.5)	43.2 (109.8)	41.0 (105.8)	38.5 (101.3)	27.5 (81.5)	24.9 (76.8)	25.4 (77.7)	30.2 (86.4)	36.0 (96.8)	40.5 (104.9)	42.6 (108.7)	43.1 (109.6)	46.4 (115.5)
Mean daily maximum °C (°F)	29.5 (85.1)	28.6 (83.5)	26.7 (80.1)	23.8 (74.8)	20.5 (68.9)	17.7 (63.9)	17.2 (63.0)	19.0 (66.2)	21.9 (71.4)	24.1 (75.4)	26.1 (79.0)	28.4 (83.1)	23.6 (74.5)
Mean daily minimum °C (°F)	16.8 (62.2)	16.8 (62.2)	14.8 (58.6)	11.0 (51.8)	7.0 (44.6)	4.5 (40.1)	3.0 (37.4)	3.8 (38.8)	6.7 (44.1)	9.9 (49.8)	12.9 (55.2)	15.1 (59.2)	10.2 (50.4)
Record low °C (°F)	7.9 (46.2)	7.2 (45.0)	5.9 (42.6)	−0.7 (30.7)	−2.2 (28.0)	−5.4 (22.3)	−6.0 (21.2)	−4.0 (24.8)	−1.8 (28.8)	1.3 (34.3)	3.8 (38.8)	5.7 (42.3)	−6.0 (21.2)
Average precipitation mm (inches)	77.9 (3.07)	100.9 (3.97)	85.8 (3.38)	66.9 (2.63)	57.4 (2.26)	59.0 (2.32)	38.7 (1.52)	42.4 (1.67)	39.6 (1.56)	65.3 (2.57)	77.0 (3.03)	54.9 (2.16)	767.3 (30.21)
Average precipitation days (≥ 0.2 mm)	10.1	10.9	10.3	9.2	8.7	8.7	8.1	7.6	7.9	9.8	10.6	9.0	110.9
Average relative humidity (%)	49	52	52	52	52	53	50	43	44	47	50	46	49

Climate data for Holsworthy Control Range
Month	Jan	Feb	Mar	Apr	May	Jun	Jul	Aug	Sep	Oct	Nov	Dec	Year
Record high °C (°F)	45.7 (114.3)	41.7 (107.1)	38.5 (101.3)	33.6 (92.5)	27.7 (81.9)	24.9 (76.8)	24.8 (76.6)	28.9 (84.0)	35.0 (95.0)	37.1 (98.8)	42.0 (107.6)	42.0 (107.6)	45.7 (114.3)
Mean daily maximum °C (°F)	29.1 (84.4)	28.3 (82.9)	26.3 (79.3)	23.5 (74.3)	20.5 (68.9)	17.8 (64.0)	17.3 (63.1)	19.1 (66.4)	22.3 (72.1)	24.1 (75.4)	25.5 (77.9)	27.4 (81.3)	23.4 (74.1)
Mean daily minimum °C (°F)	17.5 (63.5)	17.5 (63.5)	15.5 (59.9)	12.1 (53.8)	8.1 (46.6)	6.2 (43.2)	4.9 (40.8)	5.4 (41.7)	8.4 (47.1)	10.8 (51.4)	13.8 (56.8)	15.7 (60.3)	11.3 (52.3)
Record low °C (°F)	9.2 (48.6)	10.8 (51.4)	6.6 (43.9)	2.8 (37.0)	−2.0 (28.4)	−2.6 (27.3)	−4.0 (24.8)	−2.0 (28.4)	0.8 (33.4)	3.7 (38.7)	5.0 (41.0)	7.0 (44.6)	−4.0 (24.8)
Average precipitation mm (inches)	59.5 (2.34)	113.7 (4.48)	67.4 (2.65)	54.8 (2.16)	53.8 (2.12)	69.1 (2.72)	43.1 (1.70)	37.6 (1.48)	32.6 (1.28)	52.2 (2.06)	73.7 (2.90)	56.6 (2.23)	709.4 (27.93)
Average precipitation days (≥ 0.1mm)	8.7	10.3	11.1	11.2	10.0	10.6	10.1	7.4	7.5	9.5	11.9	10.5	118.8
Average relative humidity (%)	50	56	55	53	52	53	49	44	43	48	51	50	50

== Demographics ==
=== Languages ===
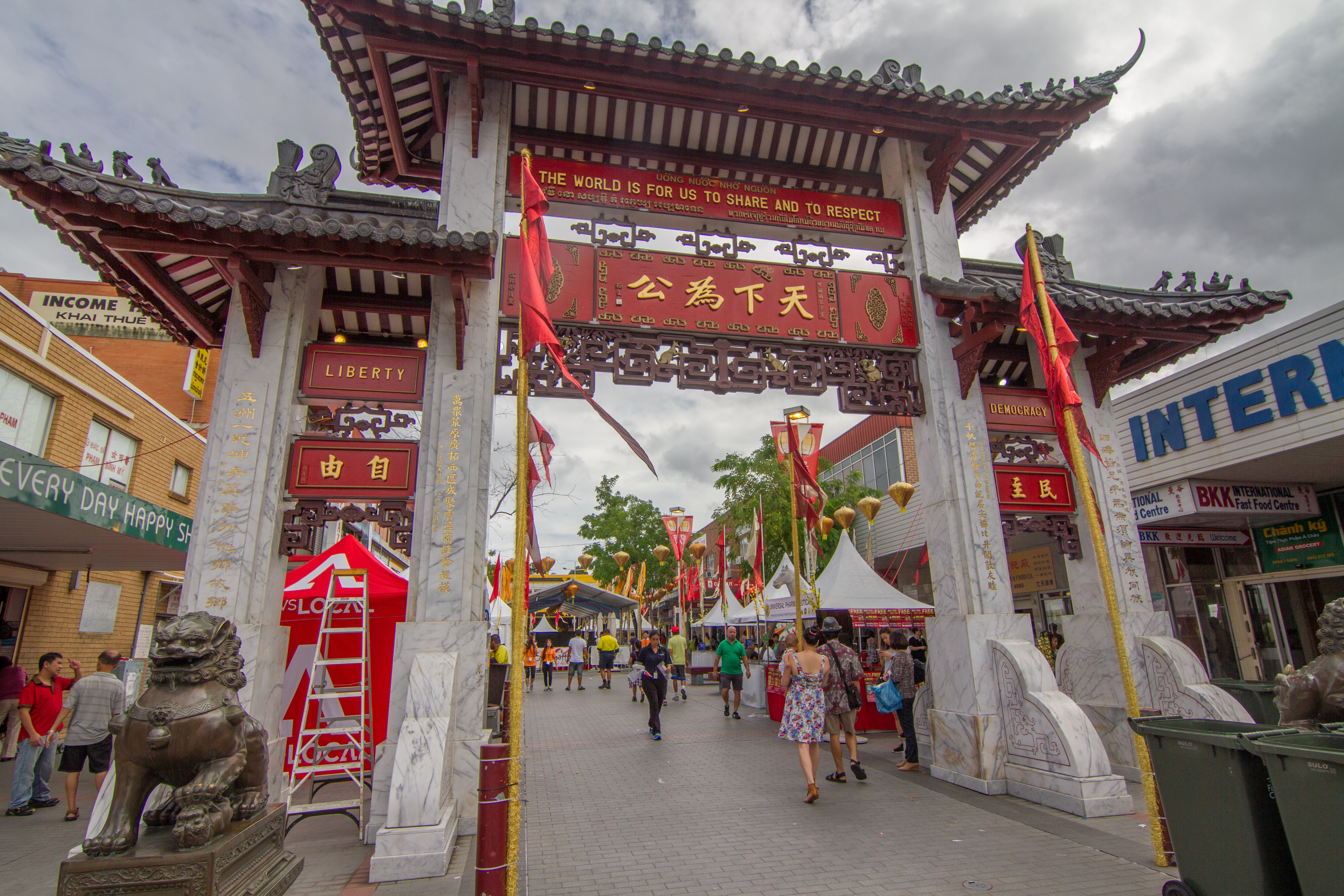
Paifang gate at a plaza in Cabramatta

The residents of GWS come from more than 170 countries and speak over 100 different languages. Cabramatta is made up of 87.7% of people from non-English speaking backgrounds, the highest anywhere in Australia (excluding remote indigenous communities). Other Western Sydney suburbs, such as Fairfield, Bankstown and Canley Vale, are also over 80%.

Although many of these communities are Australian-born (including Arabic speakers, with about 50% born therein), Western Sydney still is the main centre of Australian migration, with 60% of new arrivals settling in greater western Sydney in between 2006 and 2011, with the majority coming from India, China, Iraq, the Philippines and Vietnam. Furthermore, GWS also has more Indigenous Australian residents than either South Australia or Victoria, making it the largest indigenous community in Australia. These are some of the largest population groups of Australia's non-English speakers found in Western Sydney:

- 62% of Assyrian Neo-Aramaic speakers
- 50% of Akan speakers
- 48% of Lao speakers
- 45% of Arabic speakers
- 43% of Kurdish speakers
- 37% of Tongan speakers
- 34% of Samoan speakers
- 33% of Hindi speakers
- 29% of Vietnamese speakers
- 28% of Filipino/Tagalog speakers
- 28% of Tamil speakers
- 27% of Maltese speakers

Western Sydney also has the world's largest concentration of Neo-Mandaic speakers, almost all of whom are immigrants from Ahvaz, Iran. Many of them are members of the priestly Choheili family.

=== Religion ===
Western Sydney is the most religious and socially conservative region in Sydney. Previously, the districts of Ku-ring-gai Council, Hornsby Shire and The Hills Shire in the north were the most religious areas in Sydney, and were formerly known as being part of Sydney's "bible belt". Today however, the western suburbs have become Sydney's so-called believer belt, with a high proportion of believers found in a band of suburbs that span the cities of Liverpool, Fairfield, Cumberland and Canterbury-Bankstown.

According to the Bureau of Statistics, areas with the highest percentage of Christians were found in the western and south-western suburbs such as, Bossley Park (85%), Grasmere (82.3%), Theresa Park (81.1%), Abbotsbury (81%) and Horsley Park (79.6%), with the most popular denominations being Catholic and Anglican, respectively. The suburbs east of those, in the City of Canterbury-Bankstown and Camden Council, had a high amount of Islamic adherents, such as Lakemba (59.2%), South Granville (49%) and Old Guildford (45.9%).

Buddhism was the common response in the suburbs of Cabramatta, Canley Vale and Canley Heights, with 43.0%, 37.1% and 38.4% adhering to it, respectively. In Harris Park, to the northwest, Hinduism was the common religion with 44.8% of its inhabitants practicing it. Westmead (40.8%), Parramatta (28.5%) and Rosehill (24.0%) also had Hinduism as the most common faith.

Western Sydney has the world's largest concentration of Mandaean priests, who are responsible for overseeing rituals in Mandaeism. Mandaean mandis (temples) in Western Sydney include Ganzibra Dakhil Mandi, Yahya Yuhana Mandi, and Wallacia Mandi.

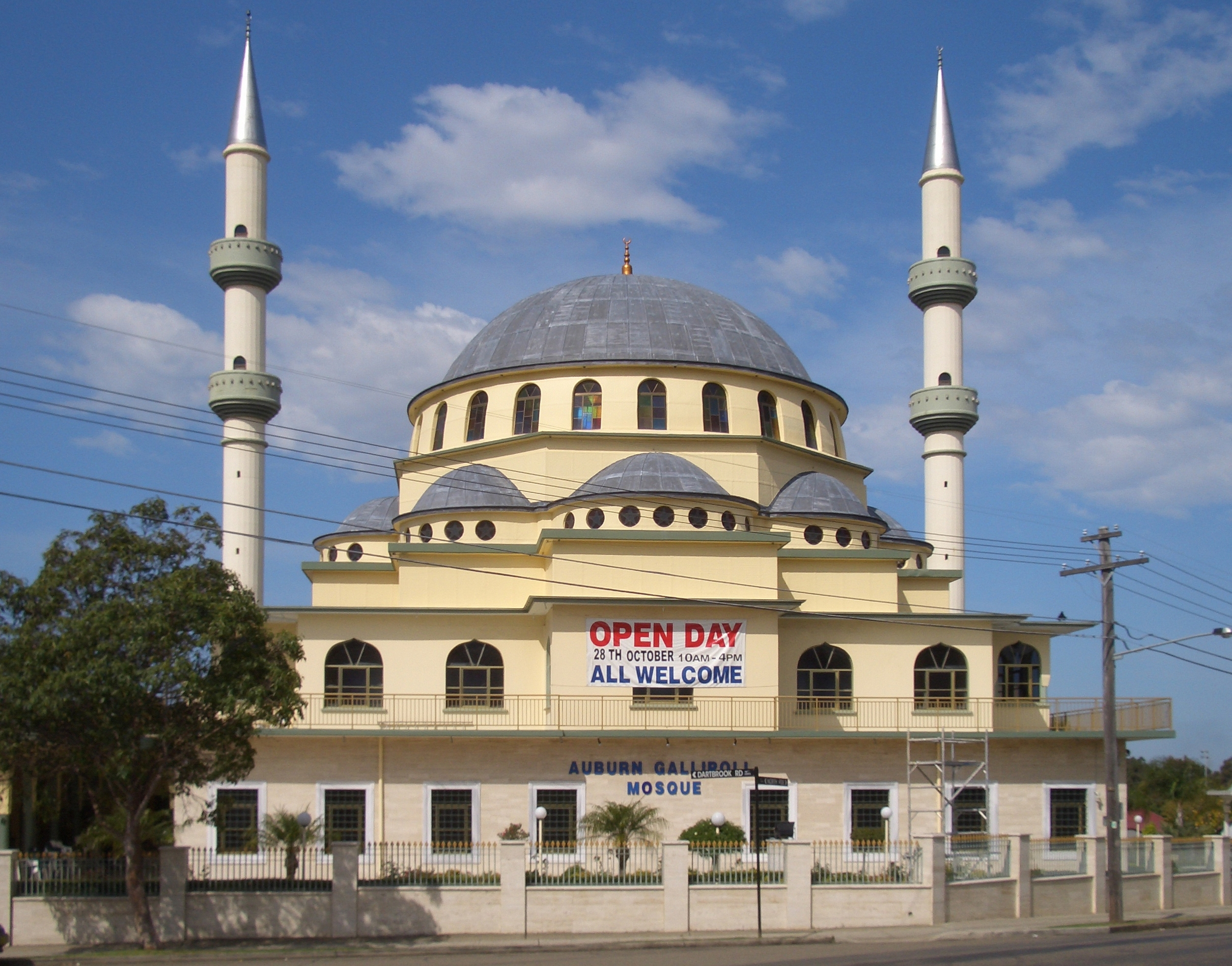
Auburn Gallipoli Mosque

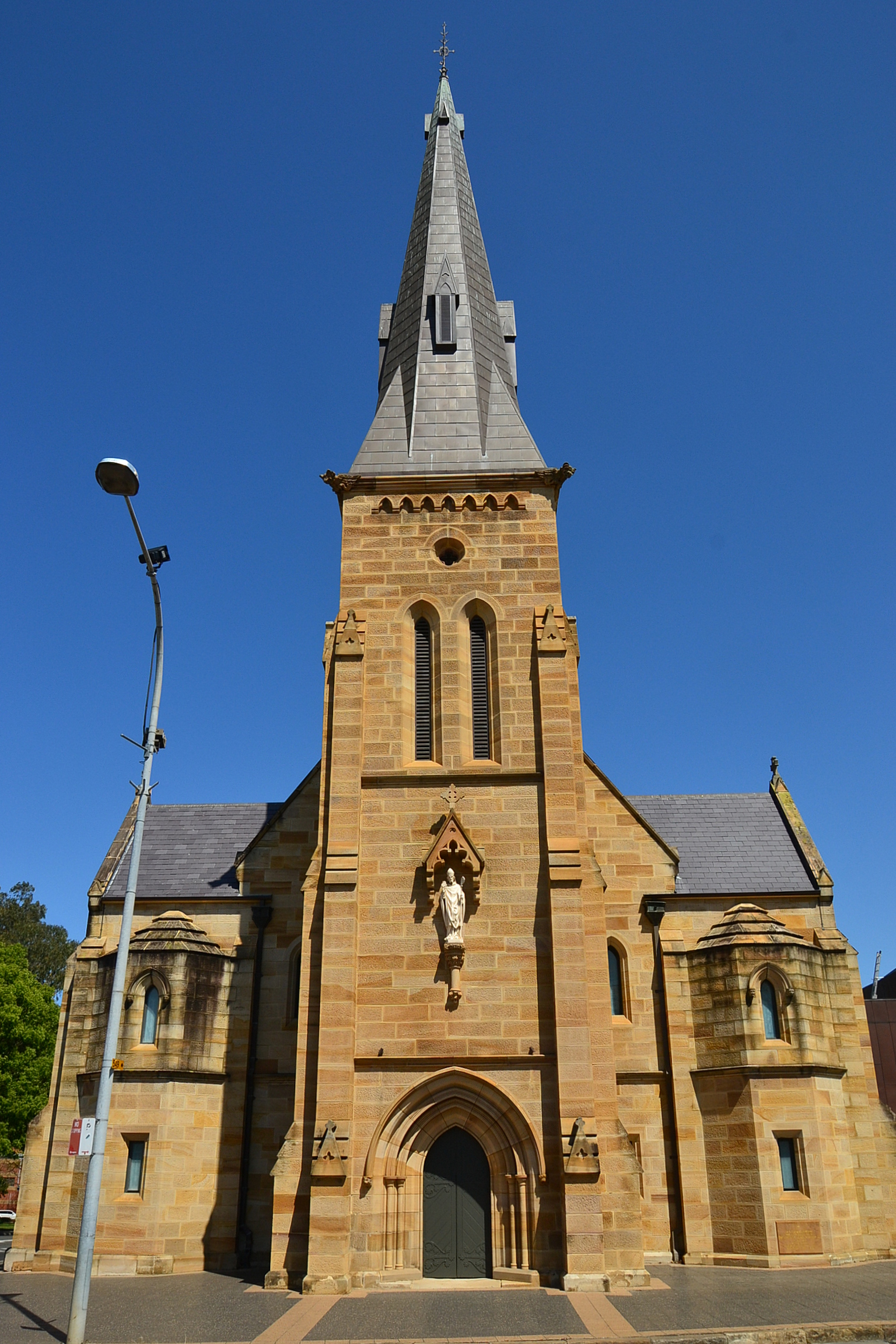
St Patrick's Cathedral

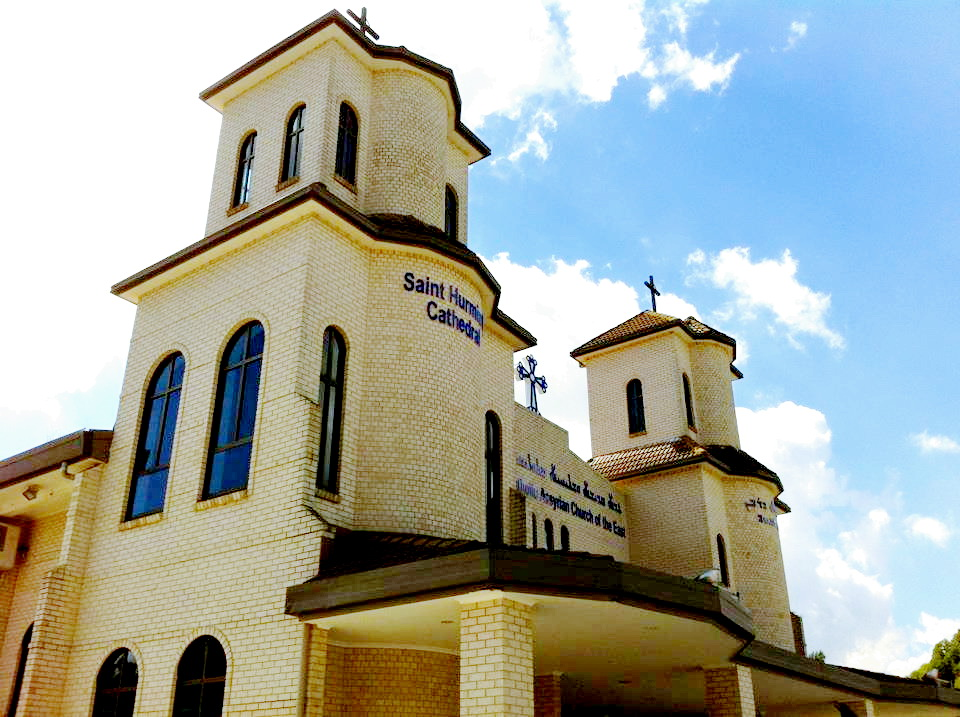
Assyrian Church of the East in Greenfield Park

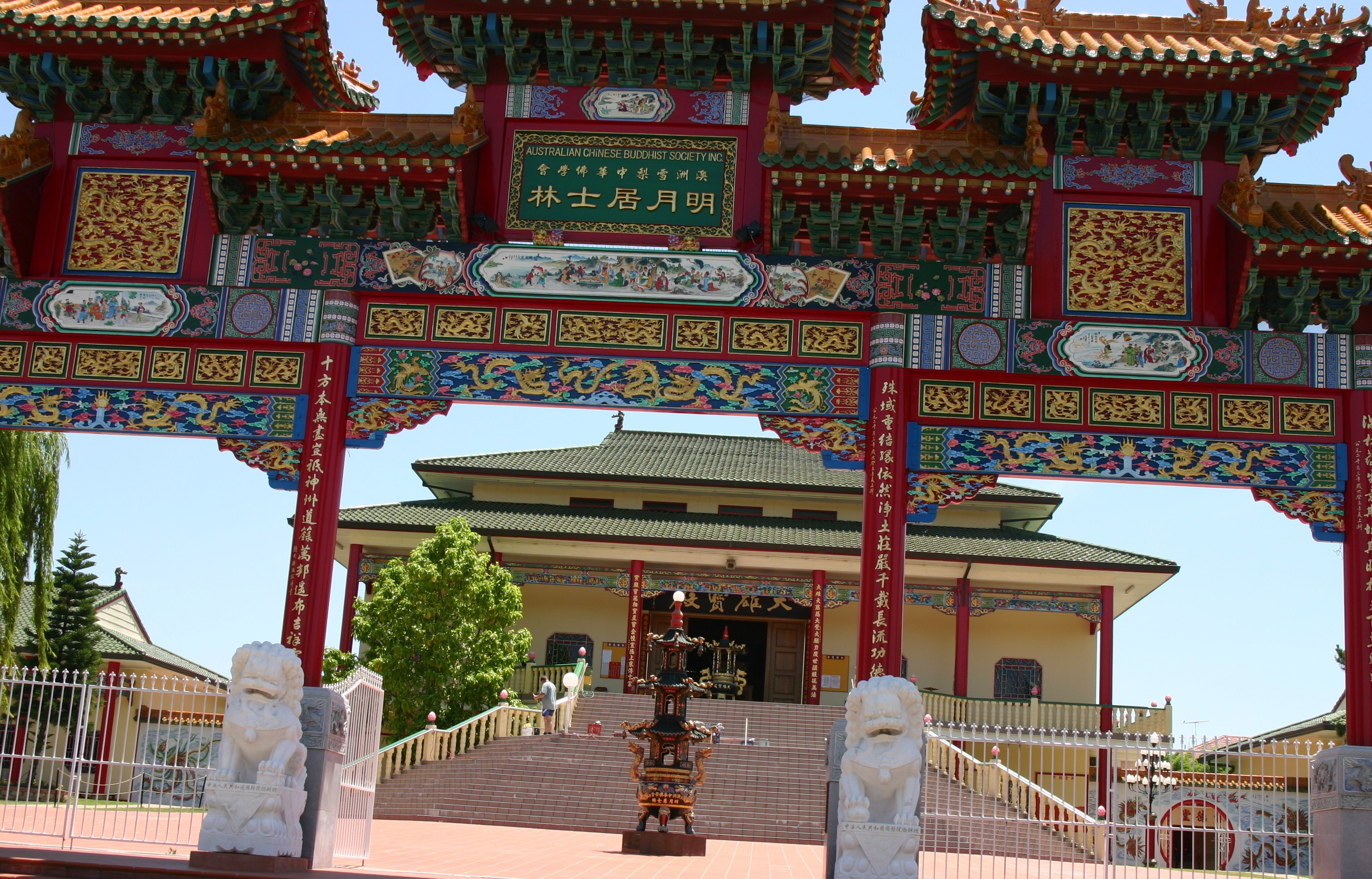
Buddhist temple in Bonnyrigg

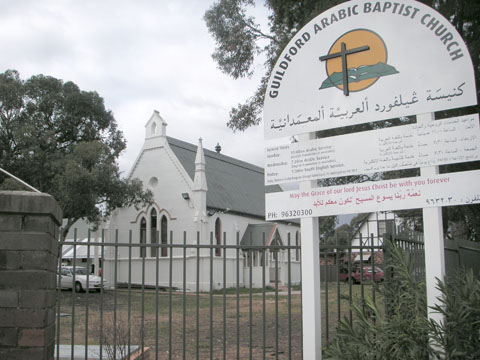
Arabic Baptist Church in Old Guildford

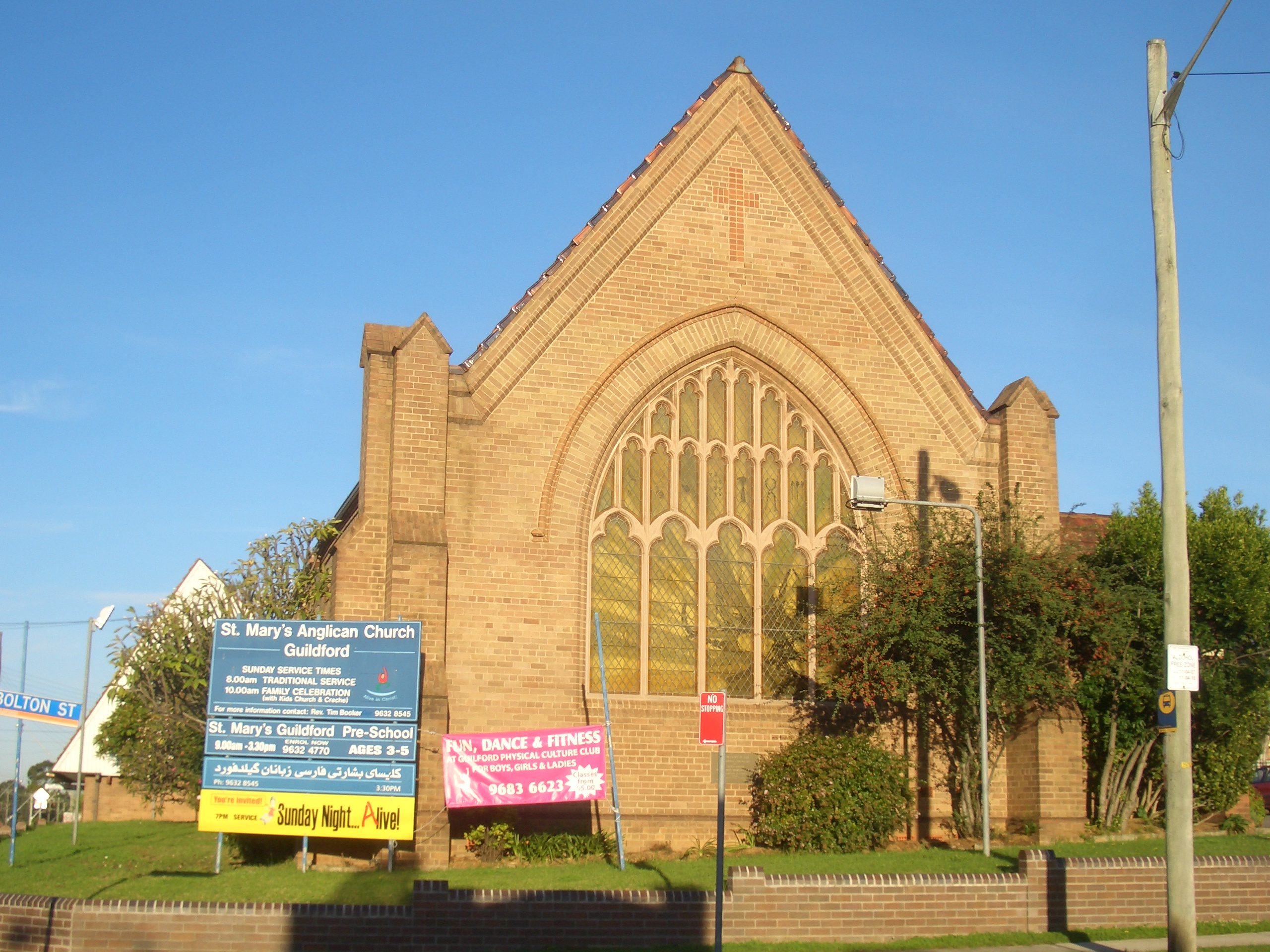
St Mary's Anglican Church in Guildford

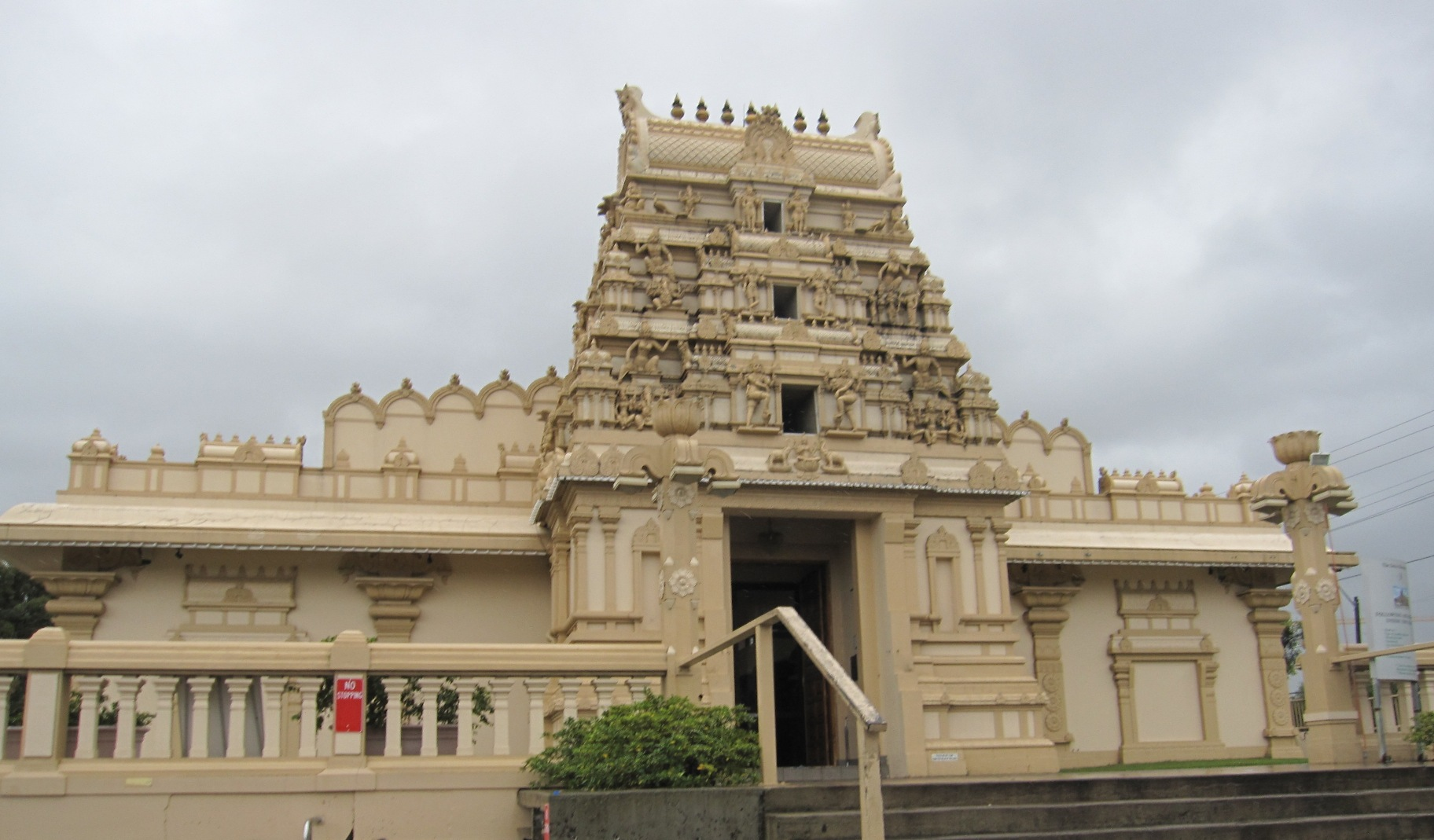
Sydney Murugan Temple, a Hindu temple in Mays Hill

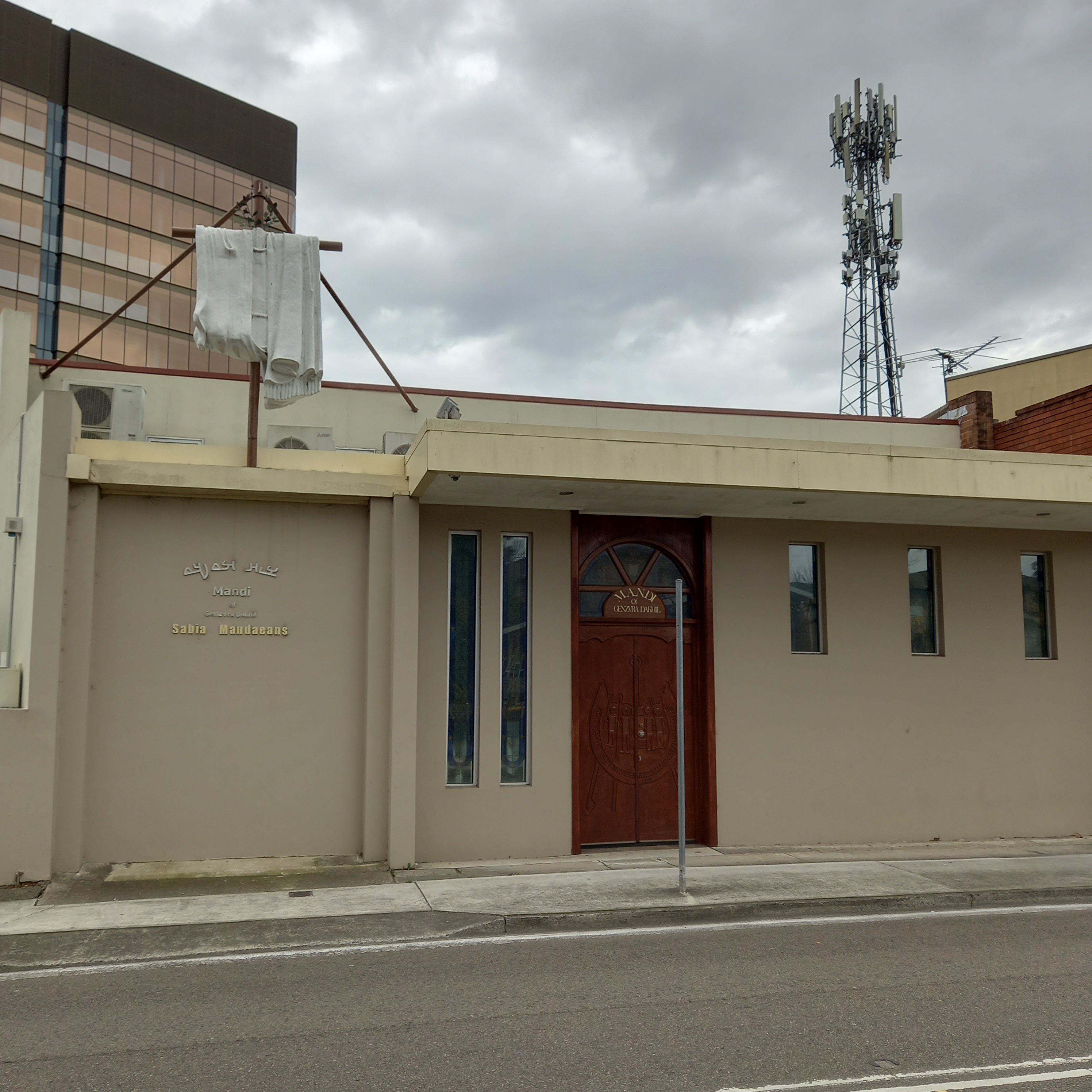
Ganzibra Dakhil Mandi in Liverpool

=== Society ===
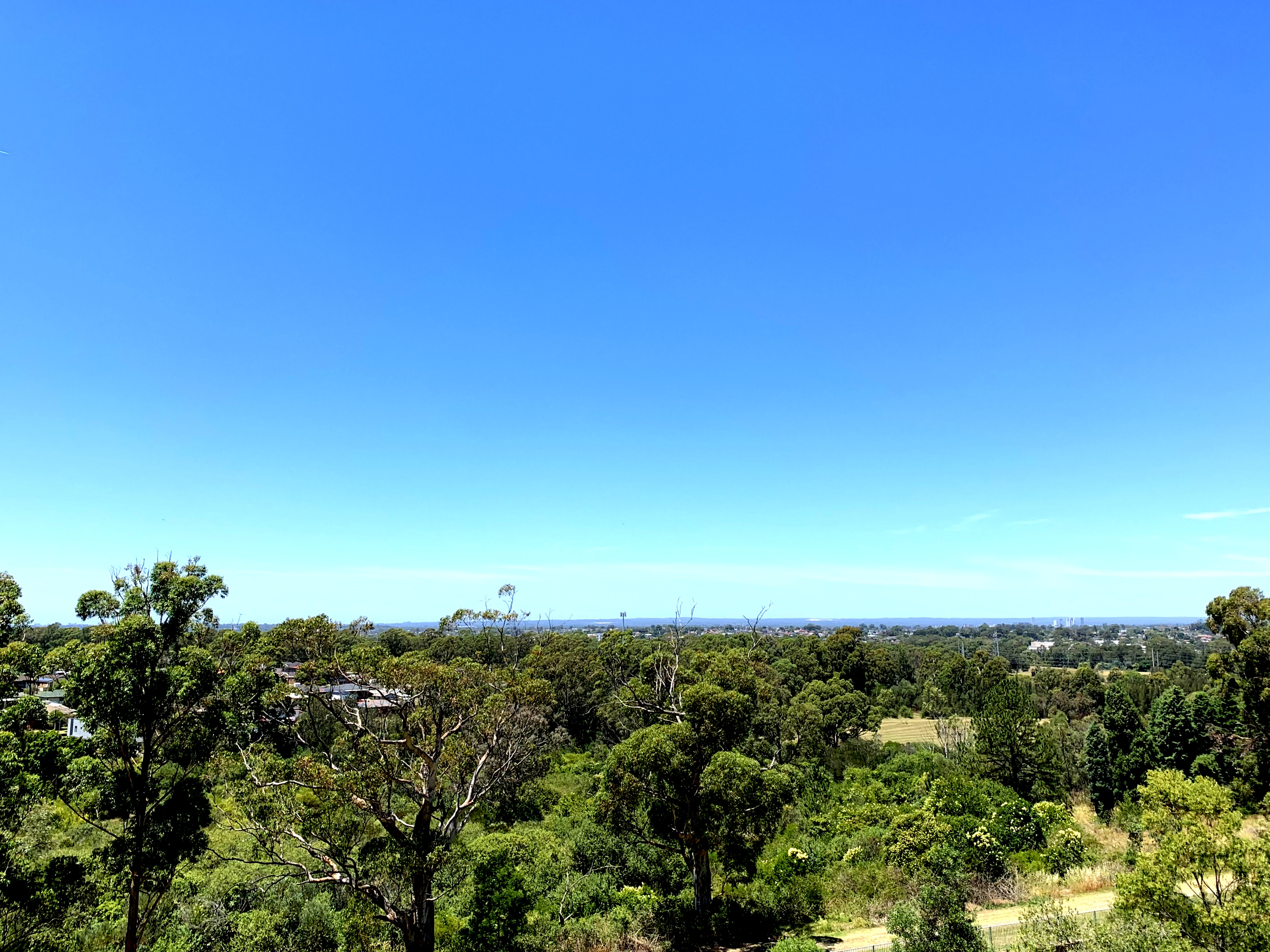
Bird's eye view of Greystanes, Smithfield, Wetherill Park and the Liverpool skyline

The region's major city centre is Parramatta, and the rest of the LGAs are growing immensely when it comes population, economic opportunity and environmental diversity. In the early 2010s, urban development has occurred in places like Camden, Campbelltown and Penrith, while Parramatta and Blacktown have grown rapidly. The GWS region overall grew at 2.1% in 2014 and 1.6% p.a. for the past decade. The South-West, such as, Leppington, spanning Liverpool, Camden and Campbelltown councils, had higher number of families. The region's population is projected to reach 3 million by 2036. The more recent suburban developments tend to be less leafy than more established Sydney neighbourhoods.

Home to around 1 in every 11 Australians, the 2 million inhabitants of GWS live in 743,940 dwellings with an average household size of 3.02. While Sydney CBD and the Inner West mostly consist of federation-era homes, the west usually features larger modern homes, which are predominantly found in the outer, newer suburbs, starting from the City of Fairfield and Blacktown and including Stanhope Gardens, Kellyville Ridge, and Bella Vista to the northwest, Bossley Park, Abbotsbury, and Cecil Hills to the west, and Hoxton Park, Harrington Park, and Oran Park to the southwest.

High school retention rates for years 7 to 12 are the lowest in the Sydney metropolitan area, recording 69.5% compared to 95.2% in Northern Sydney. In 2009, twice as many people in GWS aged 15 or older hadn't attended school at all compared to the rest of Sydney and NSW. The region has strong automobile dependency with consequent effects on air quality, health, quality of life and household budgets.

=== Regions ===
The Department of Planning and Infrastructure Metropolitan Strategy for Sydney divides Greater Western Sydney into three sub-regions:

Sub-region	Local government areas	Area		Population (2016 census)	Employment (2016 census)	Housing (2016 census)	Gross Regional Product (FY2010/2011)
Sub-region	Local government areas	km^{2}	sq mi	Population (2016 census)	Employment (2016 census)	Housing (2016 census)	Gross Regional Product (FY2010/2011)
West Central and North West	Canterbury-Bankstown, Parramatta, Cumberland Council	799	308	~846,000	~389,000	~302,000	A$48.5 billion
West	Blacktown, Blue Mountains, Hawkesbury, Penrith, The Hills	4,608	1,779	~327,000	~119,000	~127,000	A$13.0 billion
South West	Camden, Campbelltown, Fairfield, Liverpool, and Wollondilly	3,554	1,372	~829,000	~298,000	~286,000	A$33.5 billion
Totals		8,941	3,452	~2,002,000	~806,000	~715,000	A$95.0 billion

==== Western Sydney ====
Western Sydney as defined by the WSROC region covers 5,800 square kilometres (2,200 sq mi) and had an estimated resident population as at 30 June 2008 of 1,665,673. The region comprises the areas administered by the Blacktown City Council, Blue Mountains City Council, City of Canterbury-Bankstown, Cumberland Council, Fairfield City Council, Hawkesbury City Council, Hills Shire Council, Liverpool City Council, City of Parramatta Council, and the Penrith City Council.

Western Sydney is also sometimes used to refer to the whole Greater Western Sydney region, which is the combination of Western Sydney as defined above and the Macarthur Region (also referred to as South-western Sydney). As well as the ten councils listed above, the GWS region includes Camden Council, Campbelltown City Council and Wollondilly Shire Council.

== Economy ==
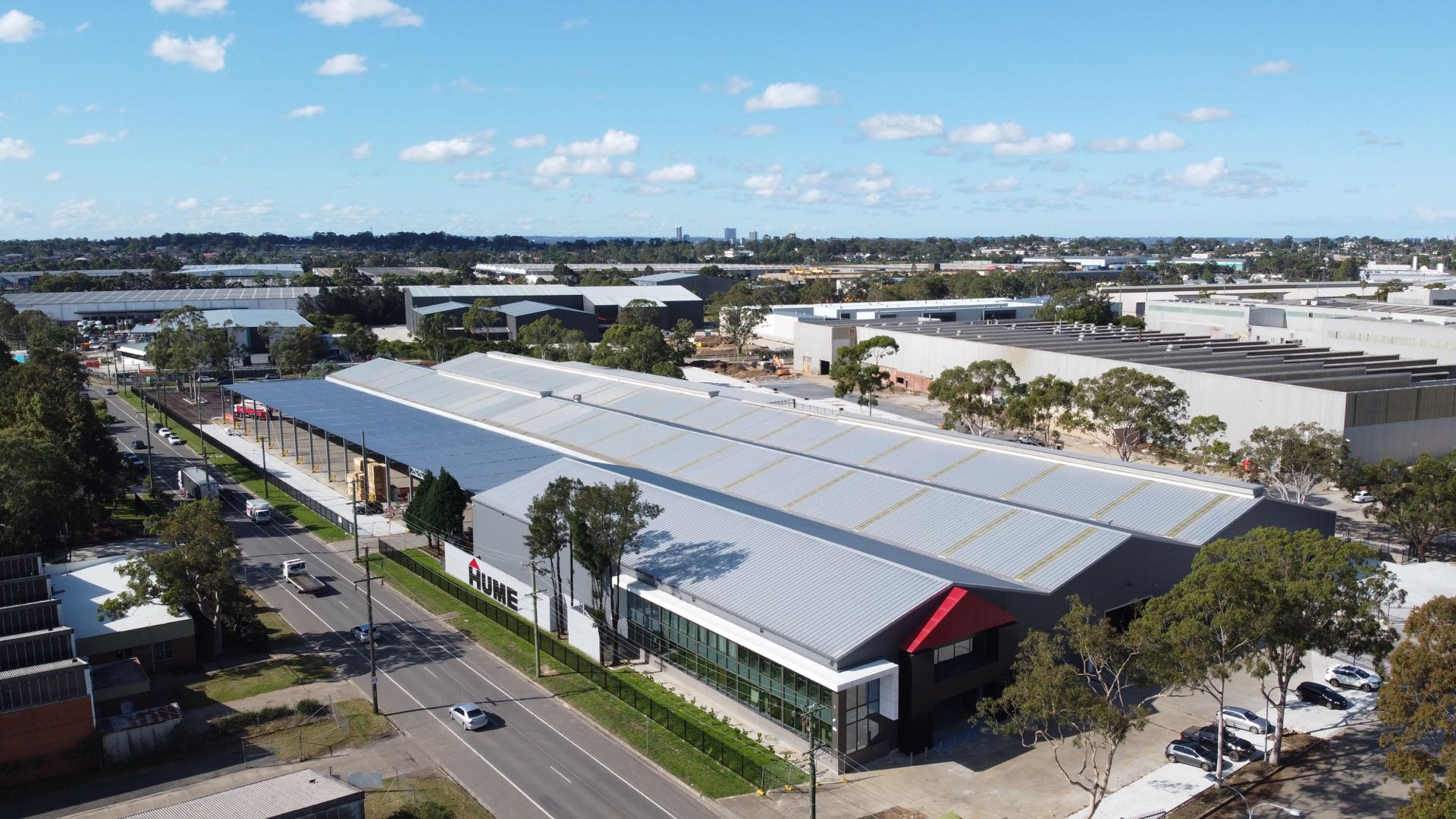
Yennora industrial zone, showing Pine Road and the Hume Building Products warehouses

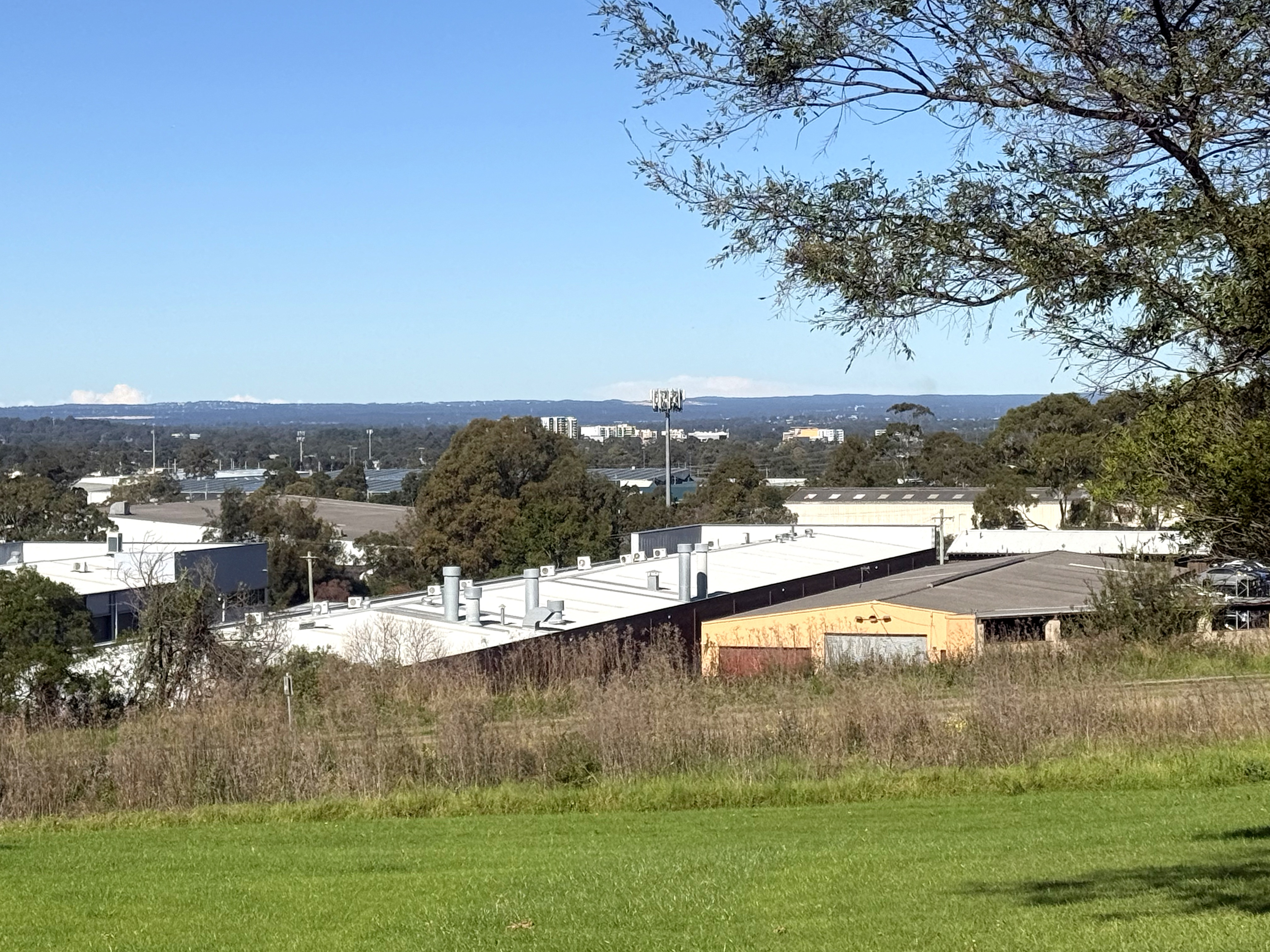
The northern end of Smithfield's industrial zone, viewed from Greystanes.

With more than 240,000 local businesses which generated more than $95 billion gross regional product in 2009, Western Sydney is a diverse area when it comes to socio-economics, with the two largest industries in the region being manufacturing and construction. Of the 544,000 jobs situated in the GWS, 75% of those who live in the region also work there. The Smithfield–Wetherill Park Industrial Estate is the largest industrial estate in the southern hemisphere and is the centre of manufacturing and distribution in GWS. Lying strategically between the major population growth zones in the north-west and south-west of Sydney, it contains more than 1,000 manufacturing, wholesale, transport and service firms which employ more than 20,000 persons.

While overall a lower income area of Sydney, with families who are dependent on childcare as both parents work, higher than average unemployment and lower than average salary levels, Western Sydney has some high income suburbs, nonetheless. Namely, the suburb of The Ponds, in the City of Blacktown, which is the most advantaged suburb in NSW on the SEIFA index of advantage-disadvantage, ahead of suburbs on the North Shore, such as St Ives and Avalon.

Other affluent suburbs in western Sydney, ranging from upper middle class to upper class neighbourhoods, include, Acacia Gardens, Bella Vista, Castle Hill, Cherrybrook, Pemulwuy, Rouse Hill, Schofields, Edmondson Park, Beaumont Hills, Glenmore Park, Cecil Hills, Elizabeth Hills, Middleton Grange, Carnes Hill, Oran Park, Leppington and Spring Farm, among others.

Lower middle class and working class neighbourhoods are mainly concentrated near the heart of the central business district areas of Fairfield, Mount Druitt, Guildford, Cabramatta, Merrylands, Rosehill, Granville, Canley Vale and Auburn. Yennora is known to be the poorest suburb of western Sydney overall, where the median personal income is just $19,000, followed by Landsdowne, Blairmount, Wiley Park, Campsie, Roselands, Carramar, Villawood and Punchbowl. Furthmore, Claymore in the southwest was listed as one of the most socially disadvantaged areas in New South Wales. Nonetheless, the rest of the GWS region is generally made up of a middle class population, with such even found in both affluent and low income suburbs.

=== Livability ===
Due to Parramatta's emergence as "Sydney's second CBD", livability in the surrounding western suburbs has been advancing, with Harris Park being 63rd most liveable area by Domain Group, followed by Parramatta at 110 and Rosehill at 187. Further to the west, Penrith warranted a spot in the top 200 suburbs of the 555 on the list. Seven of the top ten suburbs for home purchasers were more than 20 kilometres (12 mi) west of the Sydney CBD, which included areas with high construction activity such as Baulkham Hills, Castle Hill, Liverpool and Blacktown, which has become Sydney's most popular area for home buyers, with more sales than any other suburb.

This is mainly due to the immense cultural activities and high affordability in the region, and also the development of new restaurants, high-rise apartments, telecommunications, local employment, retail and education. Regarding this, Allworth Homes director Stephen Thompson states, "While the outskirts of Sydney were once considered undesirable, improved infrastructure coupled with soaring house prices has meant many property seekers are looking further afield for their homes, including high-income earners". With Western Sydney Airport opening in the mid 2020s, Penrith is slated to become another CBD, with the airport creating 35,000 jobs by 2035.

=== Agriculture ===
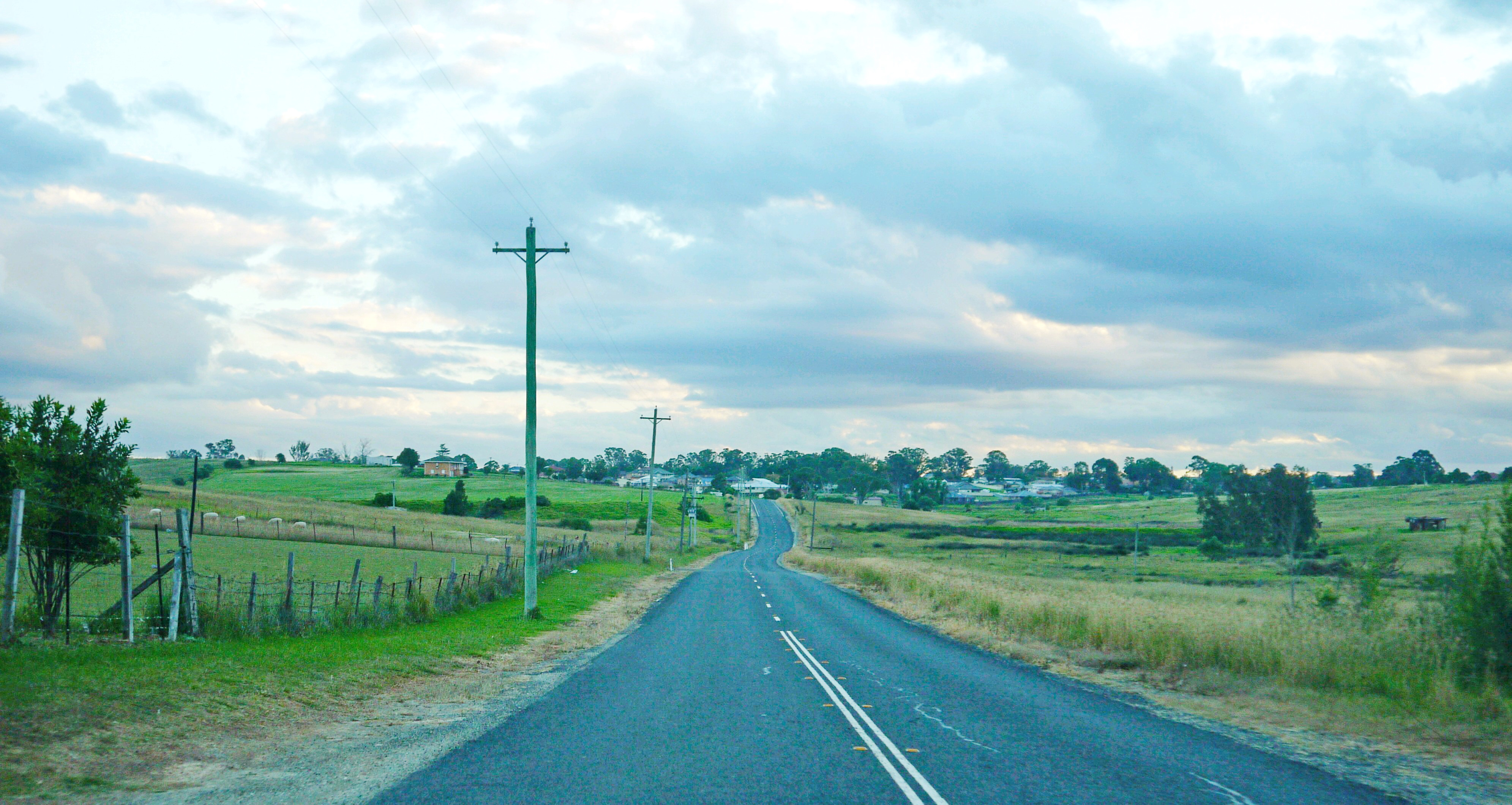
Rural suburb of Luddenham

Agriculture is mainly concentrated in the outskirts of the Greater Western Sydney area, such as in suburbs of Kemps Creek, Mount Vernon, Mulgoa, Bringelly, Silverdale, Orchard Hills, Luddenham and Horsley Park, among others, which lie in a countryside adjacent to the footsteps of the Blue Mountains westwards of these country plains. Abbotsbury, Cecil Hills and Glenmore Park were farms through until the 1980s when it was decided to redevelop them for housing. The area around the site of Regentville has remained largely rural, if hemmed in somewhat by the modern residential suburbs of Jamisontown and Glenmore Park. In the 1870s, the areas that were to become Villawood, Yennora and Carramar became significant vineyard locations due to the relatively rich alluvial soil from nearby creeks.

In the 1800s, John Blaxland built an original wooden weir at "Grove Farm" (now known as Wallacia) for a sandstone flour mill and additional brewery. The land was also used for wheat farming until 1861 when wheat rust infected the entire crop. The rural regions were chiefly one of dairying and grazing during the 19th century, but in the early 20th century – because of its rural atmosphere and proximity to Sydney – tourism developed as people opened their homes as guest houses. Today, the rural areas include a number of orchards and vineyards in the meadows. Vegetable farming and fruit picking are common activities.

=== Waste management ===
Western Sydney's residual waste is disposed of primarily at four landfill facilities: the Lucas Heights Resource Recovery Park, the Woodlawn Eco Precinct in the Goulburn Mulwaree local government area, Elizabeth Drive Landfill in Kemps Creek, and the Eastern Creek landfill in Eastern Creek. The Elizabeth Drive and Eastern Creek landfill facilities primarily receive non-putrescible waste generated by construction and demolition activities, whereas the Lucas Heights Landfill site is Sydney's only remaining putrescible landfill. Food organics and garden organics (FOGO) collected through kerbside services are transported to the Eastern Creek Waste Management Centre on Wallgrove Road for processing, while recyclable materials from yellow-lidded bins are sorted and processed at the Regroup Material Recovery Facility in Strathfield.

== Transport ==
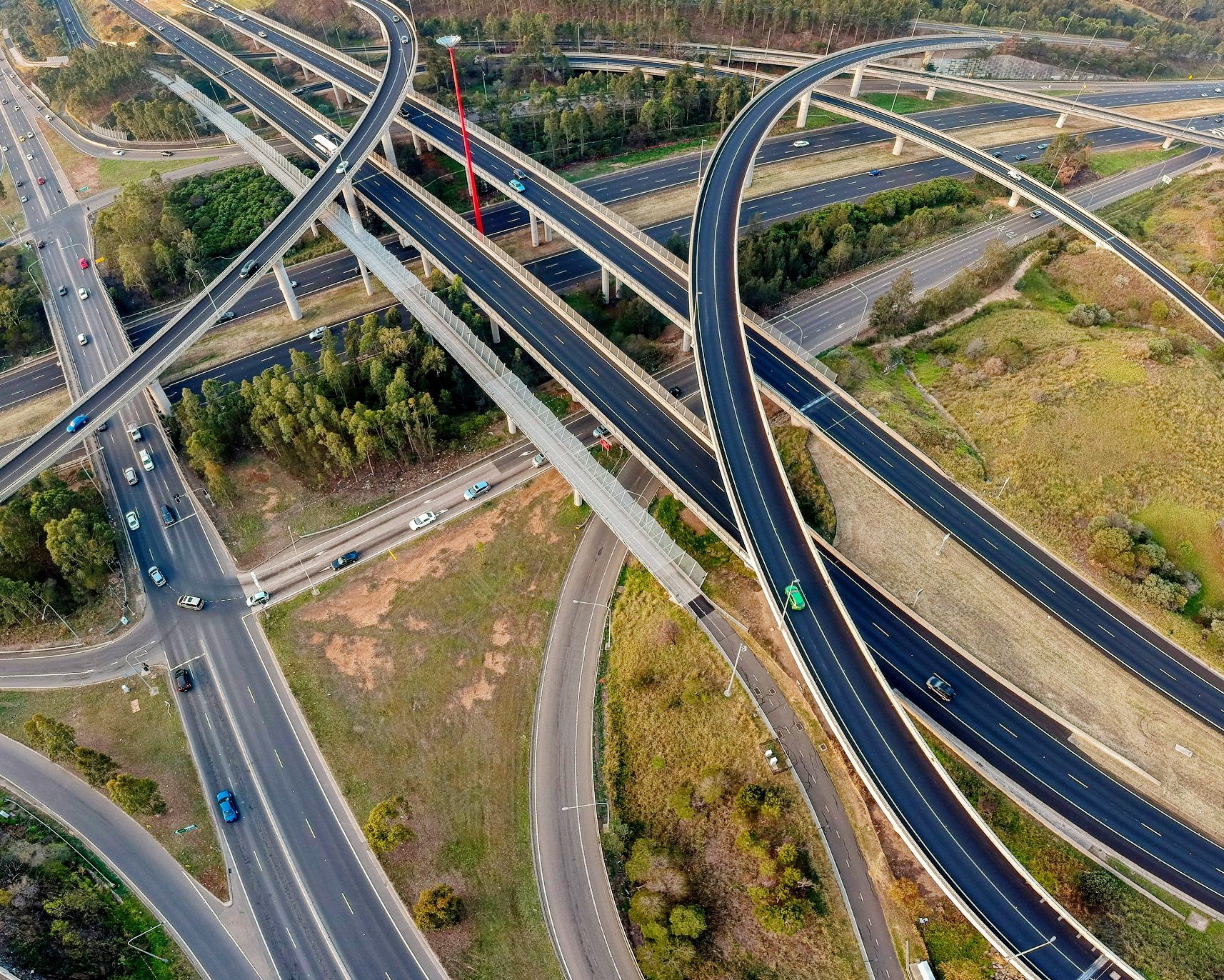
The Light Horse Interchange is the largest in the southern hemisphere.

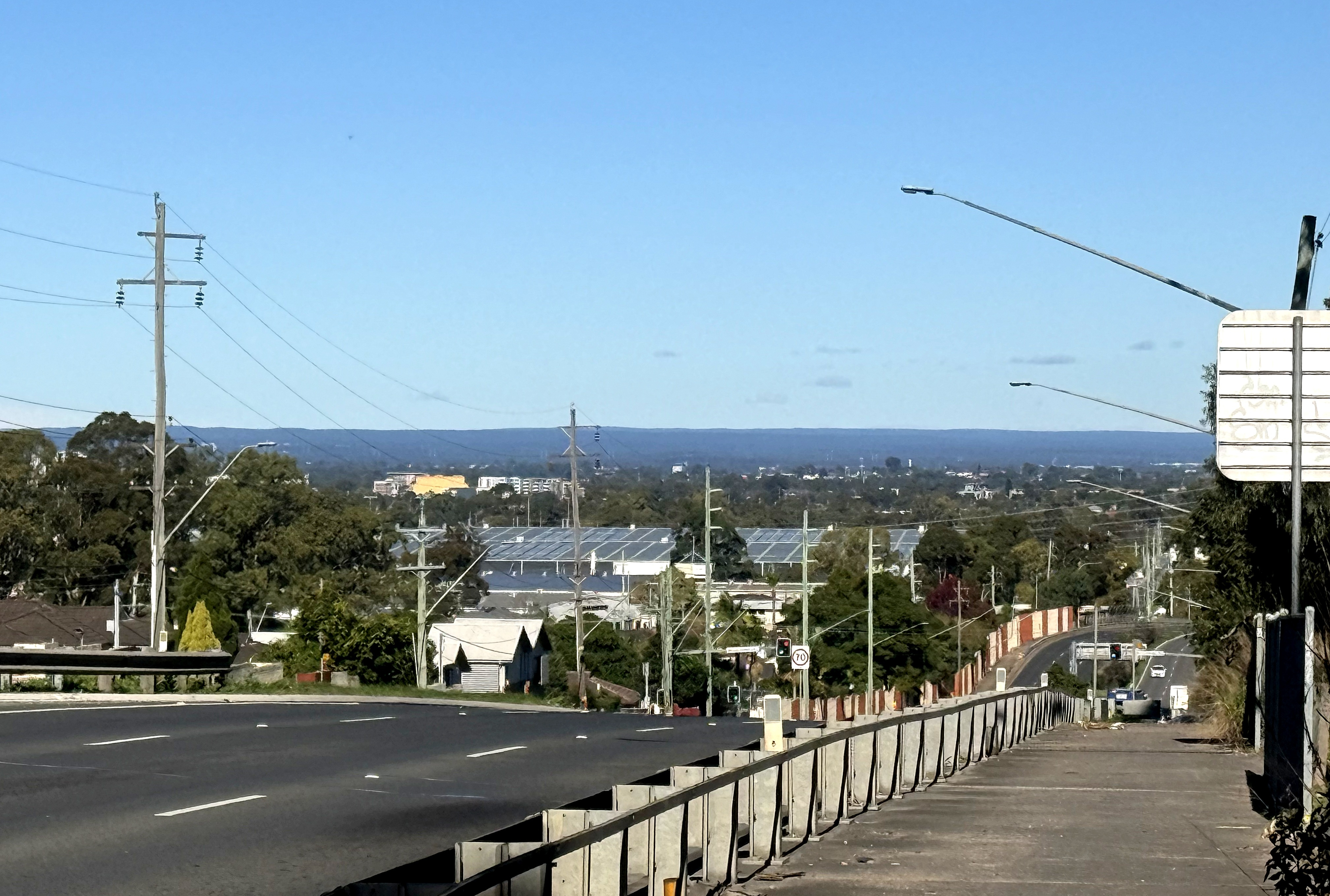
Cumberland Highway at Woodpark

Railway lines in Greater Western Sydney include the Main Western railway line, Main Southern railway line, Bankstown railway line, Richmond railway line, Main Suburban railway line, East Hills railway line and Old Main South railway line, connecting the region to central Sydney. The region is also served by several bus operators. Sydney Metro's Sydney Metro West and Western Sydney Airport Metro projects are currently under construction in the region.

The M4 Western Motorway is a prominent dual carriageway motorway in western Sydney, that stretches from North Strathfield in the east, where it connects with the Great Western Highway/Parramatta Road as the A4 to Glenbrook in west. It continues as the Great Western Highway as the A32, passing the southern fringe of the Parramatta central business district, moving due west across western metropolitan Sydney to Penrith, north of the central business district, crossing the Nepean River via the 1867 Victoria Bridge.

Cumberland Highway links the Pacific Highway (A1/B83) and Pacific Motorway (M1) at Pearces Corner, Wahroonga in the northeast with the Hume Highway (A22/A28) at Liverpool in the southwest.

The M5 Motorway is the primary route from Liverpool to the Sydney CBD, with its terminus being in the south of an interchange near Prestons where the M5 meets the Westlink M7 and the M31 Hume Motorway.

The A6 is a major arterial road that provides a link from the northern and western suburbs to the centre western suburbs – Bankstown and the Princes Highway at Heathcote, via Lidcombe and Bankstown.

Henry Lawson Drive was conceived of as a scenic drive to follow the north bank of the Georges River in Sydney's southwest.

The Light Horse Interchange is a motorway interchange located in Eastern Creek at the junction of the M4 Western Motorway and the Westlink M7 that was opened to traffic in December 2005 due to the population boom in Sydney's western suburbs.

== Politics ==
Greater Western Sydney local government authorities agree on the broad definition of greater western Sydney, but divide the region based on the Regional Organisations of Councils. The Western Sydney Regional Organisation of Councils (WSROC) includes the local government areas of Blacktown, Fairfield, Hawkesbury, Cumberland, Liverpool, Parramatta and Penrith. The Macarthur Regional Organisation of Councils (MACROC) includes the local government areas of Camden, Campbelltown and Wollondilly.

Western Sydney is home to a large number of marginal electorates at both a state and federal level. Western Sydney includes, or partially includes, the NSW Electoral Districts of Penrith, Londonderry, Badgerys Creek, Camden, Macquarie Fields, Leppington, Campbelltown, Liverpool, Cabramatta, Fairfield, Prospect, Bankstown, Granville, Parramatta, Winston Hills, Kellyville, Castle Hill, Riverstone, Mount Druitt, Blacktown, Holsworthy, Auburn, Hawkesbury.

Western Sydney is considered a particularly crucial region in federal politics, and the region's social conservativism from its Christian and Muslim communities has been credited with forming policy on migration and the treatment of asylum seekers by both major political parties. Western Sydney voted 'no' in high margins in the Australian Marriage Law Postal Survey held in 2017. 12 of the 17 divisions that voted 'no' nationally were from Western Sydney. Despite this, Western Sydney is largely dominated by Labor, while the conservative Christian Democrats draw much of their support from the large and devout Arab Christian and Assyrian populations. Western Sydney can therefore be described as an economically left-wing but very socially conservative region, at least compared to the other regions of Sydney.

== Media ==
The city is also served by several local radio stations, including those from Sydney.

FM stations, Community:

- SWR Triple 9 (Blacktown) – 99.9 kHz
- Vintage FM (Penrith) – 87.6 kHz
- 2GLF (Liverpool, Fairfield) – 89.3 kHz
- 2BACR (Bankstown) – 100.9 MHz
- Alive 90.5 (Parramatta, Hills, Holroyd) – 90.5 MHz
- 2MCR (Macarthur)

FM stations, Commercial:

- WSFM 101.7 – 101.7 MHz
- Edge 96.1 – 96.1 MHz
- C91.3 (Campbelltown) – 91.3 MHz

Television:

Greater Western Sydney is also served by five Sydney television networks, three commercial and two national services:

- Nine Network
- Network 10
- Seven Network
- ABC TV
- SBS

== Sport ==
The region hosts many professional sporting teams in a wide range of codes. The National Rugby League has four teams based in the region; the Canterbury-Bankstown Bulldogs, Parramatta Eels, Penrith Panthers and Wests Tigers. The South Sydney Rabbitohs also play their home games in the region. The Sydney Thunder play at the Big Bash League (cricket). The A-League's Western Sydney Wanderers association football club is also based in this region of Sydney. The region also hosts Macarthur FC of the A-League. Greater Sydney Rams in Rugby union, now represent the region in the National Rugby Championship. The region acts as the namesake of the Australian Football League's Greater Western Sydney Giants Australian rules football club.

Other sporting teams include:

- Baseball: Sydney Blue Sox
- Ice hockey: Western Sydney Ice Dogs
- Netball: Greater Western Sydney Giants

The Sydney Olympic Park was built for the 2000 Olympic Games, and has hosted the NRL Grand Final, the Sydney 500 auto race and the Sydney International tennis tournament.

Previously the region was represented in Australia's professional Basketball league the NBL, by the West Sydney Razorbacks. While the Razorbacks folded, the Sydney Kings who typically played at the Sydney Entertainment Centre, an eastern Sydney venue, have since moved to the Sydney SuperDome at Sydney Olympic Park and market towards the whole metropolitan area of Sydney.

== Education ==
Major education facilities include:

- Western Sydney University, a multi-campus university that is ranked in the top 300 in the world in the 2021 THE World University Rankings and 18th in Australia in 2021.
- TAFE NSW campuses across Western Sydney (including OTEN) and South Western Sydney
- University of Sydney – Camden and Westmead Campus
- Australian College of Physical Education

It contains many primary and secondary schools.

== Landmarks ==
West

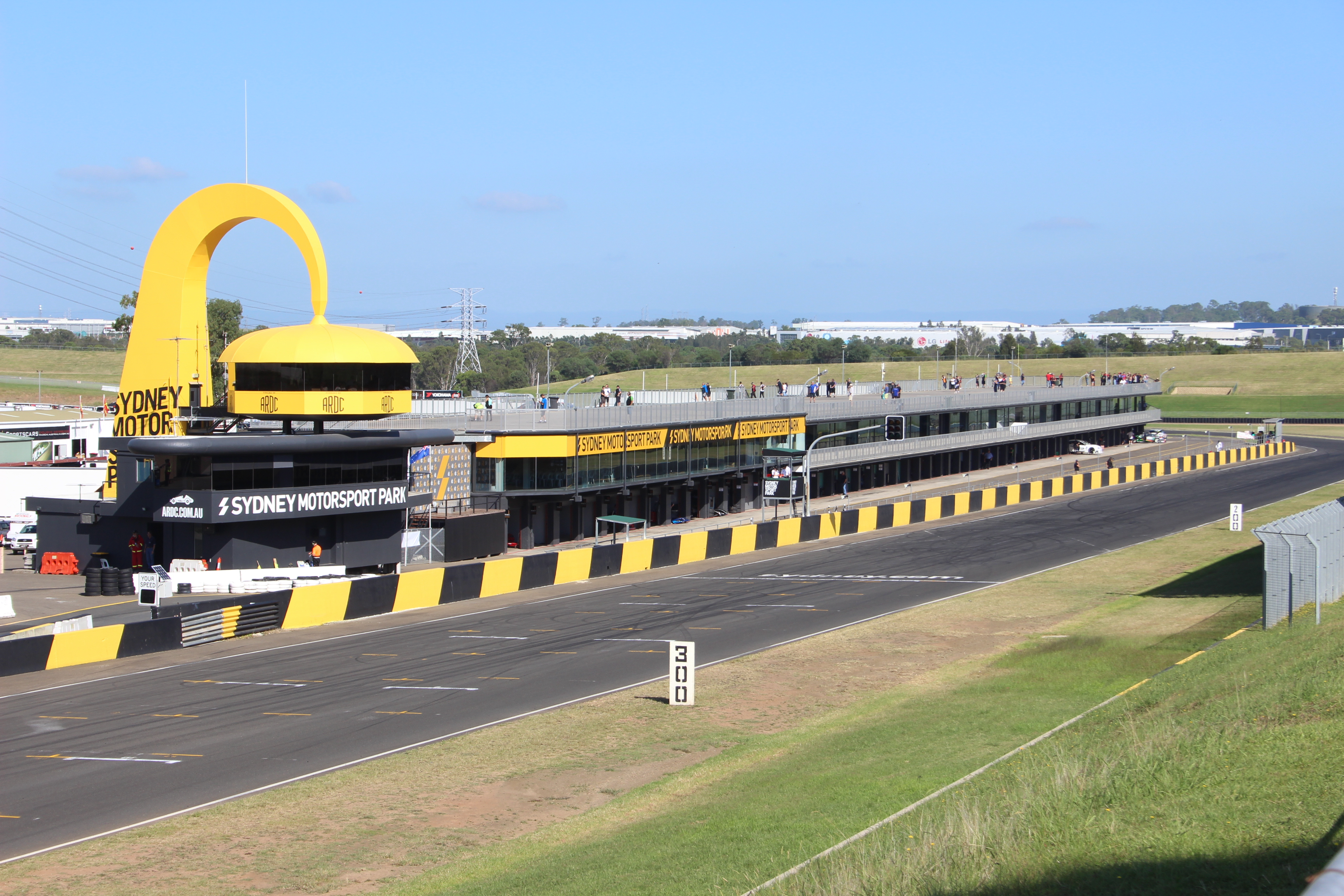
Sydney Motorsport Park

- Raging Waters Sydney in Prospect, in the City of Blacktown, a water park operated by Palace Entertainment.
- Auburn Botanic Gardens, a botanical garden situated in Auburn.
- Central Gardens Nature Reserve in Merrylands West.
- Sydney Olympic Park, a suburb created to host the 2000 Summer Olympics
- Sydney Motorsport Park, a motorsport circuit located in Eastern Creek.
- Boothtown Aqueduct in Greystanes, a 19th-century water bridge that is listed on the New South Wales State Heritage Register as a site of State significance
- The Blue Mountains, which is situated on the outskirts of greater western Sydney.
- Western Sydney Parklands, a major urban parkland which features many attractions such as picnic areas and lookouts, Calmsley Hill City Farm, Blacktown Olympic Park, Eastern Creek Raceway, the more recently opened zoo, Sydney Zoo, and most notably, the Nurragingy Reserve.
- Western Sydney Regional Park, a major precinct in the above parkland, located in Abbotsbury
- Fairfield Showground, a multi-purpose indoor-outdoor venue situated in Prairiewood.
- Bents Basin, a protected nature reserve, a state park and a swimming hole near Wallacia
- Prospect Nature Reserve, a large recreational area that features a potable water supply and storage reservoir.
- Lower Prospect Canal Reserve, a heritage-listed former farm and public water supply canal and now bushy corridor and nature reserve stretching 7.7 kilometres (4.8 mi).
- Linnwood, Guildford, a heritage-listed former residence, school, local history museum and children's home and now historical society located in Guildford.
- Auburn Gallipoli Mosque, an Ottoman-style mosque in Auburn.

Northwest

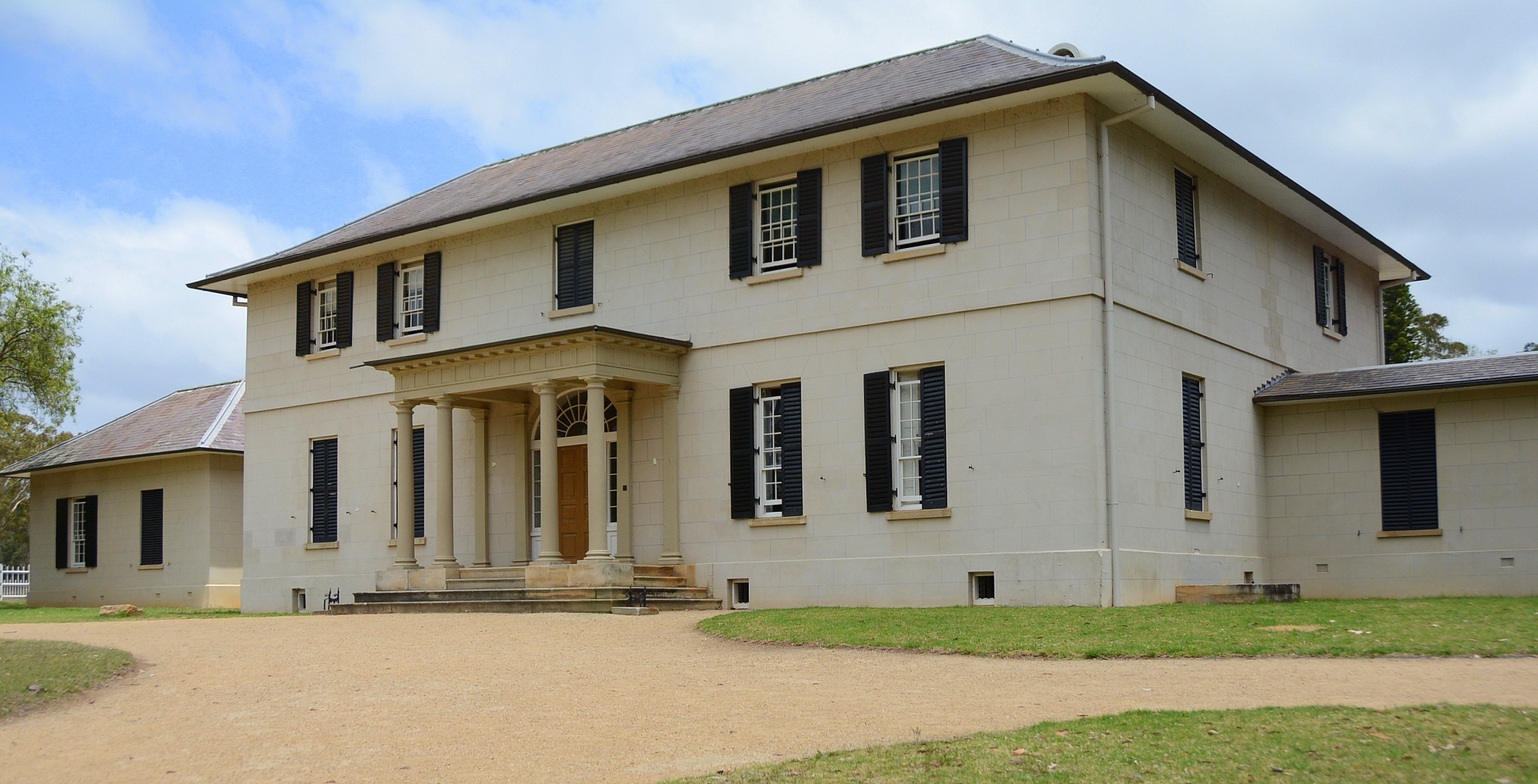
Old Government House in Parramatta is a World Heritage Site.

- Featherdale Wildlife Park, an Australian zoo in Doonside, near Blacktown.
- Westfield Parramatta, Parramatta.
- Old Government House, a historic house museum and tourist spot in Parramatta, was included in the Australian National Heritage List. Moreover, the house is Australia's oldest surviving public building.
- Prospect Hill, a historically significant ridge in the west, listed on the NSW State Heritage Register.
- Lake Parramatta, a man-made reservoir, a swimming spot and a recreational area located in North Parramatta.
- Balaka Falls, a natural waterfall in Carlingford
- Neoblie, a heritage-listed former residence at Great Western Highway in Mount Druitt.
- The Manse, a heritage-listed former residence and now community museum also in Mount Druitt.
- Hunting Lodge, Rouse Hill, a heritage-listed colonial era hunting lodge located at The Water Lane.
- Royal Oak Inn, Rouse Hill, a heritage-listed hotel located on Windsor Road.
- Elizabeth Farm, an historic estate located in Rosehill.
- Comfort Lodge, heritage-listed former residence and boarding house in Rosehill.
- Elizabeth Farm Reserve, a heritage-listed public reserve on former farmland also in Rosehill.
- Rosehill Gardens Racecourse
- Granville Town Hall
- Crest Theatre
- Camden
- Goldfinders Inn, a heritage-listed former inn, guesthouse, general store and post office and now residence at Kurrajong.

Southwest

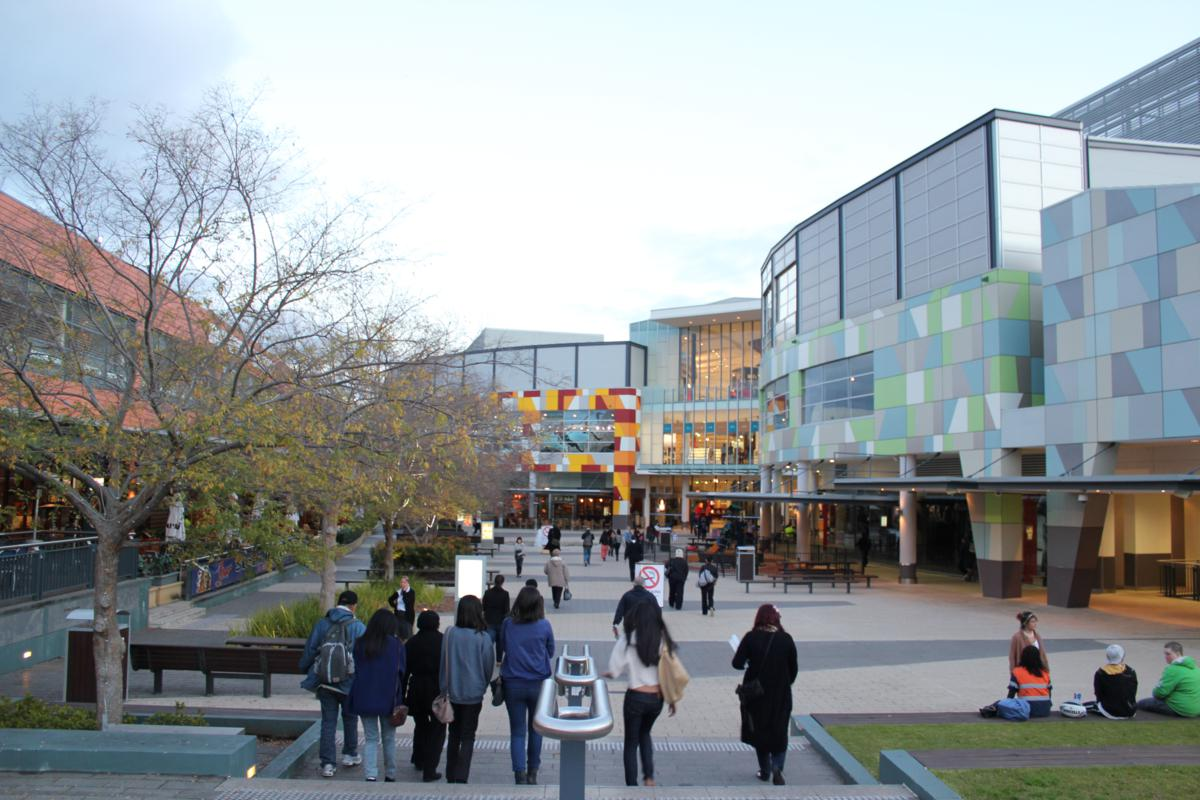
Macarthur Square, Campbelltown, one of the largest shopping complexes in Sydney

- Cecil Hills Farm, a heritage-listed residence in Cecil Hills.
- Chipping Norton Lake, an important recreational area for Liverpool City council and Fairfield City Council.
- Georges River National Park
- Macarthur Square, a shopping complex in Campbelltown.
- The Bland Oak in Carramar, one of the oldest and largest trees in Sydney.
- Lansdowne Bridge, a heritage-listed road bridge that carries the Hume Highway across the Prospect Creek at Lansvale.
- Oran Park (homestead), a heritage-listed former golf course, private residence and golf clubhouse and now private residence in Oran Park.
- Raby, Catherine Field, a heritage-listed former sheep farm and cattle farm and now private residence located in Catherine Field.
- Horningsea Park, a heritage-listed homestead in Horningsea Park
- William Inglis Hotel, a luxury hotel situated in Warwick Farm.

== Gallery ==
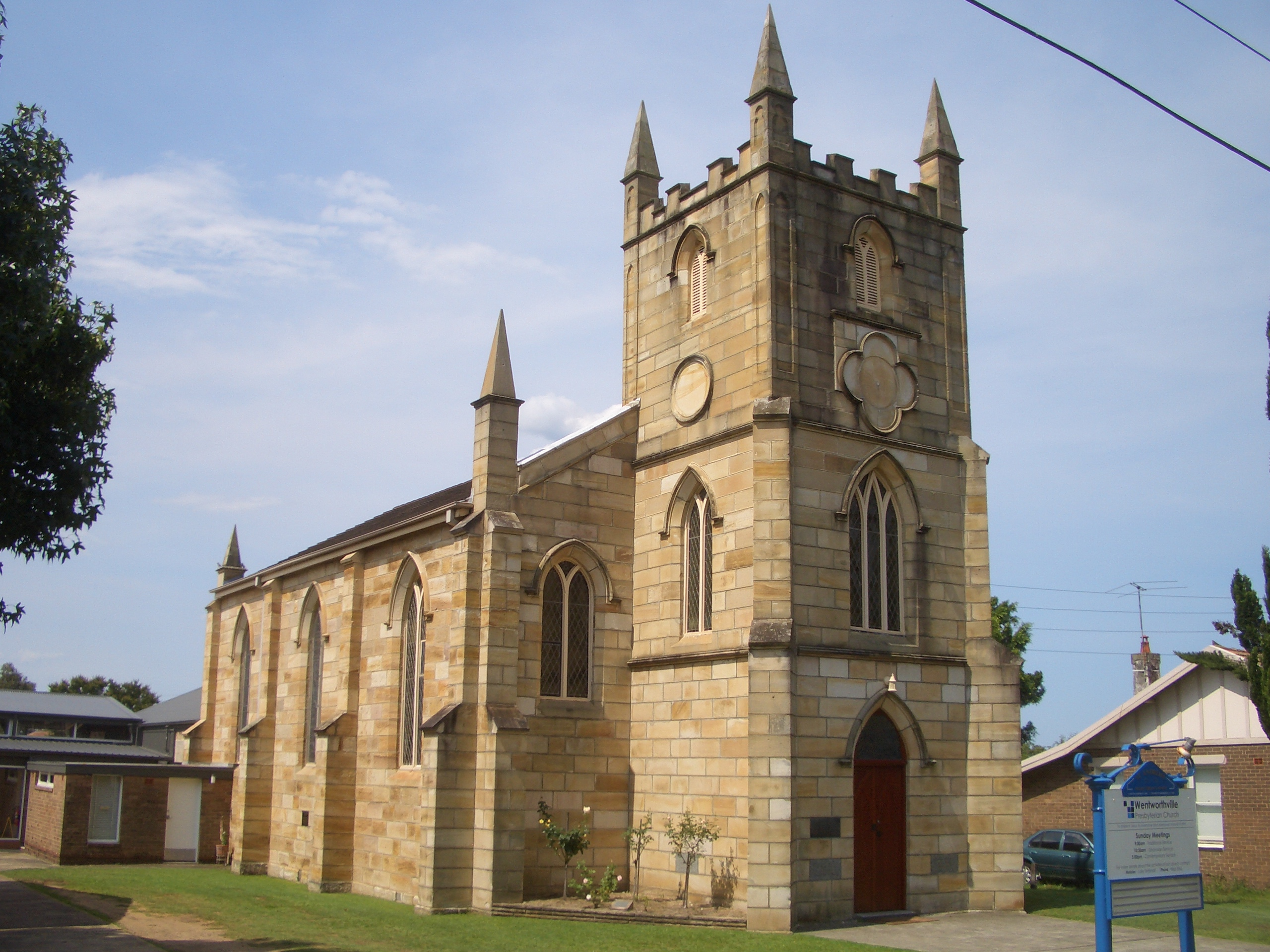
Presbyterian Church Wentworthville

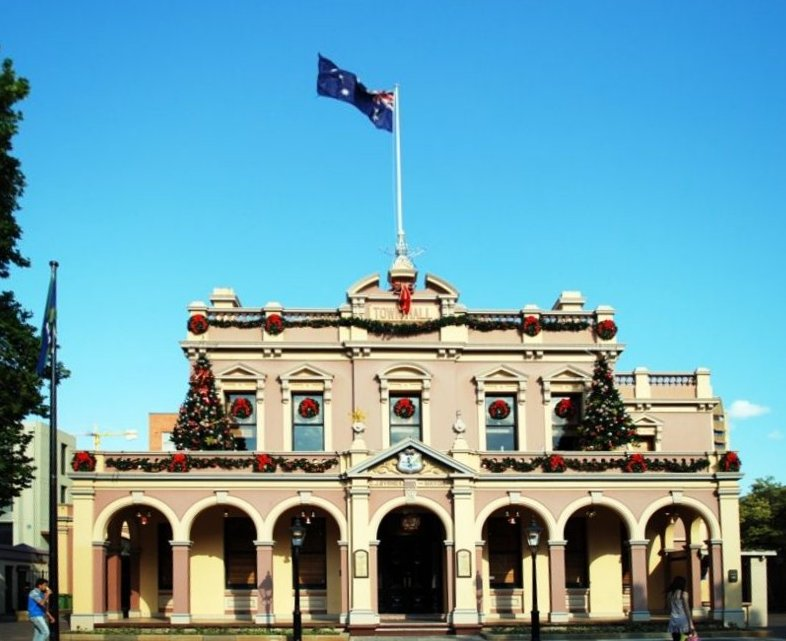
Parramatta Town Hall

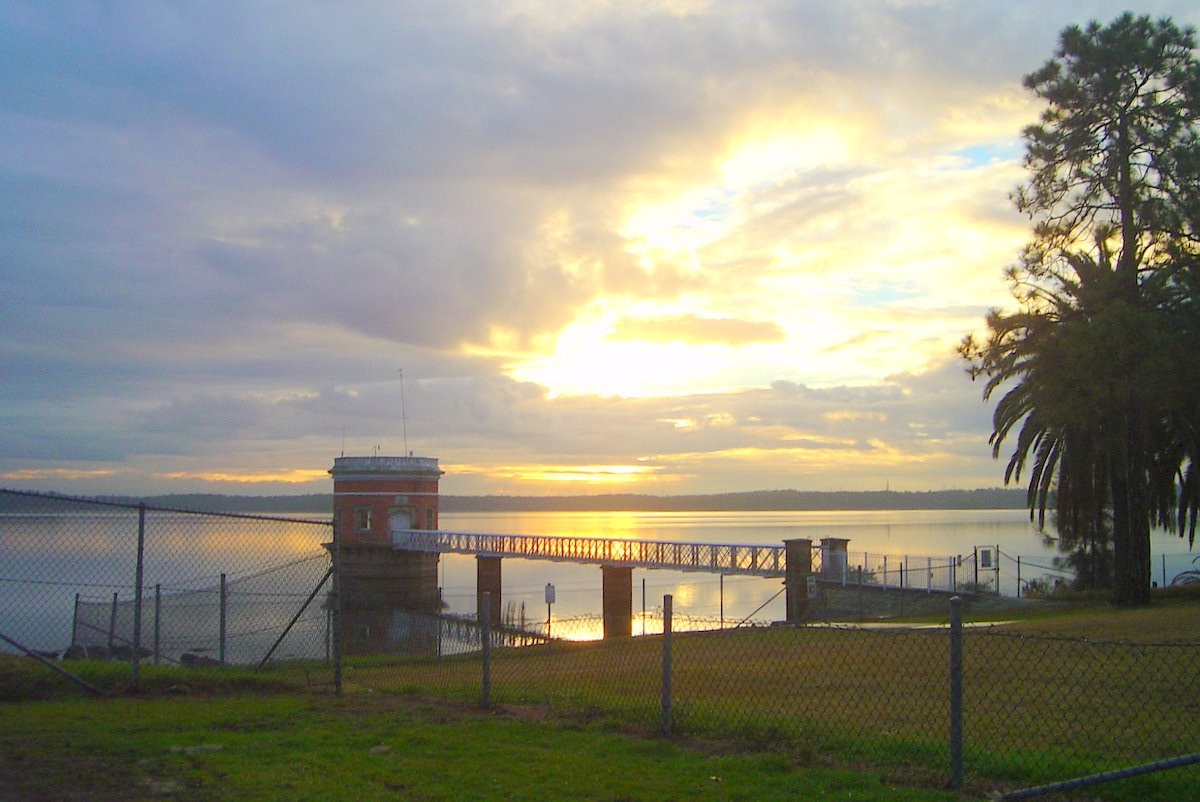
Prospect Reservoir

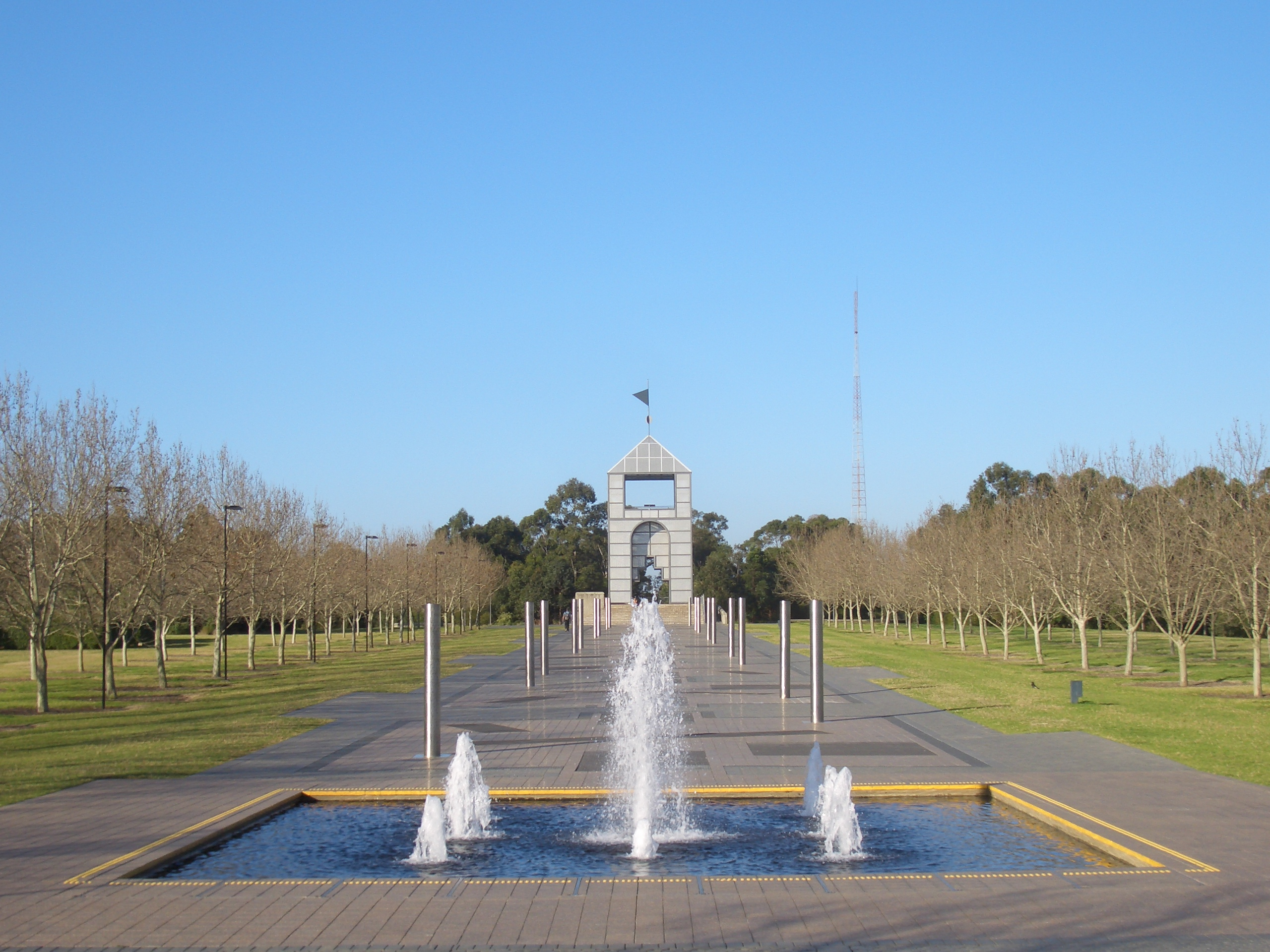
Bicentennial Park at Sydney Olympic Park

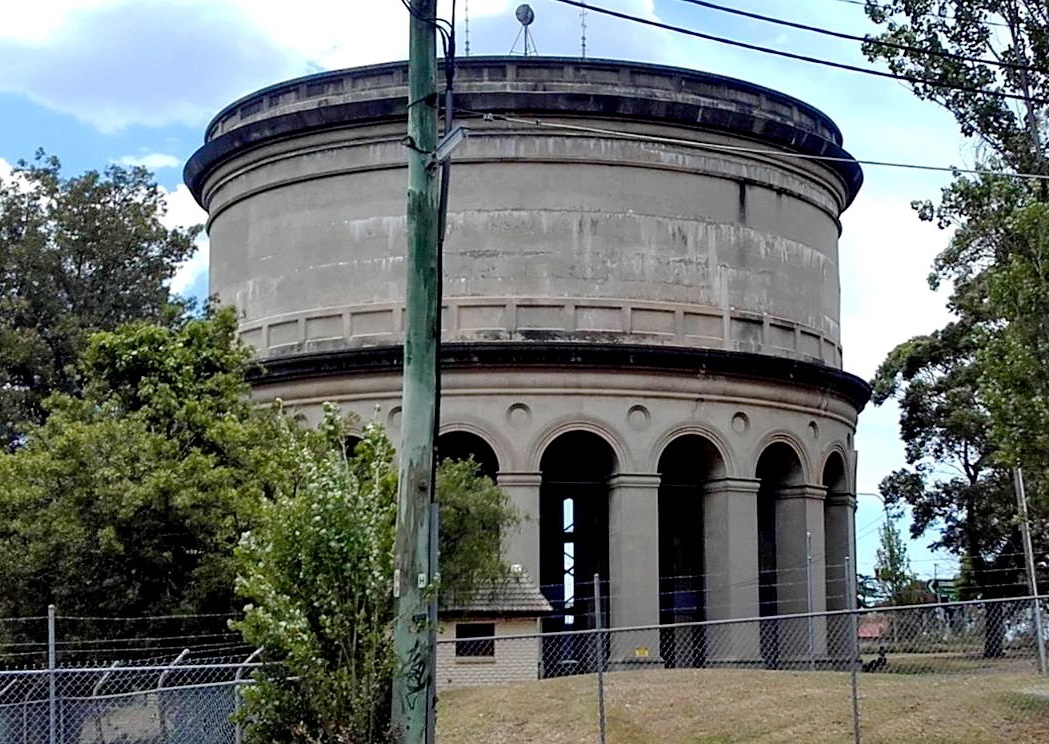
Bankstown Reservoir

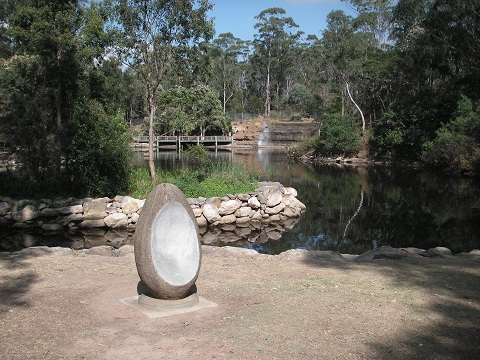
Central Gardens Nature Reserve

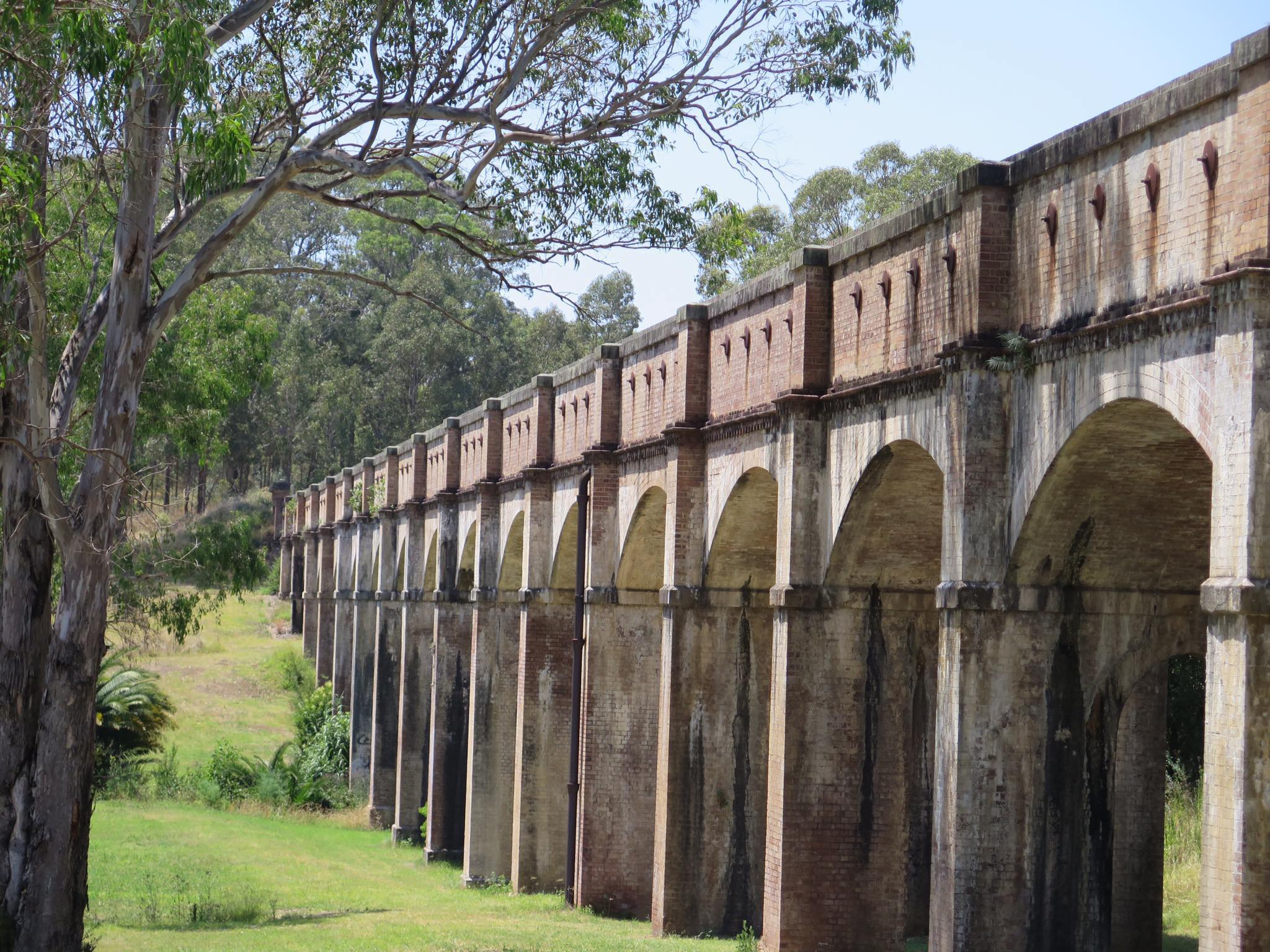
Boothtown Aqueduct

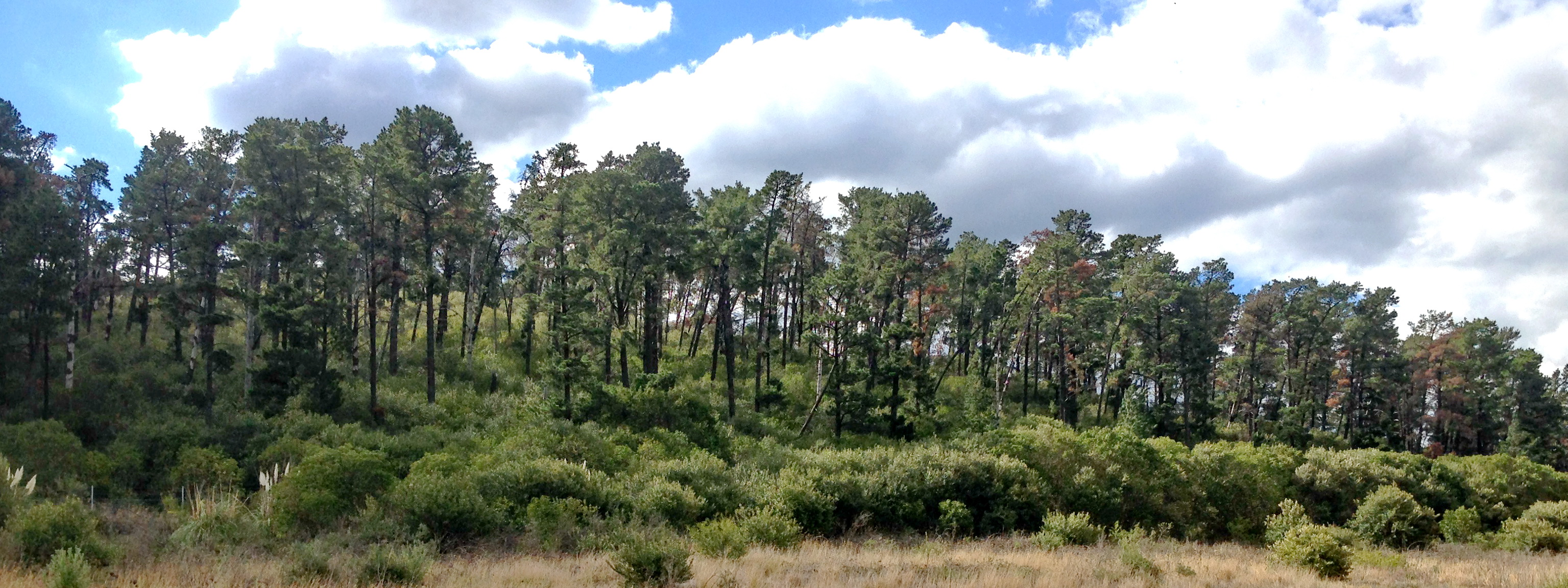
Prospect Hill Laccolith (Monterey pine forest)

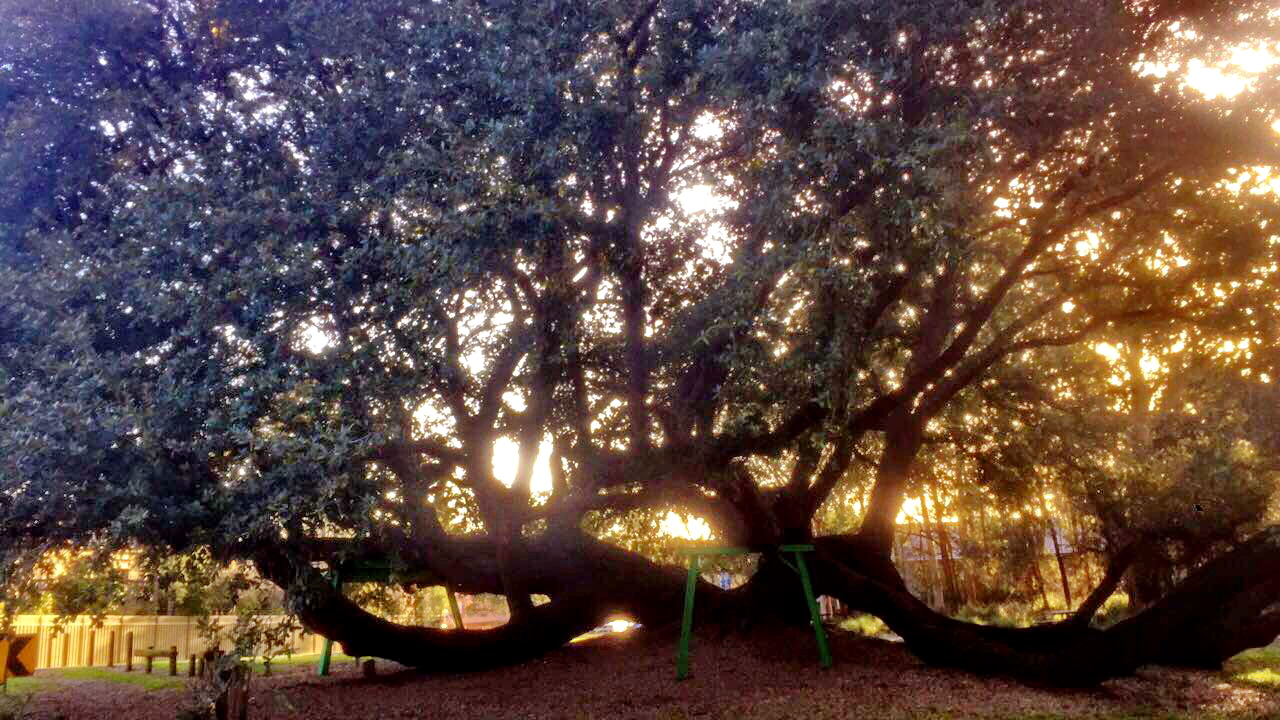
The Bland Oak tree

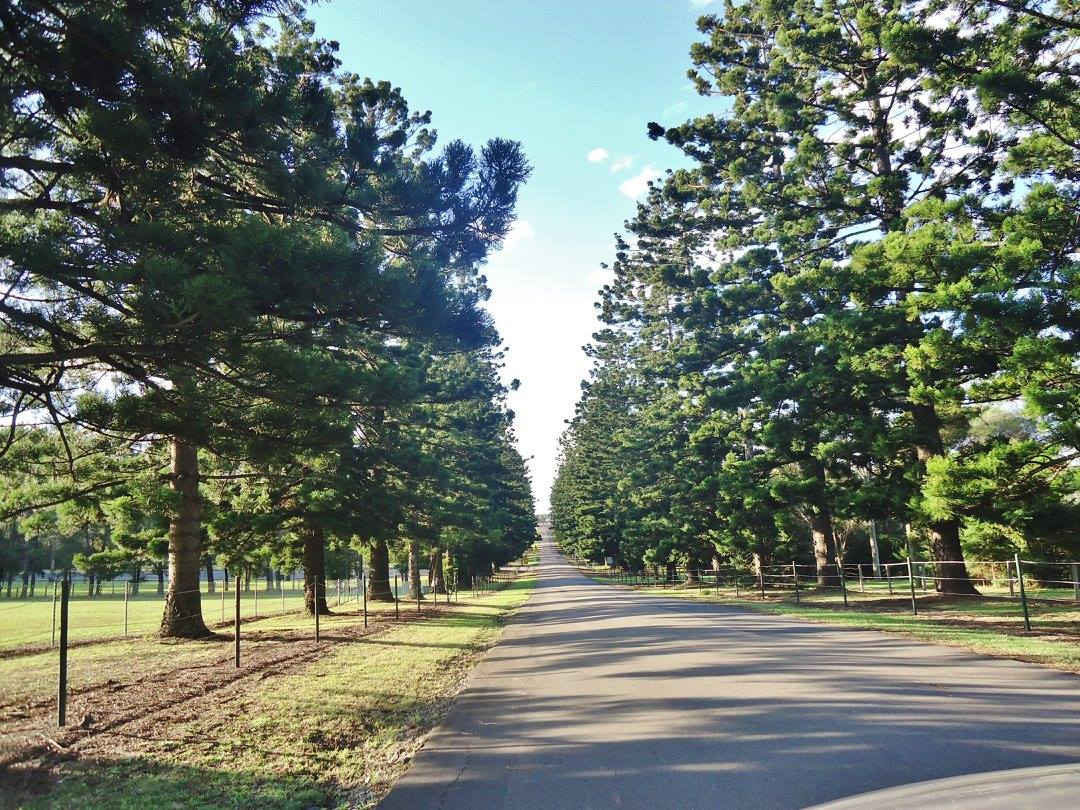
Entrance to Prospect Reservoir recreational area

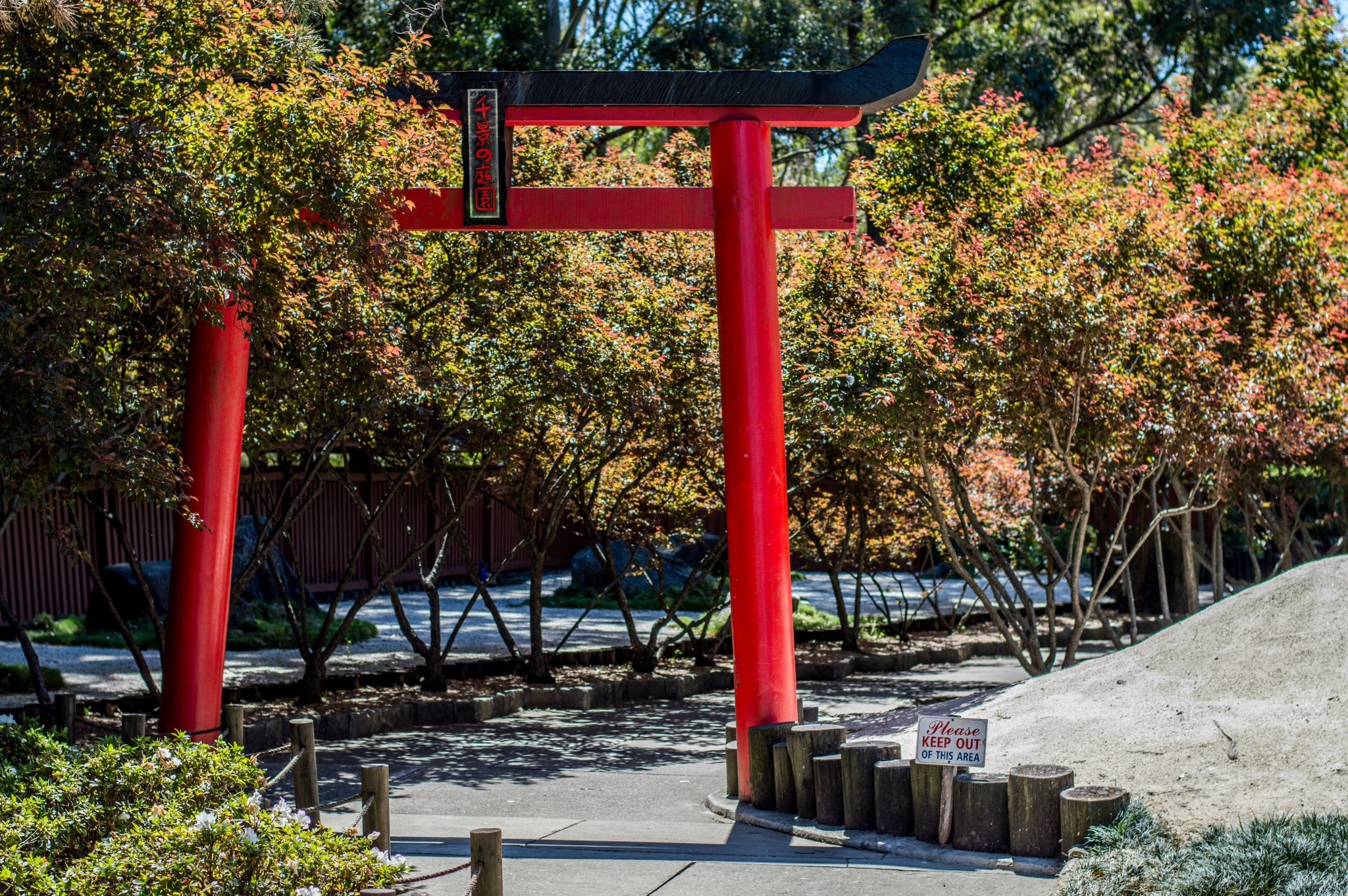
Auburn Botanic Gardens

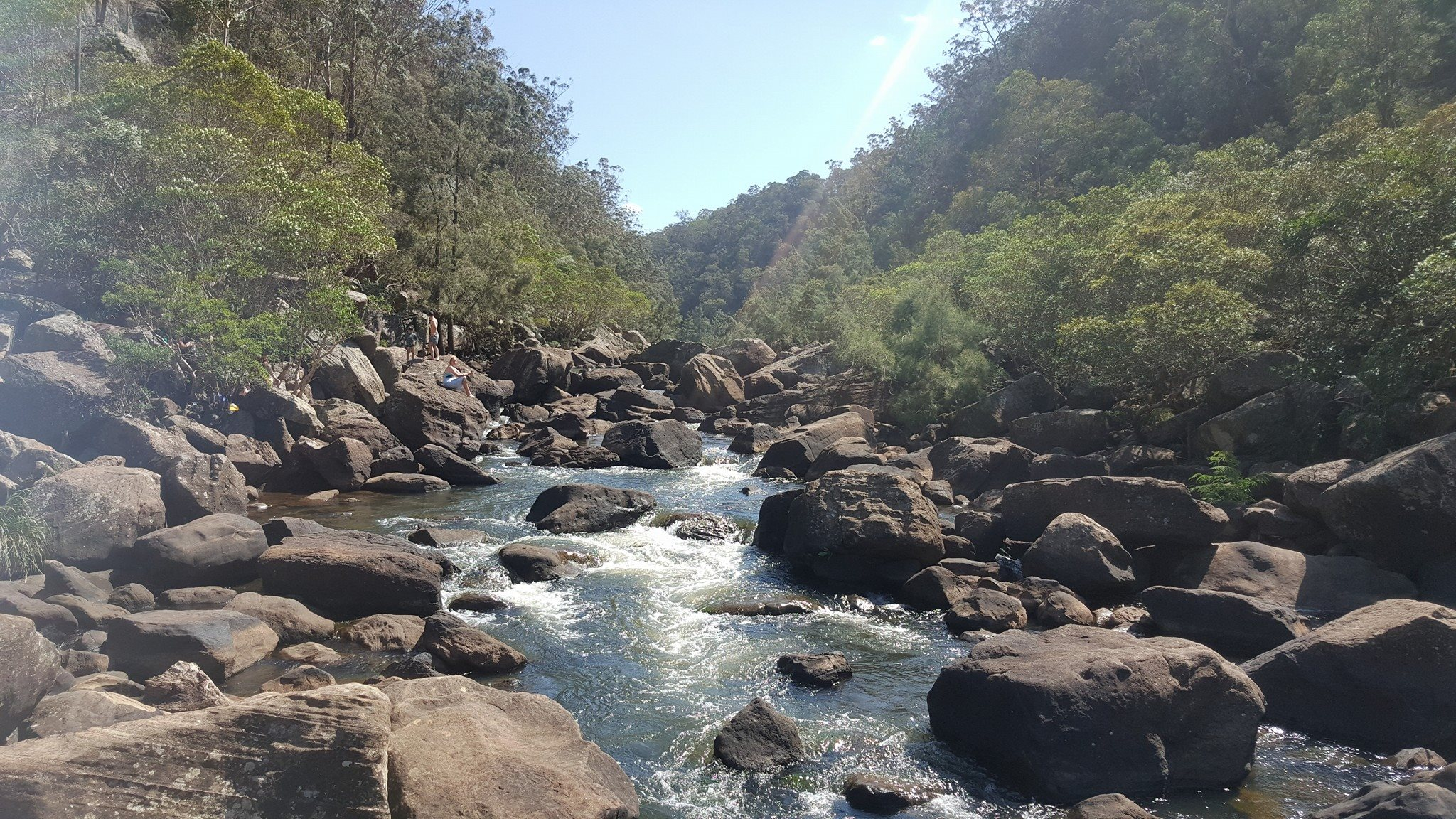
Rocky rapids of Bents Basin

== See also ==
- Cumberland Plain
- Darug people
- Westie
- Regions of New South Wales
  - Regions of Sydney
- Western Sydney Regional Organisation of Councils
- Local government areas of New South Wales
- Geography of Sydney
