= Pennant Hills Road =

Highway in Sydney, New South Wales, Australia

Pennant Hills Road Cumberland Highway New South Wales
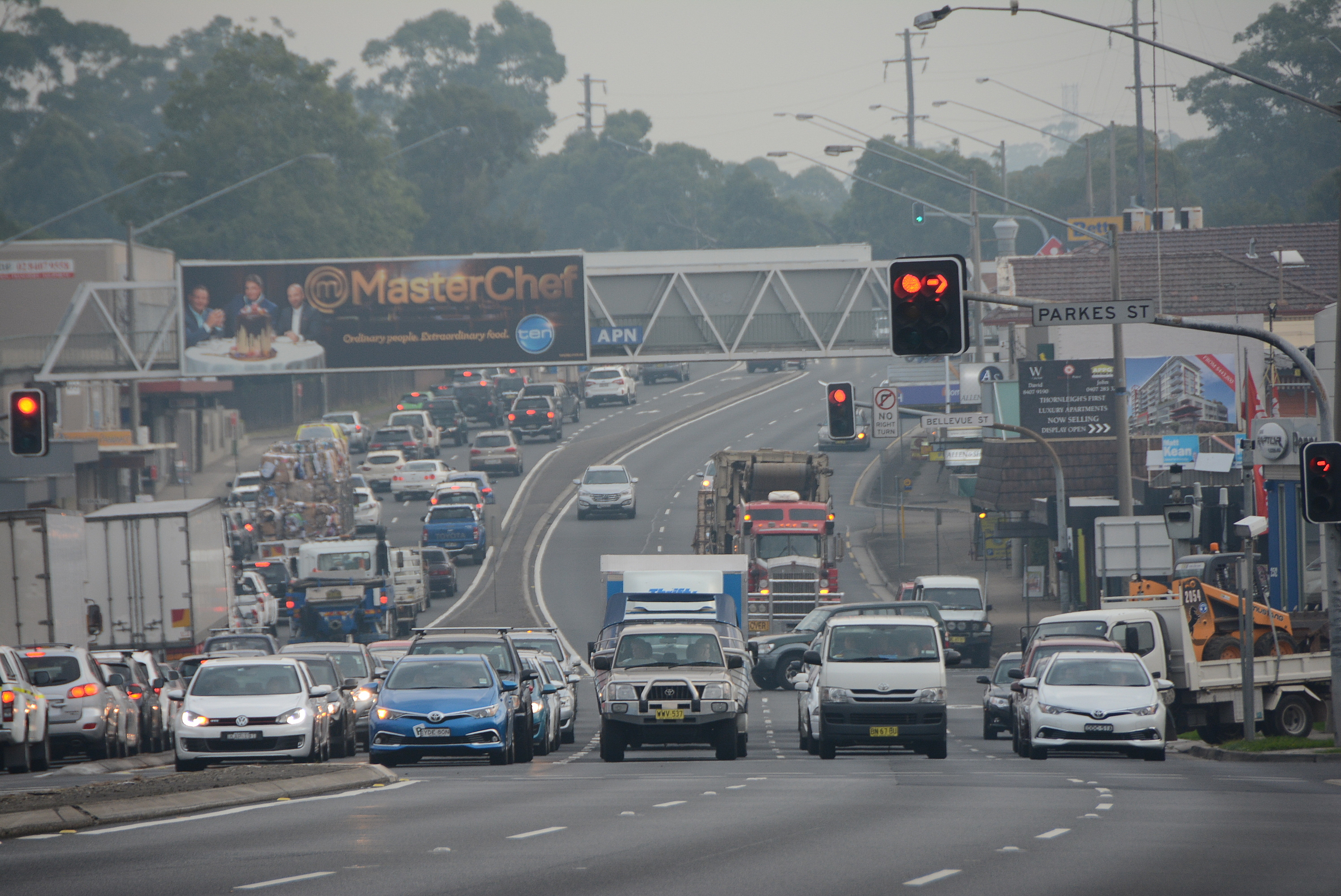
- Pennant Hills Road at Thornleigh in 2016
- Coordinates: 33.718293°S 151.108269°E (Northeast end); 33.803499°S 151.005768°E (Southwest end)

General information
- Type: Highway
- Length: 16.1 km (10 mi)
- Gazetted: August 1928 (as Main Road 13); August 1988 (as State Highway 13, Cumberland Highway)
- Route number(s): A28 (2013–present) (Wahroonga–North Parramatta)
- Former route number: Metroad 7 (1993–2013) (Wahroonga–West Pennant Hills); Metroad 2 (1993–1997)); State Route 30 (1974–1993) (Pennant Hills–West Pennant Hills); Metroad 6 (2005–2013) (West Pennant Hills–Carlingford); Metroad 7 (1993–2005) (West Pennant Hills–North Parramatta); State Route 77 (1988–1993) (Wahroonga–North Parramatta); State Route 55 (1974–1988); Ring Road 5 (1964–1974) Entire route

Major junctions
- Northeast end: Pacific Highway; Wahroonga, Sydney
- Pacific Motorway; NorthConnex; Beecroft Road; Castle Hill Road; M2 Hills Motorway; Carlingford Road; Marsden Road; James Ruse Drive
- Southwest end: Church Street; Parramatta, Sydney

Location(s)
- Major suburbs: Normanhurst, Thornleigh, Pennant Hills, Carlingford

Highway system
- Highways in Australia; National Highway • Freeways in Australia; Highways in New South Wales

Pennant Hills Road is a 16.1-kilometre-long (10.0 mi) arterial road located in Sydney, New South Wales, Australia. The road links the suburb of Wahroonga in the northeast, to the major central business district of Parramatta in the southwest. Apart from a small section at its southwestern end, it is a constituent part of Cumberland Highway, and is designated part of route A28.

In 2015 NRMA members voted the Pennant Hills Road as the second worst road in New South Wales and the Australian Capital Territory, with approximately 5,000 heavy vehicle movements per day. NorthConnex, a 9-kilometre (5.6 mi) motorway tunnel opened on 31 October 2020, runs parallel to Pennant Hills Road and links M2 Hills Motorway at West Pennant Hills with Pacific Highway and Pacific Motorway at Wahroonga. NorthConnex aims to reduce congestion and improve traffic flow along part of the Pennant Hills Road, reducing air and traffic pollution.

== Route ==
Pennant Hills Road commences at Pearce's Corner, the intersection with Pacific Highway in Wahroonga, and heads in a southwesterly direction as a dual-carriageway, four-lane road, crossing an intersection with exits leading to the southern end of Pacific Motorway (M1) and the northern end of NorthConnex nearly immediately and widening to a six-lane road, then passes through the Hornsby Shire suburbs of Normanhurst, Thornleigh and Pennant Hills. In Thornleigh there is a major intersection with The Comenarra Parkway, an arterial road which begins as Yanko Road in West Pymble. In the evening this intersection can get quite busy, and is often characterised by bumper to bumper traffic on the Comenarra Parkway, as motorists attempt to turn either left or right onto Pennant Hills Road. The Parkway has become somewhat of a through route from the North Shore suburbs as well as the city, with some motorists choosing to avoid Epping Road and M2 Hills Motorway and travel west through the Parkway.

At Pennant Hills, the road crosses the Northern railway Line, intersects with Yarrara Road and Boundary Road, heading west, after which is located a major intersection with Beecroft Road. It continues west, then southwest, towards Thompson's Corner, in West Pennant Hills, where there is a major intersection with Castle Hill Road. In the mid-1990s, a tunnel was built beneath the intersection which allows traffic from Castle Hill Road to turn onto Pennant Hills Road, going southbound, without negotiating the traffic lights. This also means that southbound traffic already on Pennant Hills Road rarely has to stop at the Thompson's Corner intersection, only if pedestrians are crossing.

The road continues south to the interchange with M2 Hills Motorway and the southern end of NorthConnex, narrowing back to a four-lane road and continuing south through Carlingford and the intersection with North Rocks Road and to the intersection with Carlingford Road. South of the Carlingford Road intersection lies the intersection with Marsden Road, and the road then continues southwest towards Parramatta, crossing the former Carlingford railway line, through Telopea to the major interchange with James Ruse Drive in North Parramatta; Cumberland Highway heads north along James Ruse Drive, whereas Pennant Hills Road continues southwest into Parramatta where it eventually terminates at the intersection with Church Street.

The road has a 60 km/h (37 mph) speed limit from Pearce's Corner for the short distance to the M1 intersection. From the M1 intersection it is 70 km/h (43 mph) for the entire distance to the M2 Motorway interchange. From here, the road reverts to a 60 km/h (37 mph) limit to Parramatta, with numerous 40 km/h (25 mph) "school zones" (8:00am–9:30am and 2:30pm–4:00pm), and two fixed speed cameras, between Evans Road and Coleman Avenue in Carlingford and between Castle Street and Bellevue Street in North Parramatta. Both are 60 km/h (37 mph) zones.

Pennant Hills Road frontage is a mix of businesses, schools and homes. The biggest concentration of businesses are at Thornleigh, Pennant Hills, West Pennant Hills (Thompson's Corner) and Carlingford, with the Carlingford area being the biggest.

== History ==
Pennant Hills Road began its life in 1820 as a bullock track used by timbermen. It was surveyed by government surveyor James Meehan in order to provide a route from Ermington Wharf to the Pennant Hills sawmill established by Governor Lachlan Macquarie in 1816. The line of the original track, from Thompsons Corner to Ermington Wharf, is followed by Pennant Hills Road, Marsden Road, and Wharf Road Ermington. Subsequently, it joined the Lane Cove Road (now Pacific Highway) further north and was sometimes considered the same road.

The passing of the Main Roads Act of 1924 through the Parliament of New South Wales provided for the declaration of Main Roads, roads partially funded by the State government through the Main Roads Board (MRB). Main Road No. 13 was declared on 8 August 1928, from Pearce's Corner in Wahroonga, along Pennant Hills Road to Parramatta (and continuing south via Church Street and Woodville Road to the intersection with Great Southern Highway (today Hume Highway) at Lansdowne; with the passing of the Main Roads (Amendment) Act of 1929 to provide for additional declarations of State Highways and Trunk Roads, this was amended to State Highway 13 on 8 April 1929.

With the declaration of Pennant Hills Road as a constituent part of Cumberland Highway on 26 August 1988, the western end of State Highway 13 was altered to use the Parramatta Bypass (today James Ruse Drive) around Parramatta and continue along Cumberland Highway to Liverpool; Main Road 637 was declared along the remaining section from James Ruse Drive to Church Street. Despite this, much of the signage today still identifies Pennant Hills Road under its own name.

The passing of the Roads Act of 1993 updated road classifications and the way they could be declared within New South Wales. Under this act, and as part of Cumberland Highway, Pennant Hills Road today retains its declaration as Highway 13, from Wahroonga to Parramatta (and continuing southwest along Cumberland Highway eventually to Liverpool).

State Highway 13 eventually assumed the role of a western bypass of Sydney, made official when it was declared as part of Ring Road 5 in 1964. Ring Road 5 was superseded by State Route 55 in 1974, but by this stage, the growth of Sydney's west had turned the bypass road into a primary arterial road with a huge increase in freight traffic. With the declaration of Pennant Hills Road as part of Cumberland Highway, State Route 55 was replaced with State Route 77, from Pearce's Corner to the interchange with James Ruse Drive, in 1988 (with the remaining southwestern section into Parrramatta now unallocated); it was replaced with Metroad 7 in 1993. State Route 30 was allocated along Pennant Hills Road between Beecroft and Castle Hill Roads from 1974; this was replaced with Metroad 2 in 1993, until it was rerouted along M2 Hills Motorway when it opened in 1997. With the opening of the Westlink M7 motorway in December 2005, the Metroad 7 route south of M2 Hills Motorway was decommissioned and rerouted onto the Westlink M7, leaving only the section north of M2 Hills Motorway along Pennant Hills Road designated as Metroad 7; Metroad 6 was extended northwards from Carlingford along Pennant Hills Road to meet M2 Hills Motorway at the same time, leaving the rest of Cumberland Highway west of Carlingford without a route number. With the conversion to the newer alphanumeric system in 2013, Pennant Hills Road was re-designated part of route A28, replacing the last remnant of Metroads 6 and 7 along it.

=== Traffic congestion ===
Pennant Hills Road has always been the main road north from Parramatta to Hornsby, but with traffic from major arterial roads of James Ruse Drive, Marsden Road, Carlingford Road, North Rocks Road, Castle Hill Road, Beecroft Road, The Comenarra Parkway and the Pacific Highway adding to that, plus the relatively recent additions of the M2 Motorway and the M1 Motorway extension to Wahroonga, the highway can get quite congested during the morning and afternoon peaks and is often characterised by the heavy population of trucks and other logistic vehicles. Pennant Hills Road is the only direct road linking the M1 and the M2, forcing interstate commercial traffic, travellers, and commuters to all compete for passage with local Hornsby Shire traffic. The average traffic flow on Pennant Hills Rd, according to a 2002 survey by the RTA, was 62,656, with the busiest area occurring around Thompsons Corner.

Plans to link the M1 with a planned North West Freeway were shelved in the late 20th century. Recently the Government has been examining a number of options to link the M1 with the M2 motorway as part of a motorway standard Sydney Bypass.

After undergoing significant studies the government constructed an M1-M2 link, dubbed the NorthConnex. Opened on 31 October 2020, NorthConnex will help alleviate traffic travelling between Western Sydney and the Central Coast.

=== Pennant Hills Road regulation ===
Since the opening of NorthConnex on 31 October 2020, a fine of A$194 with no demerit points will be imposed on truck and bus drivers who use the Pennant Hills Road instead of the new tolled tunnel, detected using gantries on either side of Pennant Hills Road. The fine only applies to drivers of trucks and buses over 12.5 metres long or over 2.8 metres clearance height, with the exception of vehicles transporting dangerous goods and oversize vehicles approved to use Pennant Hills Road.

== Exits and interchanges ==
LGA	Location	km	mi	Destinations	Notes
Hornsby	Wahroonga	0.0	0.0	Pacific Highway (A1 east, B83 north) – Calga, Hornsby, Chatswood, North Sydney	Pearces Corner intersection: northeastern terminus of highway and route A28; Northern end of Pennant Hills Road
Hornsby	Wahroonga	0.25	0.16	Pacific Motorway (M1 north) – Gosford, Newcastle, Brisbane	
Hornsby	Wahroonga	0.25	0.16	NorthConnex (M11 south) – Carlingford, Prestons	NorthConnex tunnel, southbound entry and northbound exit only
Hornsby	Pennant Hills	4.6	2.9	Northern railway line	
Hornsby	Pennant Hills	5.3	3.3	Beecroft Road – Beecroft, Epping	Southbound and northbound exits only
Hornsby	Pennant Hills	5.6	3.5	Beecroft Road – Beecroft, Epping	Southbound and northbound entrances only
Hornsby–The Hills boundary	West Pennant Hills–Beecroft boundary	7.0	4.3	Castle Hill Road – Castle Hill, Windsor	
Hornsby–The Hills boundary	West Pennant Hills–Beecroft boundary	7.9	4.9	NorthConnex – Wahroonga, Gosford, Newcastle	NorthConnex tunnel, northbound entry and southbound exit only
Hornsby–The Hills–Parramatta tripoint	West Pennant Hills–Beecroft–Carlingford tripoint	8.2	5.1	M2 Hills Motorway (M2) – Baulkham Hills, Seven Hills, Macquarie Park, Lane Cove	
Parramatta	Carlingford	10.7	6.6	Marsden Road (A6) – Eastwood, Silverwater, Sydney Olympic Park	
Parramatta	Carlingford	11.4	7.1	Parramatta Light Rail (former Carlingford railway line)	
Parramatta	North Parramatta–Oatlands boundary	14.9	9.3	James Ruse Drive (A28/A40 north, A40 south) – Northmead, Clyde	Cumberland Highway and route A28 continue north along James Ruse Drive
Parramatta	North Parramatta	16.1	10.0	Church Street – Northmead, Parramatta	Southwestern terminus of road
Incomplete access; Tolled; Route transition

== Gallery ==
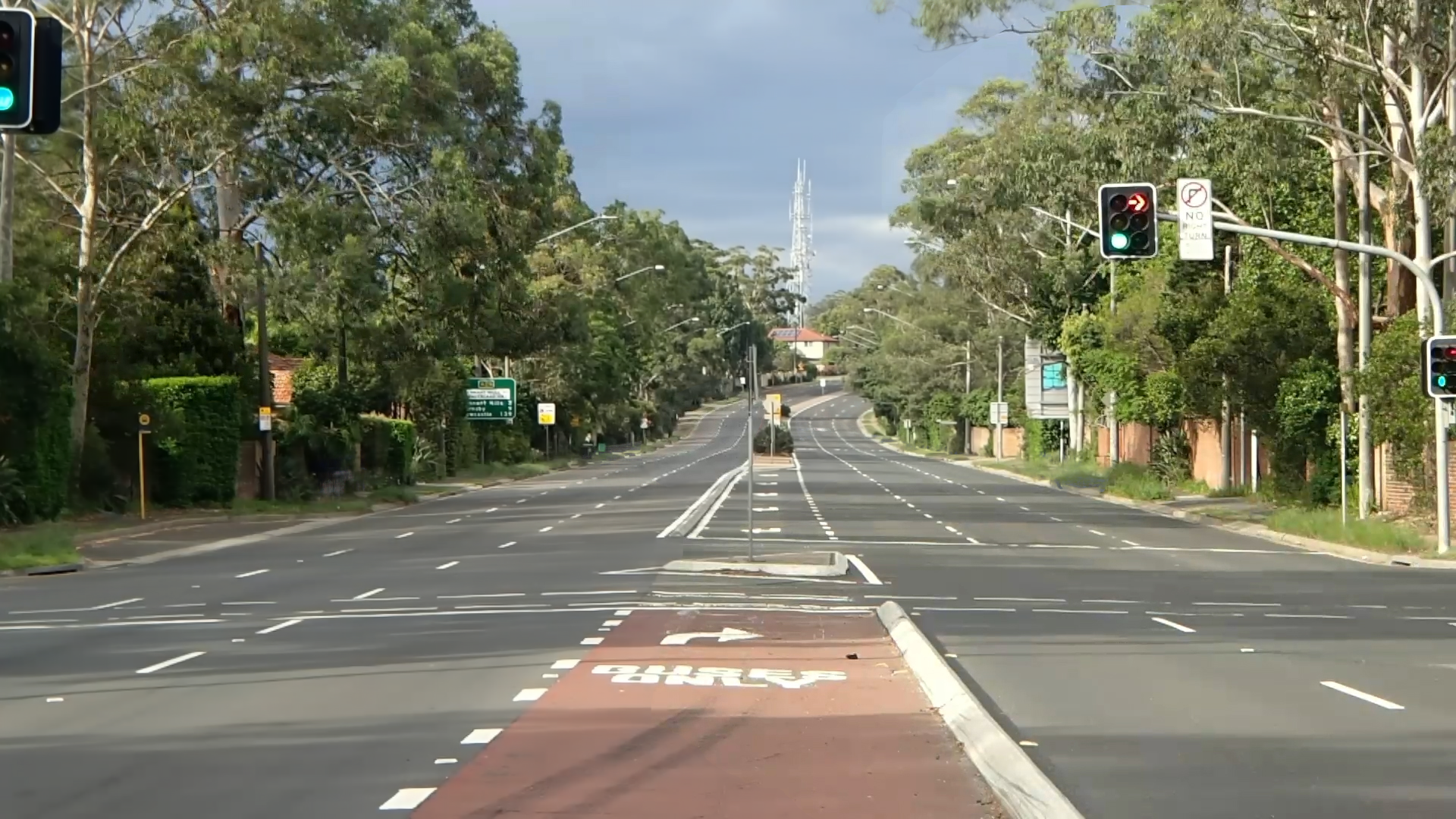
Pennant Hills Road, Cardinal Avenue Intersection, with cars edited out

== See also ==
- NorthConnex
