= Light Horse Interchange =

Road in New South Wales, Australia

Light Horse Interchange New South Wales
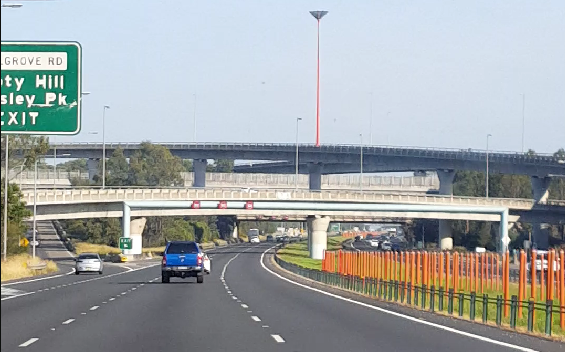
- Approaching the Light Horse Interchange on the M4 Motorway, heading eastward.
- Coordinates: 33°47′53″S 150°51′15″E

General information
- Type: Road junction
- Junction type: Modified four-level stack interchange
- Location: Eastern Creek
- Maximum height: 23 m (75 ft)
- Spans: 18
- Opened: December 2005
- Built by: Leighton Contractors, Abigroup
- Maintained by: Transport for NSW
- Roads at junction: M4 Motorway; Westlink M7; Wallgrove Road

The Light Horse Interchange is a motorway interchange located in Eastern Creek, Sydney, Australia at the junction of the M4 and M7 motorways. The interchange is the largest in Australia and was opened to traffic in December 2005. The interchange was named in honour of the Australian Light Horse Brigades of World War I, who trained at the Wallgrove Army camp that was located near the site of the interchange prior to deploying overseas.

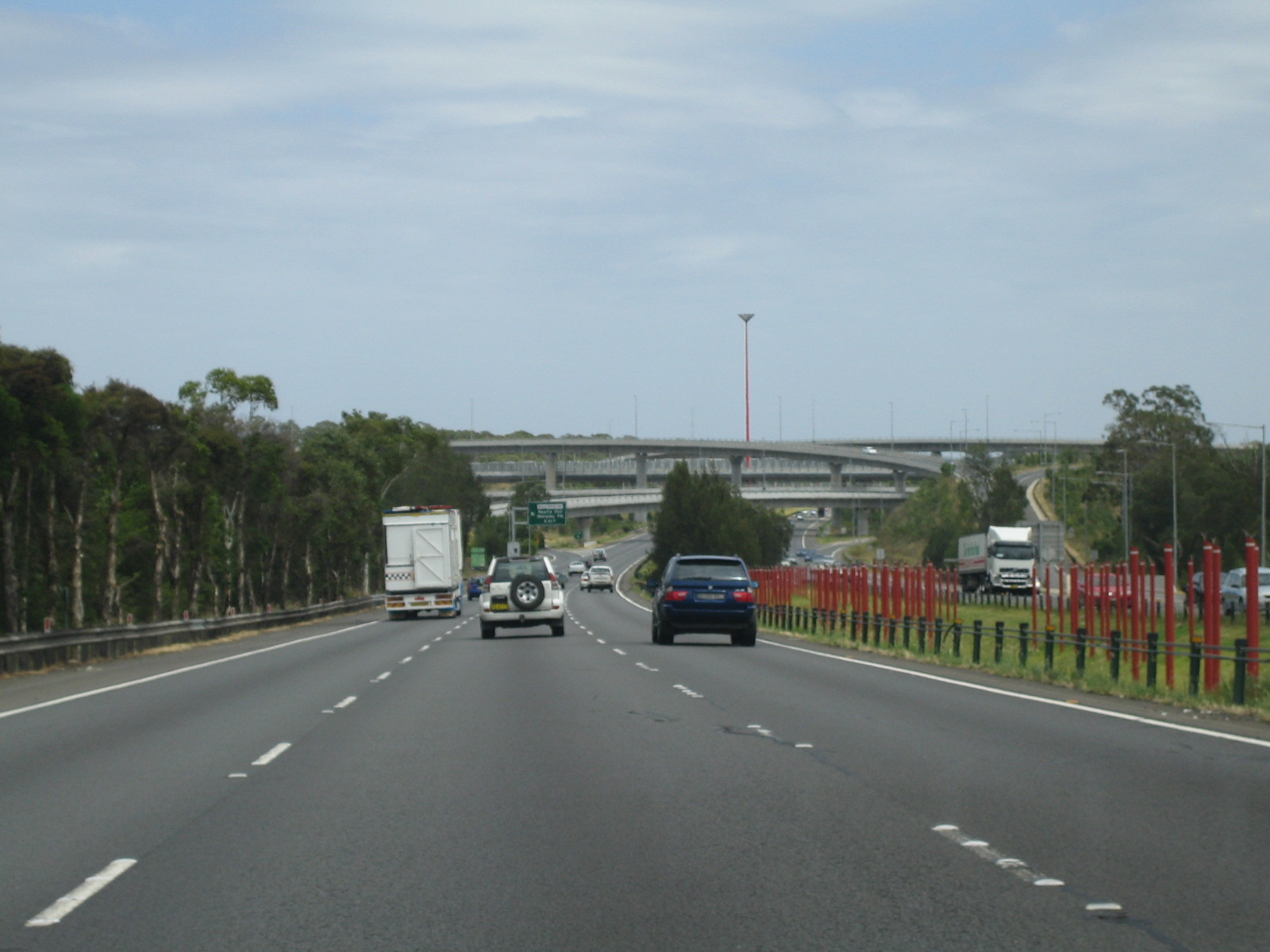
Approaching the Light Horse Interchange on the M4 Motorway.

== Design and construction ==
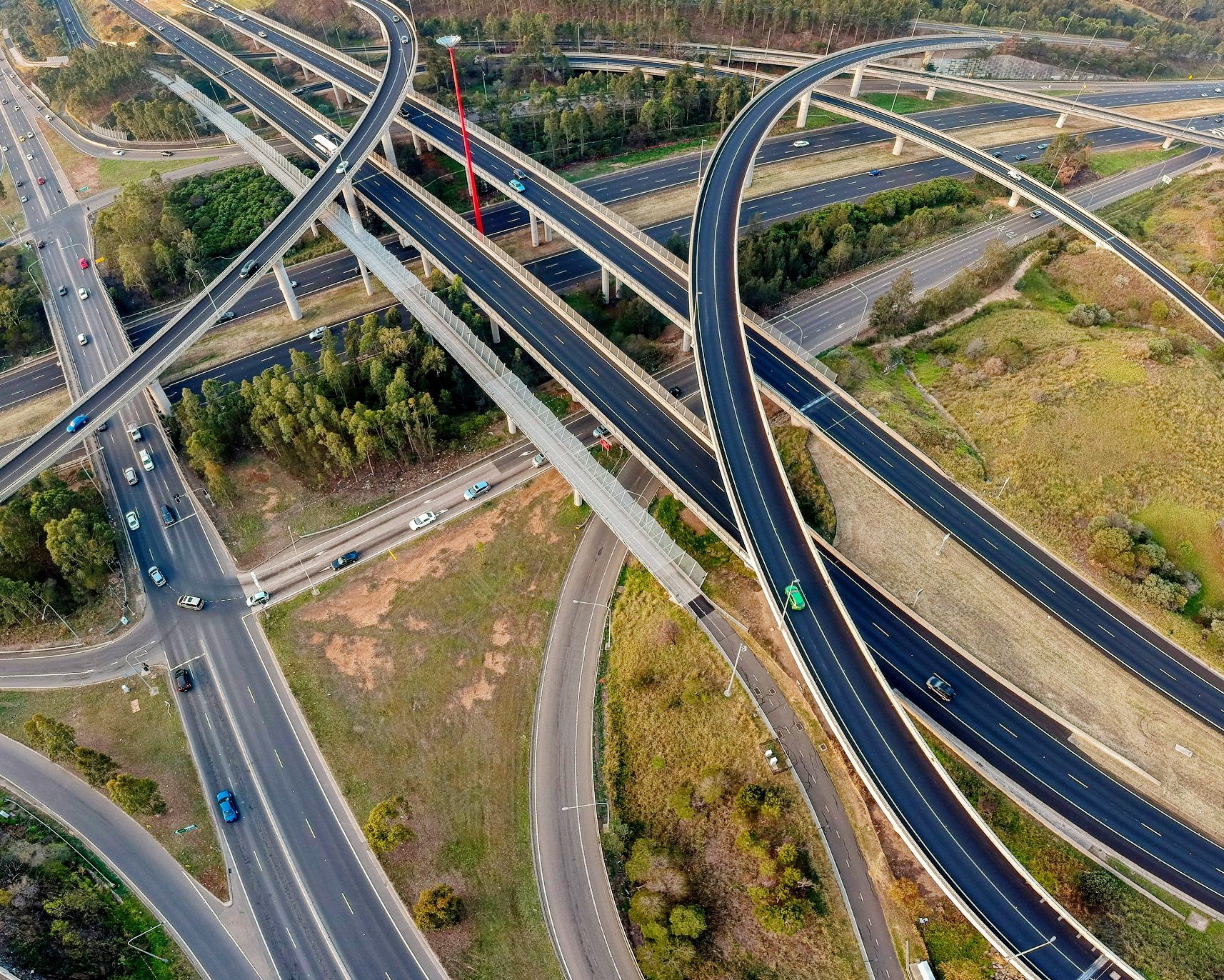
Aerial view of the interchange.

In response to a population boom in Sydney's western suburbs, the Government of New South Wales' Sydney Orbital Roads Strategy identified the need for a limited access north-south link. The Westlink M7 project would connect the three existing east-west motorways: the M5 South Western Motorway, the M4 Western Motorway and the M2 Hills Motorway catering for up to 60,000 vehicles per day and providing faster routes to the Sydney central business district. Following a request for tender in 2001, a joint venture between engineering firms Leighton Contractors and Abigroup were awarded the contract in 2003 to design and construct the Westlink M7 motorway and interchanges, including Australia's first complete four-level stack interchange.

Construction of the Light Horse Interchange began in 2003 at the site of the existing M4 Wallgrove Road exit. The new motorway overpass consisted of two spans, 431 m (1,414 ft) and 397 m (1,302 ft) carrying the main carriageways of the M7 over the existing M4. 802 individual bridge segments were used to create the main spans, 8 connecting ramps and a separate bridge carrying a shared pedestrian and cycle path. The Wallgrove Road M4 overpass was retained, with new ramp flyovers reaching a height of 16 m (52 ft) above the existing roadway and ramps. Due to the complexity of the interchange no access to the M7 was provided.

During the construction phase between 2003 and 2005, both the M4 Western Motorway and Wallgrove Road continued to carry traffic as normal. This required the use of balanced cantilever construction methods to position pre-cast concrete bridge segments at heights of up to 23 m (75 ft) above the active motorway. Upon completion, electronic tolling was implemented for vehicles entering the Westlink M7, allowing continuous flow of traffic.

== Landscaping ==
As a major feature of Sydney's road network, the Light Horse Interchange features unique landscaping and lighting. A 55 m (180 ft) steel lighting tower was installed in the centre of the interchange, designed to be visible to motorists up to 2 km (1.2 mi) away, as well as the more practical function of lighting the interchange. The tower, resembling a torch, serves as the centrepiece of the Light Horse Sculpture Parade, designed with the support of the Returned & Services League of Australia. The median strip of both the M4 and M7 motorways approaching the interchange are lined with markers which represent the Light Horse on parade. Each marker is painted red to symbolise the Flanders poppy, as well as the blood of supreme sacrifice, with white bands to represent the innocence of the soldiers leaving for war. Wire plumages atop the markers represent the emu feathers worn in the slouch hats of members of the regiment. As quarantine laws prevented the horses from returning to Australia after combat, there is no reference to horses in the sculpture.
