= Cumberland Highway =

Highway in Sydney, New South Wales, Australia

Cumberland Highway (numerous constituent roads) New South Wales
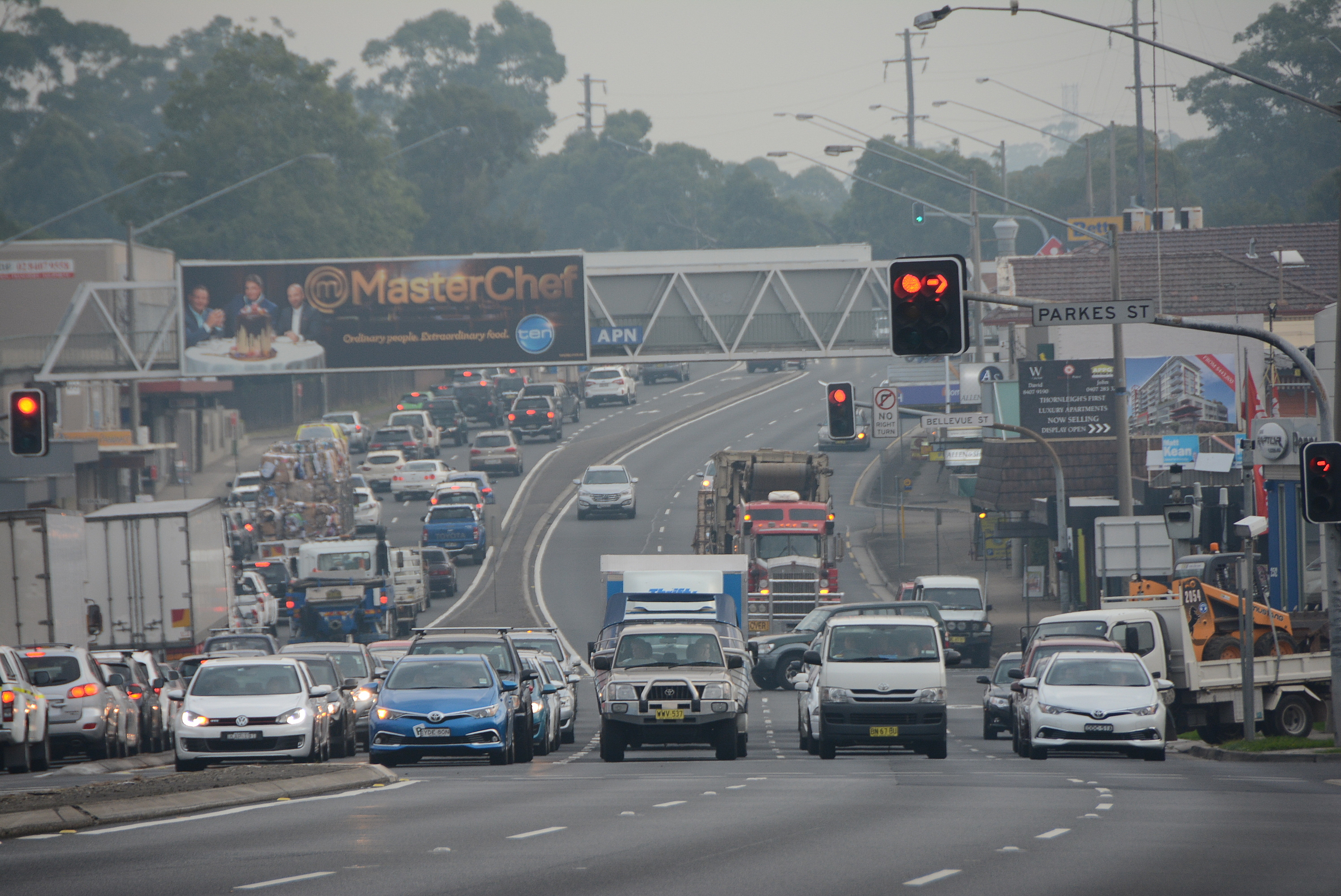
- Cumberland Highway as Pennant Hills Road at Thornleigh in 2016
- Coordinates: 33°43′12″S 151°06′22″E (Northeast end); 33°54′53″S 150°55′14″E (Southwest end)

General information
- Type: Highway
- Length: 34.2 km (21 mi)
- Gazetted: August 1928 (as Main Road 13, Pennant Hills Road); August 1988 (as State Highway 13, Cumberland Highway)
- Route number(s): A28 (2013–present) Entire length; Concurrency: A40 (2013–present) (North Parramatta–Constitution Hill)
- Former route number: See Pennant Hills Road (Wahroonga–North Parramatta); State Route 40 (2007–2013); Metroad 7 (1993–2005); State Route 77 (1988–1993); State Route 53 (1977–1988); (North Parramatta–Constitution Hill); Metroad 7 (1993–2005); State Route 77 (1988–1993); (Constitution Hill–Liverpool)

Major junctions
- Northeast end: Pacific Highway; Wahroonga, Sydney
- Pacific Motorway; NorthConnex; M2 Hills Motorway; Marsden Road; James Ruse Drive; Windsor Road; Old Windsor Road; Great Western Highway; Western Motorway
- Southwest end: Hume Highway; Liverpool, Sydney

Highway system
- Highways in Australia; National Highway • Freeways in Australia; Highways in New South Wales

Cumberland Highway is a 34-kilometre (21 mi) long urban highway located in Sydney, New South Wales, Australia. The highway links Pacific Highway and Pacific Motorway (M1) at Pearces Corner, Wahroonga in the northeast with Hume Highway at Liverpool in the southwest.

This name covers a few consecutive roads and is widely known to most drivers, but the entire allocation is also known – and signposted – by the names of its constituent parts: Pennant Hills Road, James Ruse Drive, Briens Road, Old Windsor Road, Hart Drive, Freame Street, Emert Street, Jersey Road, Betts Road, Warren Road, Smithfield Road, Palmerston Road, (New) Cambridge Street, Joseph Street and Orange Grove Road. The entire length of Cumberland Highway is designated part of route A28.

The name of the highway is derived from the Cumberland Plain and Cumberland County. The name Cumberland was conferred on the county by Governor Arthur Phillip in honour of Ernest Augustus, Duke of Cumberland.

== Route ==
Cumberland Highway commences at Pearces Corner – the intersection of Pacific Highway and Pennant Hills Road at Wahroonga – as Pennant Hills Road and heads in a southwesterly direction as a dual-carriageway, six-lane road, through Pennant Hills, narrowing to a single-carriageway, four-lane road through Carlingford, before reaching the interchange with James Ruse Drive.

Cumberland Highway then follows James Ruse Drive westwards as a dual-carriageway, six-lane road to the interchange with Windsor Road in Northmead, where it changes name to Briens Road and continues west until it intersects with and changes name to Old Windsor Road, shortly afterwards reaching the intersection with Hart Drive at Constitution Hill.

Cumberland Highway then follows Hart Drive in a southwesterly direction, changing name to Freame Street once it crosses under the North Shore and Western railway line in Wentworthville, and then intersects with and changes name to Emert Street shortly afterwards, before reaching the intersection with Great Western Highway. Cumberland Highway continues south as Jersey Road, then as Betts Road south of the intersection with Merrylands Road in Greystanes, then intersects with and changes name to Warren Road in Smithfield, heading in a southwesterly direction.

The Prospect Creek cycleway traverses underneath the highway at Smithfield. After crossing Prospect Creek it changes names again to Smithfield Road, before heading south along Palmerston Road and narrowing to a four-lane road in Fairfield West, changing name again to New Cambridge Street south of the intersection with Hamilton Road, then intersects with and changes name to Cambridge Street through Canley Heights, before it intersects with and changes name to Joseph Street in Cabramatta, before finally changing name to Orange Grove Road south of the intersection with Cabramatta Road West. The highway eventually terminates at the intersection with Hume Highway in the northern fringes of Liverpool.

== History ==
Cumberland Highway was created from a series of pre-existing roads through western and north-western suburban Sydney, not all contiguous at the time, with Pennant Hills Road in particular already declared as a major arterial route 60 years before it was eventually incorporated into the modern-day highway. Kenyons Bridge, a low-level bridge over Prospect Creek that existed as far back as the mid 19th century, was widened for Cumberland Highway at Smithfield in the 1960s. Construction of a ring road around Parramatta and increasing traffic levels in western Sydney in the late 1970s became the precursor to today's highway.

The passing of the Main Roads Act of 1924 through the Parliament of New South Wales provided for the declaration of Main Roads, roads partially funded by the State government through the Main Roads Board (later the Department of Main Roads, and eventually Transport for NSW). Main Road No. 13 was declared on 8 August 1928, from the intersection with Great Northern Highway (today Pacific Highway) at Pearce's Corner in Wahroonga, via Pennant Hills Road to Parramatta (and continuing south via Church Street and Woodville Road to the intersection with Great Southern Highway (today Hume Highway) at Lansdowne); with the passing of the Main Roads (Amendment) Act of 1929 to provide for additional declarations of State Highways and Trunk Roads, this was amended to State Highway 13 on 8 April 1929.

State Highway 13 eventually assumed the role of a western bypass of Sydney, made official when it was declared as part of Ring Road 5 in 1964. Ring Road 5 was superseded by State Route 55 in 1974, but by this stage, the growth of Sydney's west had turned the bypass road into a primary arterial road with a huge increase in freight traffic.

In December 1981, Old Windsor Road was realigned at its southern end, to feed directly into Briens Road and the final section of the Parramatta Ring Road. This new road section would eventually form part of the Cumberland Highway a few years later.

In 1984, the state government announced a new highway that would supersede the Church Street/Woodville Road route as the major connection between the Pacific and Hume Highways. The existing roads of Hart Drive, Freame Street, Emert Street, Jersey Road, Betts Road, Warren Road, Smithfield Road, Palmerston Road, Cambridge Street, Joseph Street and Orange Grove Road were widened and connected to each other to form a continuous road. The first of these to be completed was between Harris Road and Freame Street railway underpass at Wentworthville.

With the completion of the section between Great Western Highway and Jersey Road, State Highway 13 was altered to use the new route and also named Cumberland Highway on 26 August 1988, from the intersection with Pacific Highway in Wahroonga via Parramatta to the intersection with Hume Highway at Liverpool. State Route 77 was allocated to the entire length of the highway, subsuming State Route 55 between Parramatta and Wahroonga; the northern end of State Route 55 was truncated to meet State Route 77 at Pennant Hills Road. Metroad 7 replaced State Route 77 in June 1993 and the highway was designated by the Federal Government as an interim National Highway in 1994 until the completion of Westlink M7; Metroad 7 originally continued south through Liverpool and along Heathcote Road to the intersection with Princes Highway (then Metroad 1, now route A1) at Heathcote, but was truncated back to Liverpool in 1999.

The passing of the Roads Act of 1993 through the Parliament of New South Wales updated road classifications and the way they could be declared within New South Wales. Under this act, Cumberland Highway today retains its declaration as Highway 13, from the intersection with Pacific Highway in Wahroonga via Parramatta to the intersection with Hume Highway at Liverpool.

Since 1994, various parts of Cumberland Highway have been upgraded, including the widening of Pennant Hills Road.

=== Post-Westlink M7 and NorthConnex ===
With the opening of the Westlink M7 motorway in December 2005, the Metroad 7 route south of M2 Hills Motorway was decommissioned and rerouted onto the Westlink M7, leaving only the section north of M2 Hills Motorway along Pennant Hills Road designated as Metroad 7; Metroad 6 was extended northwards from Carlingford along Pennant Hills Road to meet M2 Hills Motorway at the same time, leaving the rest of Cumberland Highway west of Carlingford without a route number. With the conversion to the newer alphanumeric system in 2013, Cumberland Highway was re-designated part of route A28, replacing the last remnant of Metroads 6 and 7 along Pennant Hills Road.

NorthConnex, opened in October 2020, links the M2 Hills Motorway at West Pennant Hills with the Pacific Highway and Pacific Motorway at Wahroonga via a 9-kilometre (5.6 mi) motorway tunnel that aims to reduce congestion and improve traffic flow along the Pennant Hills Road section of Cumberland Highway. Since its opening, all trucks and buses over 12.5 metres long or over 2.8 metres clearance height (except vehicles transporting dangerous goods, oversize vehicles, or that have a genuine destination only accessible via Pennant Hills Road) travelling between the M1 and M2 are forbidden to use Pennant Hills Road and must use the NorthConnex tunnels instead. Trucks and buses will be monitored by two gantries located along Pennant Hills Road, one at Normanhurst and one at Beecroft / West Pennant Hills. A fine of A$194 with no demerit points will also be imposed on truck and bus drivers detected (with the use of cameras mounted on gantries) using Pennant Hills Road with the traffic flow.

== Exits and interchanges ==
LGA	Location	km	mi	Destinations	Notes
Hornsby	Wahroonga	0.0	0.0	Pacific Highway (A1 east, B83 north) – Calga, Hornsby, Chatswood, North Sydney	Pearces Corner intersection: northeastern terminus of highway and route A28; Northern end of Pennant Hills Road
Hornsby	Wahroonga	0.25	0.16	Pacific Motorway (M1 north) – Gosford, Newcastle, Brisbane	
Hornsby	Wahroonga	0.25	0.16	NorthConnex (M11 south) – Carlingford, Prestons	NorthConnex tunnel, southbound entry and northbound exit only
Hornsby	Pennant Hills	4.6	2.9	Main North railway line and Northern railway line	
Hornsby	Pennant Hills	5.3	3.3	Beecroft Road – Beecroft, Epping	Southbound and northbound exits only
Hornsby	Pennant Hills	5.6	3.5	Beecroft Road – Beecroft, Epping	Southbound and northbound entrances only
Hornsby–The Hills boundary	West Pennant Hills–Beecroft boundary	7.0	4.3	Castle Hill Road – Castle Hill, Windsor	
Hornsby–The Hills boundary	West Pennant Hills–Beecroft boundary	7.9	4.9	NorthConnex (M11) – Wahroonga, Gosford, Newcastle	NorthConnex tunnel, northbound entry and southbound exit only
Hornsby–The Hills–Parramatta tripoint	West Pennant Hills–Beecroft–Carlingford tripoint	8.2	5.1	M2 Hills Motorway (M2) – Baulkham Hills, Seven Hills, Macquarie Park, Lane Cove	
Parramatta	Carlingford	10.7	6.6	Marsden Road (A6) – Eastwood, Silverwater, Sydney Olympic Park	
Parramatta	Carlingford	11.4	7.1	Parramatta Light Rail (former Carlingford railway line)	
Parramatta	North Parramatta–Oatlands boundary	14.9	9.3	James Ruse Drive (A40 south) – Rosehill, Clyde, to M4 Western Motorway (M4); Pennant Hills Road (west) – North Parramatta, Parramatta	Cumberland Highway continues north along James Ruse Drive, east along Pennant Hills Road; Eastern terminus of concurrency with route A40
Parramatta	Northmead–North Rocks boundary	16.6	10.3	Windsor Road – Windsor, Parramatta	Eastern end of James Ruse Drive, western end of Briens Road
Parramatta	Northmead	17.8	11.1	Briens Road – Westmead, to Westmead and Children's hospitals	Cumberland Highway continues north along Old Windsor Road
Toongabbie Creek		18.1	11.2	Bridge (no known official name)	
Parramatta	Northmead–Constitution Hill boundary	18.2	11.3	Old Windsor Road (A40 north) – Seven Hills, Rouse Hill, Windsor	Cumberland Highway continues west along Hart Drive; Western terminus of concurrency with route A40
Parramatta	Wentworthville	19.7	12.2	Darcy Road – Westmead, Westmead and Children's hospitals	
Parramatta–Cumberland boundary	Wentworthville	20.1	12.5	North Shore and Western and Cumberland railway lines	
Cumberland	Wentworthville–Wentworthville South–Greystanes tripoint	21.2	13.2	Great Western Highway (A44) – Penrith, Parramatta	Southern end of Emert Street, northern end of Jersey Road
Cumberland	Wentworthville South–Greystanes boundary	21.4	13.3	M4 Western Motorway (M4) – Emu Plains, Parramatta, Sydney CBD	
Prospect Creek		25.9	16.1	Kenyons Bridge	
Fairfield	Smithfield	26.5	16.5	The Horsley Drive – Fairfield, Wetherill Park	
Fairfield	Smithfield–Fairfield West boundary	27.9	17.3	Polding Street (west, east) – Fairfield, Prairiewood; Smithfield Road (southwest) – Edensor Park	Cumberland Highway continues south along Palmerston Road
Orphan School Creek		29.5	18.3	Bridge (no known official name)	
Fairfield	Cabramatta–Cabramatta West boundary	32.3	20.1	Cabramatta Road West – Cabramatta, Bonnyrigg	Southern end of Joseph Street, northern end of Orange Grove Road
Cabramatta Creek		32.9	20.4	Bridge (no known official name)	
Liverpool	Liverpool–Warwick Farm boundary	34.2	21.3	Hume Highway (A22 east, A28 south) – Prestons, Liverpool, Bankstown, Sydney CBD to M5 South Western Motorway (M5) – Canberra, Melbourne	Southwestern terminus of highway, route A28 continues south along Hume Highway; Southern end of Orange Grove Road
Incomplete access; Tolled; Route transition

== Gallery ==
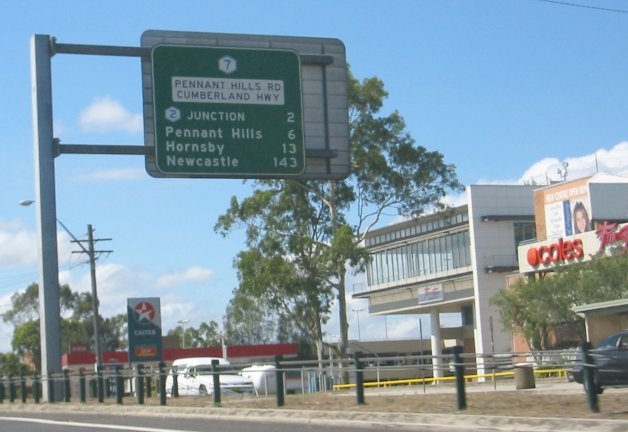
Cumberland Highway as Pennant Hills Road overhead road sign north-eastbound at Carlingford

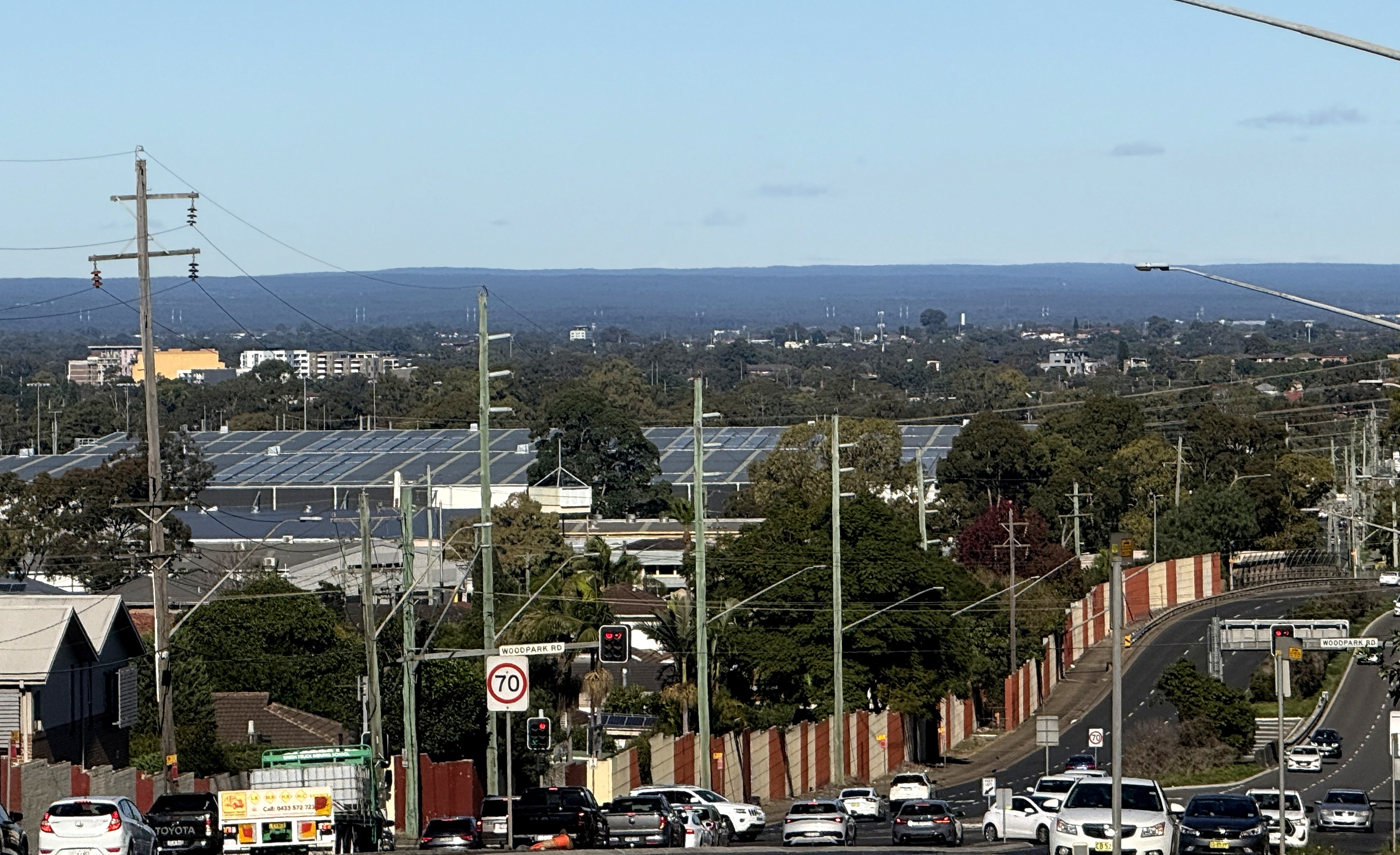
Cumberland Highway (Betts Road section), near Canal Road and Woodpark Road in Greystanes, with the skyline of Fairfield in the background.

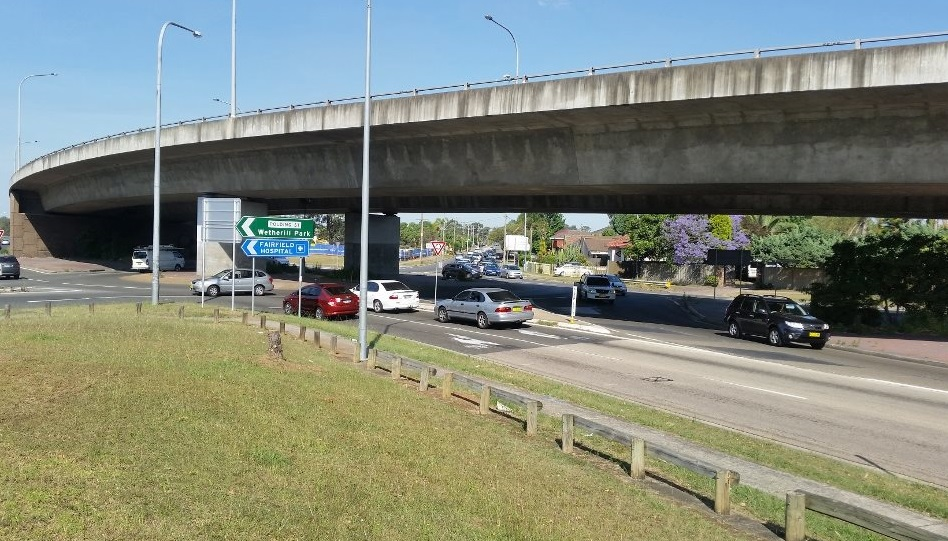
Cumberland Highway overpassing Polding Street in Fairfield West.

== See also ==
- NorthConnex
