= M2 Hills Motorway =

Motorway in Sydney, New South Wales, Australia

Hills Motorway New South Wales
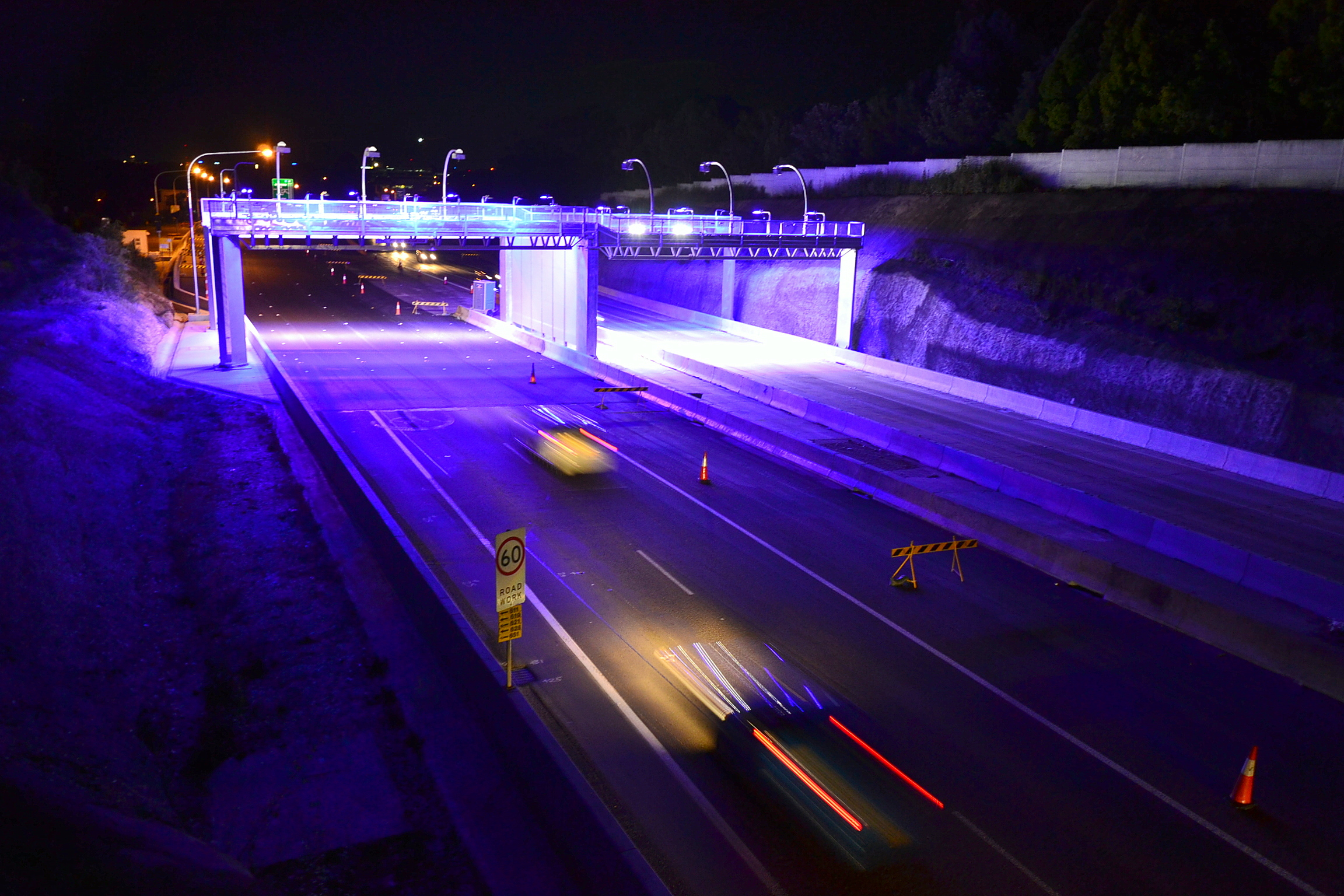
- Toll gantries at Macquarie Park
- Coordinates: 33.766478°S 150.964131°E (West end); 33.799767°S 151.141996°E (East end)

General information
- Type: Motorway
- Length: 19.3 km (12 mi)
- Opened: 26 May 1997
- Gazetted: 28 June 1993
- Route number(s): M2 (2013–present)
- Former route number: Metroad 2 (1997–2013)

Major junctions
- West end: Westlink M7; Seven Hills, Sydney
- Old Windsor Road; Cumberland Highway; NorthConnex; Lane Cove Road; Delhi Road
- East end: Lane Cove Tunnel; North Ryde, Sydney

Location(s)
- Major suburbs: Epping, Beecroft, Carlingford, Baulkham Hills

Highway system
- Highways in Australia; National Highway • Freeways in Australia; Highways in New South Wales

M2 Hills Motorway is a 19.3-kilometre (12.0 mi) tolled urban motorway in Sydney, New South Wales that is part of the Sydney Orbital Network and the National Highway west of Pennant Hills Road. Owned by toll road operator Transurban, it forms majority of Sydney's M2 route, with the Lane Cove Tunnel constituting the rest of the M2 route.

== Route ==
M2 Hills Motorway connects directly with the Westlink M7 in Seven Hills and heads southeast as a four-lane dual-carriageway road through Baulkham Hills, widening to six lanes past the single point urban interchange with Windsor Road, and then in an easterly direction to Beecroft, where it meets an interchange with both Pennant Hills Road and the NorthConnex tunnel. It continues south-east past Epping and through Macquarie Park, narrowing back to four lanes past the interchange with Lane Cove Road, to eventually dive under Epping Road and cross the Lane Cove River in North Ryde, where it connects directly to the Lane Cove Tunnel. The motorway runs underneath the suburb of North Epping via 460-metre (1,510 ft) twin tunnels known as the Epping/Norfolk tunnels.

The M2 cycleway is located on the breakdown lanes of the M2 Hills Motorway.

== History ==
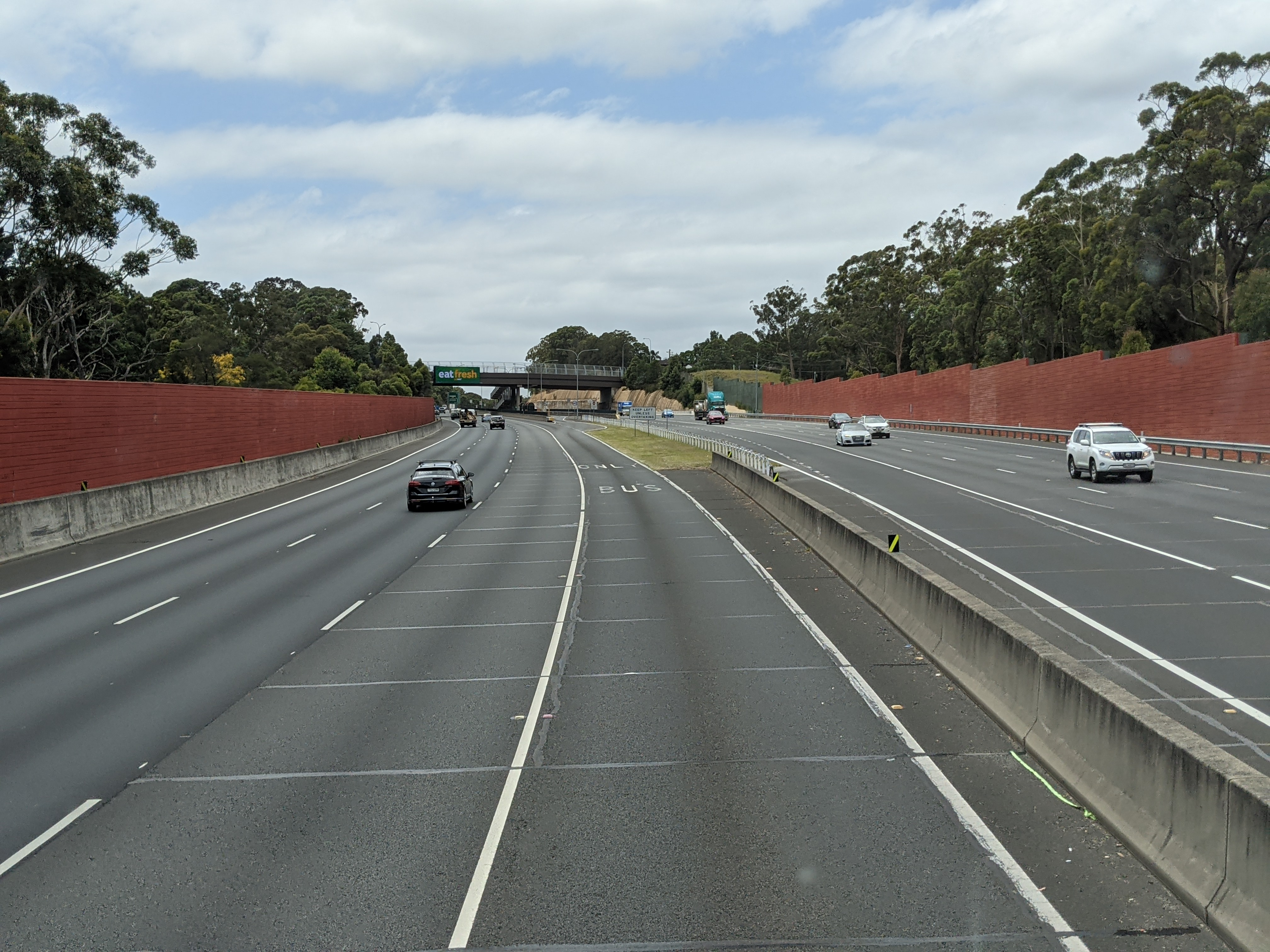
View heading eastbound along the M2 motorway

=== Castlereagh Freeway ===
Road approaches from Sydney's western suburbs were originally slow and traffic passed through Parramatta and to the city centre via Victoria Road and Western Freeway. Parramatta was bypassed in 1986, however peak hour traffic still clogged up Victoria Road and all western approaches to Sydney.

Proposals for an F2 Castlereagh Freeway were released in 1968. The freeway would branch from the proposed Lane Cove Valley Expressway (F3) near Herring Road at North Ryde (now Macquarie Park), and head west towards the western suburbs as far as Londonderry at the foot of the Blue Mountains.

Protests in 1974 led to suspension of works and cancellation of Lane Cove Valley Expressway in 1977. The Castlereagh Freeway proposal was thus extended eastwards over the Lane Cove Valley Expressway corridor to the junction of Epping Road and Pittwater Road near the Channel 10 North Ryde site. A possible connection to Fig Tree Bridge was also considered.

==== 1989 Proposal ====
Land for the F2 freeway was purchased by NSW Government in 1988 and the road from Gladesville Bridge to Hunters Hill (Fig Tree Bridge) was built to freeway-style standards. Between June and July 1989, the newly formed Roads & Traffic Authority (RTA) exhibited the Environmental Impact Statement (EIS) that proposed a 11.5 km four-lane Castlereagh Freeway between Pennant Hills Road and Lane Cove River at North Ryde, known as F2 Stage 1. In the proposal, the link to Epping Road at Marsfield, and the link to Fig Tree Bridge at Hunters Hill were abandoned.

Subsequently, a Commission of Inquiry on the 1989 proposal was set up and chaired by the commissioner John Woodward. In July 1990, the commissioner released a report recommending that the freeway should not be built, but instead upgrade the east–west road system between Pennant Hills Road and Epping Road at North Ryde. The report stressed that the findings only applied to the 1989 proposal (i.e. east of Pennant Hills Road) and "should not be taken in any way to be a judgment on the construction of the roadway west of Pennant Hills Road".

The commission also mentioned that if an expressway were to be built, North Epping residents had indicated that they would prefer a tunnel under the locality instead of a cut and fill which they deemed excessive. The commission was also in support of a tunnel if the expressway was to be built. The tunnel was incorporated in later design proposals and was eventually built as the Epping/Norfolk Tunnel.

=== 1992 Proposal ===
In September 1990, the Minister of Roads Wal Murray announced a preparation of a new EIS for a transport link for Sydney's North West region, later known as the North West Transport Link. The transport link was proposed to connect Old Windsor Road in Seven Hills to Epping Road in North Ryde, bypassing Carlingford and Epping Roads. The proposed link would continue eastwards onto Epping Road, then would connect with Gore Hill Freeway at Artarmon, which led to Warringah Freeway at North Sydney and Bradfield Highway, the Sydney Harbour Bridge and the Sydney central business district.

Environmental impact assessments were done separately for the section between Old Windsor Road and Pennant Hills Road (western section) and the section between Pennant Hills Road and Epping Road (eastern section), by SMEC and Maunsell respectively. However, the two assessments were to be done in cooperation to ensure integration of the proposal.

The Roads & Traffic Authority had a "predetermination" to build the F2 and disregard the main recommendation of the Commission of Inquiry, according to Freedom of Information documents obtained in 1993. The Environmental Impact Statement for the eastern F2 did not quantify congestion generated by the F2 and Epping Road towards the city, though this was documented in a 1990 report.

==== Western Section ====
There were three shortlisted options for utilising the Castlereagh Freeway reserve between Old Windsor Road and Pennant Hills Road in the western section:

- Option 1: Four-lane expressway via the reserve with a busway in the median, continuing to a proposed expressway east of Pennant Hills Road (i.e. eastern section). No toll and two toll options were considered for this alternative.
- Option 2: Four-lane expressway via the reserve, terminating at Pennant Hills Road. Pennant Hills Road, Carlingford Road and Epping Road would be upgraded and continue as the arterial route east of the expressway. The busway would be in the median between Old Windsor Road and Barclay Road, before continuing along Barclays, North Rocks, Pennant Hills, and Carlingford Roads. This alternative would not be tolled.
- Option 3: Arterial road via the reserve between Old Windsor Road and Barclays Road, before continuing along Barclay, North Rocks, Pennant Hills, and Carlingford Roads. Exclusive bus lanes would be provided on the kerb lanes of the new road.

Option 3 was evaluated to have the least environmental impact but have the worst transport efficiency and safety out of the three; it also received little support from the community. As such, Option 3 was eliminated from further evaluation and detailed assessment. Option 1 was eventually chosen as the design of the expressway.

==== Eastern Section ====
During the assessment, the 1989 proposal was not considered.

One busway lane in each direction would be in the centre of the expressway between Pennant Hills Road and Beecroft Road, continuing from the proposed busway in the western section. The busway would leave the expressway and would lead via Beecroft Road to a bus interchange at Epping Station. It would be constructed to allow for a future conversion to light rail. Grade-separated interchanges would be built at Delhi Road, Lane Cove Road, Balaclava Road (now Christie Road) and Beecroft Road. The eastern section will connect to the western section at the grade-separated Pennant Hills Road interchange.

=== Construction ===
In May 1993, the government announced that the road would be constructed with private funds using a Build Own Operate Transfer. The government then entered into an agreement with Hills Motorway Limited to build and operate the M2 for 45 years, before ownership reverted to the government.

A two-lane busway was built in the median between Windsor Road to Beecroft Road with a connection to Epping railway station. There were dedicated access ramps for buses, which were removed in 2012 during road works to widen the motorway. Mahers Road in Carlingford, running east–west along the southern boundary of Pennant Hills Golf Course, was subsumed into the new expressway. Pennant Hills Road was also realigned near Mahers Road, with the old section of the road now known as Mahers Close.

==== Protests ====
There was strong community opposition to the construction of the motorway by local residents and environment groups including the Nature Conservation Council, as the route would destroy a vast area of valuable urban bushland, the money would be better spent on public transport infrastructure and the air pollution from private motor vehicles would contribute to global warming. There were also fears the bus lanes might be removed in the future to provide additional capacity for private vehicles. "Freeway Busters" was one of the groups that organised protests, including two "Cyclestormings" of the construction site by hundreds of cyclists. The opening ceremony of the tollway in 1997, a champagne breakfast for conservative dignitaries including Alan Jones and a "celebrity drive-through" featuring swimmer Susie Maroney, was disrupted by sound systems mounted high in gum trees, playing the sound of car crashes, ambulance sirens and jack-hammers. After the motorway opened, cyclists also protested the toll which the operators charged cyclists by occupying the toll plaza. This protest was successful, and the toll was subsequently dropped.

=== Operation ===
The project was opened on 26 May 1997. After opening, the road's usage had been nearly 30% below forecasts in a 1994 prospectus, however, morning peak traffic had sometimes exceeded those same forecasts for short bursts.

The passing of the Roads Act of 1993 updated road classifications and the way they could be declared within New South Wales. Under this act, the Roads & Traffic Authority (later Transport for NSW) declared the Hills Motorway as Tollway 6002, from its interchange with Old Windsor Road in Seven Hills to the interchange with the Epping Road in North Ryde, on 28 June 1993, nearly four years before it had officially opened; the tollway today still retains this declaration. In May 2024, the NSW Government Gazette revoked the declaration of the tollway on one parcel of land.

The Westlink M7, opened on 16 December 2005, continues along the original Castlereagh Freeway alignment from Seven Hills to Dean Park, where the M7 turns south away from the Castlereagh Freeway corridor towards the M5 South-West Motorway and Hume Motorway at Prestons. The unused but still-reserved corridor continues west and passes north of suburbs including Shalvey and Willmot, continuing west past Llandilo to stop abruptly near Londonderry at the foot of the Blue Mountains.

The Lane Cove Tunnel, which linked the motorway directly to Gore Hill Freeway at Lane Cove, opened on 25 March 2007.

A third traffic lane westbound between the Lane Cove Road and Beecroft Road interchanges which utilises a former cycling/breakdown lane opened in April 2007. This change was criticised by cyclists, who were required to use an alternative route as a result, and by some motorists who have said that the addition of a third lane will induce more traffic and would only shift the bottleneck further down the motorway as a result of assisting and maintaining free-flowing traffic from the Lane Cove Tunnel. A speed camera to enforce the 70 km/h limit was introduced on the westbound carriageway just before the Epping/Norfolk Road tunnel.

Tolling became fully cashless with no toll booths 30 January 2012. Transurban had originally proposed that it would become cashless from December 2007.

A major upgrade started in January 2011, with more on-and off-ramps being built, including off-ramps onto Windsor Road eastbound, which was completed in July 2012, and a westbound off-ramp and eastbound on-ramp at Macquarie Park, which were completed in January 2013. During the upgrade, the fixed speed camera installed before the Epping/Norfolk Road tunnel was removed in mid-2013, and by November 2014 the speed limit was lifted to 100 km/h limit along the length of the motorway.

With its opening, Metroad 2 between North Ryde and Baulkham Hills was re-routed from arterial roads through Epping and Castle Hill to the motorway. With the conversion to the newer alphanumeric system in 2013, Metroad 2 was replaced by route M2.

After initially refusing to include construction of east-facing ramps to Lane Cove Road as a part of the M2 Upgrade Project, Transurban and the NSW Government reached agreement to construct a new on-ramp in February 2013. The tolled ramp, which allows southbound traffic from Lane Cove Road to enter the motorway towards Sydney, eliminating the need to travel through the busy Macquarie Park area to enter the motorway through the Epping Road or Macquarie Park on-ramps, opened in July 2014. There was no provision for northbound traffic from Lane Cove Road to enter the motorway eastbound, nor for westbound motorway traffic to exit at Lane Cove Road.

On 20 March 2018, the Government of New South Wales and Transurban started testing driverless cars on M2 Hills Motorway. The launch coincided with the death of a pedestrian struck by a similarly human-supervised autonomous vehicle in Arizona.

=== Connection to NorthConnex ===
The NorthConnex tunnel opened on 31 October 2020, including motorway-to-motorway ramps to and from the M2 Hills Motorway west of Pennant Hills Road/Cumberland Highway; connecting between NorthConnex and the eastern portion of the motorway is via ramps from Pennant Hills Road.

== Tolls ==
M2 Hills Motorway uses a cashless tolling system, where tolls are charged on the basis of vehicles being either Class A (which includes most private vehicles) or Class B (vehicles with two axles and are over 2.8 metres high, or vehicles with three axles which are over 2 metres high, or vehicles with more than three axles). Toll prices are updated four times a year.

=== Ownership ===
At opening, the motorway was owned by the Hills Motorway Group, which was owned by Colonial First State (26.7%), Abigroup (8.1%), Obayashi Corporation (8.1%), Mercantile Mutual, Portfolio Partners and AMP Limited. Macquarie Infrastructure Group (MIG) later purchased Obayashi's 8.1% share. In 2000, MIG planned to take over Hills Motorway Group but this did not eventuate. In April 2004, Transurban acquired Abigroup's 8.1% stake of the motorway. In February 2005, Transurban mounted a takeover bid of Hills Motorway for $1.8 billion. The takeover bid was successful and finalised in May 2005.

Separate to ownership, in January 2006, Transurban acquired Tollaust, which managed the tolls and operated and maintained the motorway. Tollaust was also owned by Abigroup. The acquisition was completed in February 2006.

The concessional tolling period ends in June 2048. It was originally planned to end in 2042, before it was extended to May 2046.

Toll prices as of 1 July 2025
Toll road	Class A toll prices (Note: Class A vehicles are typically cars and motorcycles; Class B vehicles are all other vehicles including trucks and heavy vehicles.)	Class B toll prices	Toll increase	Toll concessionaire	Expiry of toll concession
M2 Hills Motorway	$3.00 (min.) $10.15 (max.)	$9.01 (min.) $30.45 (max.)	Quarterly on 1 January, 1 April, 1 July, and 1 October, by the greater of quarterly CPI or 1%	Transurban	June 2048

== Interchanges ==
LGA	Location	km	mi	Destinations	Notes
The Hills	Winston Hills–Baulkham Hills boundary	0.0	0.0	Westlink M7 (northwest) – Lithgow, Canberra, Melbourne	Western terminus of motorway, continues west as Westlink M7
The Hills	Winston Hills–Baulkham Hills boundary	0.0	0.0	Old Windsor Road (A2 north, A40 south) – Windsor, Parramatta; Abbott Road (west) – Seven Hills	Eastbound entrance and westbound exit only Western terminus of route M2, continues north along Old Windsor Road as route A2
The Hills–Parramatta boundary	Baulkham Hills	3.3	2.1	Windsor Road – Parramatta, Baulkham Hills, Castle Hill	
The Hills–Parramatta–Hornsby tripoint	West Pennant Hills–Carlingford–Beecroft tripoint	8.3	5.2	Pennant Hills Road (Cumberland Highway, A28) – Wahroonga, Carlingford	
The Hills–Parramatta–Hornsby tripoint	West Pennant Hills–Carlingford–Beecroft tripoint	8.3	5.2	NorthConnex (M11) – Gosford, Newcastle, Brisbane	Westbound entrance and eastbound exit via Pennant Hills Road
Parramatta–Hornsby boundary	Cheltenham	11.7	7.3	Beecroft Road – Epping, Beecroft	Eastbound entrance and westbound exit
Parramatta–Hornsby boundary	Epping–North Epping boundary	11.9– 12.4	7.4– 7.7	Epping / Norfolk Tunnel	
Ryde	Macquarie Park	14.6	9.1	Toll point	
Ryde	Macquarie Park	15.4	9.6	Christie Road – Macquarie Park, Macquarie University Hospital	Eastbound entrance and exit
Ryde	Macquarie Park	15.7	9.8	Talavera Road – Macquarie Park, Macquarie University Hospital	Westbound entrance and exit
Ryde	Macquarie Park	17.0	10.6	Lane Cove Road (A3) – Pymble, Ryde	No exit westbound; no eastbound entrance from A3 northbound
Ryde	Macquarie Park–North Ryde boundary	18.4	11.4	Delhi Road (A38) – Chatswood, Ryde	Westbound entrance and eastbound exit
Ryde	North Ryde	19.3	12.0	Epping Road – Ryde, Epping	Westbound entrance from and eastbound exit to from Epping Road
Ryde	North Ryde	19.3	12.0	Lane Cove Tunnel (M2) – Sydney CBD, Sydney Airport	Eastern terminus of motorway, route M2 continues east along Lane Cove Tunnel
1.000 mi = 1.609 km; 1.000 km = 0.621 mi: Incomplete access; Tolled

== See also ==
- Freeways in Australia
