= M4 Motorway (Sydney) =

Motorway in Sydney

M4 Motorway New South Wales

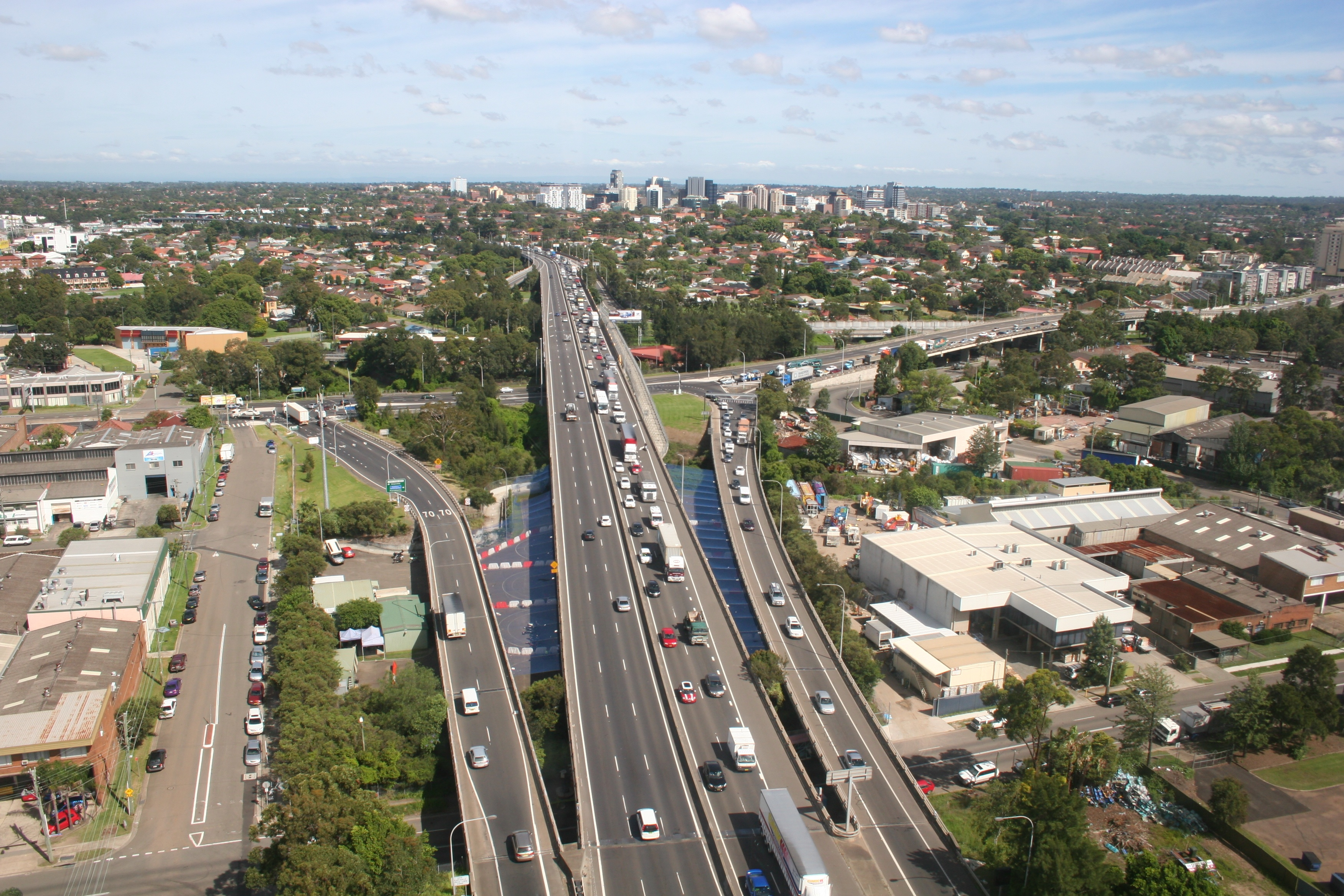
- Aerial view looking west in December 2010
- Coordinates: 33.764612°S 150.639941°E (West end); 33.867824°S 151.180681°E (East end)

General information
- Type: Motorway
- Length: 54.8 km (34 mi)
- Opened: 1971–1993 (Glenbrook–Strathfield); 2019–2023 (Strathfield–Rozelle)
- Gazetted: February 1977
- Route number(s): M4 (2013–present)
- Former route number: Metroad 4 (1992–2013); Freeway F4 (1973–1992); National Route 32 (1971–1992)

Major junctions
- West end: Great Western Highway; Glenbrook, Sydney
- Westlink; Prospect Highway; Cumberland Highway; Great Western Highway; City West Link; Great Western Highway; Iron Cove Link; M8 Motorway
- East end: Western Distributor; Rozelle, Sydney

Location(s)
- Major suburbs: Penrith, Prospect, Parramatta, Granville, Clyde, Auburn, Homebush, Concord

Highway system
- Highways in Australia; National Highway • Freeways in Australia; Highways in New South Wales

The M4 Motorway is a 55-kilometre (34 mi) series of partially tolled dual carriageway motorways in Sydney designated as route M4. The M4 designation is part of the wider A4 and M4 route designation, the M4 runs parallel and/or below ground to Great Western Highway, Parramatta Road and City West Link, which are part of route A44.

The M4 Motorway comprises two connected parts:

- Western Motorway is the original section, completed between 1971 and 1993 between Glenbrook and Concord, before continuing west as Great Western Highway through the Blue Mountains towards Bathurst. In 2017, the section between Church Street in Parramatta to Concord was widened and tolled as part of WestConnex.
- M4 East Motorway, an eastern tunnel extension of the M4 from Homebush to Rozelle was completed between 2019 and 2023 as part of WestConnex. This extension had been proposed since the 1990s. Its eastern end is the Rozelle Interchange with connections with the M8 Motorway, Victoria Road and the Anzac Bridge.

== Route ==
Western Motorway commences at the transition point from Great Western Highway in Glenbrook and heads in an easterly direction as a four-lane, dual-carriageway road, crossing the Nepean River and widening to six lanes at the interchange with Mulgoa Road in Regentville, then widening again to eight lanes at the interchange with Roper and Erskine Park Roads in Erskine Park. The motorway passes under Wallgrove Road and Westlink M7 at the four-level Light Horse Interchange, continuing east through Prospect and Merrylands. At the interchange with Church Street and Woodville Road in Parramatta, tolling begins and the motorway splits into three carriageways (one four lanes eastbound, two dual-lane westbound), before merging back into two carriageways just west of the Duck River in Clyde. East of the interchange with Homebush Bay and Centenary Drives, the original four-lane alignment of Western Motorway branches off to run along the surface to its old terminus with Great Western Highway outside Concord, and the newer six-lane M4 East alignment enters tunnels and continues eastwards underground. The motorway eventually terminates just east of the Rozelle Interchange, returning to the surface at Rozelle to connect to the Western Distributor.

The M4 cycleway runs parallel to the M4 Motorway between Sydney Olympic Park and South Wentworthville.

== History ==
=== Alignment ===
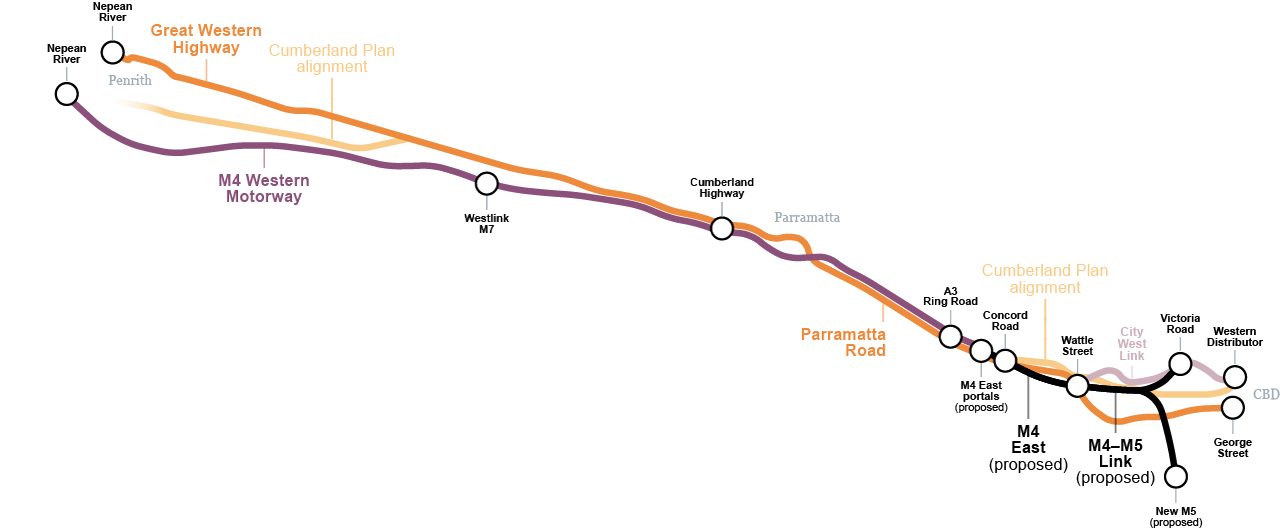

The first main road west from Sydney was Great Western Highway, shown above in orange. The County of Cumberland planning scheme provided for a modified route west, much of which was later built as M4 Western motorway. With the opening of the M4 East Tunnel and Rozelle Interchange in 2019 and 2023 respectively, the M4 today extends as far east as the Anzac Bridge.

=== Western Freeway ===
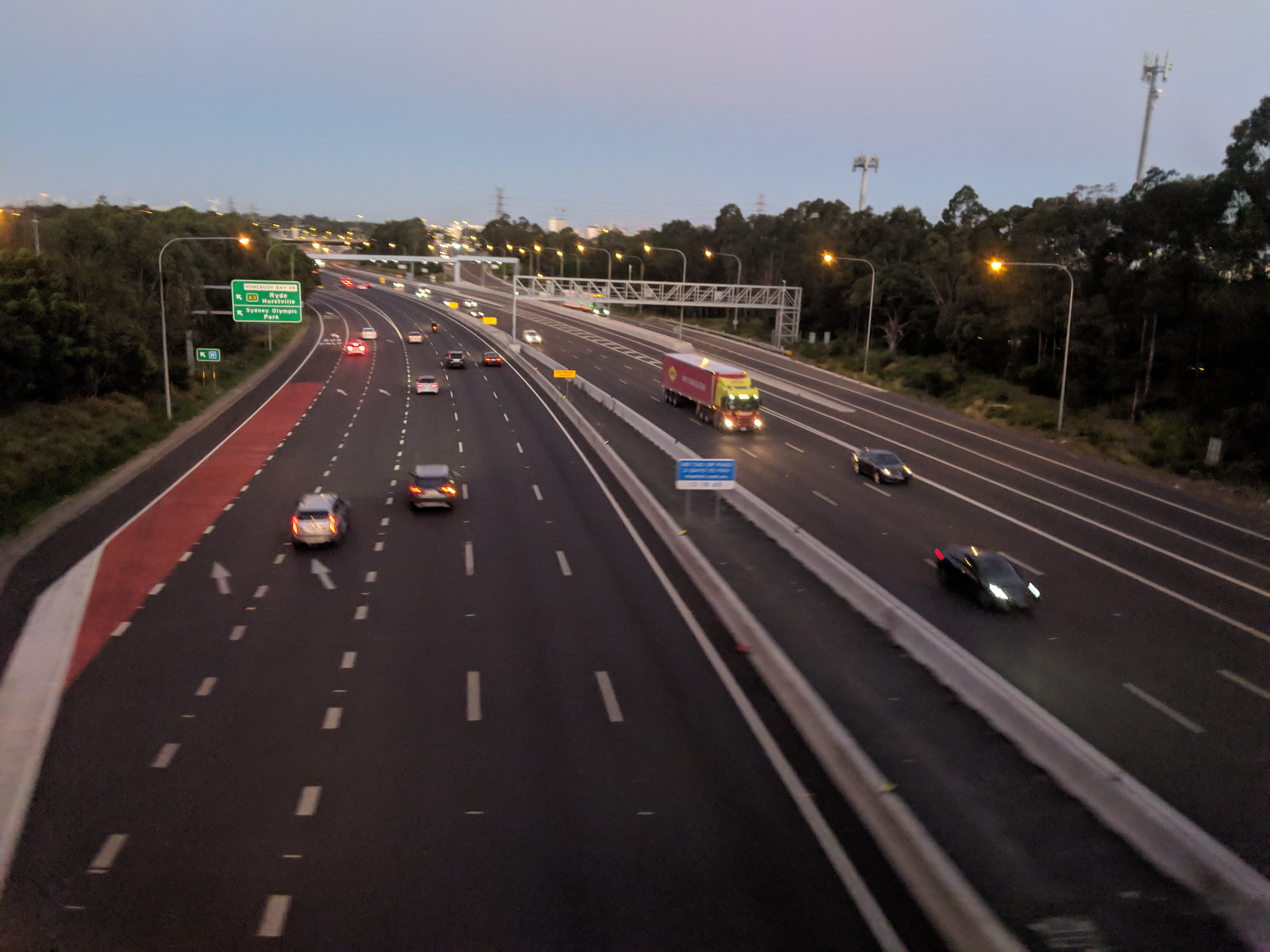
M4 Motorway looking East from the Olympic Park line

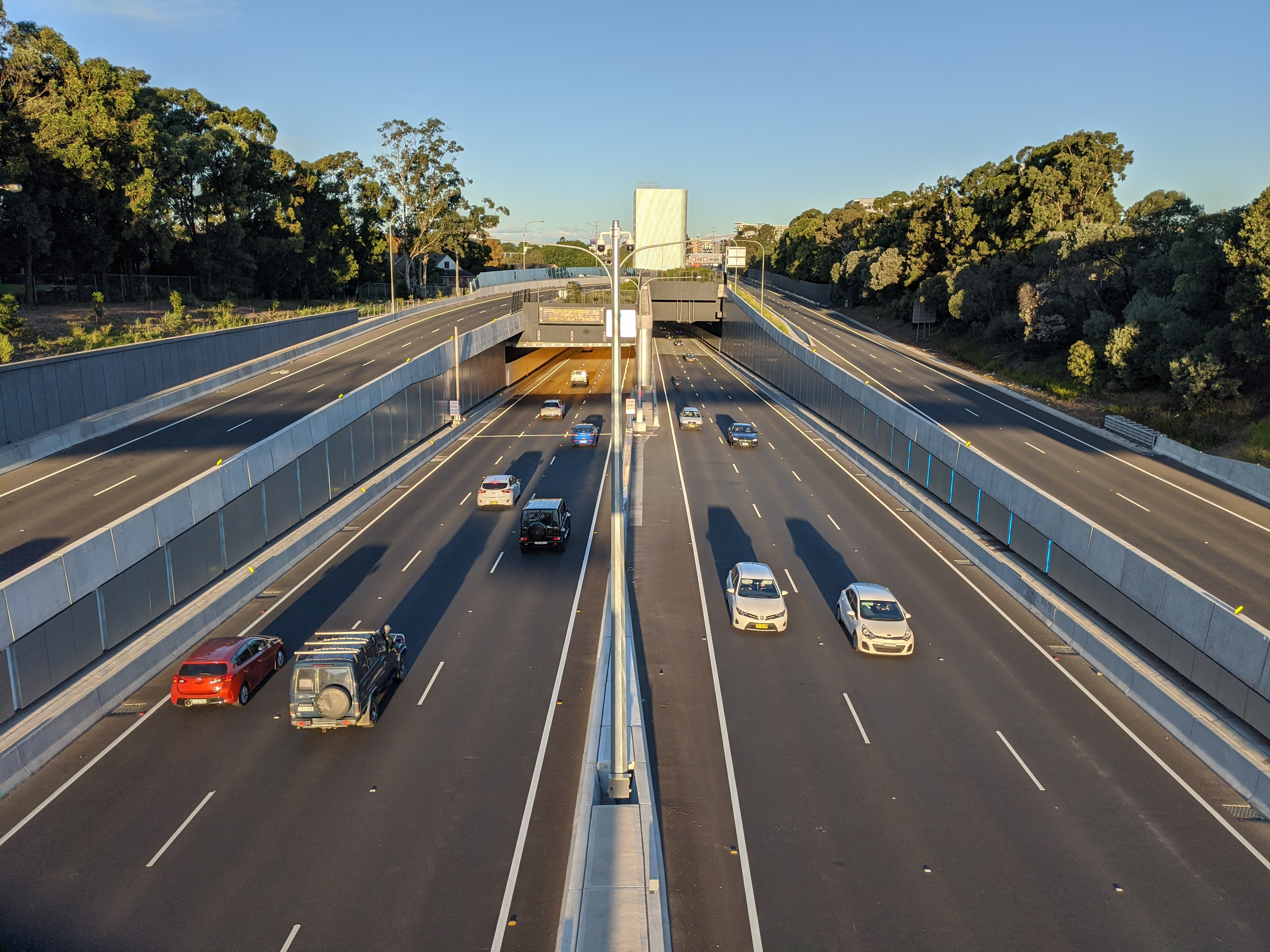
M4 tunnel entrance at North Strathfield looking east

The Western Freeway was originally constructed in several stages between the late 1960s and the mid-1980s: the first 5 km-long section between Emu Plains and Regentville (including a new single carriageway bridge over the Nepean River, duplicated in 1986) opened in October 1971; the second 14.5 km-long section between Regentville and Eastern Creek opened in December 1972; the third 4 km-long section between Eastern Creek and Prospect opened in April 1974. On the basis of a pre-election promise made by the NSW Premier Neville Wran in 1976, all land reserved for the expressway between Pyrmont and the (then) eastern termination point at Strathfield was sold off to property developers or declassified as a freeway corridor in 1977 by the State Government. Separate sections of Western Freeway, from Great Western Highway in Mays Hill to Church Street and Woodville Road in Parramatta, and from Auburn to Great Western Highway at Strathfield, were opened on 16 December 1982 by Premier Wran. In September 1984, a 2.1 km section of freeway opened to traffic, extending the freeway west from Auburn to James Ruse Drive in Granville. The 1.8 km Granville Viaduct project opened to traffic in April 1986, the elevated section finally connecting the Granville end to the next section at Parramatta and allowing both Granville and Parramatta to be properly bypassed. As part of this project, ramps to and from the north side of James Ruse Drive were opened to traffic in August 1987.

=== Western Motorway ===
A lack of funding resulted in the Wran Labor government halting plans to construct the final stage of the freeway between Mays Hill and Prospect in 1985. In December 1989 work to construct this stage began as a Build-Own-Operate-Transfer project. In return for funding construction StateWide Roads, the consortium awarded to build the stage, was given permission to toll the section between James Ruse Drive and Silverwater Road as traffic volumes on this section were significantly higher than between Mays Hill-Prospect and would allow a shorter toll period with lower tolls. The consortium would also widen the section between James Ruse Drive and the newly constructed Homebush Bay Drive to six lanes. The Mays Hill to Prospect section opened in May 1992 and an initial of a $1.50 toll was implemented; as a consequence of the toll, the freeway also changed names to Western Motorway. The concession held by StateWide Roads ended on 15 February 2010, with operation of the motorway returned to the Roads & Traffic Authority and the toll removed. At the time, StateWide Roads was owned by Transurban (50.6%) and Utilities Trust of Australia (21.5%).

The motorway is mostly three or four lanes wide in either direction, and carries constant heavy traffic during daylight hours, seven days a week. Built as a four-lane motorway, it was widened to six lanes during 1998 to 2000, but this did little to ease the congestion.

Originally planned in the mid-1950s to start in the Sydney central business district, the eastern section was built only as far west as Pyrmont, as part of the North West Expressway (or F3), a freeway that would connect the Sydney and Newcastle central business districts; this section is now part of the Western Distributor. From there it was to have joined with the Western Expressway (the F4), and the Southern Expressway (the F6) in Glebe. The western end of Western Freeway was to be routed through the Mitchell's Pass area through to Blaxland, however due to protests and the fact that the historic Lennox Bridge was very close to the intended pathway, it was decided to terminate the road at Russell Street, Emu Plains until a solution could be later found. This would have bypassed the Lapstone Hill area and avoided the sharp bends as the road enters Glenbrook. In December 1989 the western extension of the freeway commenced construction, from Russell Street to Great Western Highway in the vicinity of Governors Drive in Lapstone, would bypass the narrow and winding section of Great Western Highway, including the historic Knapsack Bridge; in June 1993, this new section was opened to traffic.

The passing of the Main Roads Act of 1924 through the Parliament of New South Wales provided for the declaration of Main Roads, roads partially funded by the State government through the Main Roads Board (MRB). With the subsequent passing of the Main Roads (Amendment) Act of 1929 to provide for additional declarations of State Highways and Trunk Roads, the Department of Main Roads (having succeeded the MRB in 1932) declared Western Freeway as a motorway (under plan number 6004), on 9 February 1977, and was re-declared to cover each extension until it reached its eastern terminus in Concord; the tollway today still retains this declaration (under Tollway 6004).

In 2013 the state government announced the intention to implement a 'managed motorway' scheme on the M4 over the coming years to improve traffic flow. Mechanisms to be used include improved variable message signs, ramp metering signals, dynamic speed and incident management, and an upgrade of the emergency telephone system.

National Route 32 was allocated to Great Western Highway originally in 1955: as new sections of the freeway opened, National Route 32 was re-routed along these new sections; from 1974, sections of the highway formerly allocated National Route 32 were allocated State Route 44 instead. Freeway Routes were introduced in 1973, and Freeway Route F4 was allocated to all existing sections, and extended along with National Route 32 each time a new section was opened. In 1992, at the same time the freeway was renamed, Metroad 4 replaced both National Route 32 and Freeway Route F4 across the entire freeway from Emu Plains to North Strathfield. With the conversion to the newer alphanumeric system in 2013, Metroad 4 was replaced with route M4.

The section between Church Street in Parramatta and the eastern end at Concord was widened as part of WestConnex works. Construction commenced in March 2015 and in November 2015, it was announced that toll points would be reinstated on this section from 2017 to cover costs of the WestConnex project. The toll was introduced on 15 August 2017.

=== M4 East ===
WestConnex M4 East Tunnel
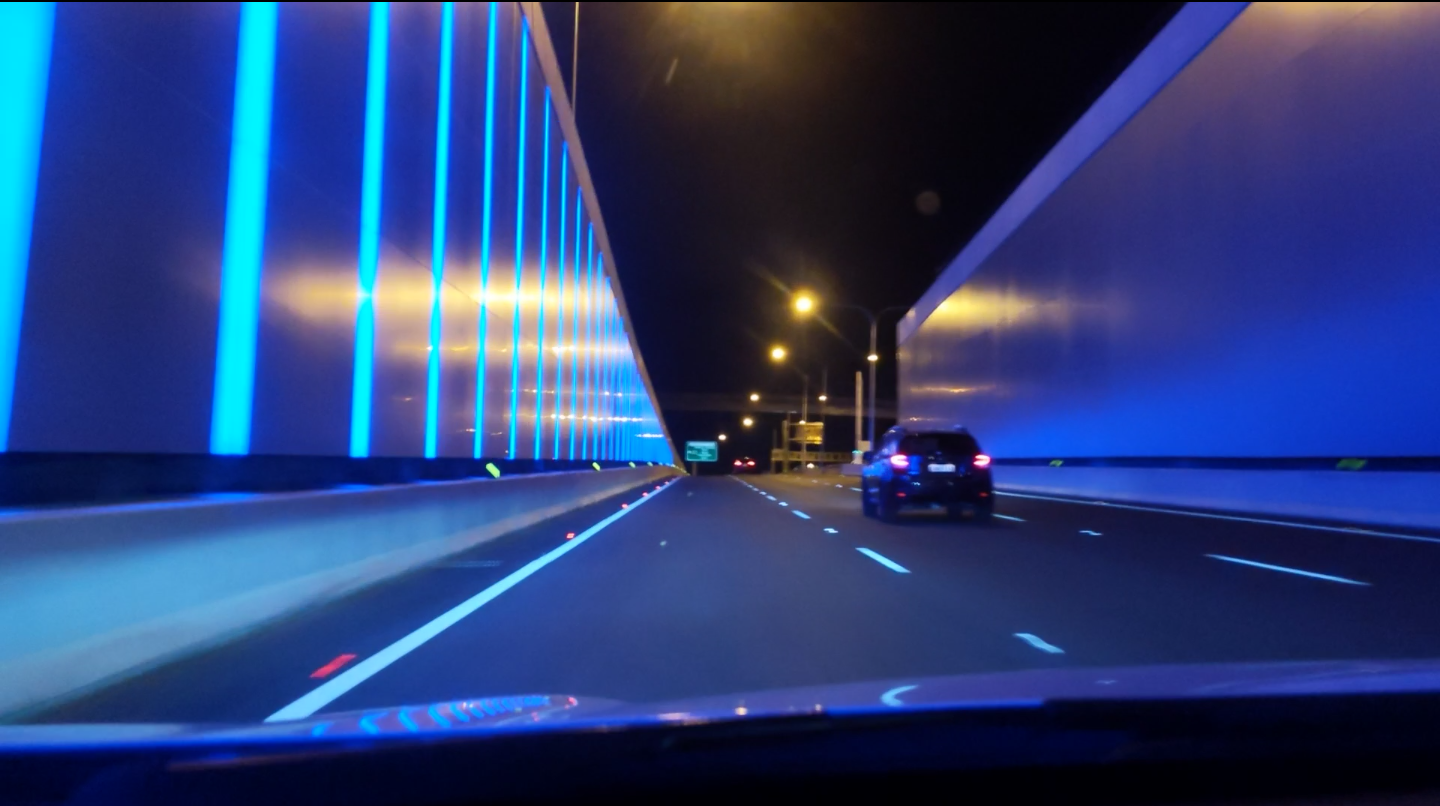
- WestConnex M4 Tunnel western exit at Homebush

Overview
- Route: M4 Motorway
- Start: Haberfield (east)
- End: Homebush (west)

Operation
- Work began: 2015
- Constructed: Leighton Contractors; Samsung; John Holland Group
- Opened: 13 July 2019
- Owner: WestConnex
- Operator: Sydney Motorway Corporation
- Toll: $4.41 (2020 dollars, subject to indexing, each way)

Technical
- Length: 5.6 kilometres (3.5 mi)
- No. of lanes: 3 in each direction
- Operating speed: 90 kilometres per hour (56 mph) (variable speed limit)

Until 2019 the eastern end of the M4 was at North Strathfield, some 15 kilometres (9.3 mi) from the Sydney central business district. Over the years a number of proposals were made to extend the M4 east towards the city. One plan in the 1990s involved extending the M4 eastwards by approximately 5 kilometres (3.1 mi) so that it would subsequently end in Ashfield and be continuous with the City West Link. Further planned upgrades to the City West Link would mean commuters going west out of the city could get to Parramatta without passing through traffic lights.

The government proposed a subsequent $7 billion plan for M4 East in July 2002, including three options:

- short tunnel option: a 3.6-kilometre (2.2 mi) tunnel between the M4 at Concord and City West Link and Parramatta Road at Haberfield
- long tunnel option: a 6.5-kilometre (4.0 mi) tunnel between the M4 at Concord and City West Link at Lilyfield
- slot option: a sunken trench road similar to the Eastern Distributor, between the M4 at Concord and Parramatta Road at Haberfield

All three options would run below or parallel to Parramatta Road and/or City West Link. The short tunnel option was preferred for having lower costs both during construction and operation. The long tunnel option was considered to have the potential to increase congestion on the approaches to Anzac Bridge, causing eastbound queues to extend into the tunnels. The slot option could be constructed at a similar cost to the short tunnel, however, it was considered to not provide the same level of traffic benefits as the short tunnel option. Additionally, the option would need to acquire additional properties and the construction period for this option would be longer.

Between 2003 and 2004 the preferred short tunnel option for an eastern extension of the M4 Motorway was exhibited. Members of the government were divided over the M4 East proposal and ultimately did not proceed with it in early 2005 due to community opposition. The preferred option eventually formed the basis of the concept design for the M4 East project of the WestConnex.

In the month before the 2011 state election the NRMA released a report in which it recommended building a tunnel to connect the end of the M4 at Concord and the start of the City West Link, relieving Parramatta Road of enough traffic to convert it into two lanes for slower-moving local traffic, two lanes of light rail and a cycleway. The report argued that this would allow Parramatta Road to be transformed with medium-density housing, shops and cafes and that the $10.04 billion in additional stamp duty and other revenues from this would pay for the $7.38 billion price tag of the project.

In October 2012 the NSW government announced their commitment to deliver the WestConnex project, involving widening the existing M4 Motorway as well as extending it east with a tunnel from North Strathfield to Taverners Hill. The project also involved duplicating the M5 East tunnel and building a new tunnel linking the M4 and M5 motorways.

In June 2015 the tender to design and build the WestConnex M4 Tunnel was awarded to Leighton Contractors, Samsung and John Holland. Located 35 metres (115 ft) beneath Parramatta Road, the 5.5-kilometre (3 mi) dual-tunnel was funded through a $1.8 billion grant from the NSW Government and, from the Australian Government, a $1.5 billion grant and concessional loan of up to $2 billion, plus user tolling. The M4 East opened to traffic on 13 July 2019 and tolls were levied on both the M4 East Tunnel ($4.41 in 2020, comprising a flagfall and a change per distance travelled, subject to indexing) and the widening of the M4 between Parramatta and Homebush (base of $4.21 each way, subject to indexing). Both tolls will continue until 2060.

=== M4 and M8 extensions ===
Stage 3 of the WestConnex scheme saw a new motorway connection running from the end of the M4 at Haberfield to connect with the airport and the M8 Motorway (formerly the New M5) at St Peters, along with an interchange at Rozelle linking to the Anzac Bridge and Victoria Road (Iron Cove Bridge). This section aimed to reduce travel times between Western Sydney and Port Botany while removing heavy vehicles from surface streets in the Inner West.

In September 2022 the government announced that the connection would be referred to as extensions of the M4 and M8 when the connection opened. The main tunnels between WestConnex M4 Tunnels at Haberfield and the M8 Tunnels at St Peters opened on 20 January 2023, with the M4 and M8 route markers extended to meet at Leichhardt until Rozelle Interchange opened. The interchange opened on 26 November 2023 and the M4 route marker was further extended to Rozelle and Anzac Bridge where the route transitions into A4.

=== M4 Smart Motorway project ===
In July 2019 the NSW government announced its M4 Smart Motorway project which involves widening the on and off ramps for the untolled section of the motorway between Lapstone and Mays Hill, including the installation of overhead gantries with variable speed limit displays and traffic signals on the on-ramps between Orchard Hills and Mays Hill for traffic metering during peak periods.

== Toll ==
The section of the M4 between Church Street, Parramatta and Haberfield are tolled by distance travelled as part of WestConnex. Toll points are located at entrances and exits along this section. The toll charge consists of:

- a flagfall
- a charge per kilometre

Tolls for heavy vehicles are triple of cars and motorcycles. Toll prices increase by 4% or the consumer price index (CPI) every year, whichever is greater, until 2040, after which CPI will apply.

Toll prices as of 1 July 2025
Toll road	Class A toll prices (Note: Class A vehicles are typically cars and motorcycles; Class B vehicles are all other vehicles including trucks and heavy vehicles)			Class B toll prices	Toll increase	Toll concessionaire	Expiry of toll concession
Toll road	Flagfall	Charge per km	Toll cap	Class B toll prices	Toll increase	Toll concessionaire	Expiry of toll concession
WestConnex (M4, M5 East, M8)	$1.73	$0.6411	$12.25	3 x of Class A prices	Annually on 1 January, by the greater of CPI or 4% until December 2040, and then by positive CPI only	Sydney Transport Partners (9% Tawreed Investments 10.5% CPPIB, 10% Caisse de dépôt et placement du Québec (CDPQ), 20.5% Australian Super, 50% Transurban)	2060

A toll point was previously introduced between James Ruse Drive and Silverwater Road in both directions until the toll was removed on 16 February 2010, when the M4 ownership was returned to the state government.

== Exits and interchanges ==
LGA	Location	km	mi	Destinations	Notes
Blue Mountains	Glenbrook	0	0.0	Great Western Highway (A32) – Katoomba, Lithgow, Bathurst	Western terminus of motorway and route M4; Road continues as Great Western Highway
Blue Mountains–Penrith boundary	Glenbrook–Emu Plains–Leonay tripoint	0.6	0.37	Blue Mountains railway line	
Penrith	Emu Plains–Leonay boundary	1.7	1.1	Russell Street (A44) – Emu Plains, Penrith	Offset dumbbell interchange
Nepean River		2.6	1.6	Regentville Bridge	
Penrith	Jamisontown–Regentville boundary	4.0	2.5	Mulgoa Road – Mulgoa, Penrith	Diamond interchange
Penrith	Glenmore Park–South Penrith–Orchard Hills tripoint	7.5	4.7	The Northern Road (A9) – Windsor, Narellan, Nepean Hospital	Single-point urban interchange
Penrith	Orchard Hills–Claremont Meadows boundary	12.7	7.9	Kent Road – Orchard Hills, Werrington	Half-diamond interchange, eastbound entrance and westbound exit only
South Creek		13.2	8.2	Bridge over the river (no known name)	
Penrith	Orchard Hills–St Clair–St Marys tripoint	13.7	8.5	Mamre Road – St Marys, Badgerys Creek	Partial cloverleaf interchange
Penrith	Erskine Park–Colyton boundary	17.2	10.7	Roper Road (north) – Mt Druitt, Lethbridge Park; Erskine Park Road (south) – Erskine Park	Partial cloverleaf interchange, eastbound and westbound entrance, westbound exit only
Blacktown	Eastern Creek–Minchinbury boundary	21.6	13.4	Wallgrove Road – Horsley Park, Rooty Hill	Diamond interchange
Blacktown	Eastern Creek–Minchinbury boundary	21.6	13.4	Westlink M7 (M7) – Dean Park, Bella Vista, Prestons, Sydney Airport (via M5)	Light Horse Interchange: modified four-level stack interchange; tolled entrance to and exit from M7
Blacktown	Huntingwood–Blacktown–Prospect tripoint	25.5	15.8	Reservoir Road – Pemulwuy, Blacktown, Sydney Motorsport Park, Prospect Reservoir	Partial diamond and partial cloverleaf interchange
Blacktown	Prospect	27.4	17.0	Prospect Highway – Pemulwuy, Prospect, Wet'n'Wild, Prospect Reservoir	Diamond interchange
Parramatta	Greystanes–South Wentworthville boundary	32.0	19.9	Cumberland Highway (A28) – Wahroonga, Pennant Hills, Liverpool, Westmead and Children's hospitals	Diamond interchange
Parramatta	South Wentworthville–Merrylands boundary	33.7	20.9	Great Western Highway (A44) – Wentworthville, Westmead, Parramatta; Coleman Street – Westmead, Merrylands, Westmead and Children's hospitals	Eastbound entrance ramp from Great Western Highway; Westbound exit via Coleman Street
Parramatta	Merrylands	34.6	21.5	Burnett Street – Merrylands, Parramatta	Eastbound entrance and westbound exit only
Parramatta	Holroyd	35.9	22.3	Western boundary of toll road	
Parramatta	Holroyd–Granville boundary	36.2	22.5	Church Street (Great Western Highway) (A44 north) – Parramatta; Parramatta Road (Great Western Highway) (A44 east) – Granville, Strathfield; Woodville Road (south) Villawood	Eastbound exit and westbound entrance only No right turn from Church Street into westbound entrance ramp
Parramatta	Clyde	37.7	23.4	James Ruse Drive (north) – Rose Hill, North Parramatta, Northmead	Eastbound exit to the north only, westbound entrance from the north only
Parramatta	Clyde	37.8	23.5	James Ruse Drive – Rose Hill, North Parramatta, Northmead, to Great Western Highway	Eastbound entrance and westbound exit only
Duck River		38.8	24.1	Bridge over the river (no known name)	
Cumberland	Auburn–Lidcombe boundary	40.4	25.1	Silverwater Road (A6) – Bankstown, Heathcote, Silverwater, Carlingford	Diamond interchange
Haslams Creek		41.2	25.6	Bridge over the river (no known name)	
Cumberland	Lidcombe	41.6	25.8	Hill Road – Lidcombe, Wentworth Point, Sydney Olympic Park	Eastbound exit to the north, eastbound and westbound entrances from the north only
Cumberland	Homebush West	43.3	26.9	Homebush Bay Drive (A3 north) – Ryde, Mona Vale, Sydney Olympic Park; Centenary Drive (A3 south) – Homebush West, Beverley Hills, Blakehurst	Offset diamond interchange hybrid; westbound entrance from the north is via a loop
Strathfield	Homebush	44.0	27.3	M4 Western Motorway eastern terminus; M4 East Motorway western terminus	M4 East Motorway Tunnel entrance/exit
Strathfield	Homebush	45.0	28.0	Parramatta Road (Great Western Highway) (A44) – Homebush	Westbound entrance only
Powells Creek		45.1	28.0	Tunnel under creek, bridge over the creek (no known name)	
Canada Bay	North Strathfield	45.5	28.3	Sydney Street (to Concord Road) – North Strathfield, Strathfield, Concord	Surface entrance and exit: Eastbound exit to the north and south, westbound entrance from the north only
Canada Bay	North Strathfield	45.5	28.3	Concord Road – North Strathfield, Strathfield, Concord	Tunnel entrance and exit: Eastbound entrance and westbound exit only
Canada Bay	North Strathfield–Concord boundary	45.9	28.5	Parramatta Road (Great Western Highway) (A44) – Burwood, Five Dock	Westbound entrance from and eastbound exit to east only Eastern terminus of surface-level roadway
Iron Cove Creek		48.9	30.4	Tunnel under the creek	
Inner West	Haberfield	49.3	30.6	M4 East Motorway eastern terminus; M4–M8 link western terminus	
Inner West	Haberfield	49.3	30.6	Wattle Street (A44) – Haberfield, Rozelle, Sydney	Westbound entrance from and eastbound exit to the north only Eastbound entrance from and westbound exit to the south only
Inner West	Haberfield–Ashfield boundary	49.6	30.8	Parramatta Road (Great Western Highway) (A22) – Leichhardt, Haymarket	Westbound entrance from and eastbound exit to the east only
Hawthorne Canal		51.2	31.8	Tunnel under the canal	
Inner West	Leichhardt	52.1	32.4	M8 Motorway (M8) – St Peters, Sydney Airport	M4–M8 link continues along the M8 motorway Rozelle Interchange western terminus
Inner West	Lilyfield	53.1	33.0	Eastern boundary of toll road	
Inner West	Lilyfield	53.1	33.0	Western Harbour Tunnel – North Sydney, Warringah Freeway	Under construction Westbound entrance and eastbound exit only
Inner West	Rozelle	54.2	33.7	Iron Cove Link, to Victoria Road (A40) – Lane Cove, Ryde	Eastbound entrance and westbound exit only
Inner West	Rozelle	54.4	33.8	Rozelle Interchange eastern terminus	Tunnel entrance/exit
Inner West	Rozelle	54.8	34.1	Western Distributor (A4) – Sydney, Anzac Bridge	Eastern terminus of motorway and route M4, continues west as route A4 along Western Distributor
1.000 mi = 1.609 km; 1.000 km = 0.621 mi: Incomplete access; Tolled; Route transition; Unopened

== See also ==
- Freeways in Australia
- Freeways in Sydney
- Metroad 4
