= NorthConnex =

Motorway in Sydney, New South Wales, Australia

NorthConnex New South Wales

- Coordinates: 33.711647°S 151.115585°E (Northeast end); 33.758945°S 151.046407°E (Southwest end)

General information
- Type: Motorway
- Length: 8.9 km (5.5 mi)
- Opened: 31 October 2020
- Route number(s): M11 (2023–present)

Major junctions
- Northeast end: Pacific Motorway; Wahroonga, Sydney
- Pennant Hills Road
- Southwest end: M2 Hills Motorway; West Pennant Hills, Sydney

Location(s)
- Major suburbs / towns: Normanhurst, Thornleigh, Pennant Hills

Highway system
- Highways in Australia; National Highway • Freeways in Australia; Highways in New South Wales

NorthConnex is a 9-kilometre (5.6 mi) twin-tube motorway tunnel in northern Sydney, New South Wales, Australia, signposted as the M11 Tunnel. It acts as a tunnel bypass of the congested Pennant Hills Road, extending or connecting the M1 Pacific Motorway to the M2 Hills Motorway. Owned by NorthWestern Roads (NWR) Group, it is one of the longest road tunnels in Australia, along with the WestConnex Tunnel. It is also the deepest road tunnel in Australia, with more than half of the tunnel 60 metres (200 ft) deep or more, and the deepest point is underneath the Sydney Metro Northwest, about 90 metres (300 ft) below ground.

NorthConnex was first known as the F3 to M2 link, with F3 referring to the F3 Sydney–Newcastle Freeway, the previous name of the M1 Pacific Motorway. It was then renamed the M1 to M2 link in 2013 when the F3 was renamed the M1 Pacific Motorway. The NorthConnex name was announced in March 2014. In 2023, the motorway, which was previously not part of a road route, was assigned the route number M11.

== Design ==
NorthConnex is a tolled motorway tunnel linking M1 Pacific Motorway at Wahroonga to M2 Hills Motorway at West Pennant Hills. NorthConnex is integrated within the existing Sydney Orbital Network and the need for integration work at either end has been identified to enable the safe merge of traffic on and off the M1 and M2, optimising motorway performance. The northern and southern interchanges were constructed to accommodate connections to Pennant Hills Road at either end of the tunnel.

The tunnel allows motorists to bypass 21 sets of traffic lights along Pennant Hills Road, meaning drivers will not encounter a single traffic light when travelling the 1000 km between Melbourne and Newcastle. NorthConnex also forms an alternative route between the Pacific Motorway and the Sydney CBD via the M2 and Lane Cove Tunnel, bypassing 40 traffic lights along the Pacific Highway.

The road has also colloquially been referred to as the "missing link", because its construction completed the combination of the Sydney Orbital Network and its north–south motorway links to the National Highway.

=== Features ===
The northbound tunnel contains backlit silhouettes of native birds and trees such as eagles, cockatoos, galahs, and lorikeets, an attempt to reflect the journey to Ku-ring-gai Chase National Park. The southbound tunnel contains fake starry skies displayed on the tunnel ceilings to represent the transition from the north's rural environment to the CBD's urban environment. The visual displays were designed to be eye-catching to keep drivers focused while driving through the 9-kilometre tunnel. The idea was inspired from the Norra länken tunnels in Stockholm which feature illuminated butterflies.

NorthConnex is longer than the Lane Cove Tunnel, Cross City Tunnel and the Sydney Harbour Tunnel combined.

== History ==
=== Past proposals ===
M1 Pacific Motorway, then known as F3 Sydney–Newcastle Freeway, was originally planned in the early 1960s to continue as the Lane Cove Valley Expressway, which was to join the North Western Expressway, leading to the Sydney Central Business District via Gladesville Bridge and the Western Distributor, but those plans were cancelled in 1977. The F3 Freeway was extended to Wahroonga in 1989, but there was no plan for a motorway route continuing beyond that location at the time. However, the corridor of land to link the F3 and the M2 via the Lane Cove Valley was reserved for road use since 1988. It was abandoned by the state government in 1996, but was retained as open space.

In 2001, at the same time as announcing Western Sydney Orbital (now Westlink M7), the federal Coalition government proposed that the Orbital would form part of a bypass route, with a new road branching off the F3 near Mount White and crossing the Hawkesbury River with a new high-level bridge to join the Orbital at its distinct northwestern corner at Dean Park. Hence, the road would avoid the steep grades of the Mount White section of the F3 immediately north of the existing low-level bridges across the Hawkesbury River and would be a quite direct bypass of Sydney that would be separated from much of Sydney's commuter traffic.

A study was undertaken by Sinclair Knight Merz (SKM) into options for connecting the F3 with the Sydney Orbital. At the preliminary stage of that study, the then Roads and Traffic Authority decided that the primary goal of the new road was the best possible relief of traffic on the existing route, Pennant Hills Road. Corridors for that proposal were broadly defined as types A, B and C.

- Type A options were essentially from the existing end of the F3 to somewhere on the M2
- Type B corridors branched off the F3 in the vicinity of Berowra and crossed the environmentally sensitive Galston Gorge
- Type C corridors were along the general lines of the Federal Government proposal (F3 to Western Sydney Orbital)

The need to reduce traffic on Pennant Hills Road made the reduction of commuter traffic more urgent than that of traffic bypassing Sydney. As such, type B and C options were rejected early in the planning process. Four type A options were identified and all involved extensive tunnelling.

The four type A options were put to public in 2003, and were denoted by colours:

- 'Purple' option: from the F3 at Wahroonga to the M2 at the existing Pennant Hills Road/M2 interchange, generally following the alignment of Pennant Hills Road. It will consist of mostly tunnels with an open cut adjacent to the railway corridor and in the vicinity of Brickyard Park at Thornleigh.
- 'Blue' option: 8 kilometres (5.0 mi) dual tunnels from the F3 at Wahroonga to the M2 at the existing Pennant Hills Road/M2 interchange, generally following an alignment to the east Pennant Hills Road
- 'Yellow' option: 6.5 kilometres (4.0 mi) dual tunnels from the F3 at Wahroonga to the M2 at North Epping, with direct connections to the east and west at M2
- 'Red' option: 6.5 kilometres (4.0 mi) dual tunnels from the F3 at Wahroonga to the M2 at Macquarie Park, with direct connections to the east and west at M2. This followed the alignment of the cancelled Lane Cove Valley Expressway

The study report by SKM was released in April 2004. On 6 May 2004, the Deputy Prime Minister and federal Minister for Transport and Regional Services, John Anderson, and the federal Minister for Local Government, Territories and Roads, Senator Ian Campbell, announced that a preferred corridor had been chosen for a new link to be constructed from the F3 Freeway to the Sydney Orbital. The preferred corridor was the 'Purple' option, which was 8 kilometres (5.0 mi) long, mostly in tunnel, and would connect the F3 Freeway at Wahroonga to the M2 Motorway at Pennant Hills Road interchange. The federal government strongly preferred that the corridor be fully tunneled which would ensure that there would no opening in Brickyard Park. The corridor was also the most favoured by the public in submissions.

On 19 February 2007, the federal Minister for Local Government, Territories and Roads Jim Lloyd announced the establishment of an independent review of the F3 to M7 Corridor Selection. The review was carried out by Mahla Pearlman AO, who is a former Chief Judge of the NSW Land and Environment Court. The review was completed in August 2007 and the report was released on 14 September 2007. The conclusions of the report were that the proposed tunnels should proceed but that planning for the longer term connection between the F3 and the M7 should also commence immediately.

In the 2007 federal election, both major parties made different election commitments regarding the F3 to M2 link. Labor committed $150 million to undertake feasibility and planning studies under the National Building Program, while the Coalition made election commitment of $1.5 billion over seven years to 2014 to fund the construction of the F3 to M2 corridor. Labor eventually won the election. In October 2008, the NSW government sought to receive federal funding from Infrastructure Australia on the F3-M2 connector. In May 2011, the federal Labor government announced deferral of its National Building Program feasibility study until 2015–16, creating uncertainty about the federal government's commitment to the project.

=== Project revival ===
==== Pennant Hills Road ====
In March 2011, the Liberals–Nationals coalition won the state election. In 2012, Infrastructure NSW released its 20-year State Infrastructure Strategy report which claimed that Pennant Hills Road carried approximately 80,000 vehicles per day in 2011. The Environmental Impact Statement of the NorthConnex subsequently released in July 2014 showed that Pennant Hills Road carried approximately 62,000 vehicles per day, out of which roughly 10% were heavy vehicles. Until 2020, the average daily traffic volumes on Pennant Hills Road remained at the same numbers.

Along with the State Infrastructure Strategy report, the link between the F3 and M2 was also recognised in Transport for NSW's Long Term Transport Master Plan as "important infrastructure for freight traffic and the wider connectivity within NSW to reduce congestion and improve traffic flow along Pennant Hills Road."

In 2013, The National Roads and Motorists' Association (NRMA) identified the arterial, Pennant Hills Road as the third worst road in NSW and the ACT. This rating reflected the level of frustration experienced by road users. Traffic congestion is often associated with poor road safety and further compounding congestion into the off-peak period. The rate of accidents along the arterial strip was significantly higher when compared to the NSW average.

A proposed tunnel link was estimated to carry more than 100,000 vehicles per day (50,000 in each direction).

==== M7 owners proposal ====
In March 2012, the NSW government received an unsolicited proposal from the owners of M7, to design, build, operate, maintain and finance the F3–M2 Link. A committee was set up to investigate and assess the proposal and in July that year, the proposal moved to Stage 2 of the unsolicited proposals process (development and assessment of a detailed proposal). On 30 May 2013, the NSW Government announced the proposal had progressed to Stage 3, which would include a competitive tender to select a design and construction contractor.

In mid-2013, the F3 became known as the M1 Pacific Motorway and the proposed tunnels became the M1–M2 link. On 16 March 2014, the NSW Government reached an agreement with the M7 owners (later known as NorthWestern Roads Group) to build, maintain and operate the tunnel link. It was also announced that the tunnel link would be known as NorthConnex.

==== Funding ====
The A$3 billion, consisting of a construction budget of A$2.65 billion in addition to land and project delivery costs, was funded through toll charges and a contribution from the NSW and Australian Governments of A$412.3 million each.

The toll concessions of Westlink M7 and Lane Cove Tunnel were extended from 2037 to June 2048 to fund the project. The toll concession of the M2 Hills Motorway was also extended from 2046 to June 2048 for the M2's integration works with NorthConnex.

==== Criticism ====
There was community opposition and criticism to a proposed ventilation exhaust to be built for the tunnels near schools in Sydney.

There is also some contention within the local community about how successful the chosen route option would be in easing traffic congestion on Pennant Hills Road. Ku-ring-gai Council has also raised a significant concern that the current proposal does not address the worsening traffic on the Pacific Highway from Wahroonga through to the Gore Hill Freeway at Artarmon. To help address this, construction of east-facing tunnel ramps under Pennant Hills Golf Course to the M2 Motorway may be considered in the future if required.

=== Construction ===
Along with the announcement of the NorthConnex name in March 2014, the Lendlease Bouygues joint venture was announced as the preferred construction contractor for the project.

Planning approval for the construction and operation of NorthConnex was granted on 13 January 2015 by the NSW Minister of Planning.

Preliminary work activities started on 5 February 2015 and continued until major construction began in mid-2015. Tunnelling began in April 2016 and finished in October/November 2018. In conjunction with Hornsby Shire Council, the spoil removed from NorthConnex tunnelling was used to fill Hornsby Quarry to enable rehabilitation of the old quarry into a new public parkland.

The project was originally due to be completed by the end of 2019 but was delayed with the contractor citing the depth of the tunnel (90m) as presenting challenges to the construction time frame. It was estimated to be open during the third quarter of 2020, but was further delayed due to the COVID-19 pandemic. The tunnel finally opened on 31 October 2020.

=== Post-opening ===
By August 2023, coverplates and new signage bearing the route number M11 began to be signposted on entry approaches to NorthConnex. This gave an indication that NorthConnex was to be allocated route M11, however, no official announcement was given at the time. The route allocation was officially announced by Transport for NSW in late September 2023, with NorthConnex remaining as an official name of the tunnel.

== Toll ==
=== Ownership ===
NorthConnex is owned by the NorthWestern Roads Group (NWR), consisting of Transurban (50%), Queensland Investment Corporation (25%) and CPP Investment Board (25%). NWR also owns Westlink M7.

The concession to operate and toll the NorthConnex expires in June 2048.

=== Pricing ===
Toll prices on NorthConnex are set to the maximum toll prices on M2 Hills Motorway. Toll prices on the M2 and NorthConnex would increase in line with the proposed concession agreement with the Government and will end in June 2048.

Despite the aligned NorthConnex and M2 toll prices, NorthConnex tolls do not cover travel on the M2 Motorway. This means that travelling on both the NorthConnex and M2 will incur two separate toll charges.

Toll prices as of 1 July 2025
Toll road	Class A toll prices (Note: Class A vehicles are typically cars and motorcycles; Class B vehicles are all other vehicles including trucks and heavy vehicles.)	Class B toll prices	Toll increase	Toll concessionaire	Expiry of toll concession
NorthConnex	$10.15	$30.45	Quarterly on 1 January, 1 April, 1 July, and 1 October, by the greater of quarterly CPI or 1%	NorthWestern Roads (NWR) Group (50% Transurban, 25% QIC, 25% CPP)	June 2048

=== Pennant Hills Road regulation ===
Since the opening of NorthConnex on 31 October 2020, all trucks and buses over 12.5 metres long or over 2.8 metres clearance height (except vehicles transporting dangerous goods, oversize vehicles, or that have a genuine destination only accessible via Pennant Hills Road) travelling between the M1 and M2 are forbidden to use Pennant Hills Road and must use the NorthConnex tunnels instead. Trucks and buses will be monitored by two gantries located along Pennant Hills Road, one at Normanhurst and one at Beecroft / West Pennant Hills. A fine of A$194 with no demerit points will also be imposed on truck and bus drivers detected (with the use of cameras mounted on gantries) using Pennant Hills Road with the traffic flow.

== Exits and interchanges ==
LGA	Location	km	mi	Destinations	Notes
Hornsby–Ku-ring-gai boundary	Wahroonga	0	0.0	M1 Pacific Motorway (M1 north) – Gosford, Newcastle, Port Macquarie, Coffs Harbour, Brisbane	Northern terminus of NorthConnex, continues north as Pacific Motorway
Hornsby–Ku-ring-gai boundary	Wahroonga	0	0.0	Northern terminus of tunnel and toll	
Hornsby–Ku-ring-gai boundary	Wahroonga	1.1	0.68	Pennant Hills Road (Cumberland Highway) (A28) – Wahroonga, Pennant Hills to Pacific Highway (A1 southeast, B83 north) – Hornsby, Chatswood	Southbound entrance and northbound exit only
The Hills–Hornsby boundary	West Pennant Hills–Beecroft boundary	8.5	5.3	Pennant Hills Road (Cumberland Highway) (A28 south) – Carlingford, Parramatta, City to M2 Hills Motorway (M2 east) – Macquarie Park, North Sydney	Northbound entrance and southbound exit only
The Hills–Parramatta boundary	West Pennant Hills–Carlingford boundary	8.9	5.5	Southern terminus of tunnel and toll	
The Hills–Parramatta boundary	West Pennant Hills–Carlingford boundary	8.9	5.5	M2 Hills Motorway (M2 west) – Seven Hills, Blacktown, Campbelltown, Canberra, Melbourne	Southern terminus of NorthConnex, continues west as M2 Hills Motorway
1.000 mi = 1.609 km; 1.000 km = 0.621 mi: Incomplete access; Tolled; Route transition

== See also ==
- Transport in Sydney in the 2010s
- WestConnex
