= James Ruse Drive =

Road in Sydney, New South Wales, Australia

James Ruse Drive New South Wales
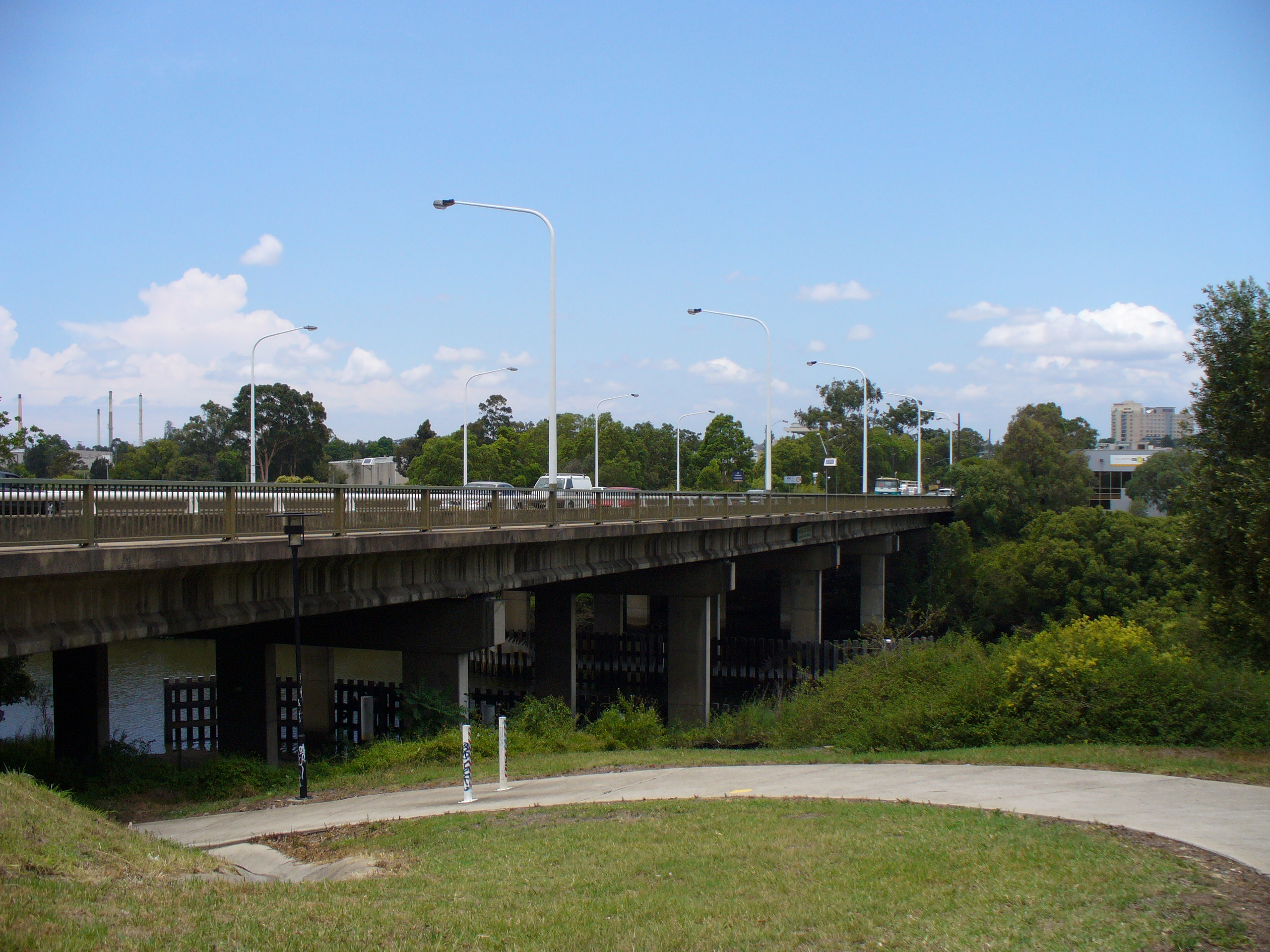
- James Ruse Drive Bridge over the Parramatta River
- Coordinates: 33°50′00″S 151°01′07″E (Southeast end); 33°47′30″S 150°59′53″E (Northwest end)

General information
- Type: Highway
- Length: 6.4 km (4.0 mi)
- Opened: June 1977 (First section); May 1984 (Last section)
- Gazetted: August 1928 (as Main Road 309); August 1988 (as State Highway 13, Cumberland Highway)
- Route number(s): A40 (2013–present) (Parramatta–Northmead); Concurrency: Cumberland Highway (North Parramatta–Northmead)
- Former route number: see Former route allocations

Major junctions
- Southeast end: Parramatta Road; Clyde, Sydney
- Western Motorway; Victoria Road; Windsor Road; Pennant Hills Road
- Northwest end: Briens Road; Northmead, Sydney

Location(s)
- Major settlements: Rosehill, Parramatta, North Parramatta

Highway system
- Highways in Australia; National Highway • Freeways in Australia; Highways in New South Wales

James Ruse Drive is a 6.4-kilometre-long (4.0 mi) limited-access urban highway located to the east and north of Parramatta, in Western Sydney, New South Wales, Australia. Originally a series of disconnected urban streets, it was later upgraded to act as a bypass of central Parramatta.

== Route ==
James Ruse Drive commences at the intersection with Parramatta Road in Clyde and heads as in a northerly direction as a dual-carriageway, 6-lane highway, crossing under M4 Motorway and then nearly immediately over the Parramatta Light Rail. It then crosses over the Parramatta River, through an interchange with Victoria Road and another interchange with Kissing Point Road and Pennant Street, where it narrows to a four-lane road, and continues in a north-westerly direction to the interchange with Pennant Hills Road, where it widens again to a six-lane road and becomes part of Cumberland Highway. It continues in a westerly direction to end at the interchange with Windsor Road in Northmead; the road continues west as Briens Road, part of Cumberland Highway.

== History ==
The road was named in honour of James Ruse, a convict who was given land in the Parramatta district, which he successfully developed into the colony's first sustainable farm. The original Experiment Farm Cottage still exists on Ruse Street, Parramatta.

In the early 20th century, only suburban streets existed along today's route. Starting at Parramatta Road, it headed north as Berry Street, crossed the Carlingford railway line and changed name to Aston Street, and continued north until reaching the Parramatta River. On the other side, Rydalmere Avenue headed north until terminating at Kissing Point Road.

The passing of the Main Roads Act of 1924 through the Parliament of New South Wales provided for the declaration of Main Roads, roads partially funded by the State government through the Main Roads Board (MRB). Main Road No. 309 was declared on 8 August 1928, from the intersection with Parramatta Road in Clyde along Berry and Aston Streets until it reached the Carlingford railway line; with the passing of the Main Roads (Amendment) Act of 1929 to provide for additional declarations of State Highways and Trunk Roads, this was amended to Main Road 309 on 8 April 1929.

A pre-stressed concrete bridge was built over the Parramatta River to link Aston Street and Rydalmere Avenue, completed in 1966. Main Road 309 was extended north along the full length of Aston Street over the new bridge and along Rydalmere Avenue to end at Kissing Point Road on 22 February 1967.

The Parramatta Bypass project was constructed in stages. The first 1.5 kilometre section extending Rydalmere Avenue from Victoria Road to a new interchange with Pennant Hills Road opened on 6 June 1977. The next 1.6 kilometre section extending Rydalmere Avenue from Pennant Hills Road to a new interchange with Windsor Road opened on 10 September 1979. Stage 3 along Briens Road from Windsor Road to Kleins Road opened 19 September 1980, followed by Stage 4 along Briens Road to Old Windsor Road on 21 December 1980. The eastern half of the Parramatta Bypass (along Berry and Aston Streets, and Rydalmere Avenue and its new extensions to Windsor Road) was named as James Ruse Drive on 2 February 1981. The elimination of the railway crossing with an overpass where it crosses A'Becketts Creek was finished in May 1984.

With the declaration of Cumberland Highway on 26 August 1988, State Highway 13 was altered to use the new route from its northwestern end at the interchange with Windsor Road to the interchange with Pennant Hills Road at North Parramatta; the northern end of Main Road 309 was extended north along James Ruse Drive to meet State Highway 13 at the same interchange. In July 1994, as part of a grade separation project, a bridge was built over James Ruse Drive at Rydalmere to eliminate the intersection with Victoria Road.

The passing of the Roads Act of 1993 through the Parliament of New South Wales updated road classifications and the way they could be declared within New South Wales. Under this act, James Ruse Drive today retains its declaration as Highway 13 from the interchange with Windsor Road in Northmead to the interchange with Pennant Hills Road at North Parramatta, and as Main Road 309 from Pennant Hills Road to the intersection with Parramatta Road at Clyde.

It has been allocated several route numbers, as follows: State Route 53 (entire length from 1977–88), State Route 77 (as part of Cumberland Highway, 1988–93), State Route 55 (south of Cumberland Highway from 1988–2004), Metroad 7 (replaced State Route 77, from 1993–2005) and State Route 40 (north of Victoria Road 2007–13). With the conversion to the newer alphanumeric system in 2013, State Route 40 was replaced by route A40, and the sections gazetted as Cumberland Highway were also re-allocated as part of route A28.

=== Former route allocations ===
Clyde – Parramatta:

- State Route 53 (1977–1988)
- State Route 55 (1988–2004)
- unallocated (2007–present)

Parramatta – North Parramatta:

- State Route 53 (1977–1988)
- State Route 55 (1988–2004)
- unallocated (2004–2007)
- State Route 40 (2007–2013)
- A40 (2013–present)

North Parramatta – Northmead:

- State Route 53 (1979–1988)
- State Route 77 (1988–1993)
- Metroad 7 (1993–2005)
- unallocated (2005–2007)
- State Route 40 (2007–2013)
- A28 (2013–present)
- A40 (2013–present)

== Exits and interchanges ==
James Ruse Drive is entirely contained within the City of Parramatta local government area.

Location	km	mi	Destinations	Notes
Clyde	0	0.0	Parramatta Road (A44) – Granville, Merrylands, Auburn, Strathfield	Southeastern terminus of highway
Clyde	0.3	0.19	Western Motorway (M4) – Penrith, Homebush, Strathfield, Sydney CBD	Partial trumpet and partial diamond interchange No western entrance northbound, no eastern exit southbound
A'Becketts Creek	0.4	0.25	Bridge (no known official name)	
Rosehill	0.6	0.37	Parramatta Light Rail (former Carlingford railway line)	
Rosehill	1.6	0.99	Grand Avenue (east) – Camellia, Rosehill Racecourse; Hassall Street (west) – Harris Park	
Parramatta River	2.1	1.3	James Ruse Drive Bridge	
Parramatta	2.7	1.7	Victoria Road (A40 east, unallocated west) – Parramatta, Ryde, Drummoyne, Sydney CBD	Partial diamond interchange with partial cloverleaf Route A40 continues north along James Ruse Drive
Parramatta–North Parramatta boundary	3.3	2.1	Kissing Point Road (northeast) – Dundas; Pennant Street (southwest) – North Parramatta	Diamond interchange
North Parramatta–Oatlands boundary	4.8	3.0	Pennant Hills Road (Cumberland Highway) (A28 northeast, unallocated southwest) – North Parramatta, Carlingford, Wahroonga	Diamond interchange, southeastern terminus of concurrency with route A28
North Rocks–Northmead boundary	6.4	4.0	Windsor Road – Parramatta, Baulkham Hills, Windsor	Diamond interchange
North Rocks–Northmead boundary	6.4	4.0	Briens Road (Cumberland Highway) (A28/A40) – Wentworthville, Bella Vista, Windsor	Northwestern terminus of highway Routes A28 and A40 continue west along Briens Road
1.000 mi = 1.609 km; 1.000 km = 0.621 mi: Concurrency terminus; Incomplete access; Route transition

== See also ==
- Highways in New South Wales
