= Clyde, New South Wales =

Clyde
- Suburb
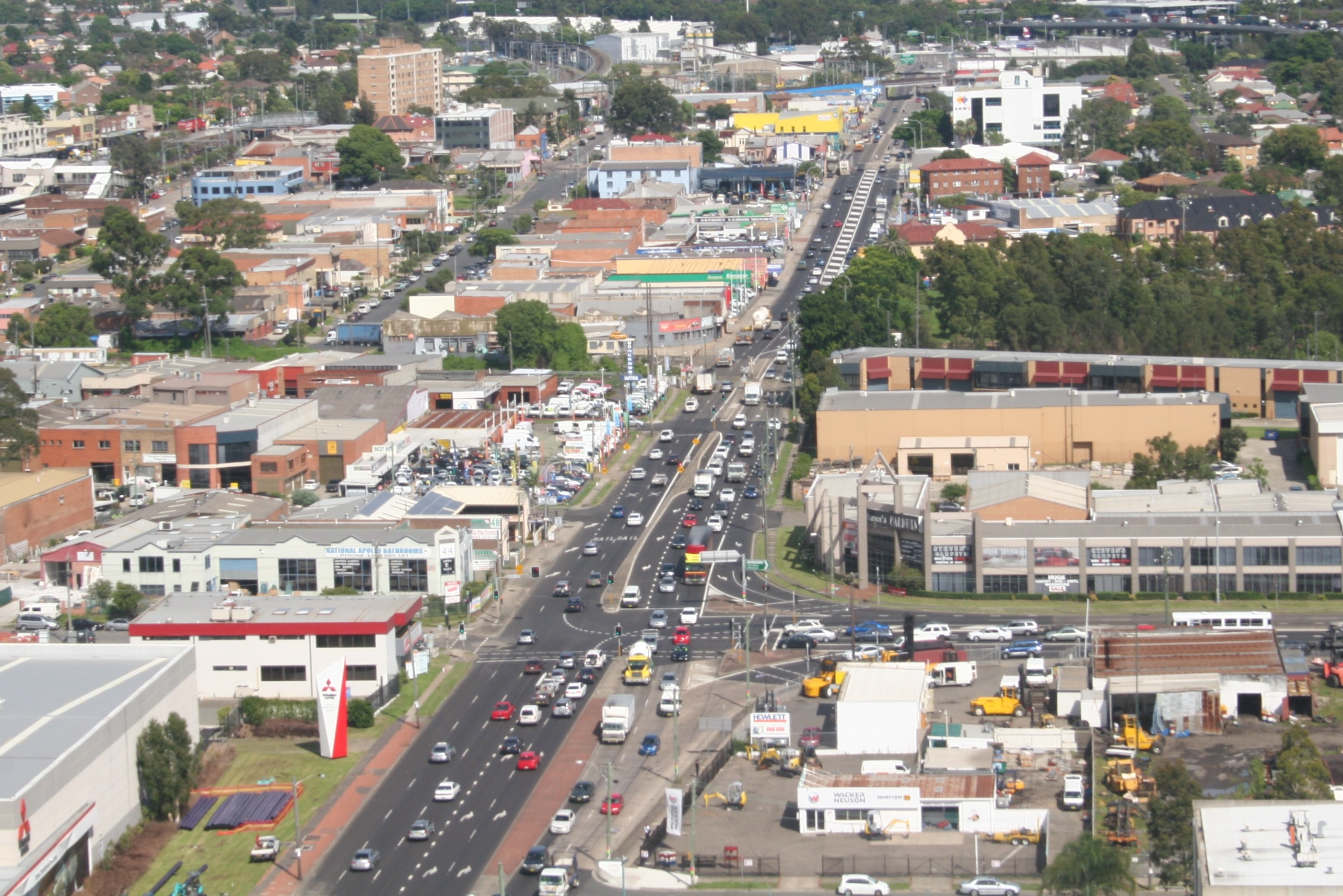
- Parramatta Road and James Ruse Drive

- Interactive map of Clyde
- Coordinates: 33°50′19″S 151°1′2″E
- Country: Australia
- State: New South Wales
- City: Sydney
- LGA: City of Parramatta
- Location: 21 km (13 mi) west of Sydney CBD

Government
  - State electorate: Granville
  - Federal divisions: Blaxland; Parramatta
- Elevation: 9 m (30 ft)

Population
  - Total: 9 (SAL 2021)
- Postcode: 2142
Suburbs around Clyde
Harris Park	Rosehill	Silverwater
Granville	Clyde	Auburn
Granville	Granville	Auburn

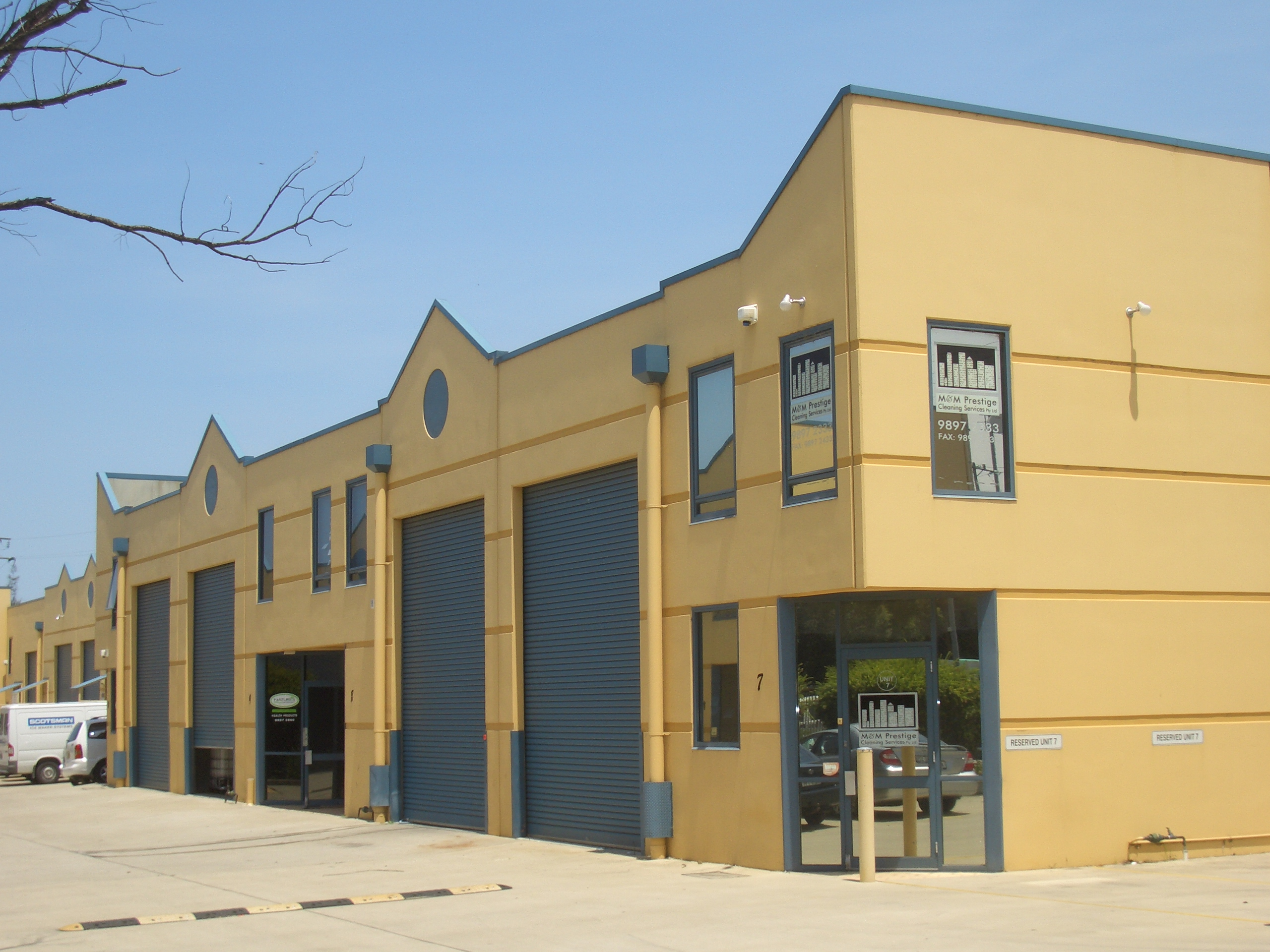
Duck Creek Estate

Clyde is a suburb of Sydney, in the state of New South Wales, Australia. Clyde is located 21 kilometres west of the Sydney central business district in the local government area of the City of Parramatta. Clyde is part of the Greater Western Sydney region.

== History ==
Clyde is named for the River Clyde in Scotland and was thought to be a suitable name because a subdivision of land made in 1878 here was called New Glasgow.

Rosehill Junction was the name of the railway station that opened here in 1882, just west of the bridge over the Duck River. It was a junction for the Western railway line with the Carlingford railway line and Sandown railway line. The Commissioner of Railways Edward Miller Grant Eddy renamed the station Clyde Junction.

== Commercial area ==
Clyde is exclusively an industrial and commercial area, featuring factories, workshops and warehouses. Clyde has no permanent population.

== Transport ==
Clyde railway station used to be a junction for the Western and Leppington & Inner West lines with the Carlingford line, of the Sydney Trains network before the Carlingford line closed in January 2020.

== Population ==
At the 2021 Australian census, there were nine people living in Clyde.

== See also ==
- Leightonfield
