= Camellia, New South Wales =

Suburb of Sydney, New South Wales, Australia

Camellia
- Suburb
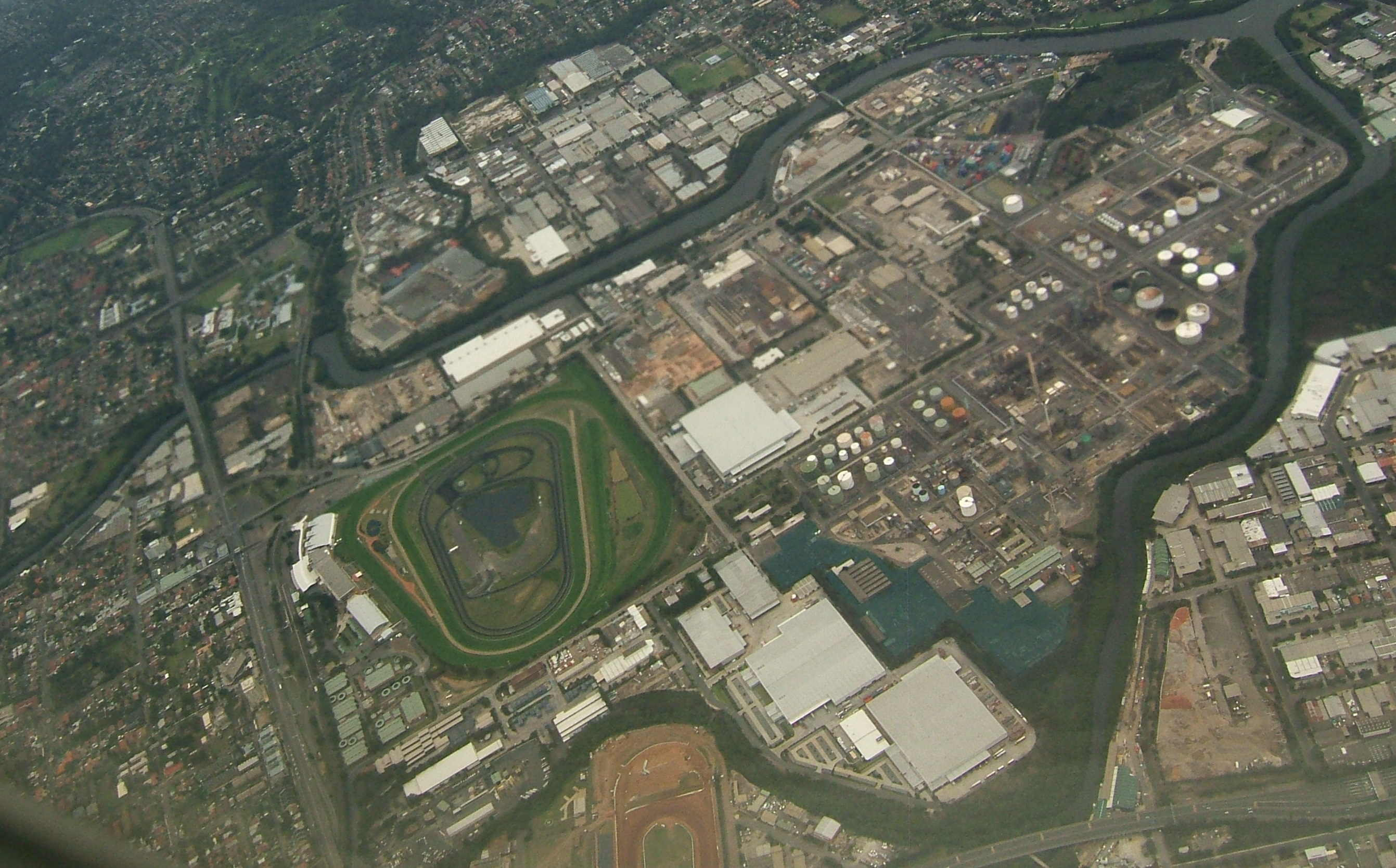
- Aerial view of Camellia

- Interactive map of Camellia
- Country: Australia
- State: New South Wales
- City: Sydney
- LGA: City of Parramatta
- Location: 17 km (11 mi) west of Sydney CBD

Government
  - State electorate: Parramatta
  - Federal division: Parramatta
- Elevation: 9 m (30 ft)

Population
  - Total: 0 (SAL 2021)
- Postcode: 2142
Suburbs around Camellia
Parramatta	Rydalmere	Rydalmere
Parramatta	Camellia	Silverwater
Harris Park	Rosehill	Silverwater

Camellia is a suburb of Sydney, in the state of New South Wales, Australia. Primarily industrial with no residential population, environmental remediation commenced in late 2015, with the suburb ear-marked as a major centre for future high density living.

Camellia is located 17 kilometres (11 mi) west of the Sydney central business district in the local government area of the City of Parramatta. The suburb is bounded by the Parramatta River to the north, Clay Cliff Creek to the west, Duck River to the east, and Grand Avenue. Major roads dissecting the suburb are Grand Avenue (east-west) and James Ruse Drive (north-south).

Camellia shares the postcode of 2142 with the separate suburbs of Granville, South Granville, Holroyd and Rosehill.

== History ==
The Burramattagal clan were the indigenous people who originally inhabited this area, relying on the fish, shellfish, bird life reptiles and marsupials that were once abundant in the waterways and forests adjoining the Parramatta River and the freshwaters of Clay Cliff Creek.

On 22 April 1788 Governor Arthur Phillip and his party of officers and marines journeyed inland by boat from Sydney Cove to find better farmlands for the new settlement. They landed at the head of a navigable river near what is now Clyde, which he called Duck River due to the abundance of ducks in the area. They left their boats to explore the area but could not penetrate the thick bush. The party moved to the banks of Clay Cliff Creek, where they decided to camp because of its fresh water.

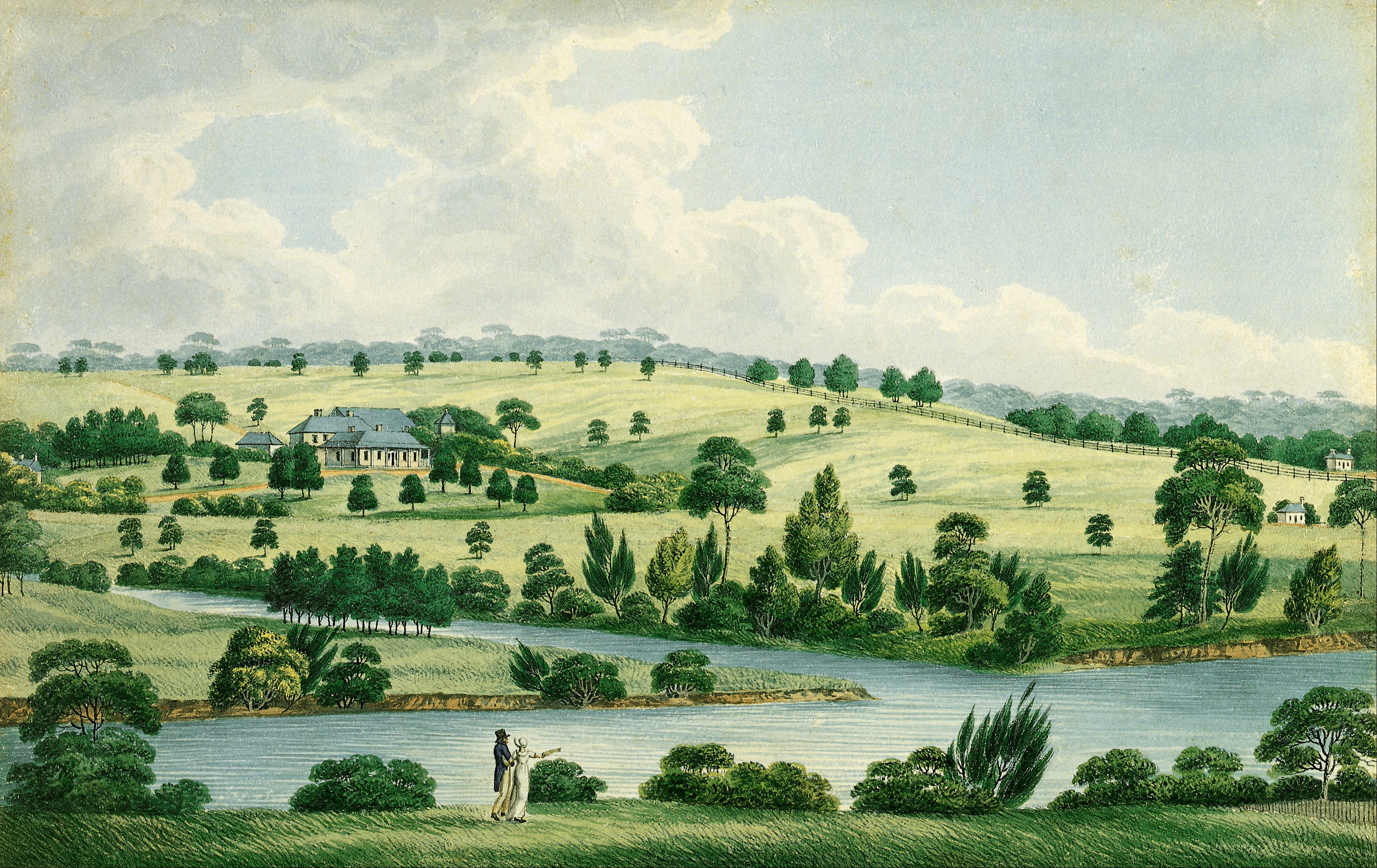
Romanticised painting of Elizabeth Farm viewed from the northern riverbank of Parramatta River by Joseph Lycett. The freshwater stream depicted in the middle as a tributary is Clay Cliff Creek.

In his Journal, surgeon John White recorded:

...we fell in with an hitherto unperceived branch of Port Jackson harbour, along the bank of which the grass was tolerably rich and succulent, and in height nearly up to the middle, interspersed with a plant much resembling the indigo. We followed this branch westward for a few miles, until we came to a small fresh-water stream that emptied itself into it. Here we took up our quarters for the night, as our halts were always regulated by fresh water, an essential point by no means to be dispensed with, and not very abundant or frequently to be met with, in this country. We made a kettle of excellent soup out of a white cockatoo and two crows, which I had shot, as we came along. The land all around us was similar to that which we had passed.

— John White, Journal of a Voyage to New South Wales, 1790

Clay Cliff Creek was the common boundary of the land grants to wool pioneer John Macarthur, who by the early 1800s extended his land grants and his Elizabeth Farm holdings to gain the complete river frontage between the township of Parramatta and Duck River.

The railway station that opened here in 1885 was originally called Subiaco, but it caused confusion because this was the name of the Benedictine school on the opposite side of Parramatta River. In 1901, the station name was changed to Camellia, after the Camellia Grove Nursery nearby that specialised in growing camellias. This land was leased by Silas Sheather since 1852 on what was originally part of the 850 acres (3.4 km^{2}) of Elizabeth Farm.

== Heritage listings ==
Camellia has a number of heritage-listed sites, including:

- Grand Avenue: Sewage Pumping Station 67

In the northwest of Camellia, today within an inaccessible industrial zone, lies the lone grave of First Fleet convict Eleanor Magee (née McCabe), her child Ian Magee, and her unborn baby. The three drowned in the adjacent Parramatta River when their boat capsized in 1793, and they were buried on what was then the land of convict Christopher Magee, their husband and father. It is one of the oldest European graves in Australia.

== Commercial area ==
Camellia is predominantly an industrial and commercial area with many motor, logisitics, cafe, manufacturing businesses and warehouses being located in the region.

Camelia is also home to Camellia Indoor Sports Centre (formerly Billbergia Sports Centre) which is home to multiple local sports teams.

This is the former site of the James Hardie asbestos plant where Bernie Banton worked.

== Transport ==
The Sandown railway line served the industry in Camellia. Passenger service ceased in 1991.

Camellia railway station on the Carlingford Line was formerly part of the Sydney Trains network before being ceased in 2020.

As a part of stage one in the Parramatta Light Rail project, Camellia railway station was destroyed and slightly north of the site, Rosehill Gardens light rail stop (which as of July 2026 is the only stop in the suburb) was opened. As a part of stage two in the project, a second line from Sydney Olympic Park will join with the Carlingford line at either Camellia or Rydalmere before both lines proceed to Westmead.

Grand Avenue is the main road in Camellia.

== Gallery ==
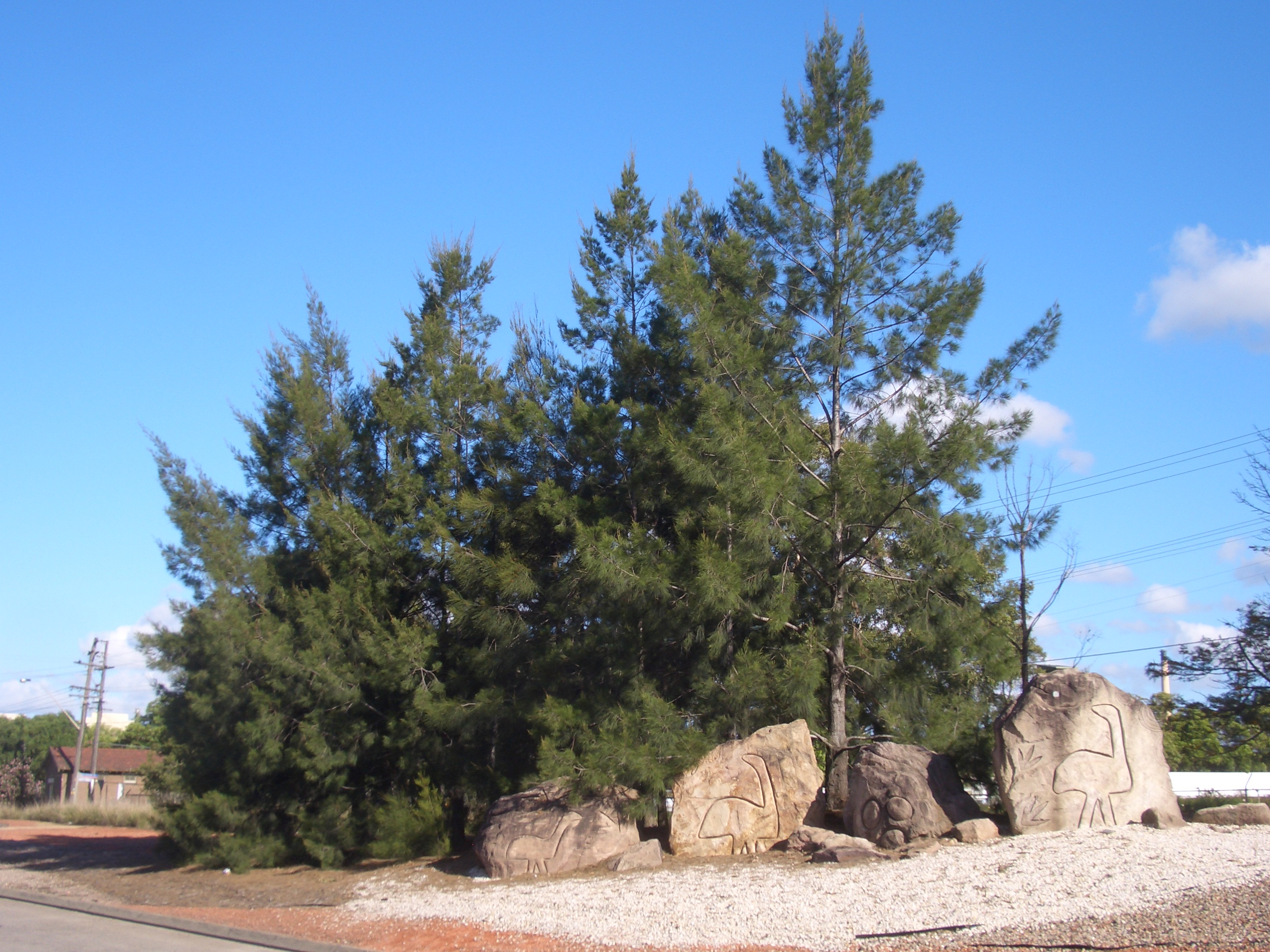
Grand Avenue, decorative rocks

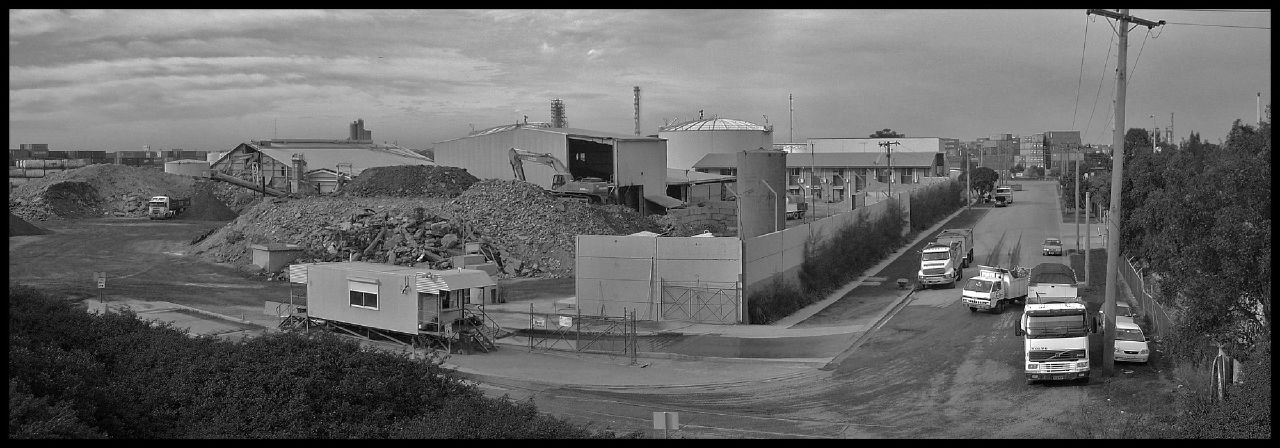
Industry in Camellia
