= Camden, Rosehill =

Camden
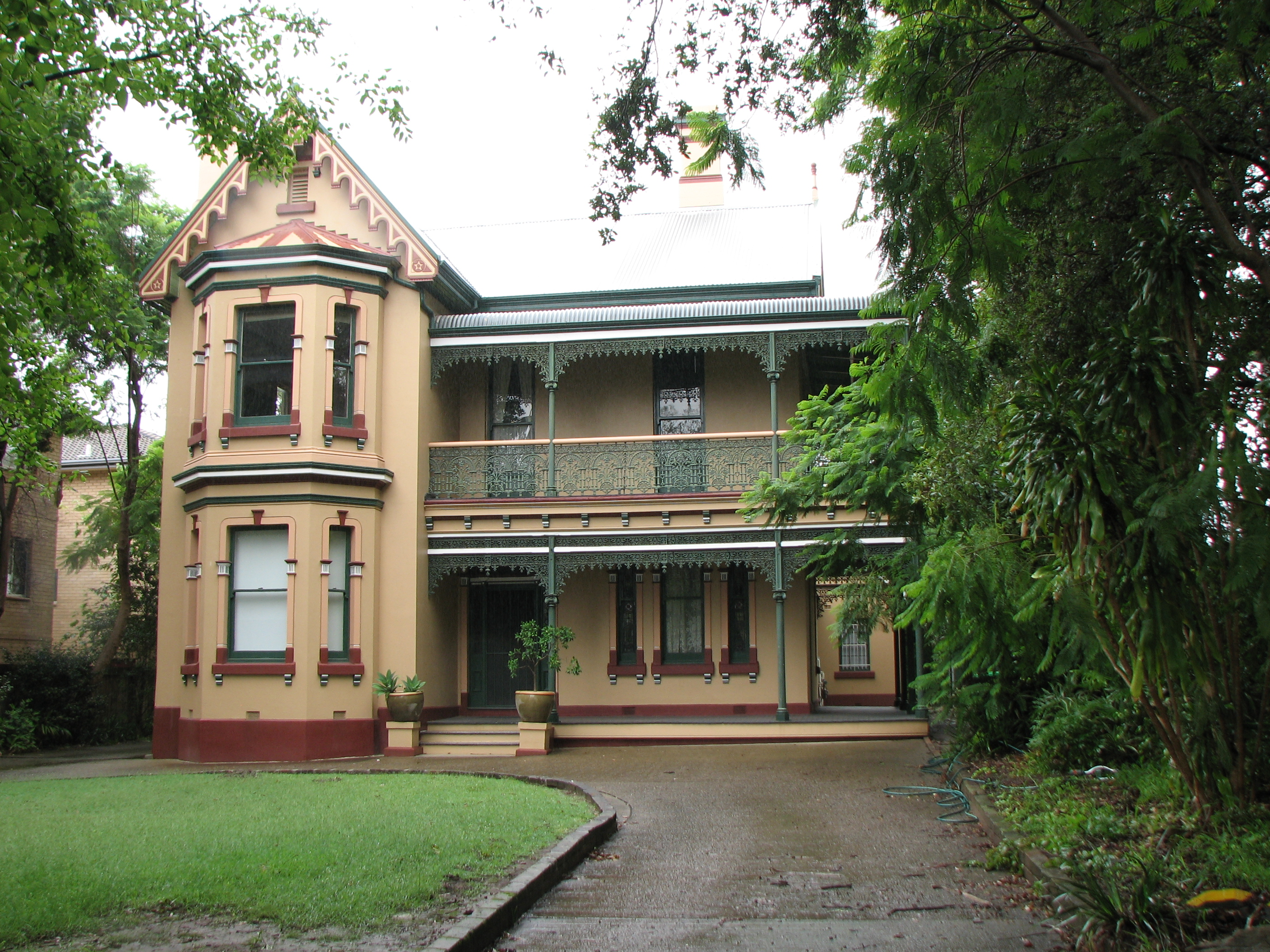
- Camden, 60 Prospect Street, Rosehill, New South Wales

- Location within Sydney Location within Australia
- 33°49′26″S 151°00′55″E
- Location: 60 Prospect Street, Rosehill, City of Parramatta, New South Wales, Australia

History
- Built: 1883

Site notes
- Architectural style: Victorian Filigree

New South Wales Heritage Register
- Official name: Camden
- Type: State heritage (complex / group)
- Designated: 2 April 1999
- Reference no.: 250
- Type: House
- Category: Residential buildings (private)

Camden is a heritage-listed residence at 60 Prospect Street, Rosehill, New South Wales, a suburb of Sydney, Australia. It was built in 1883. It was added to the New South Wales State Heritage Register on 2 April 1999.

== History ==
In February 1883, the land was auctioned as part of the first subdivision of Elizabeth Farm.

In 1888, there were only three houses recorded in Prospect Street, but by 1889 there were five, including number 60, built by Thomas S. Staff. In 1891, the house was transferred within the family to James S. Staff, who remained there until 1904.

The house appears to have been occupied by John G. Cousins, then Robert Howarth, who named it "Chelsea" in 1907. In 1908, David Irons moved in, to be replaced by Pascoe E. Pearce in 1911.

In 1913 ownership of "Chelsea" was again transferred back to the Staff family and Sydney N. Staff renamed the house "I-dun-no" in 1916, remaining there until 1919.

William Turnock then occupied the house from 1921 until 1924, Spencer W. Bates from 1925 until 1929 and Percival Whiteside at least until 1932–33.

According to descendants of the original owners the residence became used as a private nursing home and at that time acquired the name of "Camden".

The house was subdivided into two flats with the original internal staircase removed and located externally for access to the upper flat. It is understood that the Craft family resided there between 1940 and 1952 and that in or about 1953 the house was purchased for approximately 2,000 pounds.

The kitchen and bathroom were added c. 1970.

In 1984, the house was purchased by Colin & Thelma Needs and over the next 8 years a complete restoration was undertaken. The lead-based white paint that covered the exterior was stripped off & it was restored to its former glory.

Relocating the cedar staircase to inside the house- it was stripped of its modern white paint repaired/polished to original rich cedar timber. Treating rising damp in lower floor rooms, new & restored timber window frames, hardwood verandah deck (upper & lower), new wiring, all rooms re-plastered, restored marble fireplaces, new iron roof. Front door with intricate lead lights with birds restored and painted.

A complete restoration with no expense spared. Timber repairs and replacement done by Colin Needs himself -a joiner of over 40 years at the time. Paint scrapings to determine original exterior colour scheme were done and its present colours are as it was in 1884. A complete photographic record was kept of the restoration with before and after pictures in 6 volumes.

Due to the 1991 recession, the property had to be sold with the newly erected garage 98% completed. It was sold to Hume computers who occupied it until it was sold again in 2021. It was observed that the front solid timber finial is missing - thought to have been damaged by roofers during roof installation and weakened -coming off in the late 1990's.

A rear extension was built behind the garage by Hume Computers during their ownership so as to have new office space.

Purchased in 2021 by Chatterbox speech pathology.

== Description ==
Camden is a two-story Victorian Italianate villa of stuccoed brickwork with gabled corrugated iron roof. Three sided bay front on gabled wing with stucco string courses and label moulds, and large elaborately fretted bargeboards. The verandah on the northern and western facades has cast iron columns and lace balustrades, bullnose corrugated iron roof, and timber floors. Flourishing gardens and trees surround the property.

The house had been divided into two self-contained flats by sealing off the internal stair and rebuilding it within the external verandah. Original internal joinery and fireplaces are intact and only minor alterations have occurred. As of 12 September 2003, some work was required to repair cracked plaster ceilings and brickwork; otherwise the structure was in good condition and had been well maintained.

Fully restored according to Historical reference material and methods from 1984 -1992 By Colin & Thelma Needs. Application for Heritage Listing made by Colin & Thelma Needs.

== Heritage listing ==
Camden is one of the best examples of a mid-Victorian villa house in the Parramatta district. Only six other buildings of similar period and architectural style exist in the Parramatta region.

Camden was listed on the New South Wales State Heritage Register on 2 April 1999 having satisfied the following criteria.

The place is important in demonstrating the course, or pattern, of cultural or natural history in New South Wales.

This item historically significant.

The place is important in demonstrating the principal characteristics of a class of cultural or natural places/environments in New South Wales.

This item is representative.
