= A'Becketts Creek =

Tributary of the Duck River in Australia

A'Becketts

Location
- Country: Australia
- State: New South Wales
- Region: Sydney Basin (IBRA), West Central and North West Sydney
- Local government area: Parramatta

Physical characteristics
- Source
  - location: Merrylands
  - coordinates: 33°50′2.37″S 150°59′40.22″E
- 2nd source: Duck Creek
  - location: Clyde
  - coordinates: 33°49′46.9554″S 151°1′22.26″E
- Mouth: Duck River
  - location: Rosehill
  - coordinates: 33°50′6″S 151°1′49.7994″E

Basin features
- River system: Parramatta River catchment
- Tributaries
  - right: Duck Creek

A'Becketts Creek is a perennial stream and a northern tributary of the Duck River and part of the Parramatta River catchment, in Sydney, New South Wales, Australia.

== Geography ==
A'Becketts Creek is about 3.5 kilometres (2.2 mi) long. Starting from its source, near the shopping centre at Merrylands, its upper reaches have been channelized and piped underground. It flows generally east northeast, then east, joining with Duck Creek at Clyde. to flow into the Duck River at Rosehill. In its lower reaches it is a tidal creek.

A'Becketts Creek forms part of the boundary of the suburbs of Harris Park to the north, and the suburbs of Granville and Clyde to the south.

== History ==
From circa 1860, brickmaking commenced along A'Becketts Creek, adjacent to Harris Park. The site of the former Goodlet & Smith brickworks and pit at Holroyd is now a park and residential area.

In 1943 A'Becketts Creek was the site of a famous murder, where a soldier murdered and dumped the body of a boy in the creek.
