= Duck River (New South Wales) =

River in New South Wales, Australia

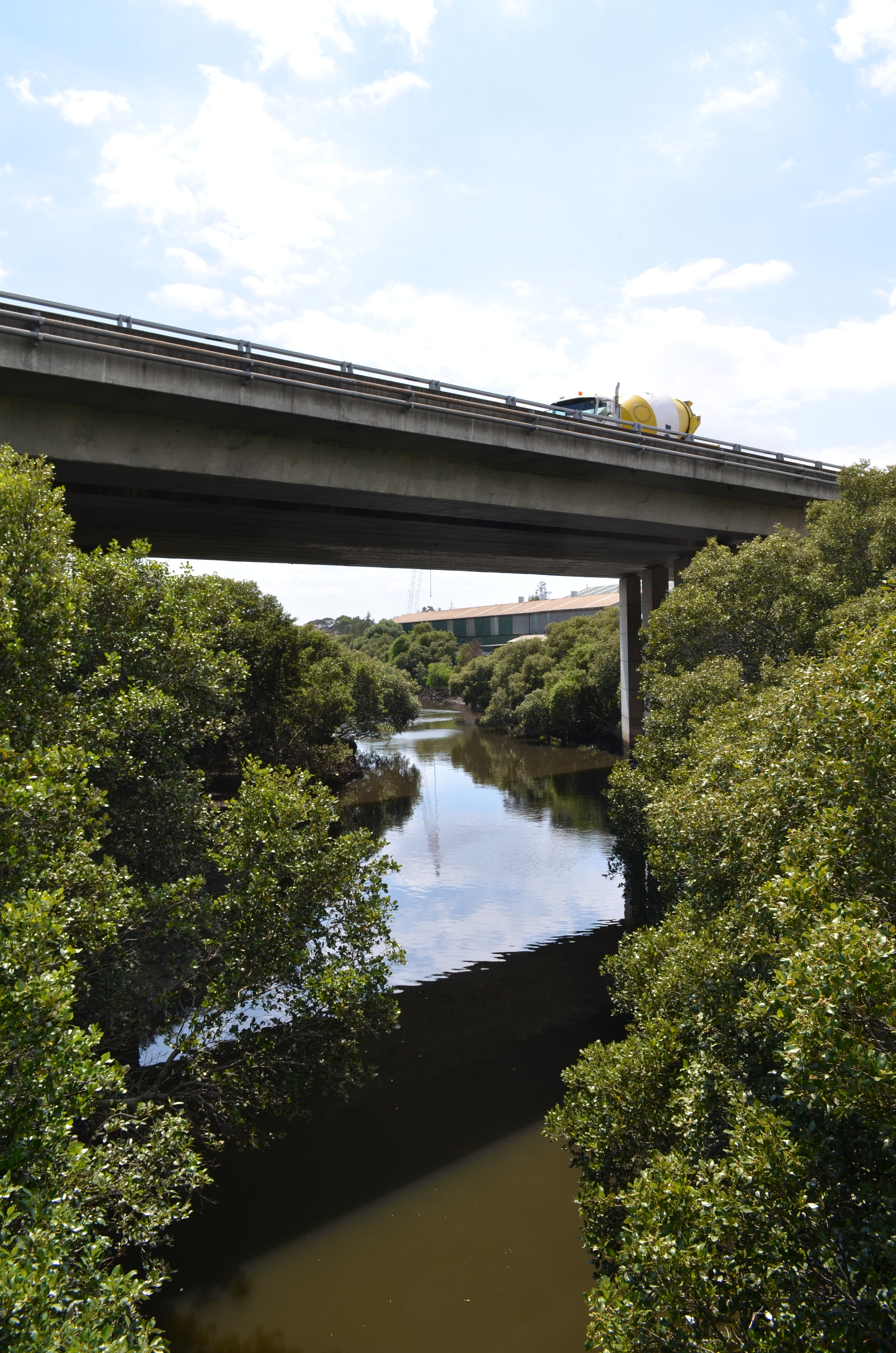
- Duck River in Clyde, passing under the M4 Western Motorway

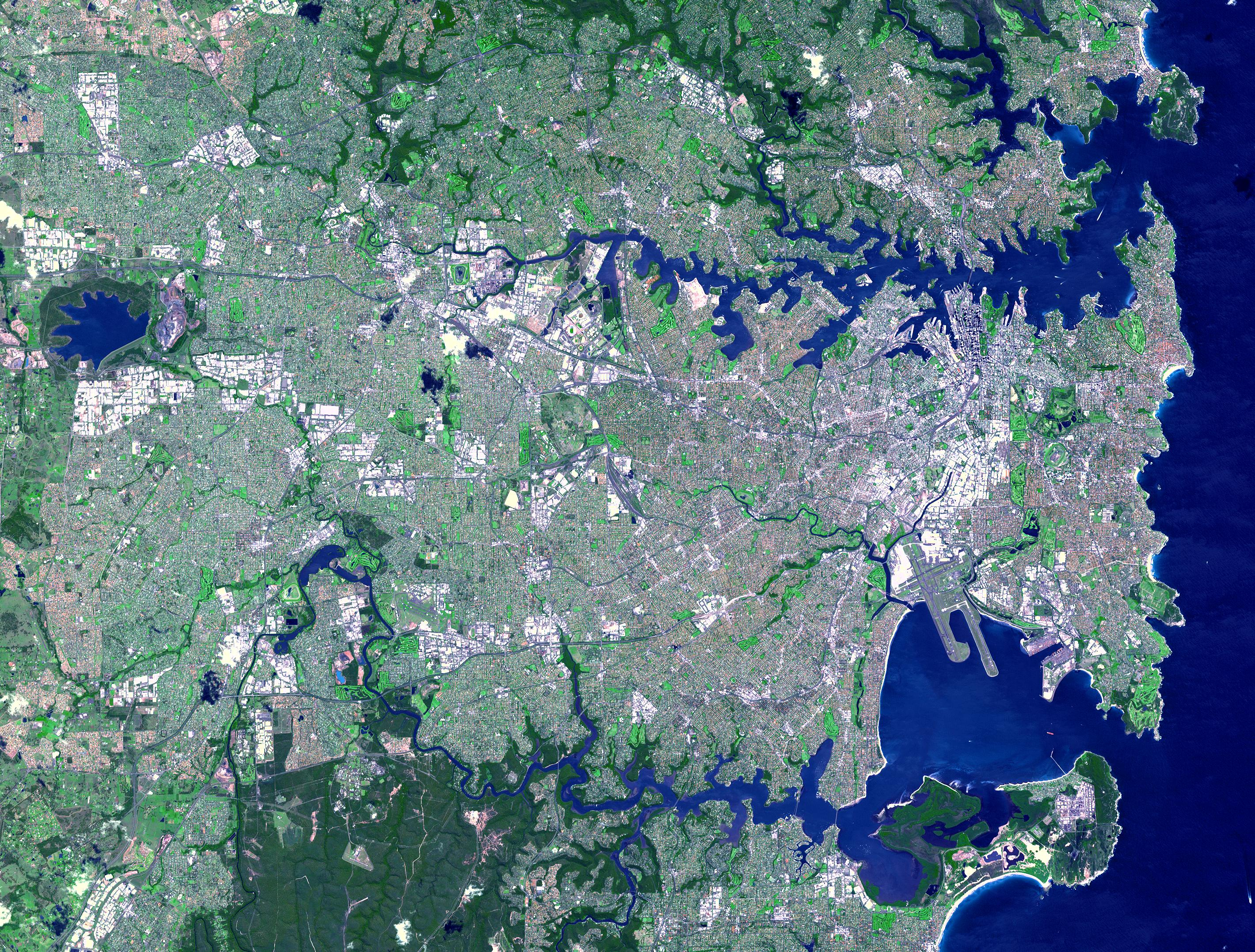
- NASA satellite view of Greater Metropolitan Sydney, with the location of the mouth of the Duck River, as marked

Location
- Country: Australia
- State: New South Wales
- Region: Sydney basin (IBRA), Greater Western Sydney
- LGAs: City of Canterbury-Bankstown, City of Parramatta, Cumberland Council

Physical characteristics
- Source: Sydney Water Supply Pipeline
  - location: Birrong/Sefton
  - coordinates: 33°52′42″S 151°0′47″E
- 2nd source: A'Becketts Creek
  - location: Rosehill
  - coordinates: 33°49′46.98″S 151°1′21.93″E
- Mouth: Parramatta River
  - location: Silverwater
  - coordinates: 33°49′28.87″S 151°2′56.35″E
- Length: 11.5 km (7.1 mi)

Basin features
- River system: Parramatta River catchment
- Tributaries
  - left: A'Becketts Creek, Duck Creek

The Duck River is a perennial stream and southern tributary of the Parramatta River, in Sydney, New South Wales, Australia.

== History ==
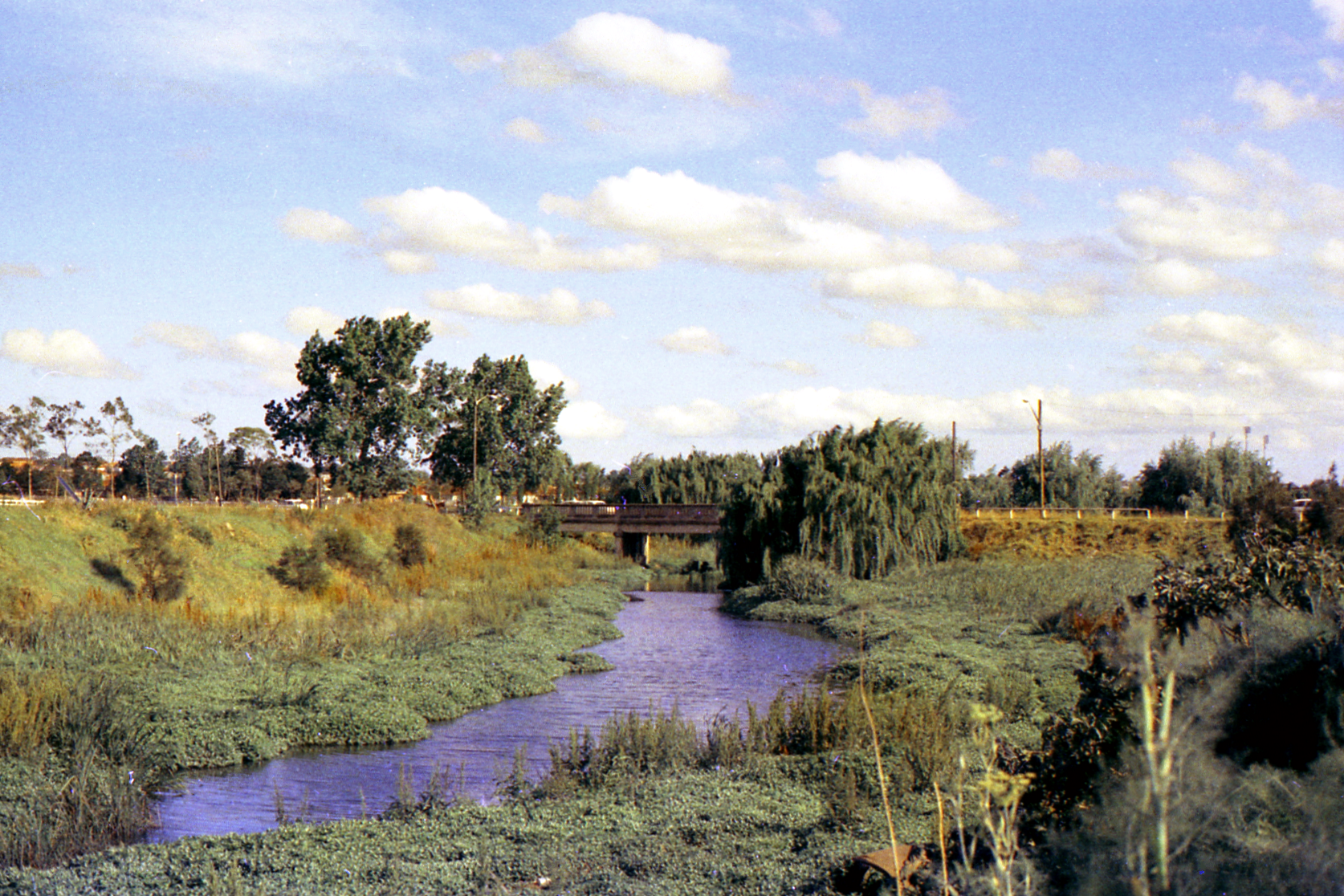
Duck River, looking towards the Mona Street bridge, South Granville in 1976.

The Darug people of the Burramattagal clan were the original inhabitants of the land at the head of the Parramatta River. The southern riverbank was a vital source of their food and living resources. In their seasonal rotation of campsites around their territory, the clan would have found that the abundant fish, shellfish, birds, reptiles and marsupials contributed greatly to their daily quest for food. The agreed boundary between the Burramattagal country and their neighbours, the Wategora clan, is believed to have been the Duck River.

On 22 April 1788 Governor Arthur Phillip and his party of officers and marines journeyed inland by boat from Sydney Cove to find better farmlands for the new settlement. At the head of the navigable river they landed on the shore near Clyde of what he named Duck River due to the abundance of ducks in the area. They left their boats to explore the area but could not penetrate the thick bush.

In the early 1800s John Macarthur extended his land grants and his Elizabeth Farm holdings to gain the complete river frontage between the township of Parramatta and Duck River.

Early surveys and maps suggest the Duck River area downstream from the confluence with A'Becketts Creek was a wetland of saltmarsh, rushes and grasses. Upstream, the Eucalypt forest adjoining Duck River was cleared by the Australian Timber Company to supply railway sleepers and firewood during and after the construction of the Sydney to Parramatta railway in the 1850s.

In 1882, Hudson Brothers, renamed in 1898 Clyde Engineering was built nearby to the river. In 1908 the Fells Oil Refinery, and in 1928 the Clyde Refinery was built on left hand bank where Duck River joins the Parramatta River.

In June 2020, Duck River's colour unexpectedly turned into a deep shade of purple. It was first spotted by an Auburn resident, who then alerted the Cumberland Shire Council. A thorough investigation commenced after that, reporting that it was a case of river pollution. When the investigation was over, they concluded that an ink manufacturer based in Auburn was the culprit. They had made a new batch of purple ink, which flowed into their stormwater basins. They failed to detect this, and it overflowed into the river. The company was fined $88,000 by the NSW Environment Protection Authority toward environmental clean-up programs.

== Geography ==
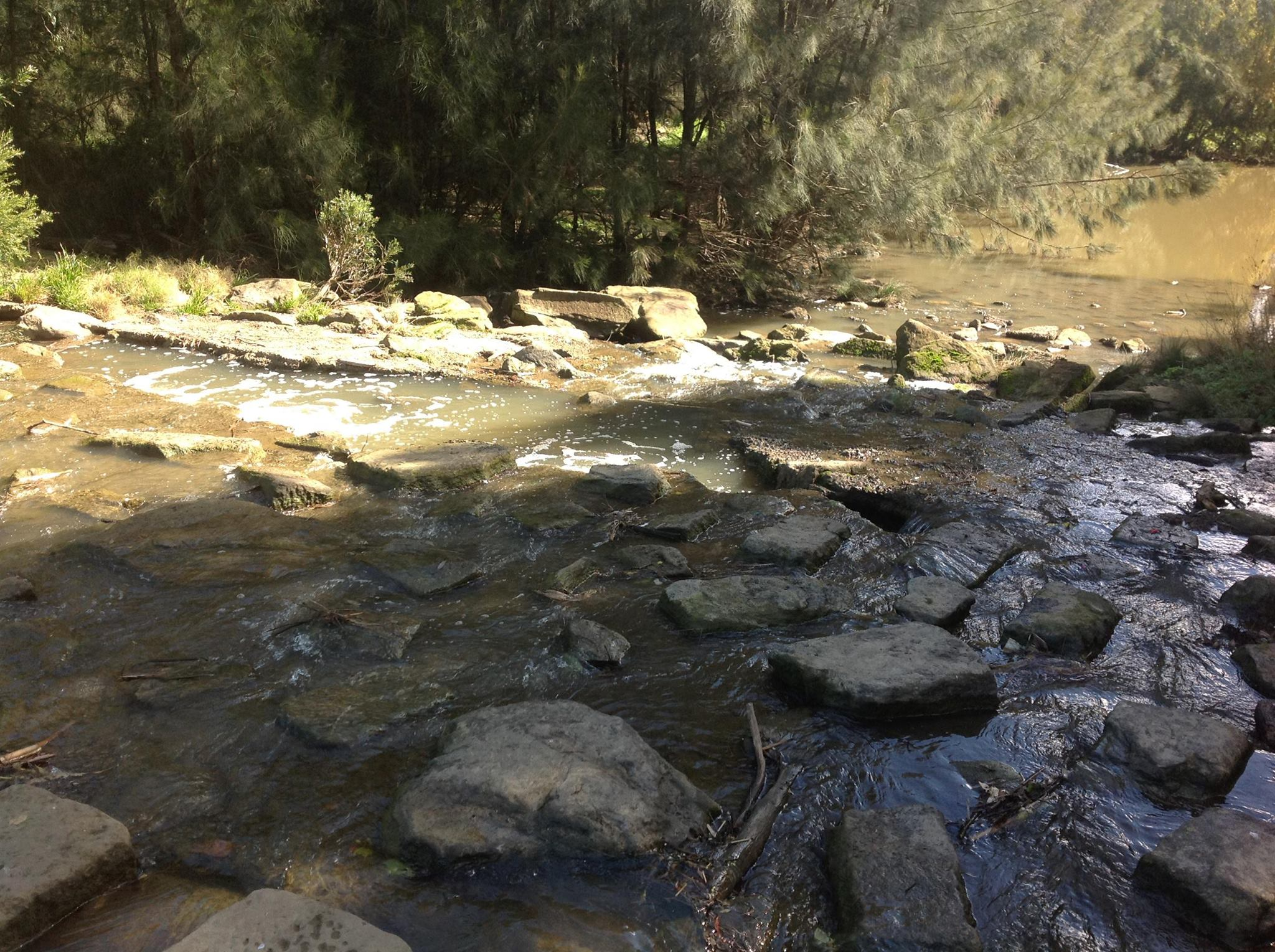
The Duck River on the border of Auburn and South Granville

The Duck River flows in a generally north then east-north-east direction for about 11.5 kilometres (7.1 mi) from where it rises from a drain in the suburb of Birrong to where it joins the Parramatta River at Silverwater. In its lower reaches it is a tidal creek.

The Wetlands are of regional conservation significance, providing home to three Endangered Ecological Communities and several threatened species, and are highly valued by the local community.

The Duck River Catchment commences in the Canterbury–Bankstown local government area, near Bankstown and Condell Park. The area drains north through a system of stormwater pipes and open drains to the Sydney Water Supply Pipeline at Sefton, which is the boundary between Canterbury–Bankstown City and Parramatta City. From here, a more natural watercourse continues through the Parramatta and Cumberland local government areas to eventually join the Parramatta River.

Downstream, A'Becketts Creek flows into Duck River at Rosehill, near the M4 Western Motorway overpass of James Ruse Drive and the Rosehill Heliport/Airport.

== Wategora Reserve ==
Wategora Reserve is named after the Wategora tribe, also translated as Wadi(g)ora, who inhabited the local area along Duck River. The Wategora were also known as the Duck River Tribe who lived around and above the tidal limit. This important bushland area is situated on the Duck River, 5 kilometres (3.1 mi) south of the Parramatta River, opposite Auburn Golf Course. 246 indigenous species of plants are recorded at the Wellington Road Reserve.

A remnant of the Cumberland Plain Woodland, the 11 hectare area canopy consists of eucalyptus woodland, dominated by grey box and broad-leaved ironbark. Three species of tea trees (Melaleuca) are also common. However, other unusual plants known from wetter areas include turpentine, cheese tree, red mahogany and coffee bush. Grey gum grow near an outcrop of Minchinbury Sandstone. Wildflowers are common in late winter, and small orchids may be observed. Being surrounded by suburbia, the reserve is affected by weeds. Bush regeneration programs are in place.

Native wildlife includes possums, many species of birds, and reptiles such as the water skink and red-bellied black snake. Budgerigars and brush turkeys have been recorded in the reserve.

== See also ==
- Duck Creek, a tributary of A'Becketts Creek
- List of rivers of Australia
- List of rivers of New South Wales (A–K)
- Rivers of New South Wales
