= Elizabeth Farm Reserve =

Public Reserve associated with Elizabeth Farm
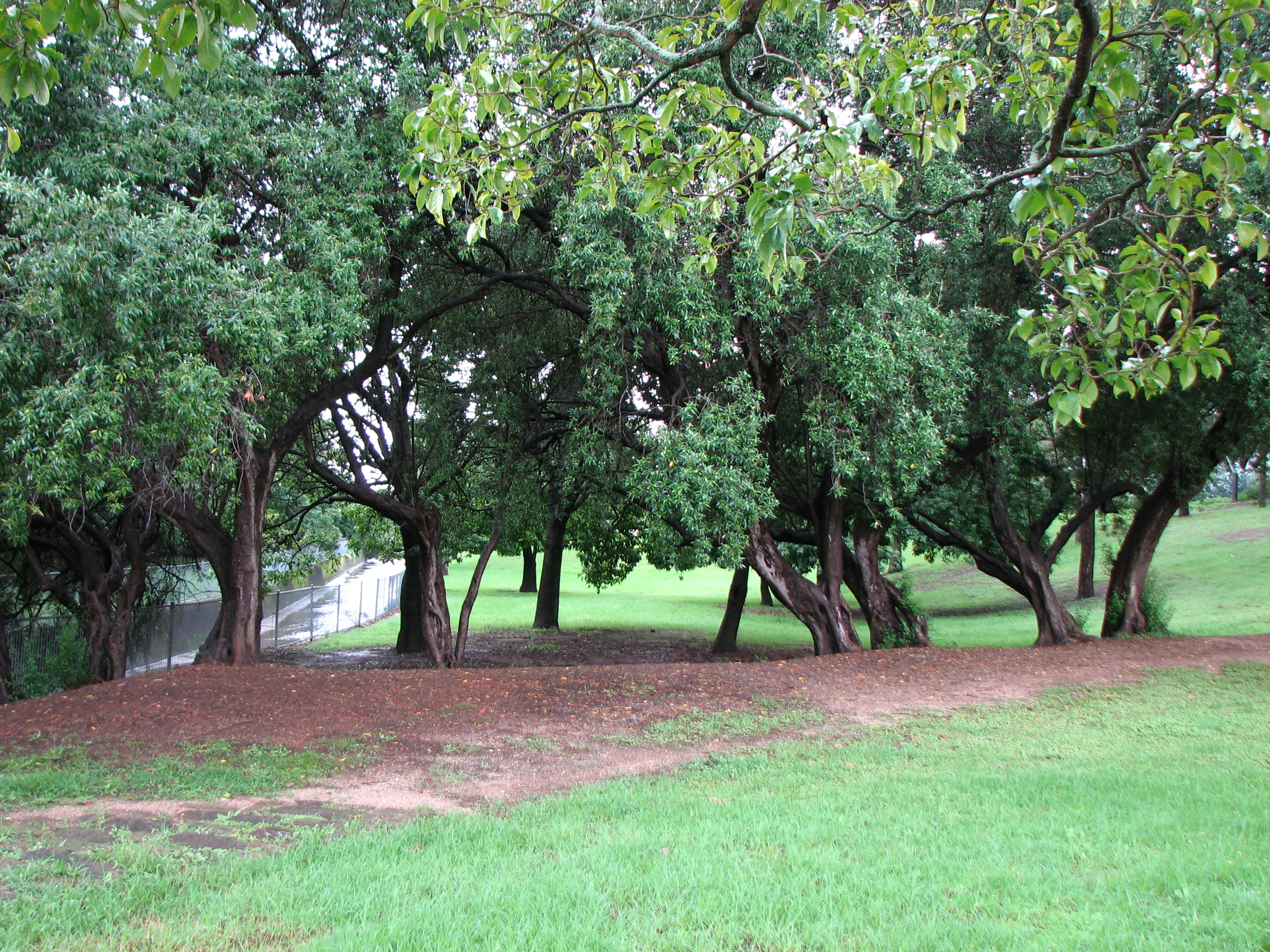
- View of part of Elizabeth Farm reserve

- Location within New South Wales Location within Australia
- 33.8208°S 151.0178°E
- Location: Arthur Street, Rosehill, City of Parramatta, New South Wales, Australia

Site notes
- Owner: Parramatta City Council

New South Wales Heritage Register
- Official name: Public Reserve associated with Elizabeth Farm
- Type: state heritage (landscape)
- Designated: 2 April 1999
- Reference no.: 285
- Type: Historic Landscape
- Category: Landscape - Cultural

Elizabeth Farm Reserve is a heritage-listed public reserve on former farmland associated with Elizabeth Farm in Sydney, Australia. It is located off Arthur Street in the suburb of Rosehill, New South Wales. The property is owned by Parramatta City Council. It was added to the New South Wales State Heritage Register on 2 April 1999.

== History ==
The reserve adjoins the Elizabeth Farm museum and is now public parkland. It is bounded by Arthur Street, Alice Street, Alfred Street and Clay Cliff Creek.

A Permanent Conservation Order was made over the site on 25 November 1983.

== Heritage listing ==
Elizabeth Farm is associated with major figures who were prominent in the 19th century development of the colony, including John and Elizabeth Macarthur, and the Swann family in the 20th century. There is a large surviving collection of documentary evidence connected to the house, which contains part of the oldest surviving European construction in Australia. The garden contains some of the earliest European plantings in Australia. It is an example of early colonial architecture and early agricultural experiments.

The property forms the core of a major historic farm estate which was highly influential in the development of the wool industry in Australia, the introduction and acclimatisation of plants and economic crops such as olives and vines. By its size, location and history of subdivision the property was influential on the development of the town of Parramatta.

The property is also significant in the history of conservation in NSW, being the first to be preserved by direct acquisition by the State Government, and the second property to have a permanent conservation order placed over it under the Heritage Act 1977.

Elizabeth Farm Reserve was listed on the New South Wales State Heritage Register on 2 April 1999.
