= Comfort Lodge =

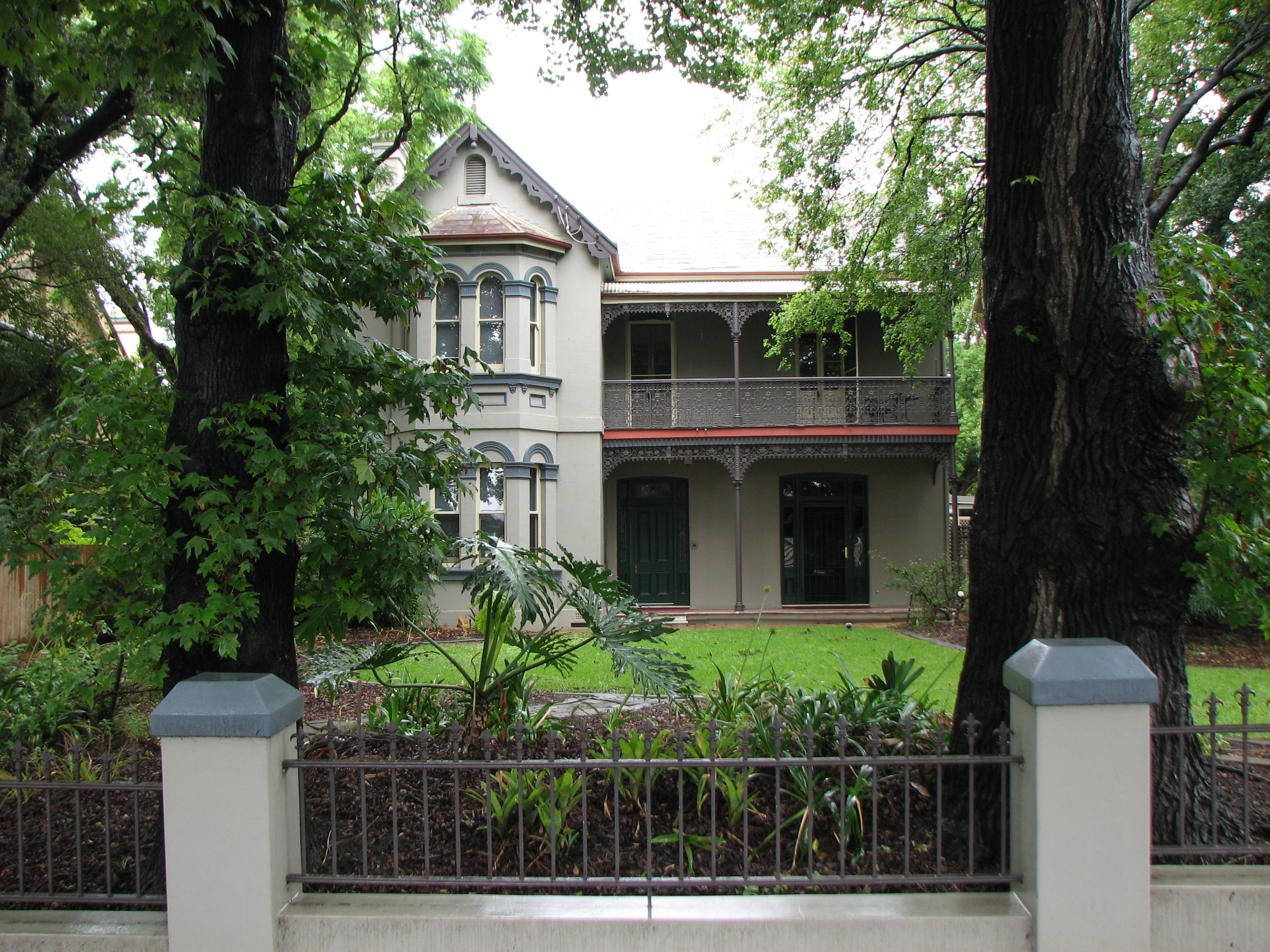
- Comfort Lodge, 62 Prospect Street, Rosehill, New South Wales

- Location within Sydney Location within Australia
- 33°49′25″S 151°00′54″E
- Location: 62 Prospect Street, Rosehill, City of Parramatta, New South Wales, Australia

History
- Built: 1880

New South Wales Heritage Register
- Official name: Comfort Lodge
- Type: State heritage (built)
- Designated: 2 April 1999
- Reference no.: 283
- Type: House
- Category: Residential buildings (private)

Comfort Lodge is a heritage-listed former residence and boarding house, now offices, at 62 Prospect Street, Rosehill, New South Wales, a suburb of Sydney, Australia. It was built in 1880. It is also known as Cransley. It was added to the New South Wales State Heritage Register on 2 April 1999.

== History ==
The land on which Comfort Lodge stands was auctioned as part of the first subdivision of Elizabeth Farm in February 1883, at which time it was bought by builder William Cameron. He built the house c. 1889, naming it "Cransley". One subsequent owner was Edwin John Brown OBE, a 29-year Parramatta alderman. It was renamed Comfort Lodge in 1982, when it was turned into a boarding house. A Permanent Conservation Order was placed over Comfort Lodge on 2 December 1983. Since 1989, it has been used as professional chambers. It was transferred to the State Heritage Register on 2 April 1999.

== Description ==
Comfort Lodge is a two-storey Victorian Italianate villa of stuccoed brickwork with gabled corrugated iron roof. It has a three-sided bay front on gabled wing with stucco string courses and label moulds and elaborately fretted bargeboards. It also has a two-storey verandah to the north and east sides and has a bullnose corrugated iron roof, timber floors and cast iron posts, balustrading and valence. It is set well back from the road.

== Heritage listing ==
Comfort Lodge is a very good example of a mid-Victorian house in the Parramatta district. It is complemented and enhanced by the adjoining Victorian residence "Camden" which is identical in design. Only six other buildings of similar period and architectural style exist in the Parramatta region.

Comfort Lodge was listed on the New South Wales State Heritage Register on 2 April 1999 having satisfied the following criteria.
