= Elizabeth Macarthur =

Colonial Australian pastoralist (1766–1850)

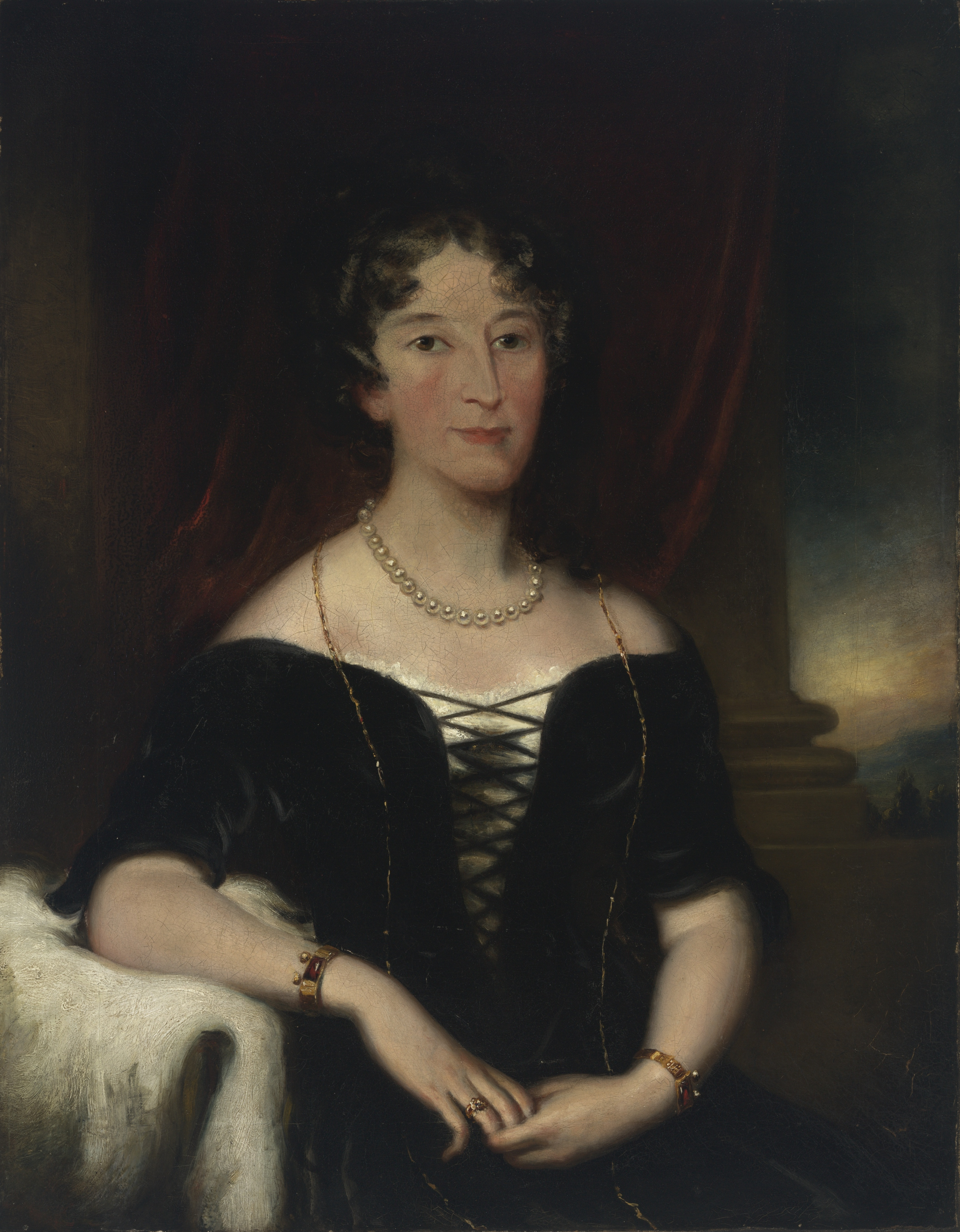
- An oil painting of Macarthur by an unknown artist
- Born: Elizabeth Veale; 14 August 1766; Bridgerule, Devon, England
- Died: 9 February 1850 (aged 83); Watsons Bay, New South Wales
- Occupations: Pastoralist and merchant
- Known for: Letters recording early colonial New South Wales; managing the Macarthur pastoral estates
- Spouse: John Macarthur (m. 1788; died 1834)
- Children: 9; including: Edward Macarthur; William Macarthur; James Macarthur (1798–1867)
- Parent(s): Richard Veale; Grace Veale

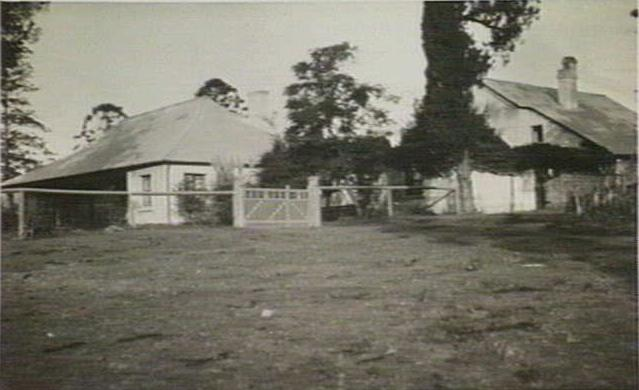
Elizabeth Farm.

Elizabeth Macarthur (née Veale; 14 August 1766 – 9 February 1850) was an English-born pastoralist and businesswoman in colonial New South Wales and was a pioneer of the Australian wool industry. She managed the family estate, Elizabeth Farm, and oversaw the wool-growing that helped establish New South Wales as a reliable supplier of fine wool; especially through the breeding of the Australian Merino sheep.

As the wife of John Macarthur she sailed to the colony on the Second Fleet in 1790 and, in doing so, was the first soldier's wife to arrive in New South Wales.

Her letters became an early record of the Sydney settlement and its society.

== Early life ==
Macarthur was born in Bridgerule England, the daughter of provincial farmers, Richard and Grace Veale of Cornish origin. They were an educated and affluent family. Macarthur's father died when she was aged four; her mother remarried when she was eleven and Macarthur was left in the care of her grandfather.

In 1788 Macarthur married Plymouth soldier John Macarthur and, in 1790, with her newborn son Edward, she accompanied John to the recently established colony of New South Wales, travelling on the Second Fleet. They initially set sail on the Neptune, but after her husband duelled with the first master of the ship, they transferred to the Scarborough. During this journey Macarthur wrote many letters to her family, and these are one of the best records of early voyages on convict transports.

During the journey Macarthur gave birth to a daughter who did not survive, and the health of Edward also declined.

They arrived in Sydney on 28 June 1790.

== Life in New South Wales ==
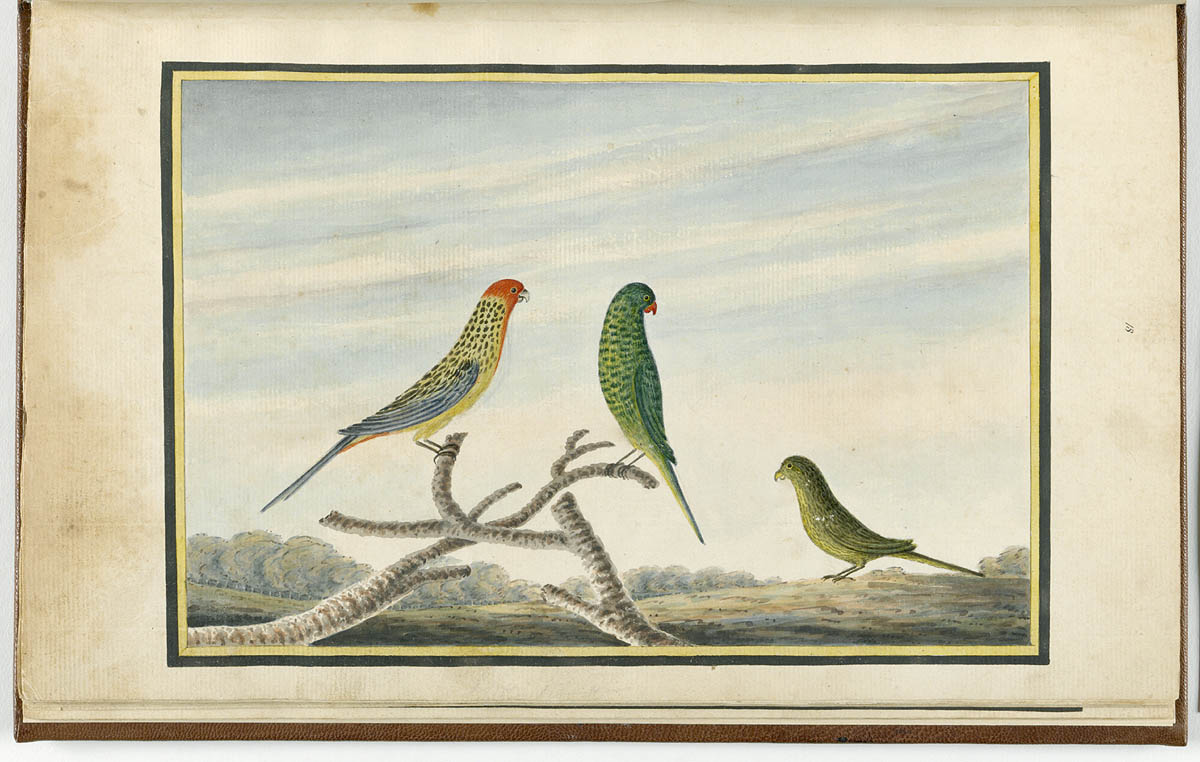
Watercolour of parrots attributed to Macarthur, 1807; the Rose Hill parrot (now the eastern rosella) is at left

Macarthur was the first soldier's wife to arrive in New South Wales. Her letters provide a record of the infant convict town of Sydney and colonial life. She "held court" with members of society.

Her husband John made many enemies, and this could make her position difficult, especially following his removal from public life by Governor Arthur Phillip following a string of arguments by the end of 1790. Despite this, Philip continued to be friendly with Elizabeth Macarthur and appreciated her company. She was also a close friend to Matthew Flinders. Macarthur actively worked to ameliorate some of her husband's missteps.

John was granted a level of forgiveness by Major Francis Grose and, in 1792, became Paymaster to the New South Wales Corps and Director of Public Works. He was later made Commandant at Parramatta. In 1793 Grose also gave the family a land grant at Rosehill which John named Elizabeth Farm in her honour.

== Role in founding Australian wool industry ==
By 1794 the Macarthurs had built their own house at Elizabeth Farm and, despite it being a small farm, it was the first of only a few in the colony and allowed them to live comfortably, They slowly took over more properties and farm holdings in the region.

Between 1801 and 1805, following the Rum Rebellion, John Macarthur was sent to England on court-martial and was again sent there again between 1808 and 1817 for his refusal to accept the terms of his return to New South Wales. In his absence Macarthur ran Elizabeth Farm as well as their other properties at Parramatta, Camden, Seven Hills, and Pennant Hills. This included management of household and business accounts, employment of convict labour, supervision of wool washing, baling, and transport, and the selection of rams and breeding to improve the flock. It was also Macarthur who selected sheep to improve the quality of the wool produced at the farms while John, in England, helped to sell it to international markets.

In additional to farming sheep and their wool Macarthur also farmed eggs and dairy products which were sold locally. She was also the first settler in New South Wales to make hay for sale and is likely the inventor of a slow burning technique for removing stumps.

At the Camden Park property she was also assisted by her nephew Hannibal Hawkins Macarthur who she helped train.

When John Macarthur returned to Australia Macarthur spent less time on property affairs and, by the mid-1820s, was living quite separately from him as he based his time at Camden Park where he was building a mansion, and she spent more time in Sydney and Parramatta. This decision was exacerbated by John's mental health issues, for which at various points, Macarthur made the decision to have him restrained and kept in seclusion. He died on 11 April 1834 and, following his death she wrote to her son Edward:

I had freely indulged myself with the hope that it would have pleased God to restore the dear departed for a more sane state of mind. I think he might have been at peace with his family - that he was restored to reason for a few minutes I have no doubt - more was not granted.

— Elizabeth MacArthur, Portion of a letter to her son Edward MacArthur, 17 May 1834

== Relationship with First Nations peoples ==
When Macarthur first arrived in New South Wales she was curious about the Aboriginal people living there and, in her early years in Sydney, would often dine with and visit Aboriginal friends. However, she was ignorant as to Aboriginal laws and customs and showed no respect for or acknowledgement of Aboriginal land rights.

Over years her opinion of Aboriginal people hardened, particularly following the Hawkesbury and Nepean Wars between 1794 and 1816 and, even closer to home, the Battle of Parramatta in 1797 and the Appin massacre in 1816.

Macarthur's land holdings also displaced many Aboriginal people (primarily Dharug people) from their lands and, through the agricultural activities and particularly the raising of sheep, land was degraded and traditional food sources such as the kangaroo were hunted off.

== Later life and death ==
Macarthur died on 9 February 1850.

== Family ==
From nine pregnancies, seven children survived childhood. Her sons, Edward (1789–1872), James (1793–1794), John (1794–1831), James (1798–1867) and William (1800–1882), were active in colonial governance, agriculture, politics and trade. Her eldest daughter Elizabeth (1792–1842) remained unmarried, despite at least two 'offers' declined by her parents. Her younger daughters Mary (Mrs Bowman, b.1795) and Emmeline (b.1808) married into colonial families.

Sir Edward Macarthur (1789–1872) married Sarah (née Neil) in 1862, and they died childless.

- James Macarthur (1798–1867) married Emily (née Stone). They had only one child, daughter Elizabeth (1840–1911).
- Sir William Macarthur (1800–1882) never married.

The bulk of the Macarthur estate, through the brothers William, James and Edward, passed to James' only child, daughter Elizabeth (1840–1911), who in 1867 married Arthur Onslow (1833–1882). In 1892, after Arthur's death, Elizabeth changed the family name to Macarthur-Onslow. She and Arthur had six children, including James Macarthur-Onslow (1867–1946), George Macarthur-Onslow (1875–1931) and Arthur Macarthur-Onslow (1879–1938).

== Legacy ==
Macarthur is commemorated on the 1995 Australian five-dollar coin which was struck for inclusion in a special Masterpieces in Silver collector proof set entitled Colonial Australia. She was posthumously inducted onto the Victorian Honour Roll of Women in 2001.

Macarthur is the subject of a fictitious memoir, A Room Made of Leaves, by Australian author, Kate Grenville, published in 2020.

The following places are also named for Macarthur:

- Elizabeth Macarthur Bay, an inlet in Pyrmont on Sydney Harbour on land once owned by the couple.
- Elizabeth Macarthur Creek, in north western Sydney.
- Elizabeth Macarthur Park, in Parramatta.
- The Elizabeth Macarthur Agricultural Institute is named in her honour. It is the largest Centre of Excellence operated by New South Wales Department of Primary Industries, employing 200 scientists and located at Camden Park.
- Elizabeth Macarthur High School in Narellan Vale in Sydney's western suburbs.
