= Camellia Indoor Sports Centre =

Sports venue in Sydney, Australia

Coordinates: 33.8200°S 151.0273°E

- Interactive map of Camellia Indoor Sports Centre
- Former names: Billbergia Sports Centre
- Location: Camellia, New South Wales, Australia
- Capacity: ~1000

Construction
- Built: 2021-2022
- Opened: 2022

Website
- https://camelliaindoor.com.au/

Camellia Indoor Sports Centre (formerly Billbergia Sports Centre) is a multipurpose indoor sports centre located in the suburb Camellia located east of Parramatta and in the Western Sydney region of Sydney, Australia. It is currently owned by Sydney Sport Management Group.

== History and construction ==
On the 17th of November 2021, work begun on the construction of Billbergia Sports Centre a new state of the art indoor sports centre in an effort to help Parramatta become a stronger and more established area in every aspect. Another driving factor of the construction of the sports centre was providing a home to the Inner West Bulls Basketball Club.

This sport centre was built to include 4 FIBA standard basketball courts with the ability to host a wide variety of sports, a café, meeting rooms and a soft play area for young children.

It was originally scheduled to open in March 2022 however after some delays it was finally officially opened in September 2022.

On the 25th of October 2024, Sydney Sport Management Group (SSM Group) a company with many years in taking care of and owning sports centres entered into a partnership agreement with Billbergia Property Group to take over Billbergia Sports Centre until eventually renaming it to Camellia Indoor Sports Centre the name that has stuck till today.

== Sports ==
Camellia Indoor Sports Centre is home to many social and competitive competitions in a wide variety of sports, the major ones described below. All information is up to date as of July 2026.

=== Basketball ===
Basketball in the sports centre is very important as not only was the entire sports centre originally built and supported for the purpose of basketball and with high quality maintained FIBA basketball courts but the PCBA (Parramatta Cumberland Basketball Association) uses it as one of its competition venues.

Its courts are also used for five versus five basketball competitions.

There are also a young hoopers program aimed at teaching children basketball and get them more active.

=== Volleyball ===
Volleyball in the sports centre is covered with two volleyball training groups and one competition level team based from the centre.

Volleyball training is covered under programs like Going Global Volleyball and Sparrows Volleyball both aimed at teaching volleyball to a wide range of skillsets and ages.

Competition volleyball is represented by Camellias Crimson Rosellas a new growing volleyball based club taking part in the YSVL and SVL competitions organised by Volleyball NSW (New South Wales state organisation of Volleyball Australia). The team has also communicated about hosting in-house tournaments at the sports centre.

=== Netball ===
Ladies and mixed netball competitions are held in the sports centre as a part of Anderson Events (which also hold Futsal and Basketball competitions in Camellia).

=== Futsal ===
Futsal is represented in the sports centre with the five versus five premier league and division one futsal league matches being held in the sports centre.

=== Sports list ===
Camellia is also home to other one day off events and competitions for the wide variety of sports they can support. Below is a list of all sports held in some form at Camellia Indoor Sports Centre.

| Basketball | Volleyball | Netball | Futsall | Pickleball | Powerchair Hockey | Wheelchair Rugby |

== Events ==
At this time it has not hosted any major sporting events.
