= Sewage Pumping Station 67 =

Sewage pumping station in Camellia, Australia

- Location within Sydney Location within Australia
- 33.8183°S 151.0237°E
- Location: Grand Avenue, North Camellia, City of Parramatta, Sydney, New South Wales, Australia

History
- Built: 1929–1930

Site notes
- Architect: Metropolitan Water Sewerage and Drainage Board
- Architectural style: Federation Free Style
- Owner: Sydney Water

New South Wales Heritage Register
- Official name: Sewage Pumping Station 67; SPS 67. SP0067
- Type: State heritage (built)
- Designated: 15 November 2002
- Reference no.: 1643
- Type: Sewage Pump House/Pumping Station
- Category: Utilities - Sewerage
- Builders: Public Works Department

Sewage Pumping Station 67 is a heritage-listed sewage pumping station located on Grand Avenue, in the Sydney suburb of Camellia, in the City of Parramatta local government area of New South Wales, Australia. It was designed and built by the Metropolitan Water, Sewerage and Drainage Board from 1929 to 1930. It is also known as SPS 67 and SP0067. The pumping station is owned by Sydney Water. It was added to the New South Wales State Heritage Register on 15 November 2002.

== History ==
Early in the development of Parramatta, the Parramatta River was used for the disposal of sewage. By the early 20th century, when the effects of the polluted river could no longer be tolerated, a bacterial treatment plant was constructed by the Public Works Department and transferred to the Parramatta Council. The scheme provided for combined sewerage and drainage and drained to a steam pumping station which lifted the sewage to a treatment plant for processing before discharge to the river. The system was transferred to the Metropolitan Board of Water Supply & Sewerage in 1916. In 1930 the treatment works ceased operation with the completion of the Northern Suburbs Ocean Outfall Sewer (NSOOS) to Dundas and construction of SP0067, which then collected all of the sewage previously flowing to the treatment works and pumped it through a rising main to the NSOOS at Dundas.

The pumping units were installed in 1956 and units in about 1966 when they replaced the original pumps.

== Description ==
SP0067, Camellia is a low level sewage pumping station located adjacent to James Ruse Drive. Architecturally the building was designed in a utilitarian version of the Federation Free Style. Externally there is a tiled gable roof with three large ventilators and boxed eaves; light brown tuck pointed brickwork formed into bays by brick piers with a rendered string course and polychrome dentil course; and large multi-paned steel framed windows. The front facade consists of a gabled parapet with a curvilinear apex feature, rendered cornice, projecting brick piers and a rendered string course. The entrance consists of a steel roller shutter door with a rendered bracketed cornice over. There are mature palm trees near the entrance to the site along with a row of cypress pines. The station is located adjacent to several office buildings, with a park-like setting located immediately to the front of the site.

The building fabric is substantially intact.

== Heritage listing ==
SP0067 is of historic, aesthetic and technical/research significance. Historically it was the first low level sewage pumping station constructed in the Parramatta district. Its construction along with the completion of the NSOOS ended the discharge of treated sewage into the Parramatta River, which greatly improved the public health of Parramatta and paved the way for the continued urban expansion of the region. Aesthetically, it is an impressive example of an industrial utility building designed in the Federation Free Style and is noteworthy for the extensive use of tuck pointed brickwork, which is indicative of the public importance of the station at the time. Technically, it is a fine example of sewage pumping station design which has proved to be very effective, as evidenced by its continual use for over 70 years.

Sewage Pumping Station 67 was listed on the New South Wales State Heritage Register on 15 November 2002 having satisfied the following criteria.

The place is important in demonstrating the course, or pattern, of cultural or natural history in New South Wales.

SP0067, Camellia was commissioned in 1931 and played an important role in the major advance in the protection of the public health of the Parramatta region by ending the discharge of treated sewage into the Parramatta River. The construction of SP0067 and the NSOOS helped pave the way for the continued growth of Parramatta, Auburn and surrounding region.

The place is important in demonstrating aesthetic characteristics and/or a high degree of creative or technical achievement in New South Wales.

SP0067 is one of the largest low level sewage pumping stations in the Sydney Water Corporation system. The building was designed in an industrial version of the Federation Free Style, exploiting the use of good face brickwork and contrasting rendered string courses and cornices. Whilst the style of the building is not innovative for the period, it is unique due to its sheer scale and attention to detail, including the use of tuck pointed brickwork which is rare for a building of this size and age. It is visually prominent and makes a positive contribution to the local cultural landscape.

The place has strong or special association with a particular community or cultural group in New South Wales for social, cultural or spiritual reasons.

Item is listed on the National Trust (NSW) Register and is thus recognised by an identifiable group, and as such has importance to the broader community. The development of the station greatly reduced pollution of the Parramatta River. It took sewage from Lidcombe Hospital, which was the responsibility of the Health Department.

The place has potential to yield information that will contribute to an understanding of the cultural or natural history of New South Wales.

SP0067 has the potential to reveal information about the construction techniques and design of the superstructure and substructure. The pumping station still fulfills its role over 70 years after its introduction as a low level sewage pumping station as originally designed and constructed albeit with some mechanical upgrading.

The place possesses uncommon, rare or endangered aspects of the cultural or natural history of New South Wales.

SP0067 is rare as the largest SPS at the time of its construction.

The place is important in demonstrating the principal characteristics of a class of cultural or natural places/environments in New South Wales.

The superstructure is a representative example of a Federation Free Style public utility building. SP0067 is a representative example of a low level sewage pumping station on the Northern Suburbs Ocean Outfall Sewer and SPS technology.

== See also ==
- Australian non-residential architectural styles
