= Edward Macarthur =

British Army general

Lieutenant-General Sir Edward Macarthur KCB
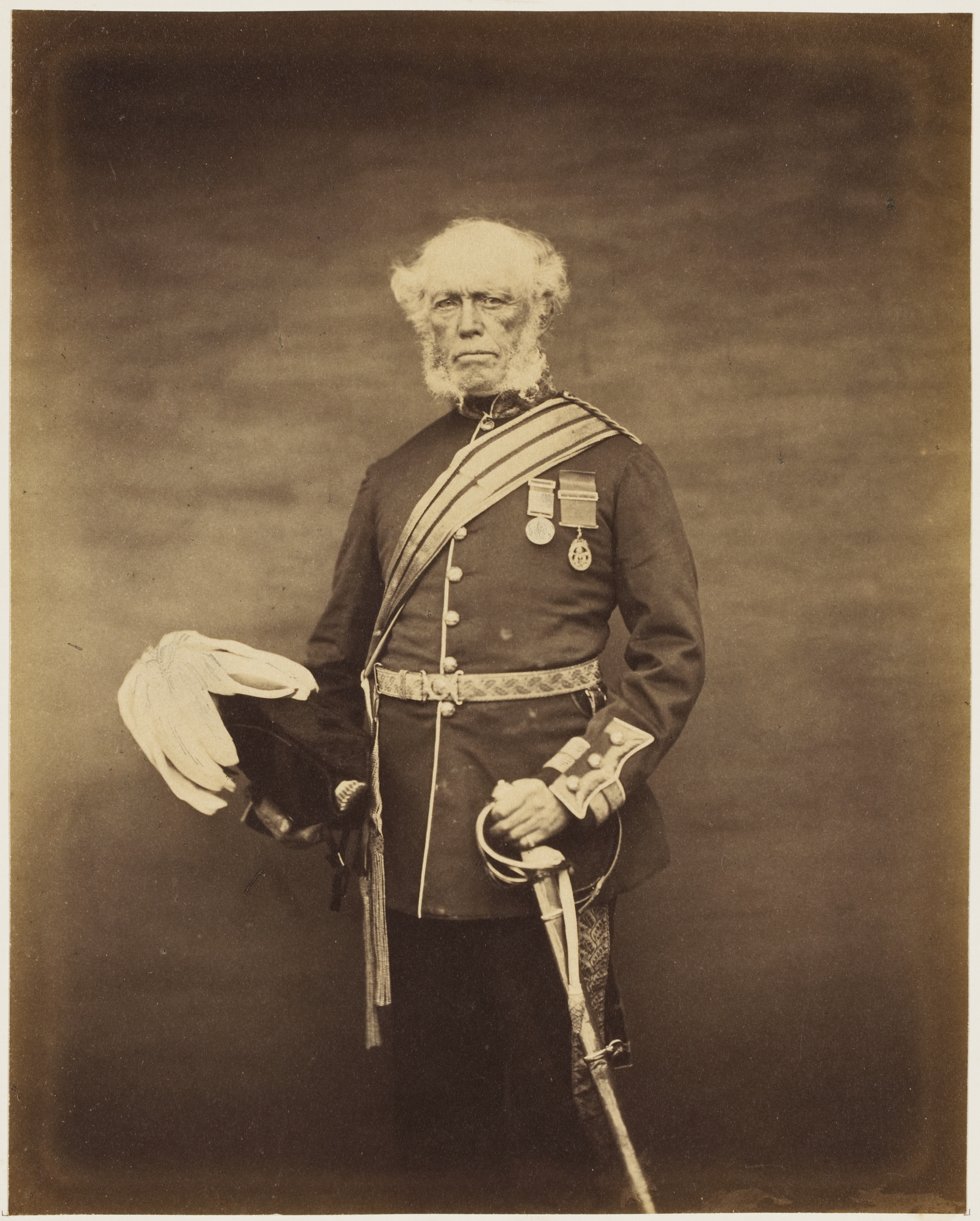
- Macarthur in c. 1858
- Born: 16 March 1789; Bath, Somerset, England
- Died: 4 January 1872 (aged 82); London, England
- Occupations: Lieutenant-general in the British Army, Commander-in-chief of British forces in Australia from 1855, an administrator in Australia
- Title: Knight Commander of the KCB
- Spouse: Sarah (daughter of Lieutenant-Colonel W. S. Neill) (1862—1872 (his death))
- Parent(s): John Macarthur, and his wife Elizabeth (née Veal)

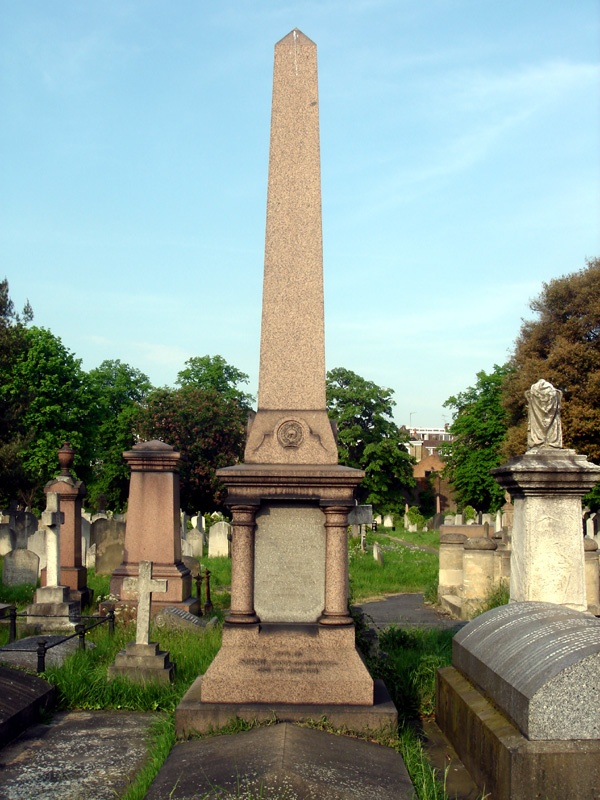
Funerary monument, Brompton Cemetery, London

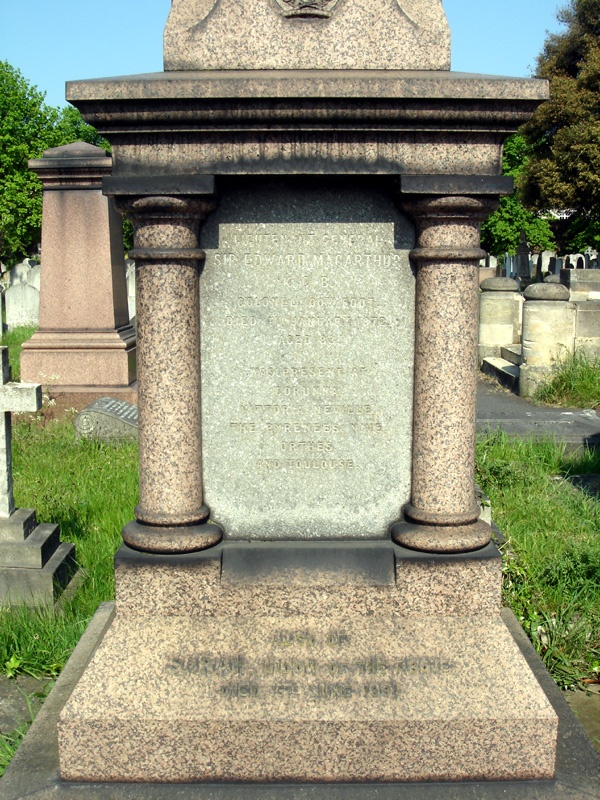
Funerary monument (detail), Brompton Cemetery, London

Lieutenant-General Sir Edward Macarthur KCB (16 March 1789 – 4 January 1872) was a lieutenant-general in the British Army, Commander-in-chief of British forces in Australia from 1855, and an administrator of the Colony of Victoria for 12 months, following the death of the Governor, Sir Charles Hotham.

== Early life ==
Macarthur was the eldest son of John Macarthur, and his wife Elizabeth (née Veal). He was born at Bath, Somerset, England, and arrived at Sydney with his parents in the ships Neptune and Scarborough in 1790, part of the Second Fleet. Edward Macarthur is believed to be the only passenger on those ships of whom a photograph exists, although taken later in life. In 1799, the young Edward was sent to England to be educated.

== Career ==
Macarthur returned to Australia in 1806, and took part with his father in the deposing of Governor William Bligh. In 1809, he was promoted to the rank of lieutenant. As part of the 39th Regiment he took part in the Duke of Wellington's campaigns in the Peninsular War and in France. In 1820 or 1829 he became a captain. In 1824 he paid a visit of 10 months to Australia as an agent of Thomas Potter Macqueen.

Edward Macarthur also promoted emigration in two small books: Colonial Policy of 1840 and 1841, as Illustrated by the Governor's Despatches, and the Proceedings of the Legislative Council of New South Wales (London, 1841) and Brief Remarks on Colonization (London, 1846). He was promoted to colonel in 1854.

On 5 December 1854, Macarthur travelled with the commander-in-chief of British forces in Australia, Major-General Sir Robert Nickle, to the site of the Eureka Rebellion. There they talked with the miners openly and, as a result of their investigations, Nickle advised the withdrawal of martial law. Macarthur was appointed commander-in-chief of British forces in Australia in 1855, to replace Nickle. On 1 January 1856, after the death of Governor of Victoria, Sir Charles Hotham, Macarthur was administrator of the colony of Victoria for 12 months.

== Late life ==
Macarthur returned to London in 1860. In 1862, he was created a Knight Commander of the KCB and, in the same year, was given the colonelcy of the 100th (Prince of Wales's Royal Canadian) Regiment of Foot, a position he held until his death.

He died in London on 4 January 1872 and was buried in Brompton Cemetery. In 1862, at the age of 73, he had married Sarah (daughter of Lieutenant-Colonel W. S. Neill), who survived him. There were no children.
