= Duck Creek (Clyde, New South Wales) =

River in New South Wales, Australia

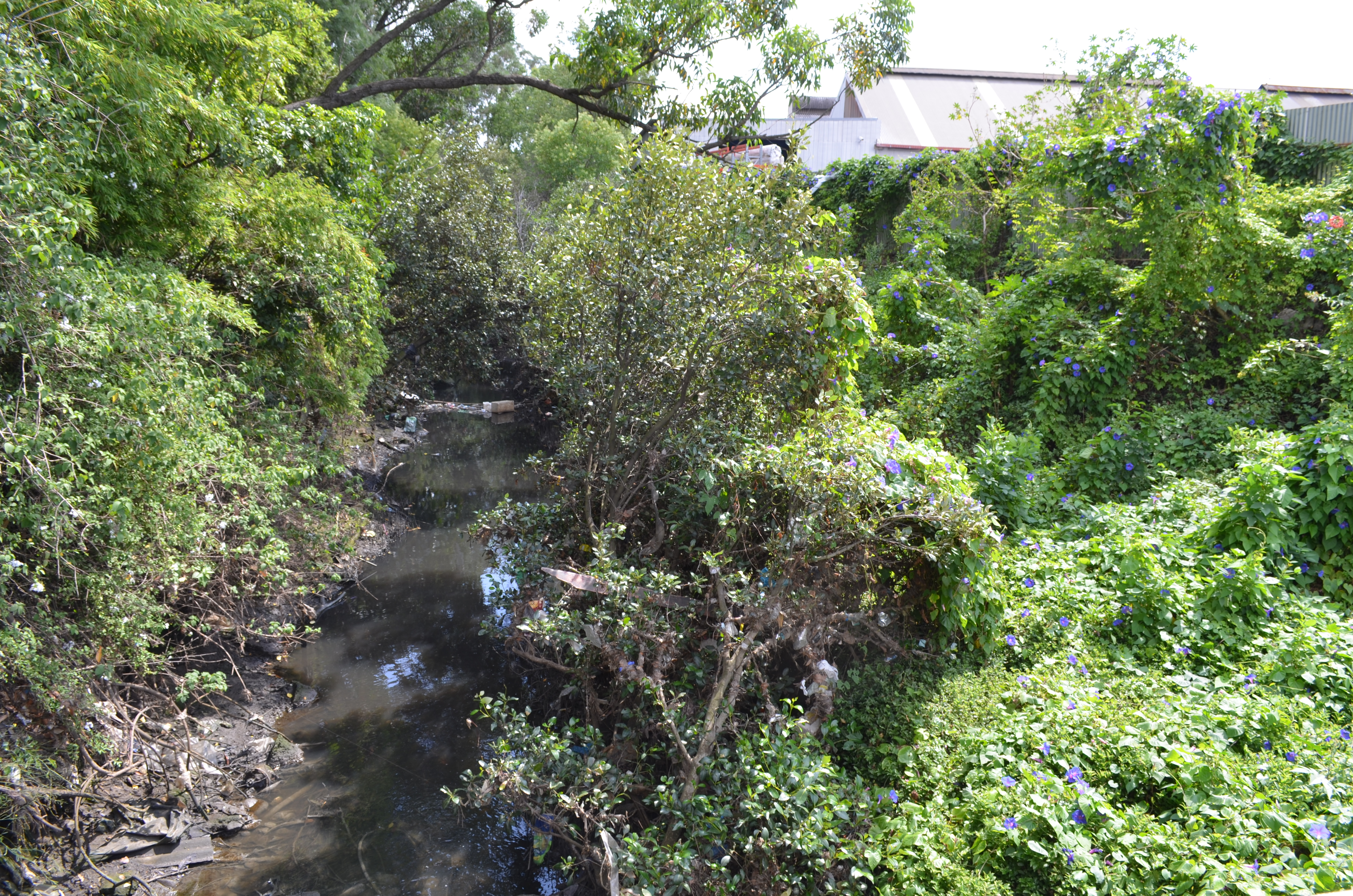
- A section of Duck Creek in Clyde, New South Wales

Location
- Country: Australia
- State: New South Wales
- Region: Sydney
- Municipalities: City of Parramatta, Cumberland Council

Physical characteristics
- Mouth: A'Becketts Creek
  - location: Clyde
  - coordinates: 33°49′46.9554″S 151°1′22.26″E

Basin features
- River system: Parramatta River catchment
- Tributaries
  - right: Little Duck Creek

Duck Creek is a perennial stream and a southern tributary of A'Becketts Creek and part of the Parramatta River catchment, in Sydney, New South Wales, Australia.

== Geography ==
Sections of its upper reaches in Guildford and Merrylands have been channelized and piped underground as it passes under roads, playing fields and through housing development. It then flows through the suburbs of Granville and Clyde where it joins with A'Becketts Creek. In its lower reaches it is a tidal creek.

== See also ==
- Duck River
- Parramatta River
- Port Jackson
