= Elizabeth Farm =

Historic estate in New South Wales, Australia

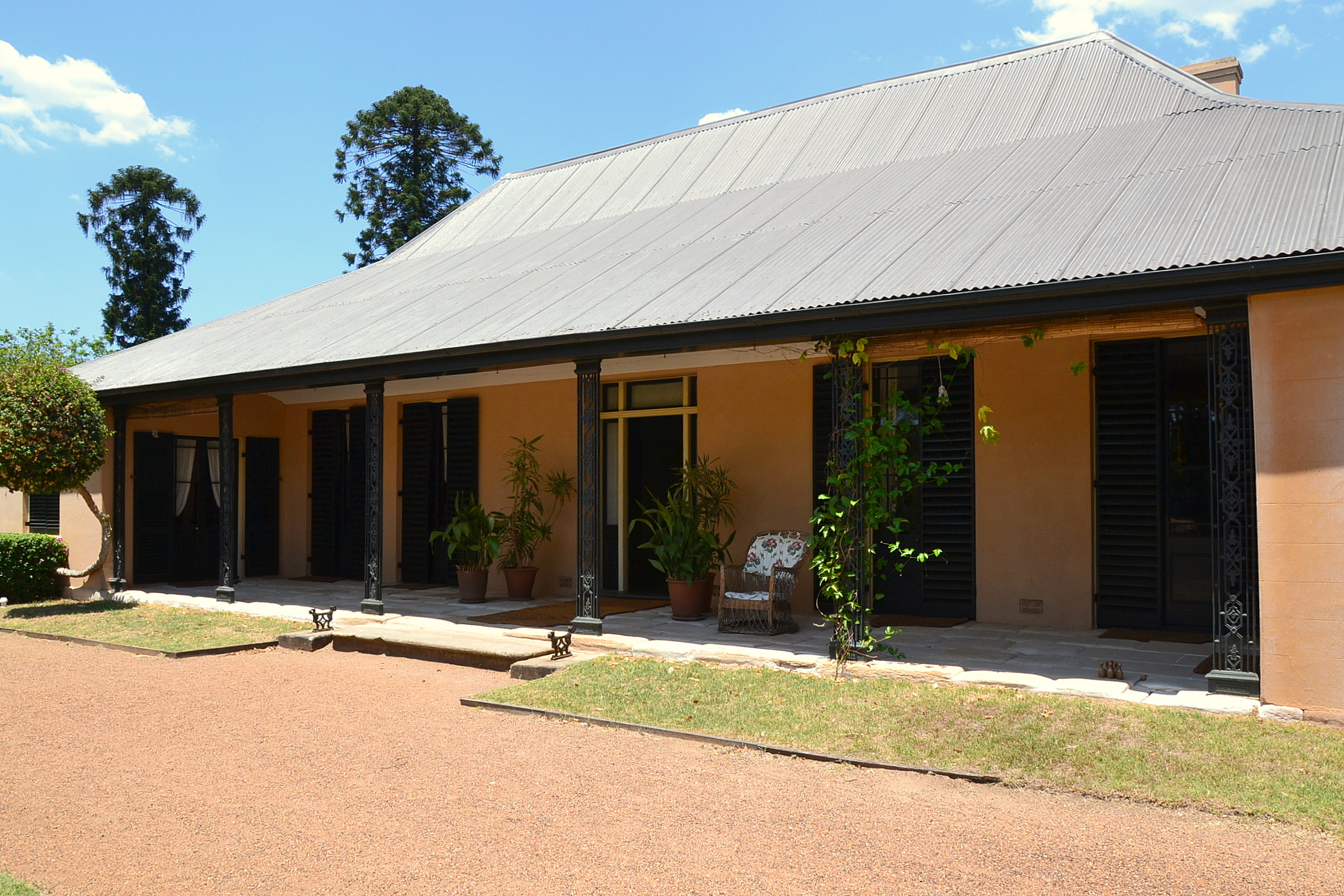
- Façade of Elizabeth Farm cottage

- Location within Sydney
- Etymology: Elizabeth Macarthur

General information
- Status: House museum, public park
- Type: Rural estate
- Architectural style: Australian Old Colonial
- Location: 70 Alice Street, Rosehill, New South Wales, Australia
- Coordinates: 33°49′17″S 151°01′04″E
- Completed: 1793
- Client: John Macarthur and his wife Elizabeth
- Owner: Museums of History NSW
- Landlord: Office of Environment and Heritage, Government of New South Wales

Design and construction
- Architects: Henry Cooper; John Verge

Website
- mhnsw.au/visit-us/elizabeth-farm/

New South Wales Heritage Register
- Official name: Elizabeth Farm
- Type: Private residence, farm, gardens
- Criteria: a., c., d., e., f.
- Designated: 2 April 1999
- Reference no.: 00001

Elizabeth Farm is a historic estate located at 70 Alice Street, Rosehill, a suburb of Sydney, New South Wales, Australia. Elizabeth Farm was the family home of wool pioneers John and Elizabeth Macarthur. The estate was commenced in 1793 on a slight hill overlooking the upper reaches of Parramatta River, 23 kilometres (14 mi) west of Sydney Cove. The Burramattagal clan of the Dharug people are the traditional custodians of the area; their presence is recalled in the name Parramatta.

The small, solid three-roomed brick cottage in the Australian Old Colonial style was transformed, by the late 1820s, into a smart country house, surrounded by "pleasure grounds", orchards and almost 400 hectares (1,000 acres) of semi-cleared land. Enveloped within later extensions, the early cottage remains intact, making it Australia's oldest surviving European dwelling. The estate is managed by Museums of History NSW as a museum that is open to the public for a modest fee.

On 2 April 1999 the estate was listed on the New South Wales State Heritage Register, the first property entered on the register.

== History ==
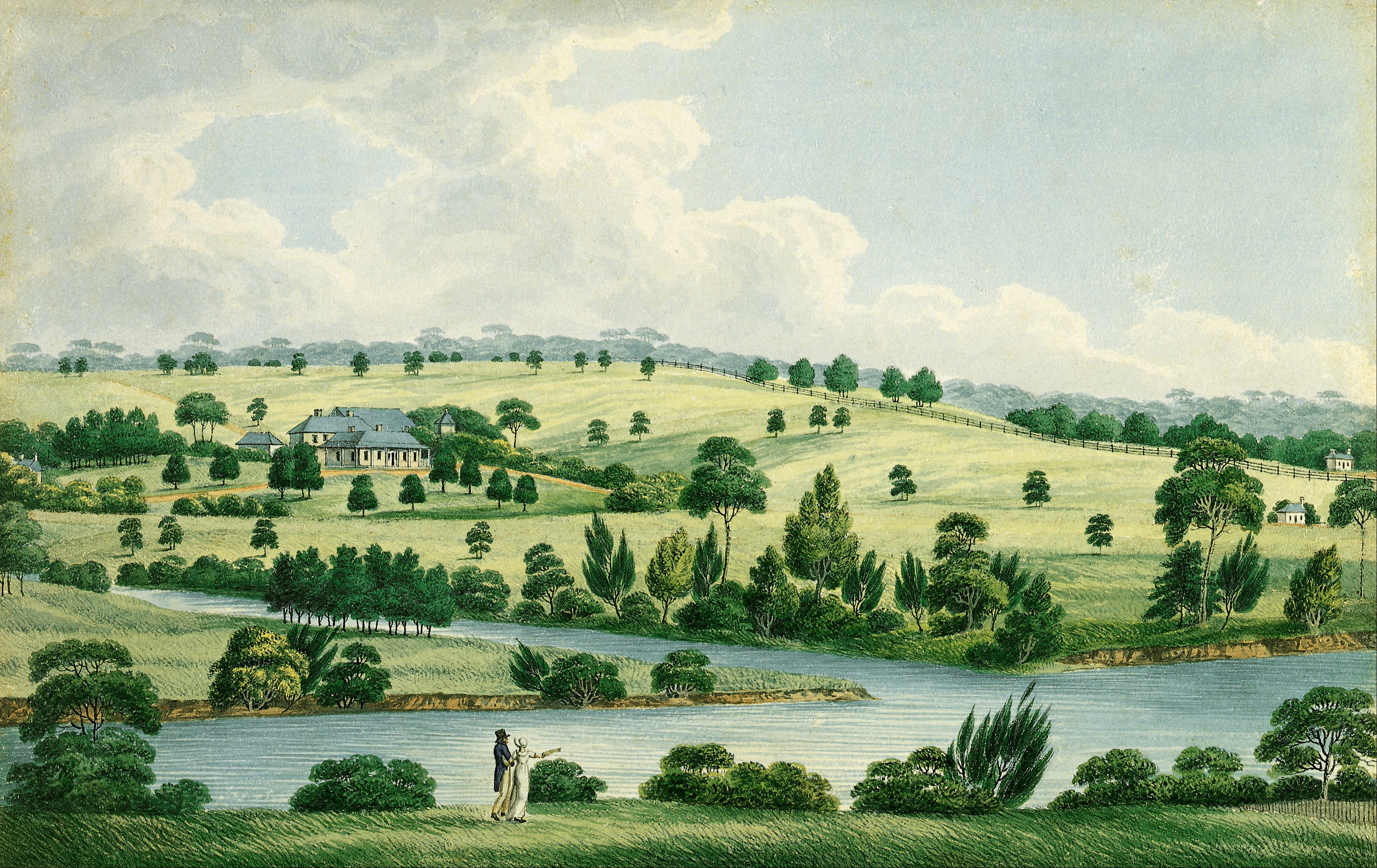
Romanticised painting of Elizabeth Farm viewed from the northern riverbank of Parramatta River. Joseph Lycett based this on sketches and his memories and painted it on his return to England.

Elizabeth and John Macarthur arrived in 1790 with the Second Fleet. They brought contemporary ideas that formed the basis of their house and garden. In 1793 Governor Grose granted Macarthur 100 acres (40 ha) near Parramatta on the west side of "Tipperary Farm". This area would increase to 925 acres (374 ha) through grants and purchases by 1818 and proved to be almost 1,100 acres (450 ha) when surveyed in 1881.

The building of Elizabeth Farm commenced in 1793. It was a brick single-storey building with four rooms, a hall, closets, and a cellar with an adjoining kitchen, servants' apartments and other necessary offices. It remained the Macarthur family residence and Elizabeth's home until she died in 1850. The Macarthurs occupied and continually extended the house grant as their family increased to nine children and their financial position grew. Around 1805 a bedroom behind the drawing room and verandahs was added. The second kitchen was built in 1830.

From 1794 Macarthur became interested in raising sheep and began to crossbreed his flock at Elizabeth Farm selectively. The house was the scene of political and social activity including visits from many governors and their wives. Elizabeth managed the farm and their other properties while John was in England.

In his last twelve years, Macarthur consulted pattern books and various architects and builders such as Henry Cooper and James Smith to prepare building plans.

John Macarthur brought olive trees (Olea europaea cv.) to Sydney in 1805 and again in 1817. Although George Suttor had introduced olives to Australia earlier, in 1800 among a collection of plants from Sir Joseph Banks, these appear not to have survived. Macarthur's olives did. John, in exile in London over his involvement with the overthrow of Governor William Bligh, sensed the mood of the British administration – who were encouraged by Suttor's reports that New South Wales had potential for horticulture due to the local climate. Macarthur set off in 1815 on a tour of France and Switzerland to study "the whole practice of the culture of the vine and the olive, and the making of the wine and the oil." By May 1816 he was back in London with a collection of vines and olives for shipment to Australia. He was certain that these would impress Lord Bathurst, secretary of state for the colonies, and assist his return to Australia, but it took a year to get the go-ahead. He arrived in September 1817 with a cargo of "useful plants" including two olives from Provence.

Five years later Macarthur made an equally favourable impression on Commissioner John Bigge who was in NSW to investigate all aspects of colonial administration, including the development of agriculture and trade. Bigge observed that Macarthur's olive trees had assimilated well to the climate and that olive oil from NSW could prove a successful export product. The settlement's British cultural background lacked experience growing olives commercially and competition from the wool production industry kept olive production in the shade. Two olive trees remain at Elizabeth Farm on the front (northern) lawn. It is unclear whether these date from 1805 or 1817 introductions. However, they appear to be the earliest olive trees surviving in Australia and thus, despite Suttor's introduction in 1800, Macarthur could be credited with introducing or at least successfully establishing olives in Australia, leading (at least in the late 20th century) to a growing agricultural industry.

In the 1820s Macarthur added a separate two-storey section to the rear and built stables. The house additions used open planning with French doors leading to the verandahs and gardens. A few years later the verandahs may have been remodelled. A Doric columned north verandah in contrast to the treillage of the eastern verandah was added in 1826. Further extensions were made during 1826 and 1827, designed by Henry Cooper. Refacing of the servant's quarters, possibly by John Verge, took place sometime around 1833. In this year John Macarthur moved to their property at Camden and died there in 1834.

In 1872 Edward Macarthur died leaving Elizabeth Farm to his niece Elizabeth Onslow, the daughter of his brother James, but allowing his wife Sarah a lifetime interest in it.

The Macarthur family sold Elizabeth Farm Estate in 1881. From 1852 Elizabeth Farm was occupied by various tenants and agents, including William Billyard, Crown Solicitor of NSW from 1875 until 1883.

The new owner, Septimus Stephen, subdivided the land and put the house block up for auction. There were further subdivisions in 1884. The house was leased variously as a boarding house and glue factory. It was purchased as a house and six acres by William and Elizabeth Swann and family in 1904 for the land value only. The house was in a state of dilapidation. They immediately proceeded to have it cleansed, disinfected and repaired. The family became an institution in Parramatta, their house-based activities including music, education, a secretarial school and dental surgery. The Swann family owned and occupied the house until 1968 when it was purchased by the Elizabeth Farm Management Trust.

A Friends of Elizabeth Farm group formed well before the formation of the Historic Houses Trust of New South Wales.

In 1973 the State Planning Authority assumed control of Elizabeth Farm. Between 1978 and 1983 the Public Works Department and the Heritage Council of NSW restored the buildings, which were considered important as a record of the oldest surviving examples of colonial construction techniques in Australia.

Architectural documentation and conservation works on the buildings were supervised by project architect Ian Sansom, Government Architect's Branch. Conservation policy and landscape proposals for the garden and grounds were developed by the Landscape Section, Government Architect's Branch, in consultation with the Historic Houses Trust (HHT) and Heritage and Conservation Branch.

A. W. Edwards P/L was engaged to restore lath and plaster work. A detailed property title search was carried out. Anne Bickford, an archaeologist was engaged to continue research, particularly regarding the carriageway and former outbuildings. Discussions continued with the HHT regarding its likely requirements for ancillary facilities on the site. Consultation continued with Parramatta City Council regarding the future management of the reserve surrounding Elizabeth Farm.

A draft conservation plan was prepared by the HHT in 1982. The HC SR Committee formed a sub-committee with representatives of the Heritage & Conservation Branch, HHT and co-opted members to increase the involvement of the HHT in works being carried out with a view to the eventual transfer of the property to the Trust for management as a house museum.

The site was transferred to the Historic Houses Trust of NSW in 1983 and opened to the public as a house museum in 1984. Since then the Friends of the Historic Houses Trust has raised funds to allow entry display refurbishment, lighting and iPad interpretation ($38,000), soft-furnishings ($33,000) and reproduction of Elizabeth Macarthur's ivory workbox ($8000) as well as organising and supporting the successful annual Festival of the Oliv

== Description ==
Elizabeth Farm House is a single-storey late 18th century English vernacular cottage with a pair of sash windows either side of the front door and four box-like rooms. Extensions since the initial building phase have increased the number of rooms The walls are hand pressed clay bricks rendered and coursed to simulate stone. Ironbark floors and cedar joinery complement the plaster walls. The original shingled hipped roof is continuous over the front verandah which is now clad with corrugated iron and supported by cast iron columns. The garden contains many trees planted by Elizabeth Macarthur, araucarias, kurrajongs, a Chinese elm and a pair of olive trees.

Elizabeth Farm comprises three connecting buildings - the main house, a rendered brick verandahed bungalow with shingled roof under painted galvanised iron, single storeyed kitchen wing, two cellars and a two storeyed servants quarters with dairy and laundry on almost one hectare of land. It is bounded by Alice Street and the Elizabeth Farm Reserve adjoining Alice, Alfred and Arthur Streets, Parramatta near the Parramatta River. A timber shed (the remains of outbuildings) purpose built tearooms and amenities block are subsidiary structures. test

It was reported to be in good physical condition, with medium archaeological potential, as at 24 March 2016. Elizabeth Farm House has a relative intactness of form, interior spaces and detailing pre-dating 1834.

=== Modifications and dates ===
- 1807 – Construction of a kitchen cellar
- 1810 – Stone kitchen and cellars built underneath
- 1820s – House remodelled and some walls rebuilt
- 1826 – Doric columned north verandah added
- 1827 – Dining Room and pantries altered
- 1832 – Walls painted and chimney pieces put into the dining room and bedroom
- c. 1833 – Verge refinished walls and ceilings
- 1860s – Verandah posts changed from timber to iron
- 1865 – Contents removed
- 1880 – House in untenable condition
- 1883 – First subdivision of Elizabeth Farm
- 1884 – Second subdivision of Elizabeth Farm
- 1904 – House cleansed, disinfected, and repaired
- 1978–1983 – House restored and most alterations made after the Macarthur ownership removed
- October 2010 – large bunya pine, planted by Macarthur in 1870s, collapsed on tea rooms
- October 2011 – Rebuilt café reopens with new interiors

== Museum ==
The homestead, now a house museum, is creatively furnished with props and copies of objects known to belong to the Macarthurs of Elizabeth Farm. Impressive cedar joinery has been restored while carefully reproduced paint schemes, fabrics and floor coverings provide an authentic impression of this early 19th-century household. The Macarthur's garden of native and exotic ornamentals, fruit trees and vegetables has been recreated around original plantings and archaeological features dating to the early 19th century.

Avoiding the use of rope barriers and screens, an innovative 'hands on' approach encourages visitors to explore and interact with this evocative historical environment: sitting in chairs, leafing through letters, playing the piano or pulling up beside an open fire. Elizabeth Farm is open to the general public.

== Heritage listing ==
Elizabeth Farm is associated with major figures who were prominent in the 19th century development of the colony, including John and Elizabeth Macarthur, and the Swann family in the 20th century. There is a large surviving collection of documentary evidence connected to the house, which contains part of the oldest surviving European construction in Australia. The garden contains some of the earliest European plantings in Australia including a Chinese elm (Ulmus parvifolia), 1805-planted olive (Olea europaea), kurrajong (Brachychiton populneus), bunya pine (Araucaria bidwillii) and hoop pine (Araucaria cunninghamii). It is an example of early colonial architecture and early agricultural experiments.

The property forms the core of a major historic farm estate which was highly influential in the development of the wool industry in Australia, the introduction and acclimatisation of plants and economic crops such as olives and vines. By its size, location and history of subdivision the property was influential on the development of the town of Parramatta.

The property is also significant in the history of conservation in NSW, being the first to be preserved by direct acquisition by the State Government, and the second property to have a permanent conservation order placed over it under the Heritage Act 1977.

Elizabeth Farm was listed on the New South Wales State Heritage Register on 2 April 1999 having satisfied the following criteria.

- The place is important in demonstrating the course, or pattern, of cultural or natural history in New South Wales.

Elizabeth Farm is significant because of its association with major figures, in particular Elizabeth and John Macarthur, who were prominent in the early 19th century agricultural, political, cultural and architectural development of the colony. It was the centre of an estate on which some of the first experiments in pastoral and agricultural land use in Australia took place, particularly in the early development of the wool industry. It is associated with the Swann family for over sixty years, including their preservation of the buildings. The farm house is part of a group of early colonial buildings (including Old Government House, Hambledon Cottage and Experiment Farm) which reflect Parramatta's importance as an early agricultural area and as the second most important settlement in the colony. The house's range of building styles reflect the adaption of traditional European architecture to the prevailing Australian climate. The house is a record of the architectural ideas and ambitions of the colony's first fifty years. The house shows growth from a vernacular cottage to a comfortable family home with some sophisticated detailing, all reflecting the development of colonial life. The house is representative of the work of architects Henry Cooper and John Verge.

- The place is important in demonstrating aesthetic characteristics and/or a high degree of creative or technical achievement in New South Wales.

The house is one of the most evocative houses relating to the earliest period of Australian European history and is one of the most aesthetically pleasing of colonial bungalows.

- The place has strong or special association with a particular community or cultural group in New South Wales for social, cultural or spiritual reasons.

The farm has strong links with the Parramatta community.

- The place has potential to yield information that will contribute to an understanding of the cultural or natural history of New South Wales.

The garden contains remnants of some of the earliest European plantings in Australia, including the European Olive. Older indigenous species include kurrajong and bunya bunya and hoop pines. The farm has a large surviving collection of original documentary evidence relating to the house and its occupants, and the existence of some of the earliest provenanced furniture. The house is an example of the development of Australian building methods in the late 18th and early 19th centuries.

- The place possesses uncommon, rare or endangered aspects of the cultural or natural history of New South Wales.

The Elizabeth Farm house is part of the oldest surviving construction in Australia and a rare survival of the earliest period of colonial architecture.

== See also ==
- Experiment Farm Cottage
- List of heritage houses in Sydney
