= Rosehill, New South Wales =

Suburb in New South Wales

Rosehill
- Suburb
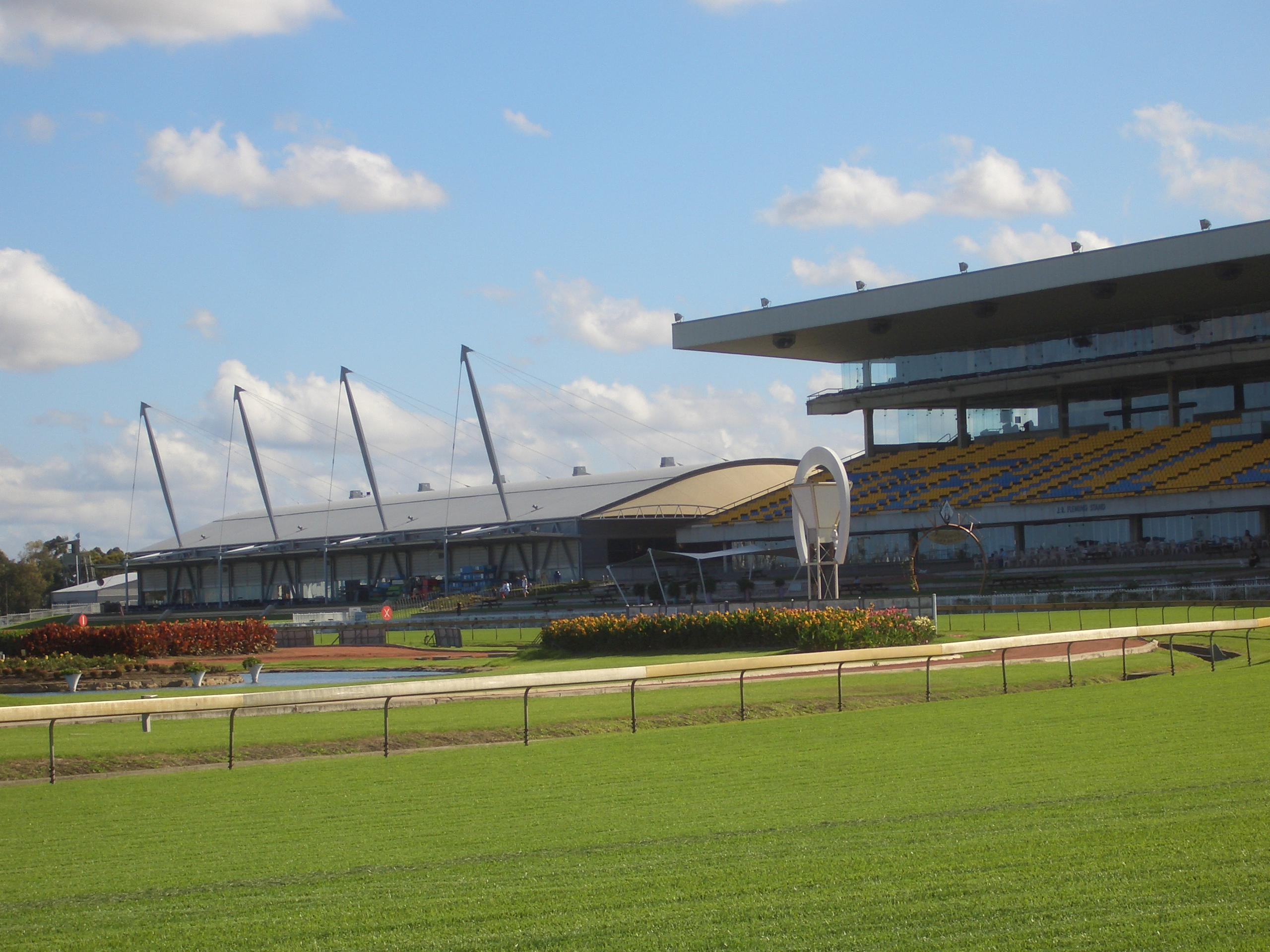
- Rosehill Racecourse

- Interactive map of Rosehill
- Country: Australia
- State: New South Wales
- City: Sydney
- LGA: City of Parramatta
- Location: 18 km (11 mi) west of Sydney CBD

Government
  - Federal division: Parramatta

Area
  - Total: 3.7 km^{2} (1.4 sq mi)
- Elevation: 8 m (26 ft)

Population
  - Total: 4,047 (SAL 2021)
- Postcode: 2142
Suburbs around Rosehill
| Parramatta | Camellia | Rydalmere |
| Harris Park | Rosehill | Silverwater |
| Granville | Clyde | Auburn |

Rosehill is a suburb of Sydney, in the state of New South Wales, Australia. Located 18 kilometres west of the Sydney central business district in the local government area of the City of Parramatta, Rosehill is part of the Greater Western Sydney region.

Rosehill shares the postcode of 2142 with the separate suburbs of Granville, South Granville, Holroyd and Camellia.

Rosehill contains a mixture of residential, commercial, industrial and recreational land.

== History ==
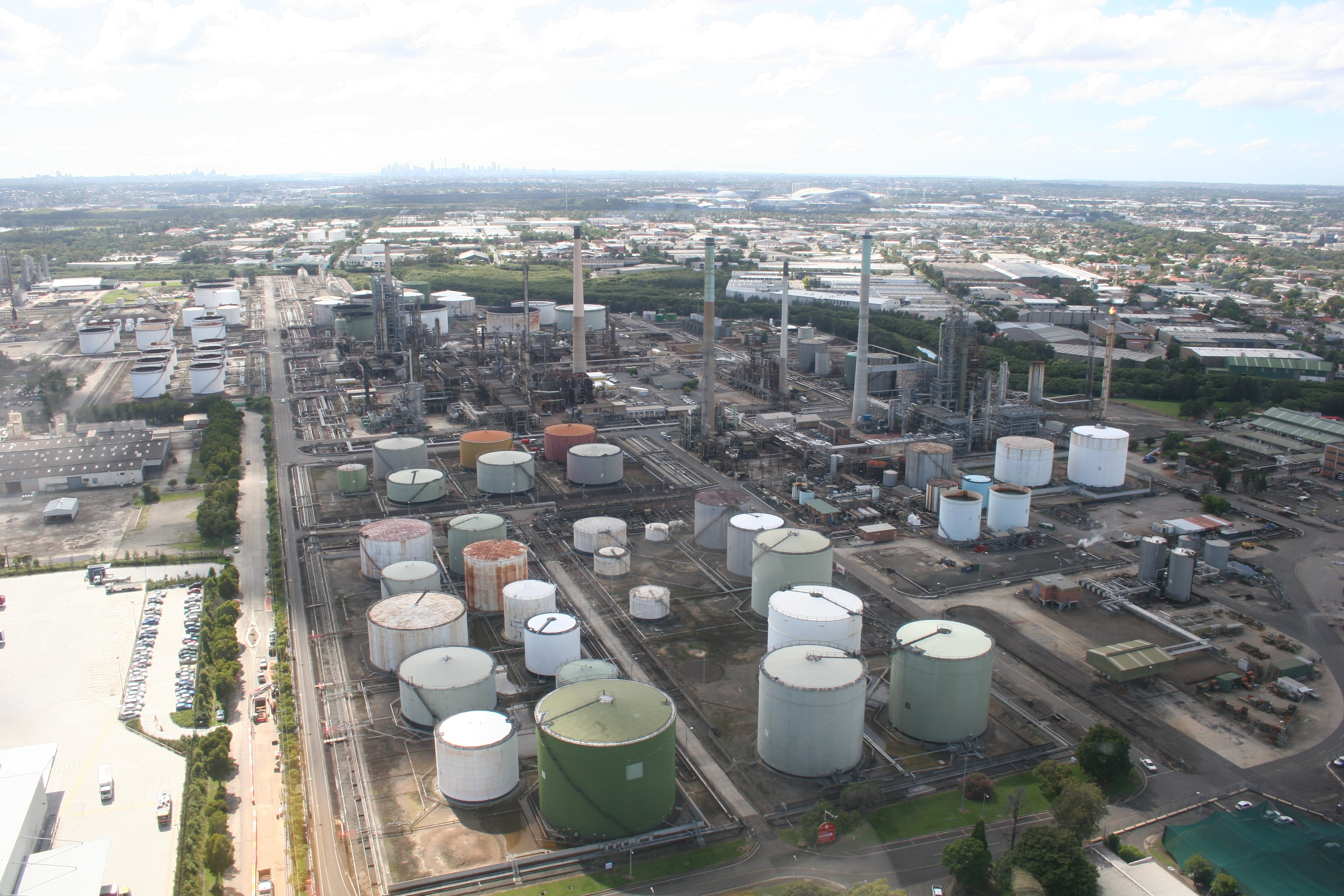
Industrial land at Rosehill

In the early days of the colony, the hill behind old Government House had been named "Rose Hill" by Governor Arthur Phillip, before the suburb had been named Parramatta.

On 25 March 1789, Henry Dodd took charge of a farm established at Rose Hill. James Ruse came to farm there in November of the same year. In December 1790, a crop of corn (wheat), described as "exceeding good," was harvested at Rose Hill. By 1791, 200 acres of land had been cleared and were in production.

Nearly a hundred years later in 1883, 850 acres (3.4 km^{2}) of John Macarthur's Elizabeth Farm were subdivided for industrial purposes. Part of the estate was set aside for a recreation area, which became Rosehill Racecourse.

Rosehill Railway Station opened in 1888 as part of the Carlingford railway line, which was privately owned until it was taken over by the state government in 1904. The station closed with the line in January 2020.

Rosehill Racecourse is currently served by the Rosehill Gardens tram stop, opened in 2024 as part of the Parramatta Light Rail. The stop is located on the site of the former Camellia railway station.

In December 2023, the state government proposed for the site of Rosehill Racecourse to be redeveloped for new housing and the construction of a new metro station. These plans were rejected by the Australian Turf Club in May 2025.

== Heritage listings ==
Rosehill has a number of heritage-listed sites, including:

- 60 Prospect Street: Camden
- 62 Prospect Street: Comfort Lodge
- 70 Alice Street: Elizabeth Farm
- Arthur Street: Elizabeth Farm Reserve

== Landmarks ==
- Rosehill Gardens Racecourse hosts some of the most important events on the Australian horse racing calendar, including the prestigious Golden Slipper.
- Historic Elizabeth Farm was the home of wool pioneer, John Macarthur
- Mercure Sydney Parramatta Hotel, formerly Travelodge Rosehill

== Education ==
- Rosehill Public School

== Population ==
At the 2021 census, Rosehill recorded a population of 4,047. Of these:

- The age distribution was unusual, with a preponderance of younger adults compared to the country in general, but similar to the neighbouring suburb of Silverwater. The median age was 32 years, compared to the national median of 38 years. There was a large concentration of people between 20 and 34 years of age; they made up 35.5% of residents (the national average was 20.5%). Children aged 0–14 years made up 19.1% of the population (the national average was 18.2%) and people aged 65 years and over made up only 6.0% of the population (the national average was 17.2%).
- 30.3% of people were born in Australia; the next most common countries of birth included India 30.0%, China (excluding Special Administrative Regions and Taiwan) 5.9%, Lebanon 3.1% Pakistan 2.9%, and the Philippines 2.7%. Over three-quarters (79.9%) of residents had both parents born overseas. 25.5% of people only spoke English at home; other languages spoken at home included Gujarati 10.0%, Arabic 7.4%, Hindi 7.3%, Mandarin 6.8%, and Punjabi 4.9%.
- The most common responses for religion included Hinduism 29.7%, No Religion 17.1%, Catholic 16.9%, and Islam 10.1%; a further 6.7% of respondents for this area elected not to disclose their religious status.
- 6.7% of the work-force was unemployed, above the national average of 5.1%.
- Almost two-thirds (63.0%) of households were family households and 29.8% were single person households. 73.3% of occupied private residences were flats, units or apartments, 17.2% were separate houses and 8.6% were semi-detached, 67.6% were rented, 20.0% were owned with a mortgage and 9.0% were owned outright.
