= Colin Loxton =

Australian cricketer (1914–2000)

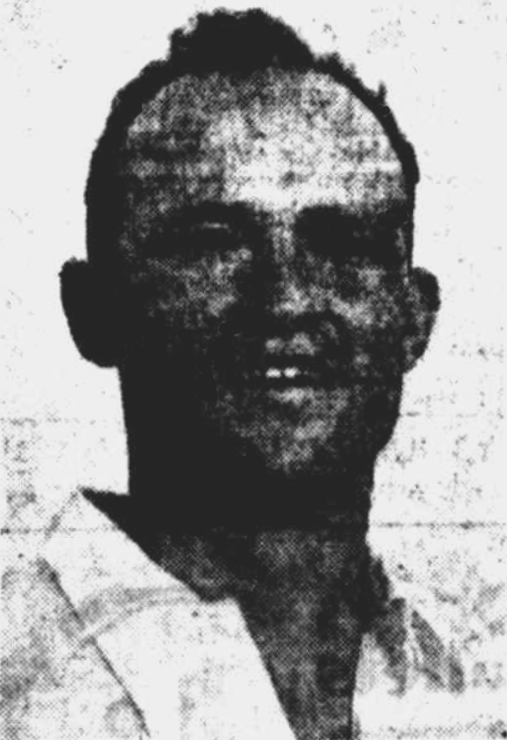

Personal information
- Born: 1 January 1914; Beecroft, New South Wales, Australia
- Died: 2 September 2000 (aged 86); Brisbane, Queensland, Australia
- Source: Cricinfo, 5 October 2020

Colin Loxton (1 January 1914 – 2 September 2000) was an Australian cricketer who was an all-rounder who was an aggressive batsman and fast-medium bowler. He played in one first-class match for Cambridge University in 1935 and four matches for Queensland in 1937/38.

== Cricket career ==
Loxton began playing cricket while attending the Melbourne Church of England Grammar School and after graduating he studied law at Cambridge University for three years, representing the university side once scoring 36* and taking 3 for 55. He also performed well enough in hurdles to be awarded a Blue for athletics. He arrived back in Australia in 1936 and joined University in the Brisbane Grade Cricket competition, and quickly established himself as a player scoring 502 runs at an average of 38.61 in the 1936/37 Grade cricket season.

Loxton's form persisted into the 1937/38 season and in October 1937 he captained the Queensland Colts side and in December he was selected in the Queensland First-class side to tour the southern states. He did not perform well in his First-class games however he was likely ill during the tour as he was operated on for appendicitis shortly after arriving back in Queensland. His State career was cut short as in April 1938 he was transferred to a Wellington branch in his career and had to move to New Zealand.

In November 1939 Loxton joined the Australian Air Force and went to Point Cook where he became a pilot officer. In 1940 he married Cynthia Thorpe, an air hostess on the Brisbane-Sydney route, in Melbourne. In 1952 Loxton returned to Brisbane and conducted a coaching program for University cricketers hoping to improve the standard of Varsity cricket.

== See also ==
- List of Queensland first-class cricketers
