= Thomas Pollard Sampson =

Australian architect

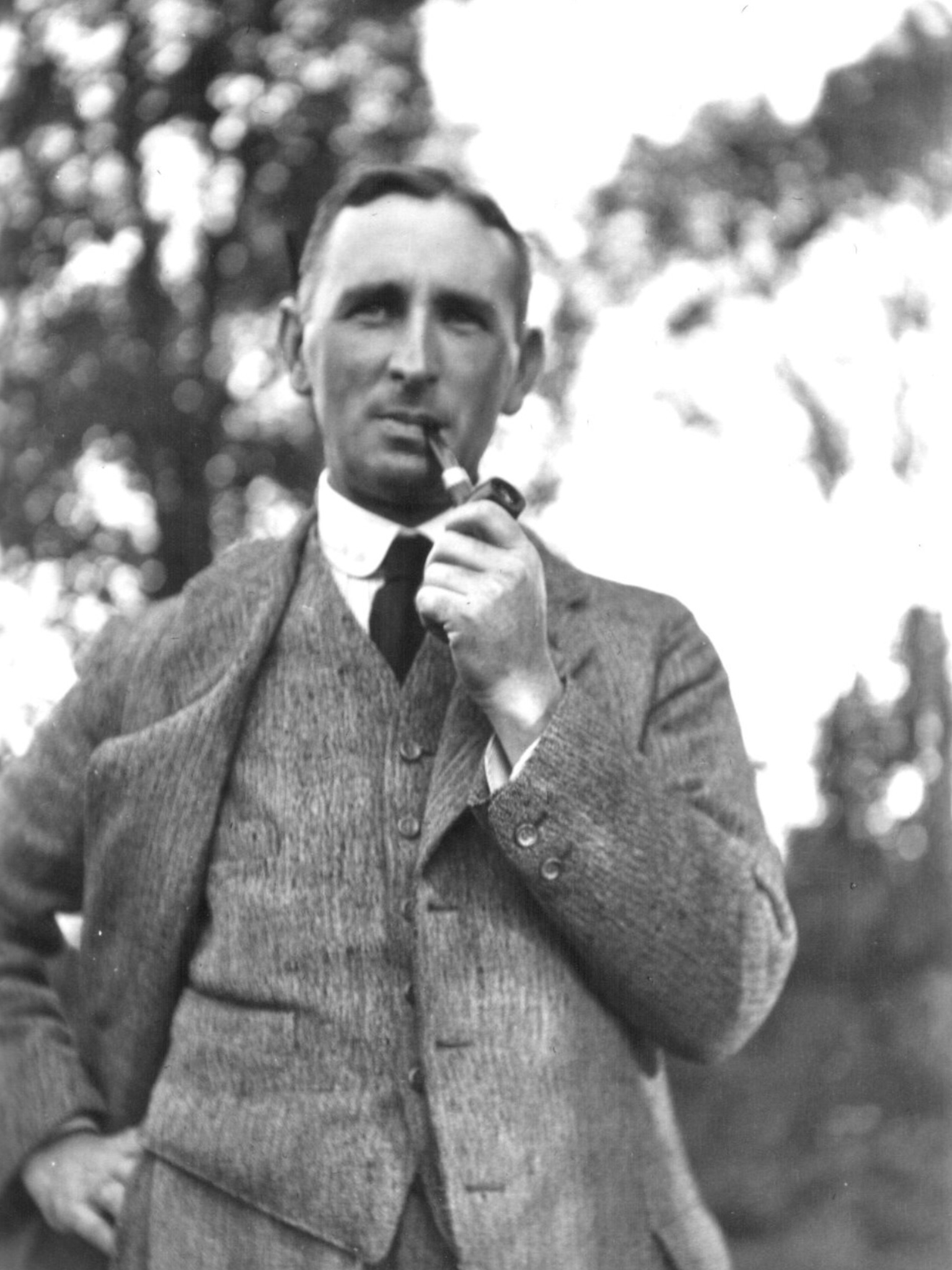
- Born: 24 June 1875; Launceston, Tasmania, Australia
- Died: 25 June 1961 (aged 86); Paddington, New South Wales, Australia
- Other name: T. P. Sampson
- Education: Launceston High School
- Occupation: Architect
- Known for: Architecture
- Spouse: Clarice Effie Henderson
- Children: 1
- Relatives: Senator Burford Sampson cousin

Thomas Pollard Sampson (24 June 1875 – 25 June 1961) was an Australian architect active in New South Wales during the first forty years of the 20th century. His work encompassed the styles of the Federation Arts and Crafts and Bungalow through to the Inter-War Styles. In 1912 he designed an octagonal roofed stadium at Rushcutters Bay that seated up to 12,000 spectators. At the time, the Sydney Stadium was said to be "the largest roofed-in structure in the world." In the 1920s and 1930s, as a golfer and member of Concord Golf Club and Pennant Hills Golf Club, he designed the clubhouses at both courses. The buildings of both these Sydney clubs are still in use in 2023.

== Family and life ==
Sampson was born in Launceston, Tasmania, to Richard Sampson (c.1847–1917) and Caroline Elizabeth Pollard (1849–1945). His maternal grandparents were from Yorkshire, England, and his extended family were members of the Methodist Church. He attended the independent school known as Launceston High School that existed from 1884 until 1912. It was founded by Edward Alleyne Nathan who had been a teacher at Launceston Church Grammar School. The school was at Milton Hall in Frederick Street, Launceston, and eventually merged with Launceston Church Grammar School. The alumni of both schools held joint reunions as the Old Launcestonians' Association after the schools merger and Sampson attended these reunions in Sydney.

On moving to Sydney in 1909, Sampson lived in Manly and for a short period in Kirribilli. He married Clarice Henderson on 17 February 1911 at St Philip's Church, Sydney and after the wedding the young couple lived at the Henderson family home Youngarra in Gordon Street, Burwood. Sampson and his wife had one daughter, Phyllis (Phyl) Marjorie Sampson, who was born on 8 August 1911 in Sydney. The Sampson family then rented a house at 47 Ashburner Street, Manly, in the 1920s. From the 1930s, until his death, Sampson lived in a flat at Craigievar in Darling Point. He died on 25 Jun 1961 at the Scottish Hospital in Paddington.

In February 1932, at Woollahra, his daughter Phyl married Paul Cohen a son of Sir Samuel and Lady Cohen. The marriage produced twins, Christopher and Dinah Cohen. In 1941, Paul Cohen changed his Jewish name and those of his family to Cullen. He was fighting the Germans in North Africa, Greece and Crete and knew that, were he captured he would not be treated as a Prisoner of War. The marriage ended in divorce in 1961. Phyl Cullen died on 22 October 2011 in Elizabeth Bay, New South Wales, aged 100 years.

== Career ==
Sampson was articled in architecture to A.E. Luttrell of Cameron Street, Launceston In 1891 Sampson exhibited an architectural drawing of a design for a villa residence in the Tasmanian Industrial Exhibition. He had been articled for six months at that time and had become an architectural photographer taking many notable images of Launceston buildings. Sampson moved to Sydney to practise as an architect. In 1907 he designed a row of three houses in Manly, New South Wales. In 1911 Charles A Henderson offered his son-law land on his subdivision at Strathfield. Sampson designed houses and rented them before selling the properties. In 1919 he partnered with Harold Minton Taylor, a solicitor, and purchased Rosebank House and adjoining land in Darlinghurst. They demolished the original house and constructed several apartment blocks in the suburb commencing with Upton Court in Forbes Street. The developers then moved on to Farrell Avenue and built Richmond Hall, Rosebank Hall and Montrose. All four blocks of apartments are still standing in 2025. Sampson also designed the buildings for Henderson's Hats at Surry Hills and Rosebery. Whilst living with the Henderson family his daughter started school at Meriden where Sampson did a substantial amount of work on the school's Redmyre Road campus in Strathfield. He was also involved in the marketing of a subdivision of land at Neutral Bay. Sampson worked with other architects early in his career including Herbert Dennis, Robertson & Marks and Nixon & Adam. After designing the stadium for Hugh D. McIntosh he worked on his home, Belhaven in Bellevue Hill and on investment properties for him. In 1924 Sampson designed a house at 3 Nicholson Street, Burwood, for Charles David Murray (1872–1936) who had just become managing director of Murray and Company Ltd, Universal Providers. It was one of three substantial homes, on the northern and high point of the street, that had tennis courts and orchards. The Murray house and its neighbours were all demolished in the 1970s for the creation of St. Paul’s Close, Burwood. The replacement houses are all in Late twentieth century Australian and immigrants’ nostalgic style. During World War Two Sampson worked for Manpower Directorate (Australia) and did early work at Concord Repatriation General Hospital. After his daughter's marriage into the Cohen family Sampson worked for them designing houses in Woollahra and office buildings in Sydney.

== Notable works ==
- R.C. Henderson Hat Manufactures, wharehouse and office, 11–13 Randle Street Surry Hills (1912 burnt out and demolished 2023)
- Austral Hotel Victoria Street, Darlinghurst (Kings Cross) (1912) alterations and additions demolished in 1936 and replaced by the Piccadilly Hotel
- Sydney Stadium Neild Avenue, Rushcutters Bay. (1912, demolished 1970)
- Kama 16 Llandilo Avenue, Strathfield (1913)
- House 105 Bower Street Manly (1914)
- Romahapa 22–24 Martin Road, Centennial Park (1914)
- Villa Regina Ben Boyd Road, Neutral Bay (1915 demolished 1969 and replaced by a row of Meriton townhouses)
- Houses 86, 88 and 90 Beresford Road, Bellevue Hill (1914)
- House 11 Kingsland Avenue, Strathfield, New South Wales (1915)
- Commonwealth Hotel 461 Elizabeth Street, Surry Hills (1919, facade only remains)
- Upton Court 12 residential flats, 186 Forbes Street, Darlinghurst (1919)
- Concord Golf Club Clubhouse, Concord (1921)
- Richmond Hall 11 residential flats, 2-4 Farrell Avenue, Darlinghurst (1922)
- Rosebank Hall 26 residential flats, 6-8 Farrell Avenue, Darlinghurst (1922)
- Montrose 9 residential flats, 10-12 Farrell Avenue, Darlinghurst (1922)
- Derwent 117 Homebush Road, Strathfield (1924)
- Murray House 3 Nicholson Street, Burwood (1924 demolished 1970s)
- Grantchester 6 residential flats, 420 Edgecliff Road, Edgecliff (1926)
- Pennant Hills Golf Club Clubhouse, Beecroft, New South Wales (1925/1929/1939)
- Mendoet 18 Wallis Avenue, Strathfield (1929 derelict for many years before being auctioned in 2025 with no heritage overlay)
- Western Suburbs Builders' Exchange 353–355 Liverpool Road Ashfield (1929)
- House 66 Wallaroy Road, Woollahra (1933)
- Orwell 3 Turuga Street, Turramurra (1933)
- Wallis Hall Meriden School, Strathfield (1936)
- Insurance House 263 George Street, Sydney (1939, sandstone fenestration only remains)

== Gallery ==
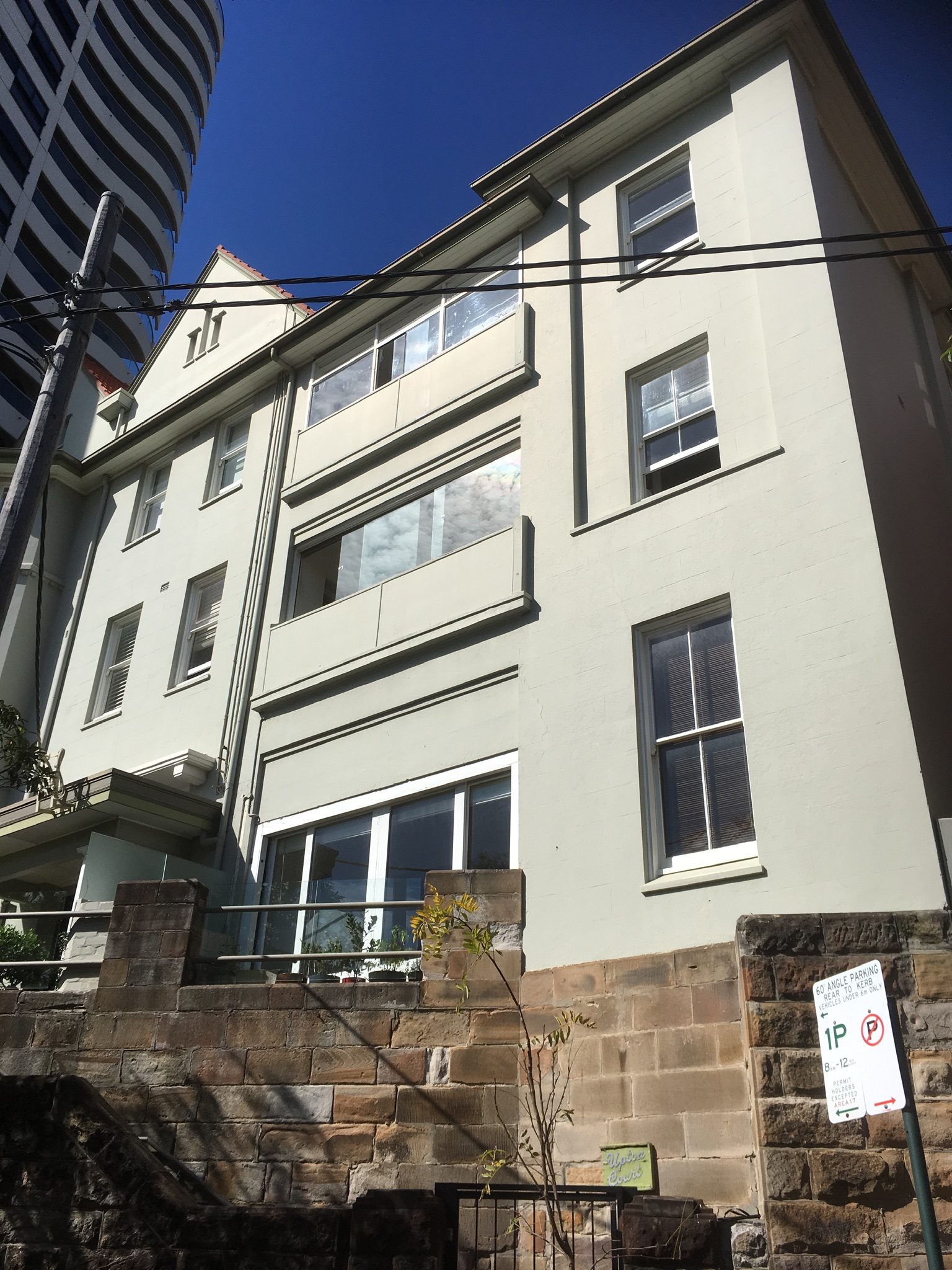
Upton Court, Forbes Street, Darlinghurst

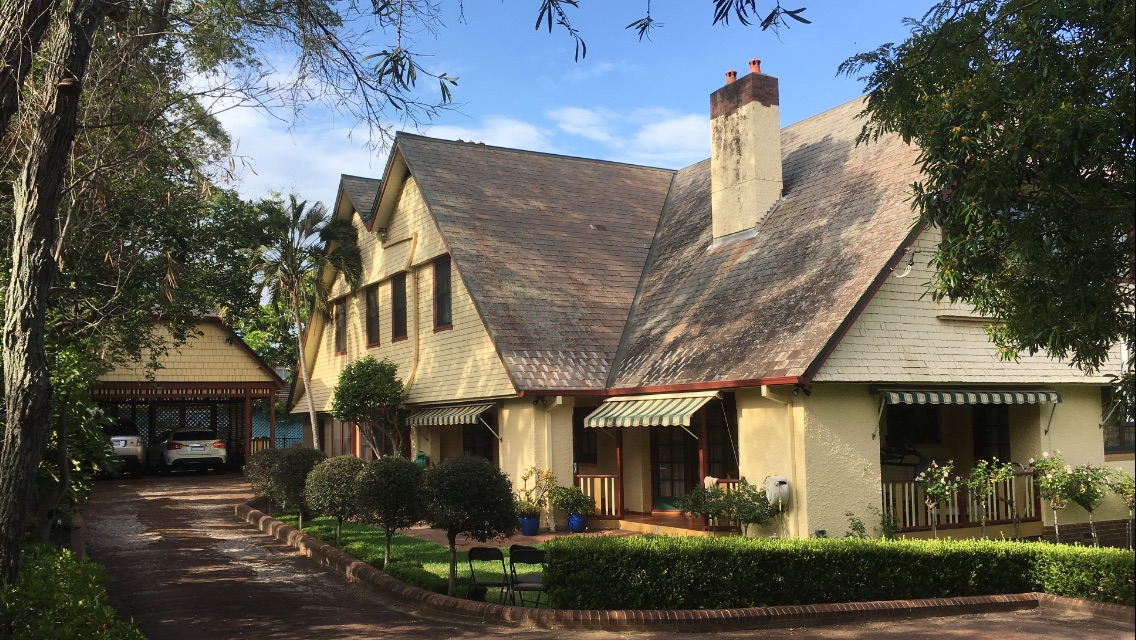
Kama, Llandilo Avenue, Strathfield

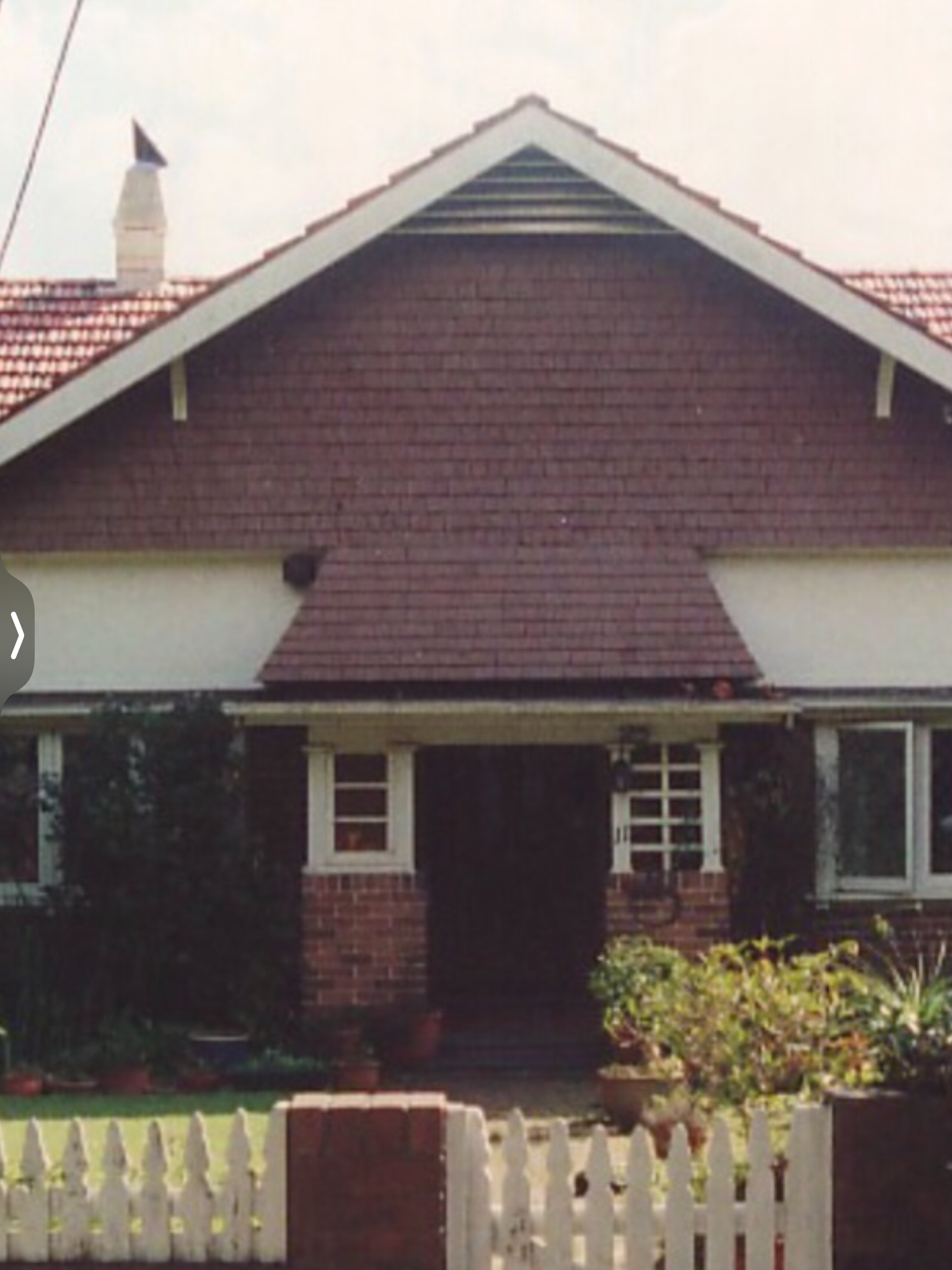
Kingsland Road, Strathfield

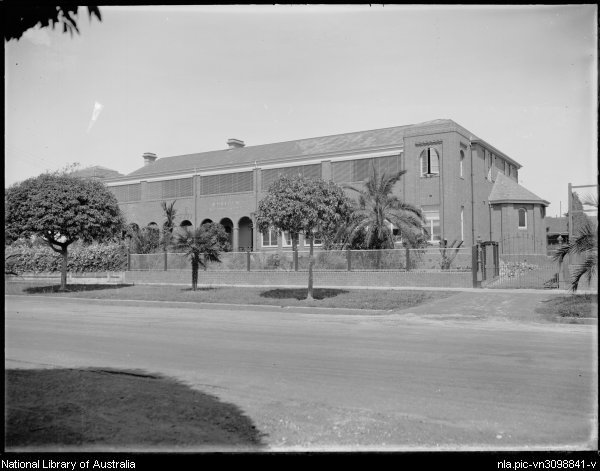
Wallis Hall, Meriden, Strathfield

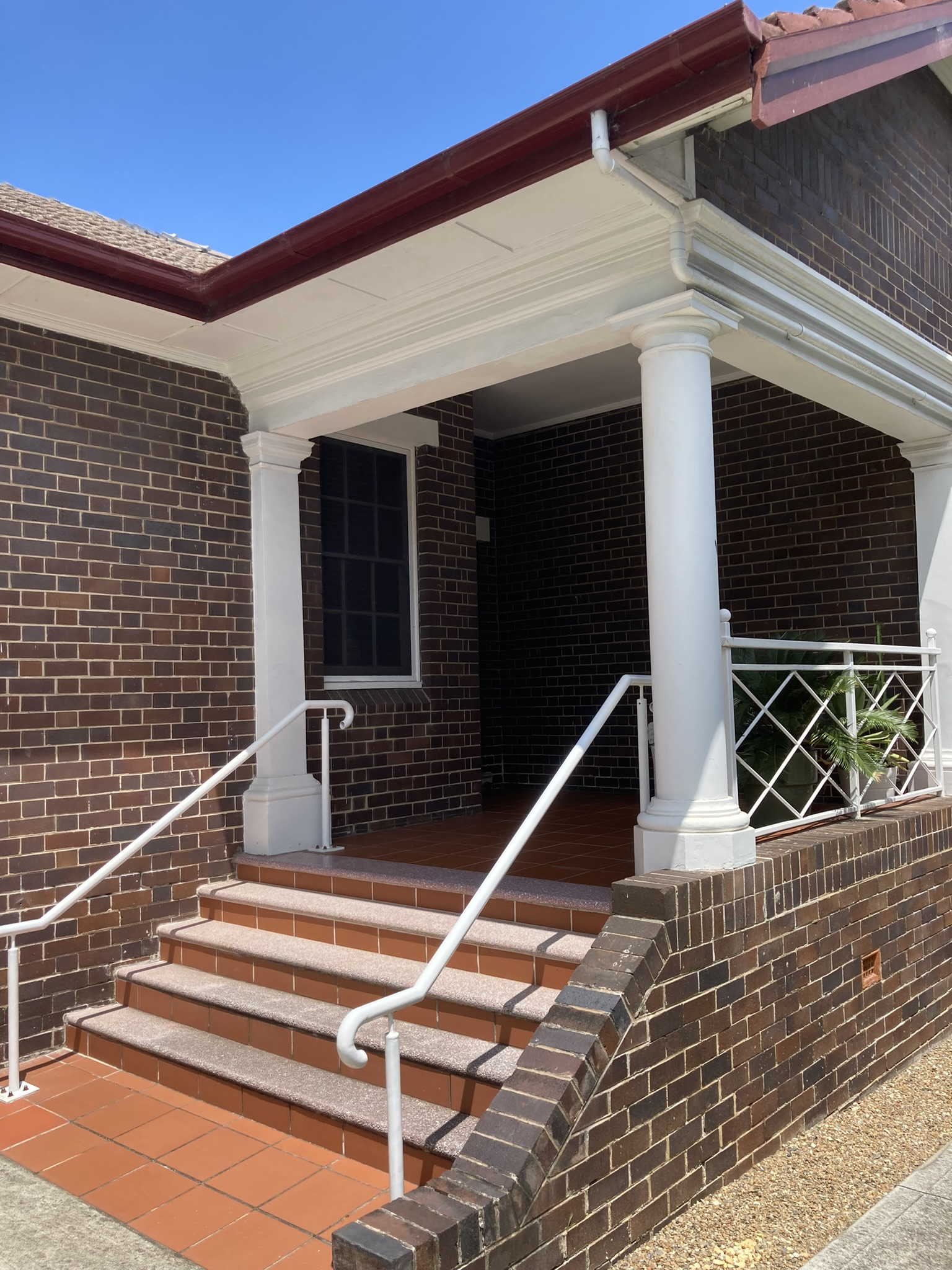
Derwent, Homebush Road, Strathfield

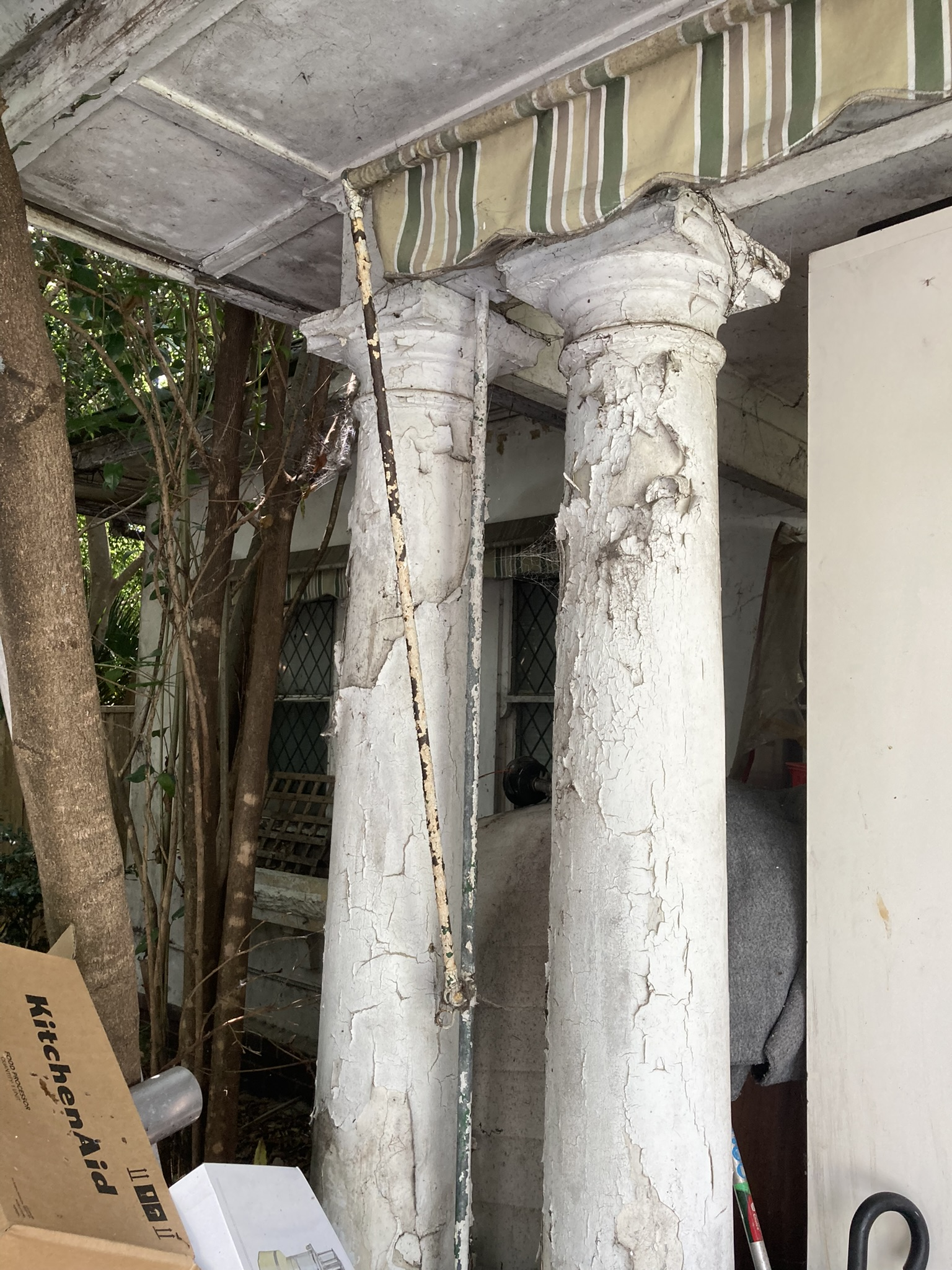
Wallis Avenue, Strathfield

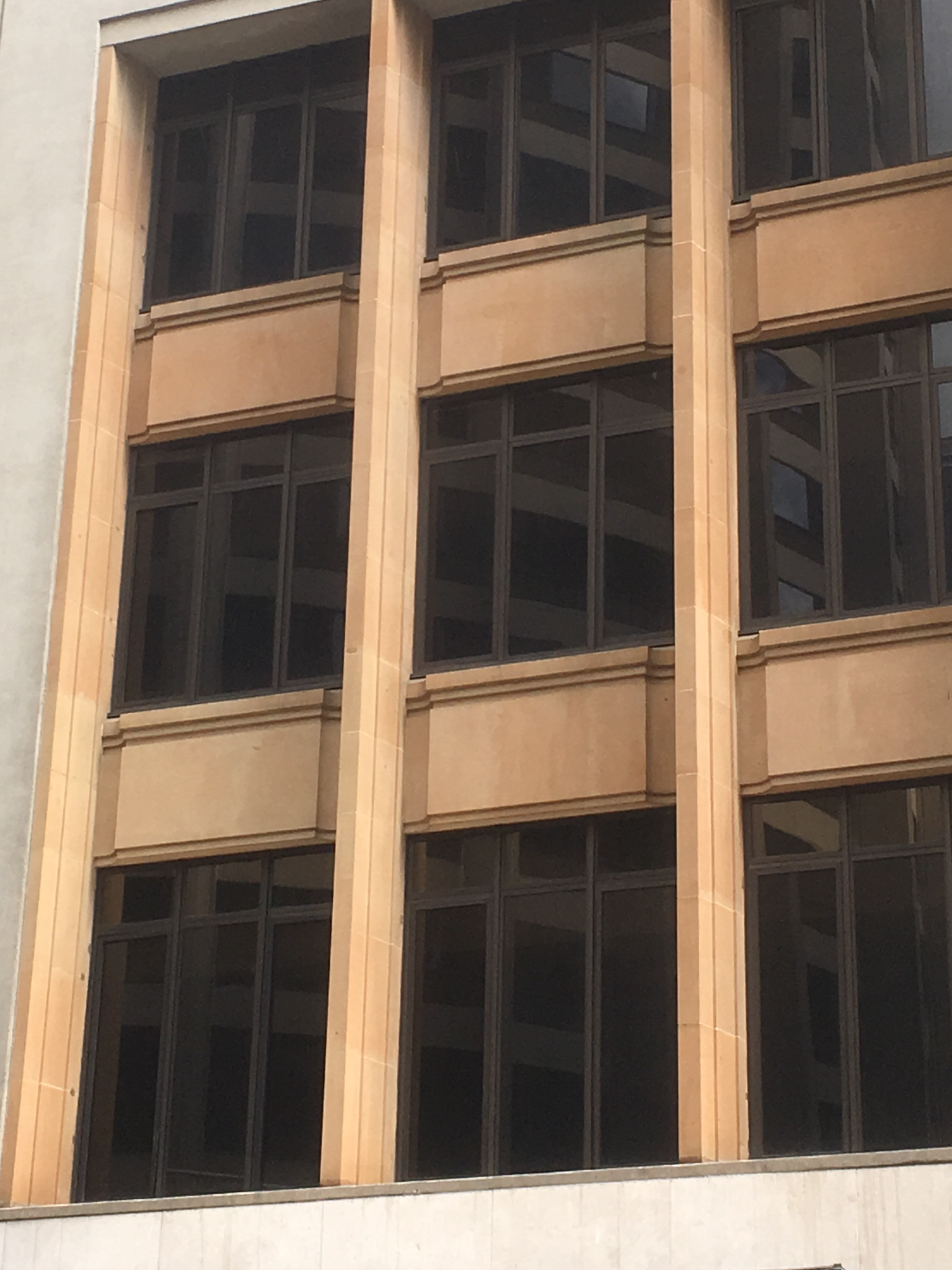
Insurance House, 263 George Street, Sydney

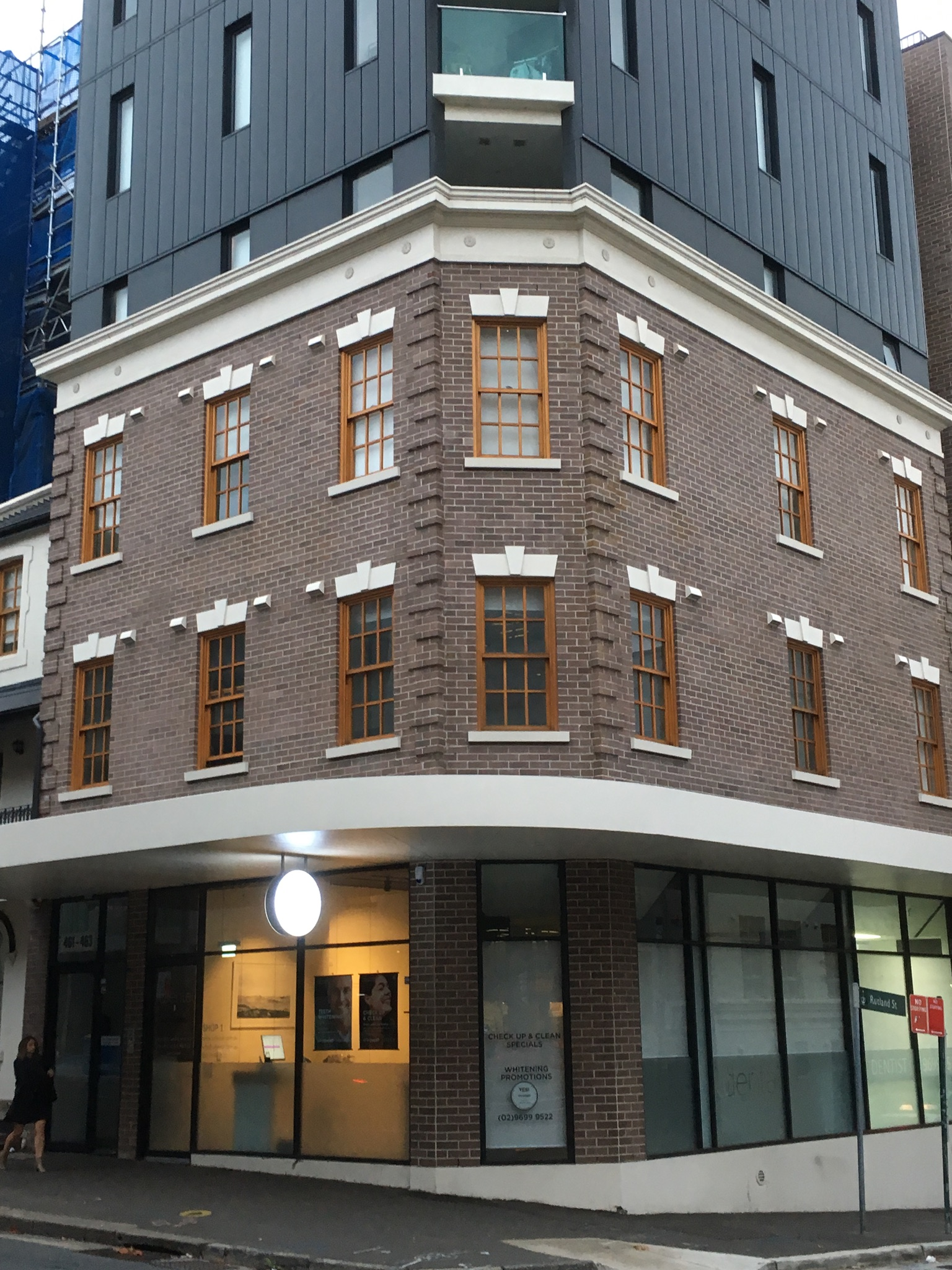
Commonwealth Hotel, 461 Elizabeth Street, Surry Hills
