= Herbert Dennis =

Victorian-born Australian architect

Herbert Osborn Dennis ARIBA
- Born: 14 November 1879; Elsternwick, Victoria
- Died: 8 September 1939 (aged 59); Drummoyne, New South Wales
- Education: Queen’s College; Wesley College; Melbourne Working Men's College
- Occupation: Architect
- Parent(s): Anne (née Osborne 1852–1933) and John Hamilton Dennis (1855–1941)

Herbert Osborn Dennis (14 November 1879 – 8 September 1939) was a Victorian-born Australian architect who largely practiced in Sydney and is known for his early domestic designs and for his later substantial inner city industrial buildings showcasing early modernism.

== Early life ==
Dennis was born in Elsternwick, Victoria, the son of English–born parents Anne (née Osborne 1852–1933) and John Hamilton Dennis (1855–1941). As a child his extended family lived in Lake Boga in Victoria and his early education was at Queen’s College in Barton Terrace, North Adelaide. In 1893 he commenced as a high school student at Wesley College in Melbourne, where his father and uncle had been amongst the first 1000 boys to be educated at that Wesleyan school. At Wesley he was involved in football, tennis, diving and athletics. He gained his Australian rules football colours in 1896. In May of the same year he matriculated to the University of Melbourne but stayed at Wesley until the end of 1897. From 1898 he studied architecture at the Working Men's College of Melbourne graduating in 1902. He then worked in London and travelled widely on the continent until returning to Australia and setting up in practice on Collins Street, Melbourne.

== Sydney architect ==
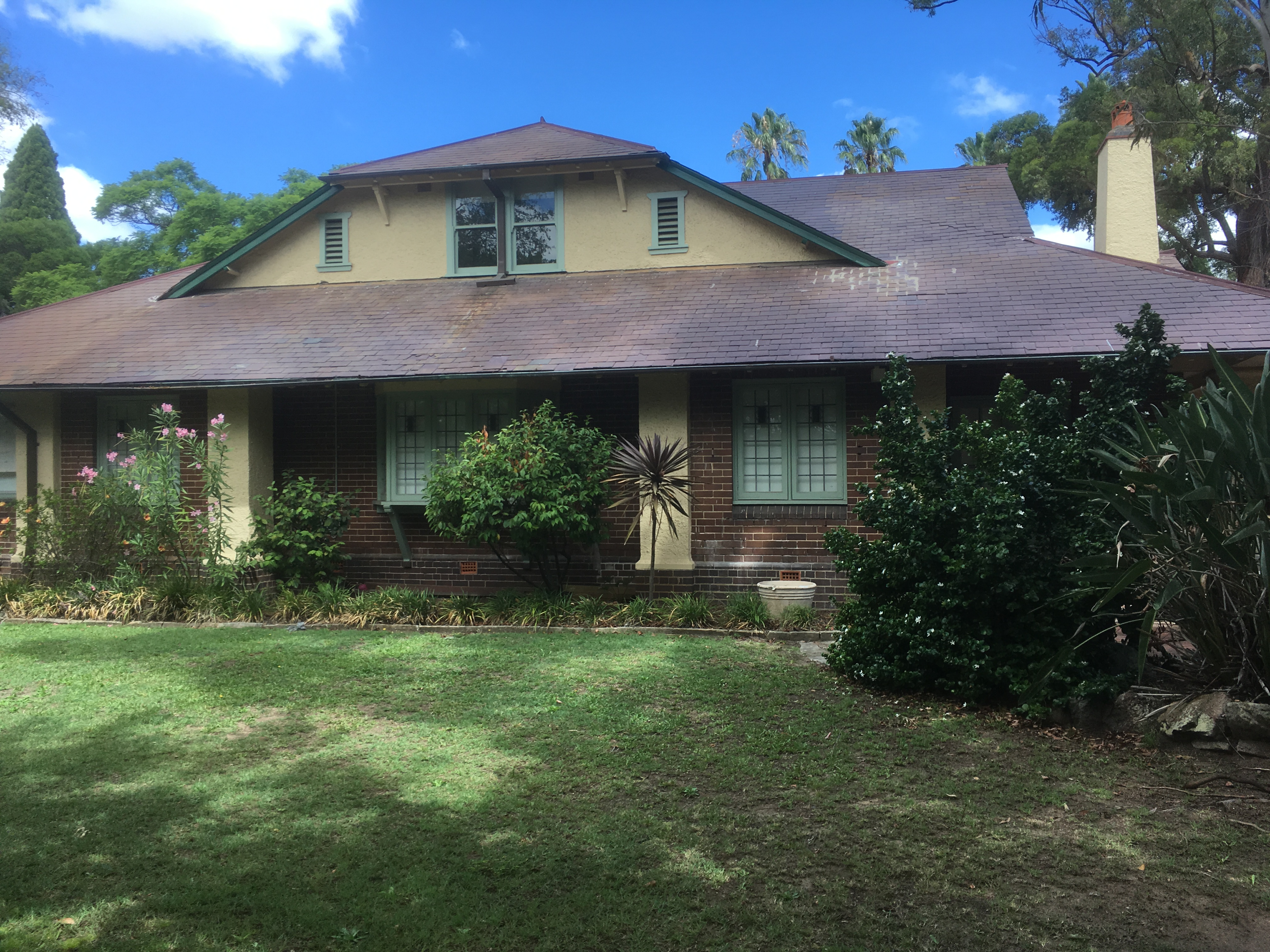
Halcyon, Homebush Road, Strathfield.designed by Dennis in 1916.

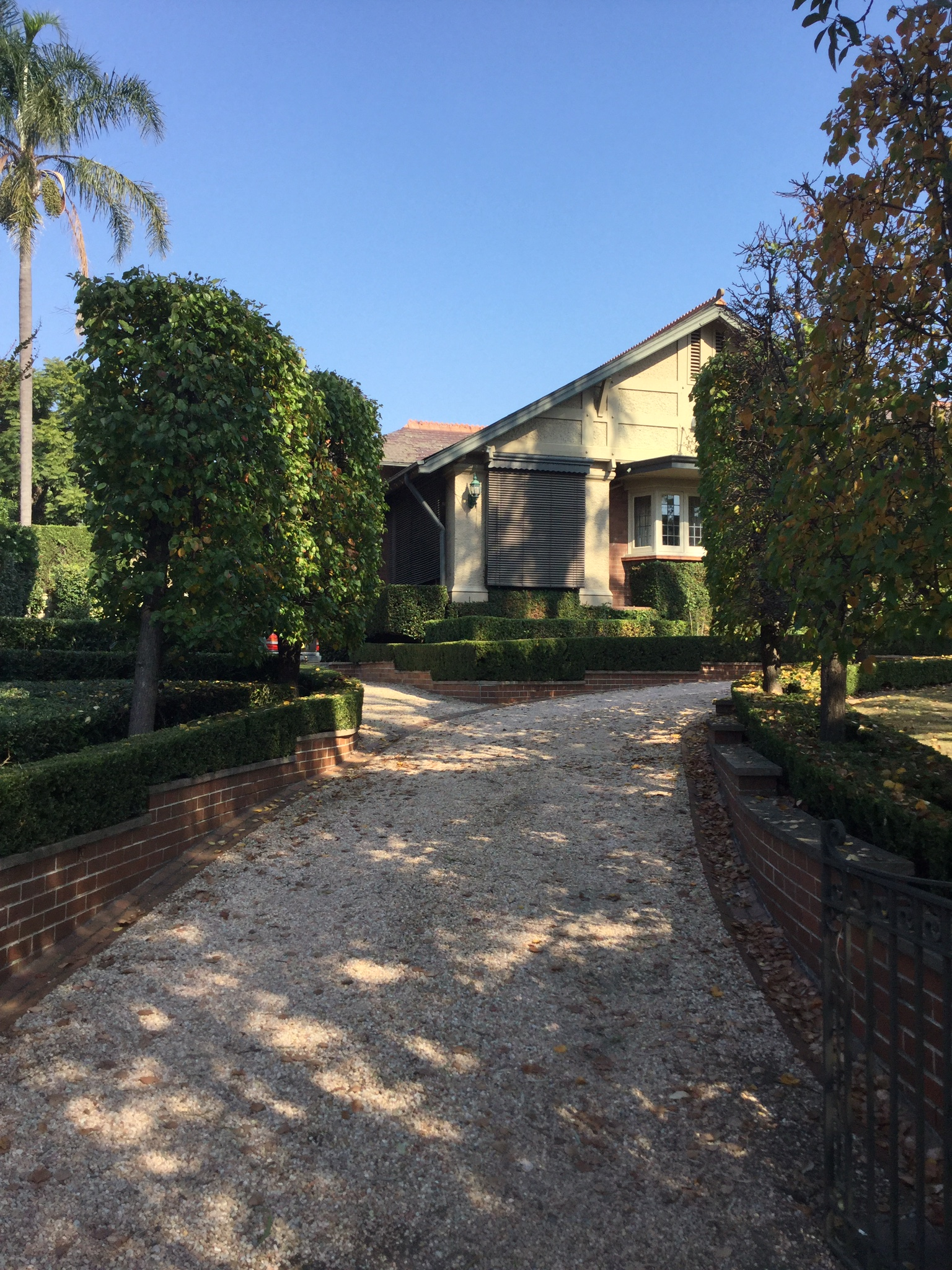
Wawona, Albyn Road, Strathfield, designed by Dennis in 1916.

Moving to Sydney Dennis worked on projects with numerous architects including B.J. Waterhouse & J.H.W. Lake, T.P. Sampson, H.E. Wardell and K.A. Odling. In 1910 Dennis designed the Methodist Church in Drummoyne. The two foundation stones were laid on 19 March 1910 by Joseph Vickery, the son of Ebenezer Vickery a benefactor of the Methodist Church, and Charles John Prescott, who at the time was President of the New South Wales Methodist Conference. Two years later he was the architect of four shops at 219-223 Victoria Road Drummoyne that are now part of the Sutton Place Shopping Centre on the corner of Lyons and Victoria Road. Having moved to Lyons Road himself he started to design houses in the suburb including substantial homes on St. George’s Crescent. In 1915 Dennis designed a Literary Institute at Wentworth Falls that is now known as the School of Arts. The following year he designed two substantial private residences in Strathfield. Halcyon at 110 Homebush Road, Strathfield, and Wawona at 96 Albyn Road, Strathfield, are stylistically very similar to his design from the year before of the cultural facility in the Blue Mountains. In 1916 The Salon (a publication of the Australian Institute of Architects) featured a house designed by Dennis at 4 Fern Street Pymble for himself and his new wife.

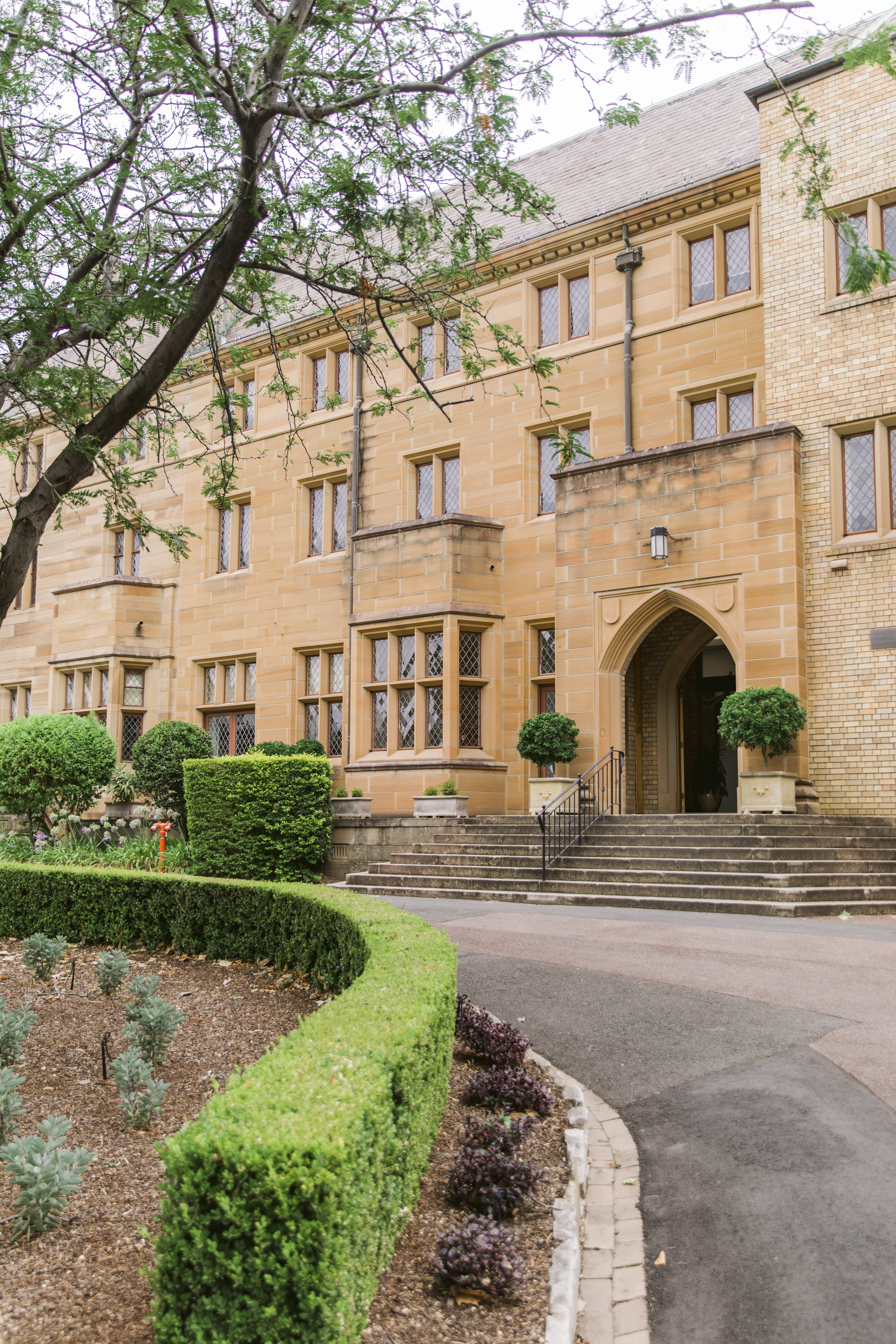
The main entrance to the 1926 Wardell and Dennis designed Sancta Sophia College at the University of Sydney.

During the 1920s Dennis worked with Herbert Edmund Wardell in a partnership trading as Wardell and Dennis. Wardell was the son of renowned architect William Wardell. The Wardell family had excellent connections within the Roman Catholic Archdiocese of Sydney and this led to the firm designing the 1926 wing of Sancta Sophia College at the University of Sydney. The firm also designed many substantial banking chambers and managers residences for the Bank of Australasia in towns around New South Wales including Newcastle, Orange, Moree and Narromine. The Narromine building is now a branch of the National Australia Bank and is a well preserved feature of the towns main street. In 1931 Dennis designed a four-story factory building in Cressy Street, Rosebery, for Burroughs Wellcome & Co. In 1933 he designed seven shops in Liverpool Street in the City of Sydney known as Leuralla Shopping Block. He built them for Harry Andreas the wealthy yachtsman and big-game fisherman whose home in Leura was also named Leuralla. Next door to the Leuralla shops at 99-101 Liverpool Street Dennis designed a three-story building for the Sam Lands retail jewellery store. His Liverpool Street facades where face brick and in an Art Deco style. The site backed on to the massive Anthony Hordern & Sons block and the buildings were demolished in the 1990s and replaced by the Rydges World Square Hotel as part of the World Square development.

Working with Kenneth Ansolm Ooldling in 1938, Dennis designed the Cane-ite building for CSR on the foreshore at Pyrmont. It has since been demolished as part of the redevelopment of Jacksons Landing.

== Private life ==
Dennis married Emma Josephine Bull (1883-1957) on 11 September 1912 in the Presbyterian Church, Drummoyne. In March 1913 Emma Dennis purchased the land at 4 Fern Street Pymble where Dennis designed a home for the newly married couple and their young daughter. Emma sold the house in January 1919 and the Dennis family moved to the Inner Western suburb of Drummoyne overlooking the Parramatta River. Dennis designed a new house at 1 Napier Street, Drummoyne, at that time. The house was on a subdivision of 5 Napier Street that was owned by his father-in-law Sidney John Bull a former Mayor of Drummoyne. Their daughter Elinor Josephine Dennis was born in 1913 and she married Lieutenant Commander Philipp Oliver Laelius Owen RAN in 1939. Dennis died in a private hospital in Sydney in his 59th year and was privately cremated.
