= M2 (Sydney) =

Road route in Sydney

M2 New South Wales

General information
- Type: Motorway
- Length: 25 km (16 mi)
- Opened: November 1993
- Route number(s): M2 (2013–present)
- Former route number: Metroad 2 (1997–2013)

Major junctions
- East end: Gore Hill Freeway; Artarmon, Sydney
- Pacific Highway; Epping Road; Delhi Road; Lane Cove Road; Cumberland Highway; Westlink M7
- West end: Old Windsor Road; Seven Hills, Sydney / Baulkham Hills, Sydney

Location(s)
- Major suburbs / towns: Lane Cove, North Ryde, Epping, Beecroft, Carlingford, Baulkham Hills

Highway system
- Highways in Australia; National Highway • Freeways in Australia; Highways in New South Wales

The M2 is a route in Sydney, New South Wales, Australia, that links Sydney suburbs from Artarmon in the south-east to Bella Vista in the north-west. The route consists of two separately named motorways, the M2 Hills Motorway and the Lane Cove Tunnel.

The M2 route replaces the motorway sections of what was known as Metroad 2 from 1993 to 2013, with the non-motorway sections replaced by the A2 route (made up of Windsor Road and Old Windsor Road).

== Lane Cove Tunnel and M2 Hills Motorway ==
The Lane Cove Tunnel was open to traffic in March 2007. Prior to the opening of the Lane Cove Tunnel, the Metroad 2 followed Epping Road, between the Pacific Highway and Mowbray Road west. The M2 Hills Motorway was opened nearly 10 years prior to the Lane Cove Tunnel in May 1997, replacing sections of Metroad 2 between North Ryde and Baulkham Hills, between Old Windsor road and Carlingford Road, along Epping Road to Delhi Road, Beecroft Road, Pennant Hills Road (part of the Cumberland Highway), Castle Hill Road and Showground Road, Old Windsor Road and Windsor Road.

== History of the Metroad 2 route ==
Prior to the opening of the M2 Hills Motorway in 1997, the Metroad 2 route ran along Epping Road, Beecroft Road, Pennant Hills Road (Part of the Cumberland Highway), Castle Hill Road and Showground Road, Old Windsor Road and Windsor Road. These former stretches were parts of State Routes 28 and 30 until Metroad 2 replaced them in November 1993.

The southern/eastern extremity of Metroad 2 was originally at the city end of the Sydney Harbour Bridge, with the Warringah Freeway and Gore Hill Freeway duplexed as both Metroad 1 and Metroad 2. However the route was later truncated with Metroad 2 ending at the east end of the Lane Cove Tunnel.

In 2013 with the introduction of alphanumeric route numbers in New South Wales, Metroad 2 was decommissioned, with the motorway sections replaced by route M2, and the non-motorway sections (Old Windsor Road and Windsor Road) receiving the A2 marker.

== See also ==
- Highways in New South Wales
