= Pennant Hills Golf Club =

Golf club in Beecroft, New South Wales, Australia

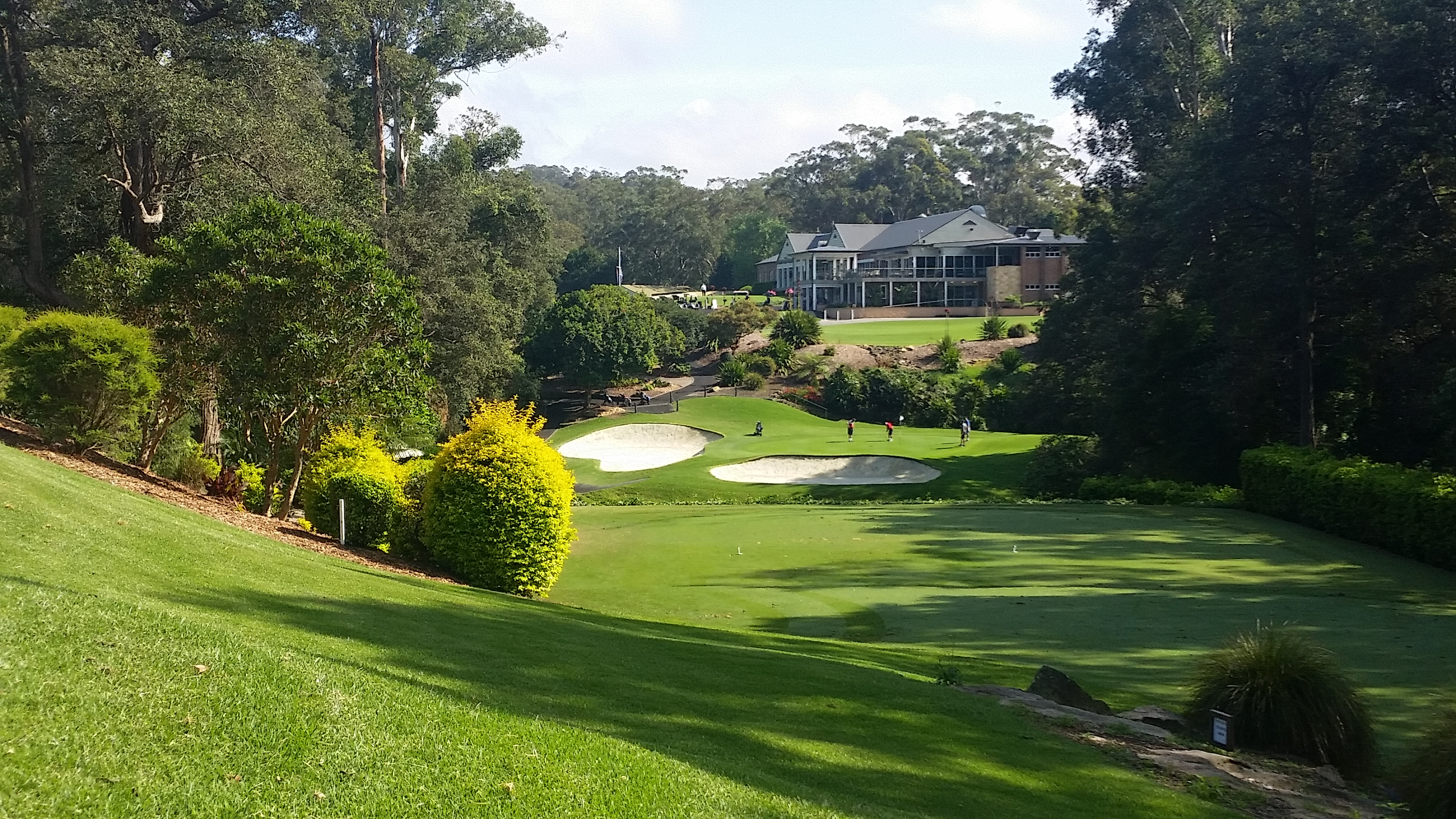
- Pennant Hills Golf Clubhouse and 9th hole
- Interactive map of Pennant Hills Golf Club
- 33.753537°S 151.056394°E

Club information
- Location: Cnr Copeland Road and Burns Road Beecroft, New South Wales
- Established: 1923
- Type: Private
- Owner: Pennant Hills Golf Club Limited
- Total holes: 18
- Website: www.pennanthillsgolfclub.com.au
- Designed by: Tom Howard (initial)
- Par: 71
- Length: 5,925 metres (6,480 yd)

The Pennant Hills Golf Club is a golf club in Beecroft, New South Wales, Australia, a suburb of Sydney. Founded in 1923, it is a 5,925 metres (6,480 yd) par 71 eighteen-hole championship course. It has hosted many amateur events including the NSW Men's and NSW Ladies Amateur Championships. In 1925, the original clubhouse was designed by Thomas Pollard Sampson, a playing member of the club, and he extended the building in 1929 and again in 1939.

Membership. From a membership of 100 in February 1924 ( Golf in Australia Feb 7, 1924) the membership in June 2024 was 1352 ranging from Under 21 to Over 80.

Junior Golf. In 1996 the club introduced a formal Cadet development program for children 13 years and over. This proved a highly successful program with many young golfers developing skills and progressing into full membership. In mid-2014, the club established the Kendal Binns Junior Foundation with the charter to promote, support and develop Junior Members to become better golfers and long-term contributing Members of the Club. The Foundation grants scholarships to assist young golfers who meet a pre-set level of golfing ability. (2025-2026 Kendal Binns Junior Fund Scholarships Application January 2025)

Male Pennants and Female Grade teams. PHGC fielded its first interclub Men’s Grade team in March 1926 in C Grade. In 1936, the Men’s Grade team won the B Grade Flag. Over the ensuing years the club entered teams in many interclub competitions and currently has teams in Men’s Pennants, Ladies Interclub Grade, Mixed, Masters, Eric Apperly, Junior Pennants and Encourage Shield competitions.

== History ==
The club was incorporated on 26 February 1923 when it completed the purchase of an area of land of 97 acres, 1 rood and 24 ½ perches, paying £4750 to Mr J.W Meader for the land previously secured by Robert Vicars.

An initial course layout in 1923 included 9 holes on the western end which had previously been cleared for farming and cultivation. The remainder of the course was covered with hundreds of trees and stumps, water holes, and rock shelves which required removal before an 18-hole course could be completed.

The course was extended to an 18-hole course over the next year following advice provided by Professional Golfer, Tom Howard, the then holder of the Australian Open, NSW and Australian PGA Titles, He was paid a fee of £1/1-.

The first 18-hole layout was played in March 1924. Over subsequent years, the layout was changed until a final layout in 1934, which opened on 17 March 1934.

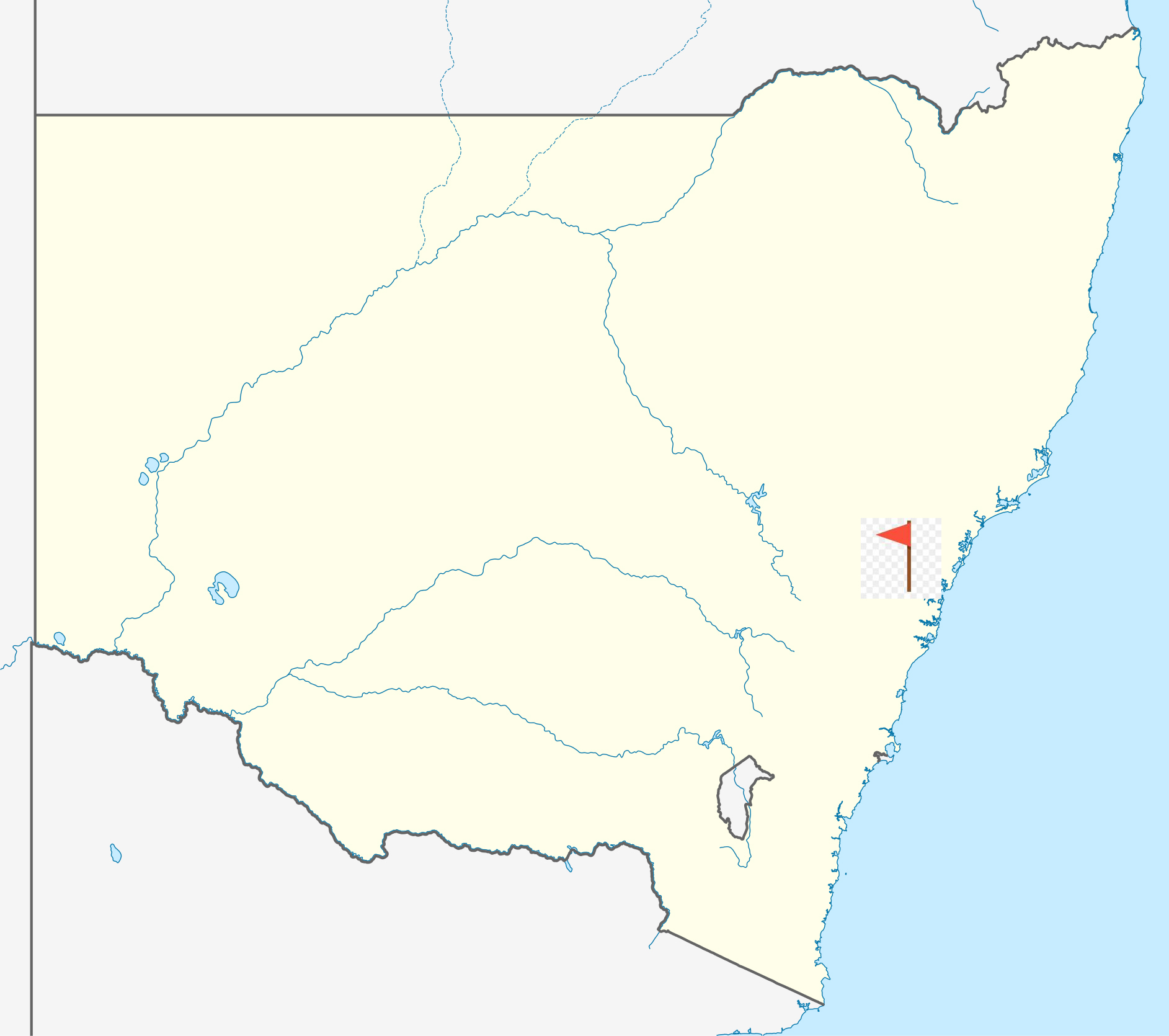

=== Layout and signature holes ===
Apart from the initial course layout in 1923/24 designed with the advice of Tom Howard, the subsequent course design was mostly done by club members. There was no master layout for the course, which evolved through five progressive layouts from 1924 to 1934. Each layout was enabled by the clearing of trees, which provided areas for new fairways and greens and lengthening of existing holes to achieve a course of championship length. When considering changes to the 16th hole in 1936 to create a dog-leg, Eric Apperly, then Australian Amateur Champion. was asked to provide a design.

Also in 1952 when the 9th green was reconstructed requiring excavation into the sandstone cliff behind, the advice of Australian Open Champion 1950/52/53, Norman Von Nida was sought.

In laying out the course, the design took advantage of the often steep hilly contours of the site, as well as the many stands of old growth trees and the deep gully carrying Devlins Creek through the eastern end of the course, ensuring there are few even lies. There are favourable comparisons with Augusta National with respect to the steepness of some holes.

The deep gully, only 50 metres (55 yd) in front of the clubhouse, allowed the starting and finishing holes for each nine, to require a carry across the deep gully between trees to either a rising fairway for 1 and 10, or to greens close to the clubhouse for 9 and 18.

The first hole is a 456 metres (499 yd) par four, across the gully to an elevated tree-lined fairway with a slight dog-leg before undulations to an elevated green. The remaining front nine holes follow a sequence around the perimeter, making features of the trees and undulations, before the par three 134 metres (147 yd) 9th hole crosses the deep gully from an elevated tee to a green cut from the rocky cliff on the other side. In 1927, the hole (then the 11th) was described as "hole is of the Spion Kop type, requiring a mashie shot over a creek, where again accuracy and distance must be attained to avoid severe penalties."

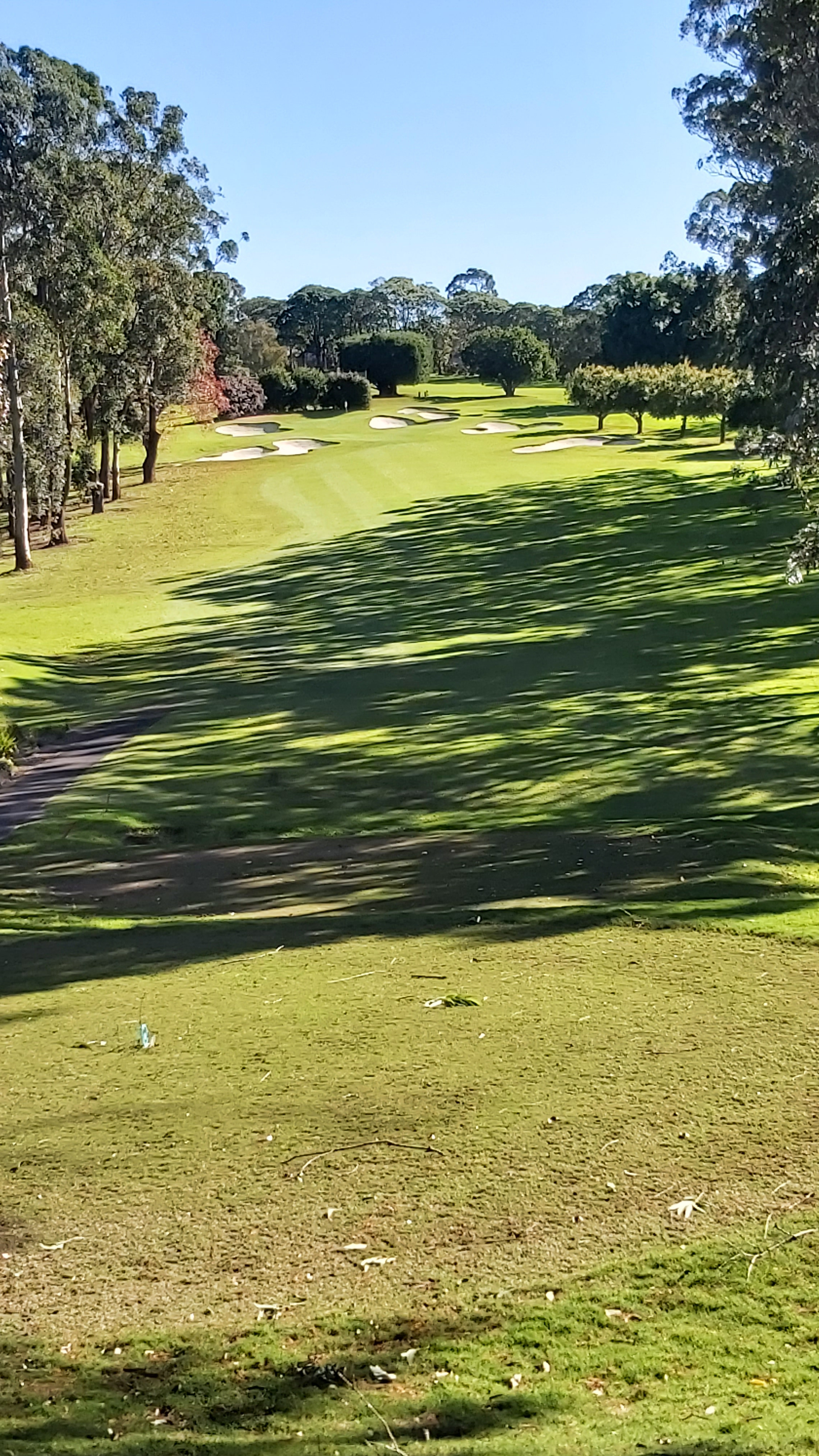
15th Hole at Pennant Hills Golf Club

The 10th 380 metres (420 yd) par four again provides a carry across the deep gully from an elevated tee, between tall trees to a steadily rising fairway and an elevated green. The remaining back nine are tree lined, with four dog-leg holes either downhill or uphill, to mainly small greens protected by bunkers. The 15th is a feature hole of only 285 metres (312 yd) par four, but from a very elevated tee, to a steep uphill tree lined fairway and small green, with heavy fairway and greenside bunkers. The hole was twice driven during the 1982 club championships match-play by Greg Wicks only to lose to a chip-in eagle in the first round by his opponent, the legendary Tony Gresham and halved in birdies in the second round.

The 167 metres (183 yd) par three 18th finishing hole is a long carry across the gully, through a narrow chute between tall eucalypts, to a steep fairway immediately below an elevated green. Early reports of the hole describe the 18th "between the tee and the green is a ‘great gulf’; an easy three or a bad twenty."

Repair and Maintenance Project. In 2024, the club entered into an agreement with the Player Group, of South Africa, to redesign the greens and surrounds to USGA standards. This Repair and Maintenance Program will replace all the greens originally designed in the 1960s by Eric Apperly. The program commenced in January 2025, and will be completed in December 2027, with 3 greens being upgraded every 6 months. with well-made temporary greens used to provide a full quality 18 holes during the reconstruction.

=== Heritage listing ===
In July 1994, the course was given heritage listing stating, "Golf course sited on undulating topography above Devlins Creek which runs through site. Conserving large stands of mature indigenous Eucalypts particularly blackbutts, blue gums and stringybarks to 30 metres (33 yd) between fairways. There are also indigenous trees around boundary and on nature strips including blackbutt, smoothbark, Angophora, stringybarks, and turpentines to 25 metres (27 yd) high."

=== Water Recycling treatment plant ===
In the early 2000s NSW experienced an extended drought which resulted in rapid lowering of the levels of water storage within the dams in the Sydney region. In November 2002, storage was at 65% and by April 2003, the storage level had dropped to 59%. The NSW State Government mandated that when levels were at 55%, restrictions on water usage would be introduced, initially targeting house hold use, but progressing to business, and Local Government Councils.

Foreshadowing the likely impact of the use of Water for Tees, Greens and Fairways on the golf course, the Pennant Hills Golf Club initiated a program to improve water security through the use of recycled sewerage effluent which could be extracted from a Sewer main running underneath part of the course.

Commencing in June 2003, initial meetings were held with Sydney Water and Hornsby Shire Council involving agreement by Sydney Water for long term exclusive extraction rights of effluent carried by the Sewer main, and agreement from the NSW Environmental Protection Agency, to protect the local environment, population and waterways. The project was a ‘first’ for these agencies, which resulted in an extended approval process. The project was completed and officially opened in May 2008.

==== Description of WRP process ====
Key elements include a sewerage off-take well in Devlin's Creek, 3 large storage tanks, and the main plant consisting of a balance tank plus 2 processing tanks (one biological and one membrane) as well as a pumping room and computerized control system within a shed. Effluent is extracted from the sewer line in Devlin's Creek, pumped to the balance tank and then put through biological processes in anoxic and aerobic conditions, before final filtering using a high tech membrane process. It then undergoes UV treatment and chlorination before going into the storage tanks. The plant provides between 500 and 650 kilolitres per day of class A water suitable for irrigation with uncontrolled public access (15 to 19 million litres per month).

The treated water contains significant levels of nitrogen and other nutrients which has reduced the requirement for use of artificial fertilisers on the course.

Northconnex

In March 2024 an agreement was signed with Northconnex for the supply of treated water from the Northconnex tunnel.

The water is supplied via a 100mm under bore from the NorthConnex treatment plant on the west side of Pennant Hills Road to a point about 125 metres north of the third green where it is brought to the surface and piped underground to the Water Reclamation Plant and blended with WRP the water making the water suitable for use anywhere on the course and making the club totally independent of mains water for irrigation.

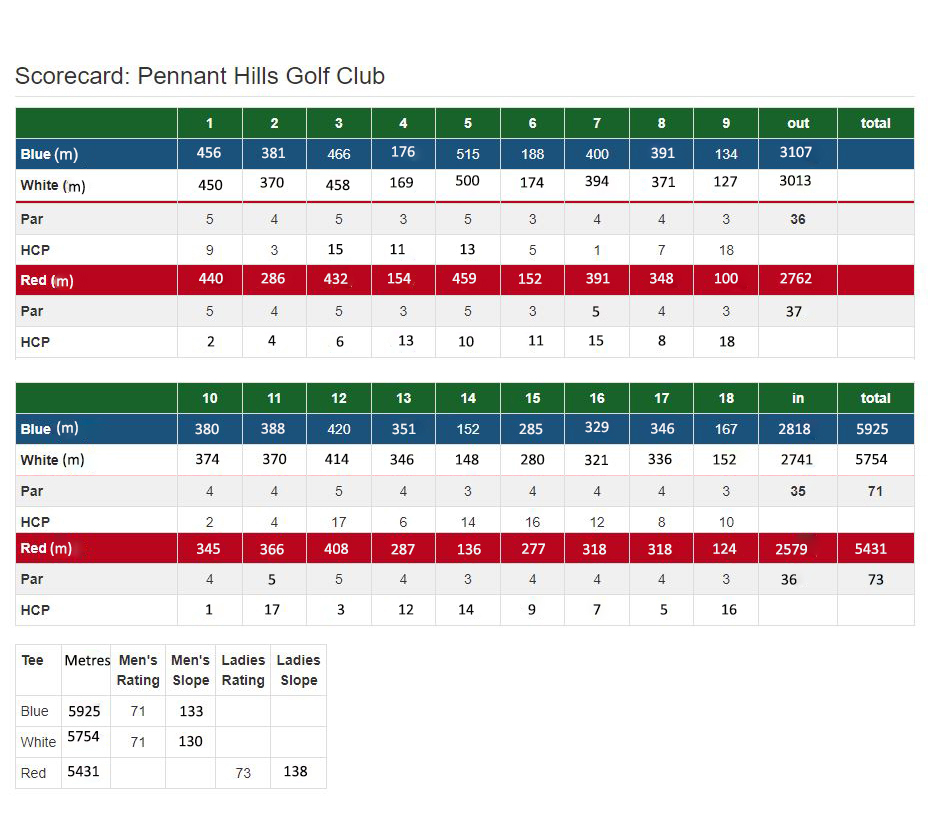
Hole rating and Slope

== State Championship events held at Pennant Hills Golf Club ==
Year	Event	Winner	Score	Runner up
1952	NSW PGA Championship	Kel Nagle	270	Sam Richardson
1954	NSW PGA Championship	Eric Cremin	290	Jim McInnes
1955	NSW PGA Championship	Kel Nagle	280	Eric Cremin
1959	NSW Mens Open	Henry Kershaw	284	Kel Nagle
1964	NSW Mens Amateur	Barrie Baker	3 & 2	Kevin Donohoe
1972	NSW Mens Amateur	Tony Gresham	5 & 4	George Bell
1998	NSW Mens Amateur	Darren Mackay	2 & 1	Nathan Green
1998	NSW Women's Amateur	Nadina Campbell	1 up	L. Fergusson
2008	NSW Mens Amateur Medal	Rohan Blizzard		
2023	NSW Mens Amateur Medal	Christopher Fan	1st Playoff	Lincoln Morgan
2023	NSW Mens Amateur	Abel Eduard	3 & 1	Harrison Crowe
2023	NSW Women's Amateur	Shyla Singh	4 & 3	Godiva Kim

== Course Records ==
=== Men ===
1952 - Set by Kel Nagle on 22 Nov 1952 in his third round of the NSW PGA Championships. His score of 63 set the course record for the course of 6,359 yards (5,815 m), par 71. 1968 - Set by Tony Gresham on 13 July 1968 in a stroke round. His score of 63 set the course record for the course of 6,376 yards (5,830 m), par 71.

2023 -Set by Christopher Fan of Avondale GC in the 1st qualifying round of the NSW Mens Amateur Championships. His score of 63 on a course of 5915m included 10 birdies with 8 birdies from 10th through to 17th.

=== Women ===
2004 - Set by Julia Boland on 23 September 2004 in a stroke round during qualification for Club Championships. Her score of 66 set the course record for the course of 5,329 metres (5,828 yd), par 73.
