= Beecroft, New South Wales =

Beecroft
- Suburb
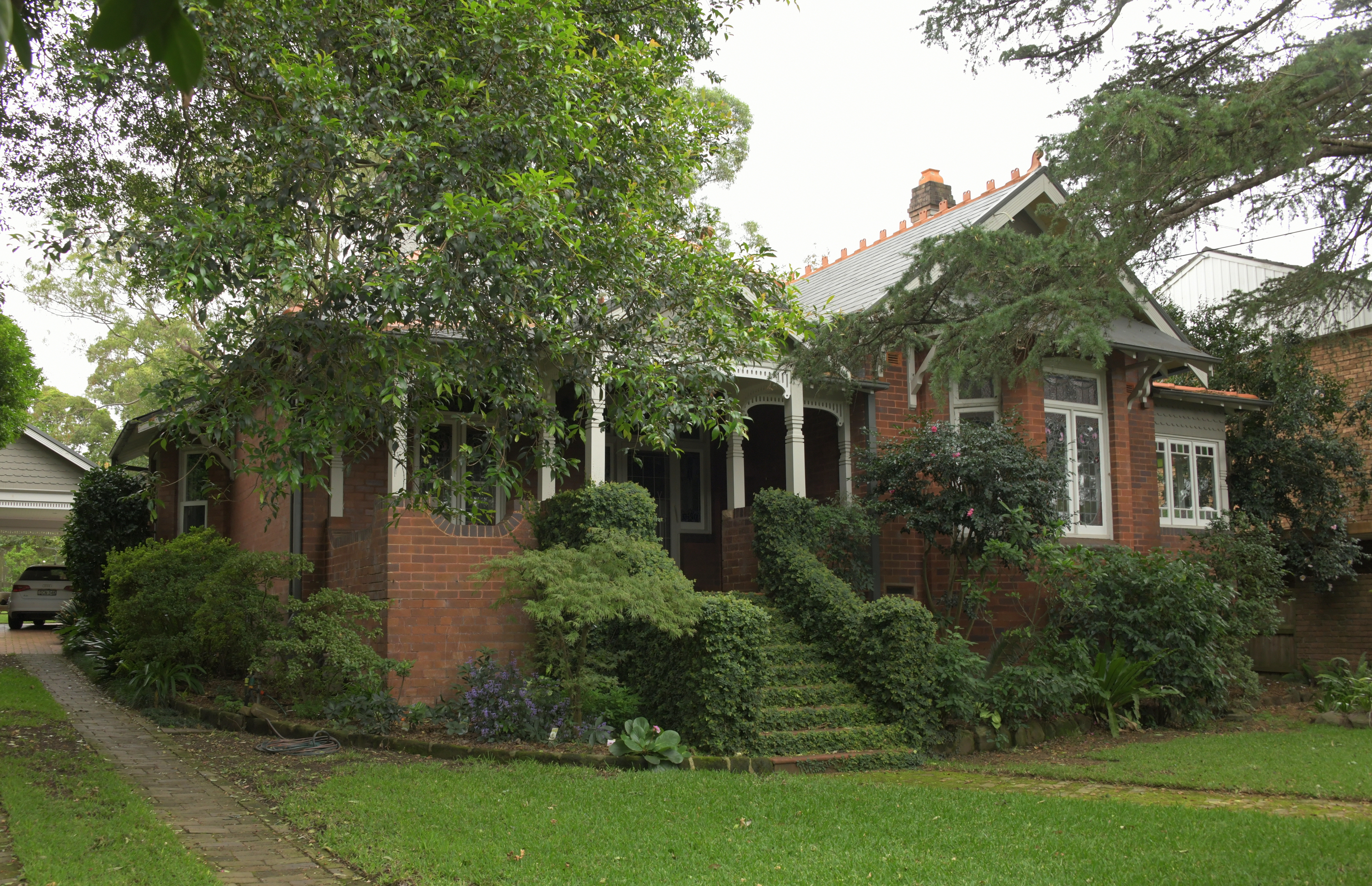
- Suburban home in Beecroft in the Federation style

- Interactive map of Beecroft
- Country: Australia
- State: New South Wales
- City: Sydney
- LGAs: Hornsby Shire; City of Parramatta
- Location: 22 km (14 mi) north-west of Sydney CBD

Government
  - State electorate: Epping
  - Federal divisions: Berowra; Parramatta

Area
  - Total: 5.1 km^{2} (2.0 sq mi)
- Elevation: 145 m (476 ft)

Population
  - Total: 10,291 (2021 census)
  - Density: 2,018/km^{2} (5,230/sq mi)
- Postcode: 2119
Suburbs around Beecroft
West Pennant Hills	Pennant Hills	Pennant Hills
West Pennant Hills	Beecroft	Cheltenham
Carlingford	Carlingford	Epping

Beecroft is a suburb in the Northern Sydney region of Sydney, in the state of New South Wales, Australia 22 kilometres north-west of the Sydney central business district in the local government areas of Hornsby Shire and City of Parramatta.

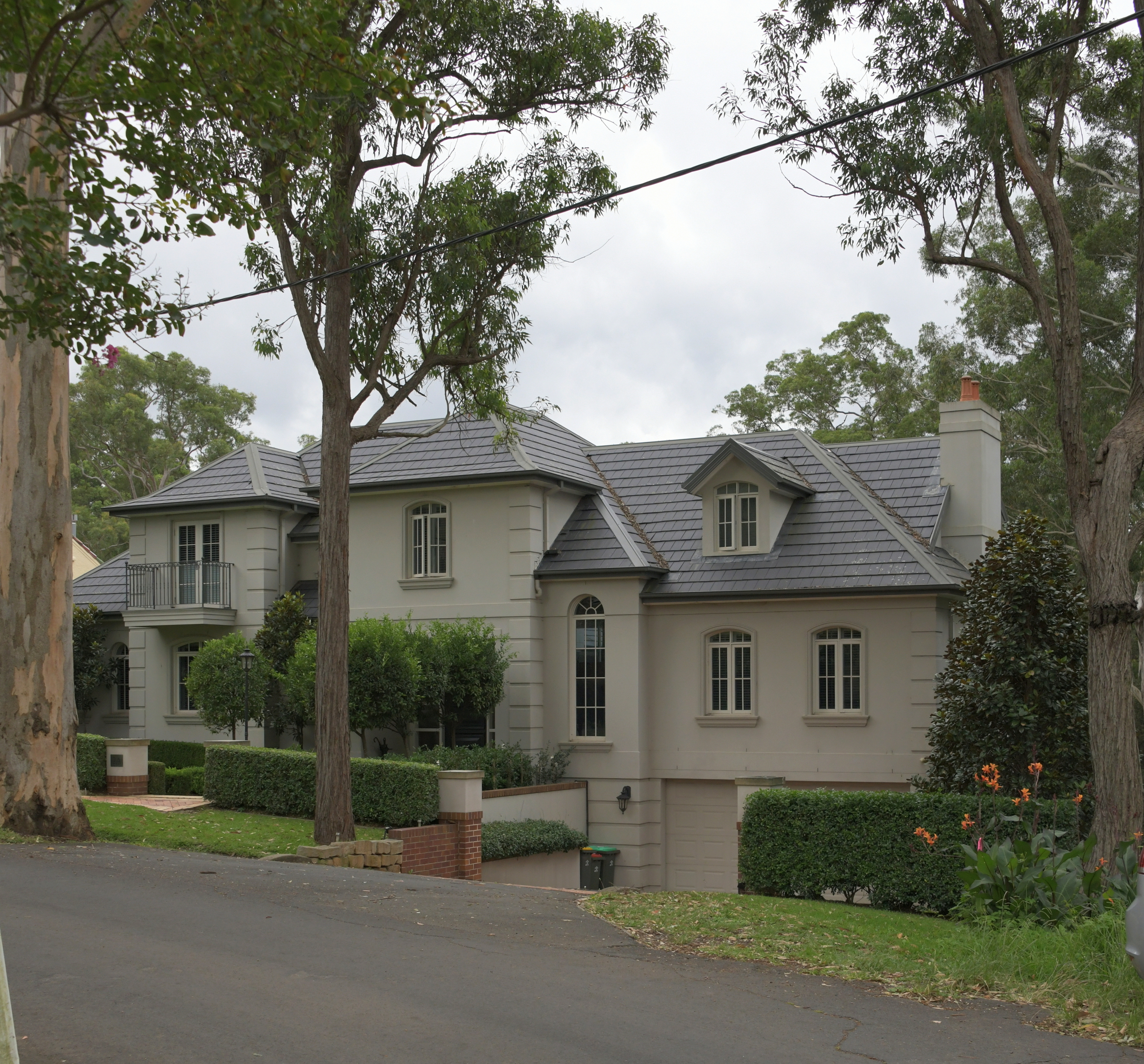
Suburban home in Beecroft

Beecroft includes the upper section of Lane Cove National Park, and is one of the oldest established suburbs in New South Wales. The suburb is notably affluent, and is characterised by leafy streets and large federation homes on large blocks of land.

== History ==
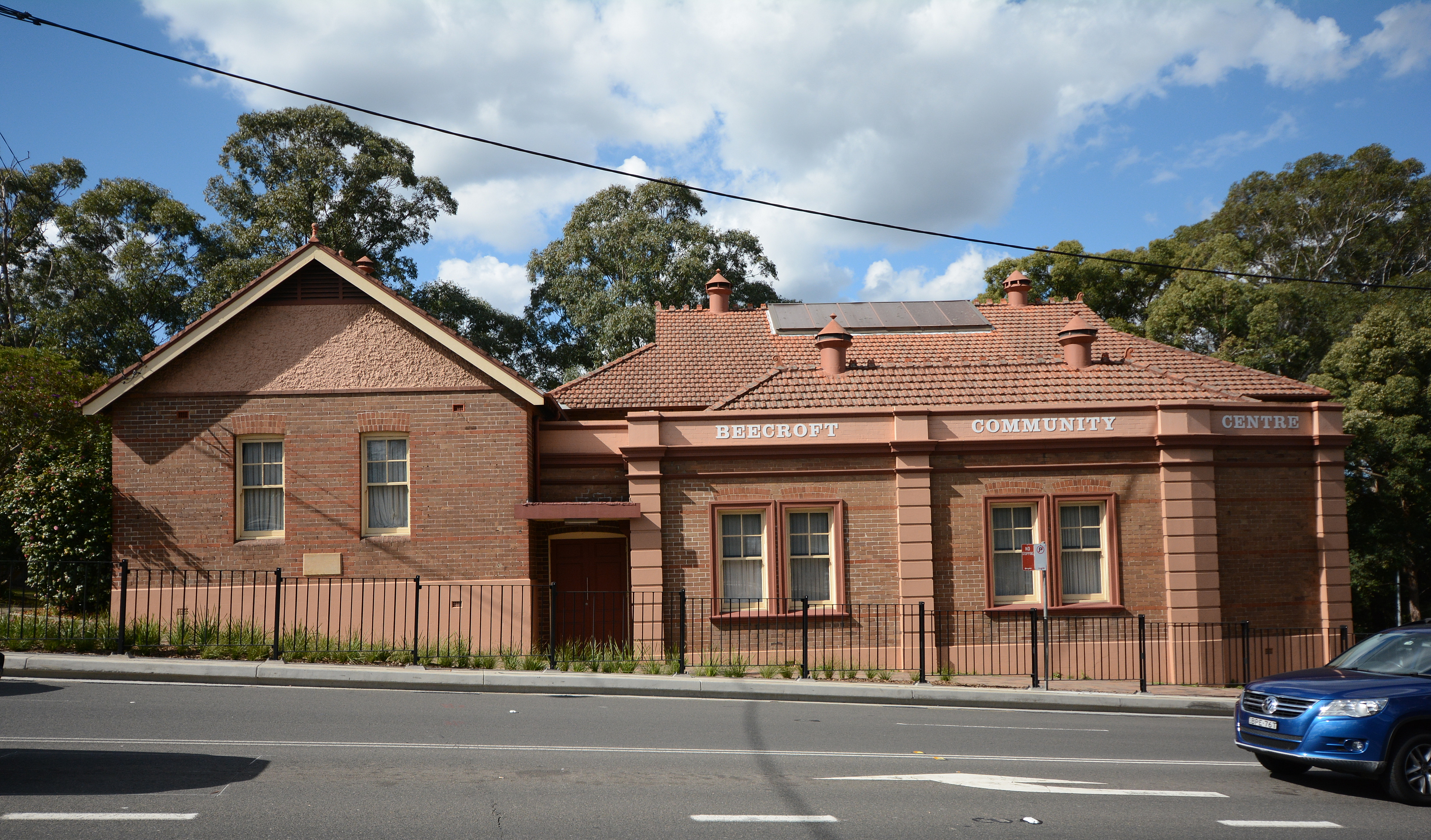
Beecroft Community Centre

Beecroft was orchard country before its suburban development. The railway arrived in 1886 and Sir Henry Copeland, Minister of Lands, conducted a survey of the area to determine its suitability as a residential area. He named the suburb after the maiden name of his two wives, Hannah and Mary Beecroft (two sisters he married in succession). Their names are also remembered through the respective naming of the suburb's east-west streets; Hannah Street, Copeland Road and Mary Street. Beecroft Post Office opened on 10 February 1890. Due to the strength of the temperance movement in Beecroft at that time there have never been any hotels in Beecroft. The bushland and amenity of Beecroft has been largely preserved due to the efforts of the Beecroft Cheltenham Civic Trust which has been very active since its inception in 1958.

=== Beecroft Cheltenham History Group ===
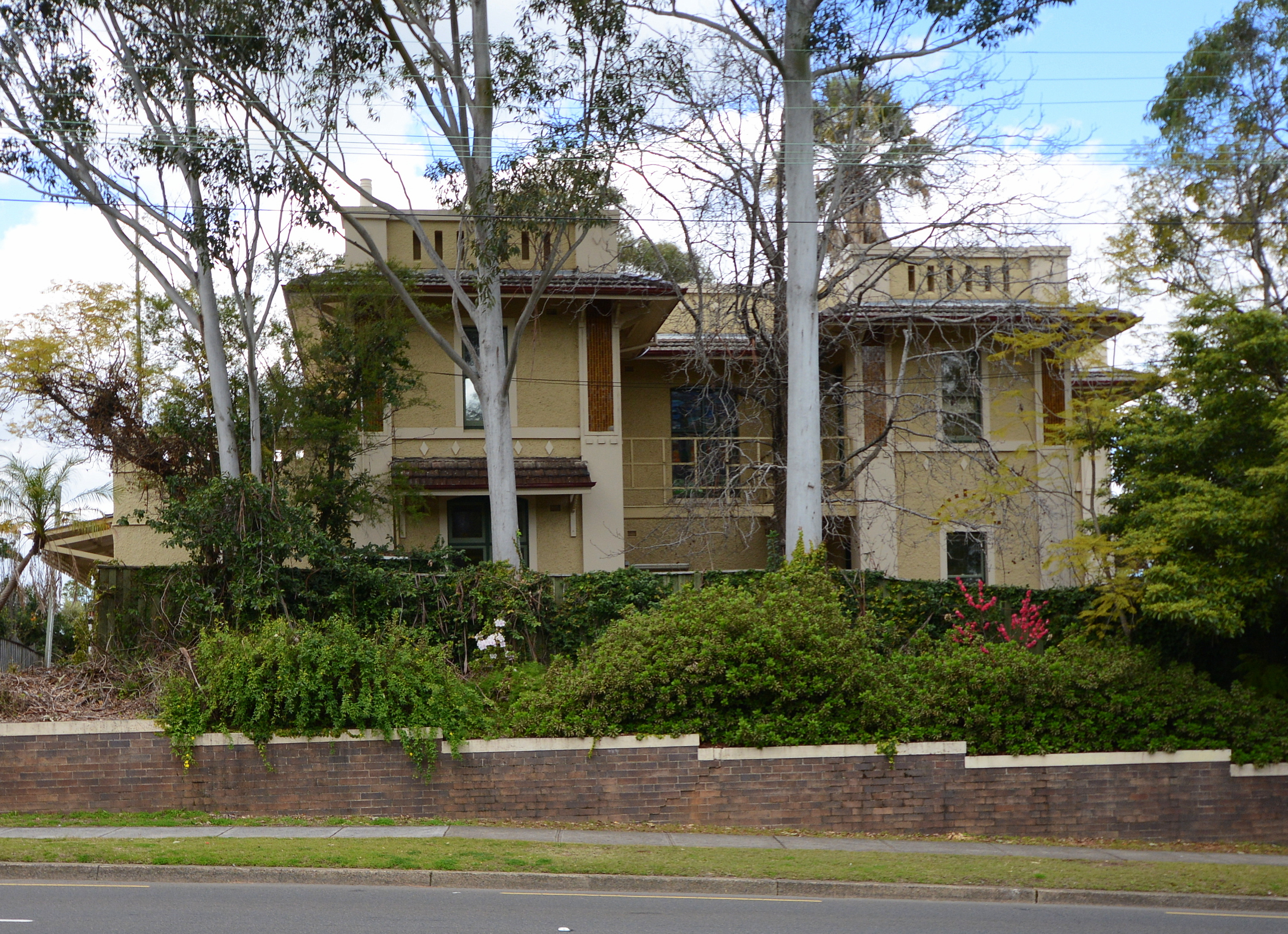
Lorne House, now part of Arden Anglican School, was designed by George Sydney Jones (1868 – 1927)

The BCHG was founded in 1987 by local history enthusiasts to record the history of Beecroft and Cheltenham and to collect and preserve photos and other historical information relative to the area. Since 2005 the BCHG has been part of the Beecroft Cheltenham Civic Trust. In 1995 a book covering the history of Beecroft and Cheltenham up to 1914 was published. In 2004 a book on walks around the district was published. In 2005 a book about the Beecroft Children’s Library was published.

== Commercial area ==
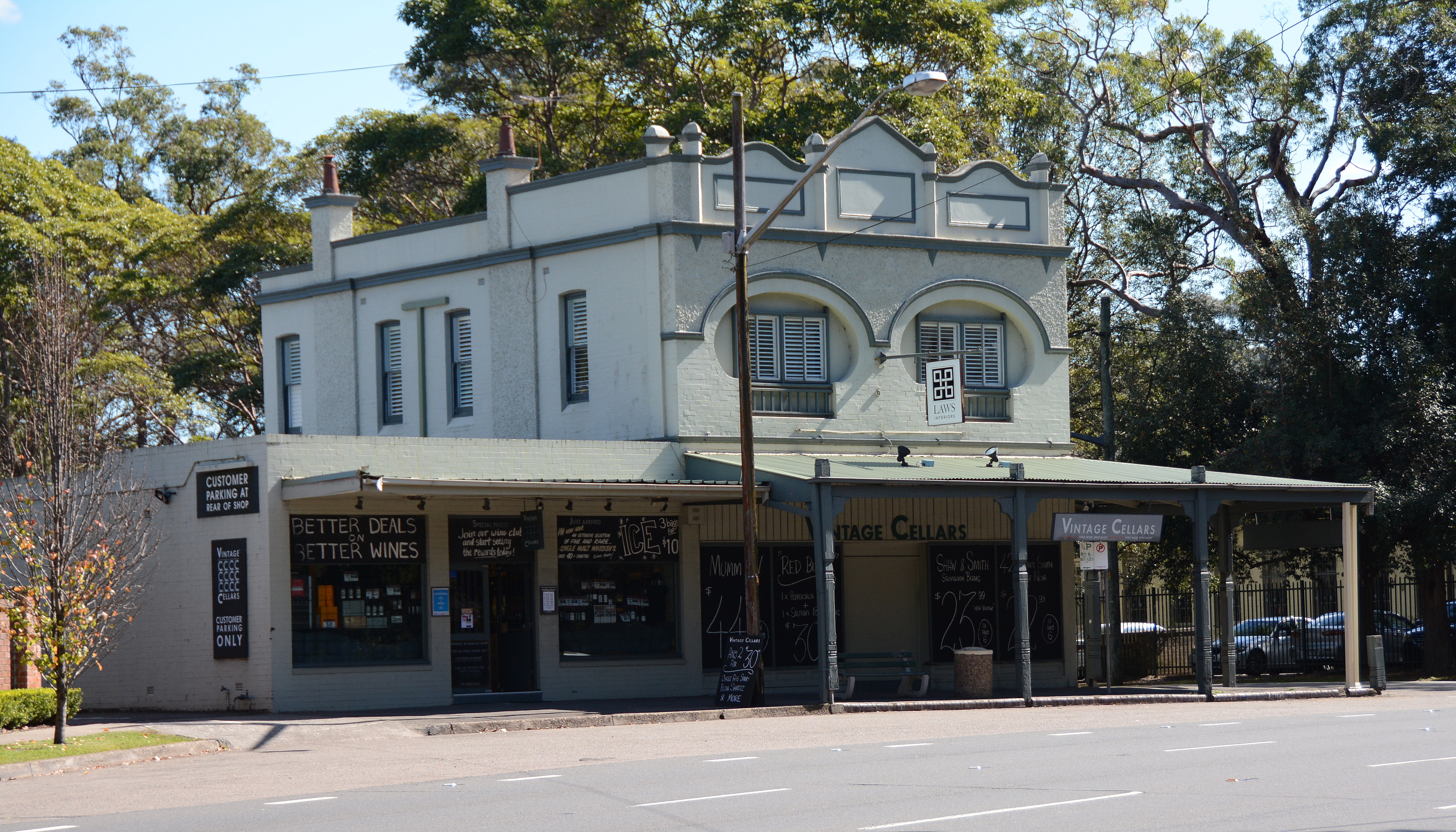
Shops at Beecroft

The majority of commercial activity conducted in Beecroft is concentrated within a couple of blocks. Although not large by Sydney standards, it is nonetheless important in servicing the suburb and its immediate area, including neighbouring suburbs such as Cheltenham and Epping. The commercial area is located between Beecroft Road and Beecroft railway station. In keeping with the spirit of the traditional heritage, Old English is used throughout as the typeset of the Beecroft Village arcade. Hannah Street, the suburb's main commercial street, underwent a significant beautification upgrade in 2005.

As of 2016, a large portion of houses and commercial shops in the block have been knocked down to make room for new units and shops. Beecroft Place (at the corner of Hannah Street and Beecroft Road) was officially opened on 20 September 2017 with a Woolworths supermarket as its anchor tenant.

Beecroft shopping district was one of the first shopping districts in New South Wales to ban the use of plastic bags. This included Woolworths Beecroft to be the first Woolworths Supermarket to ban plastic bags in the state.

== Transport ==
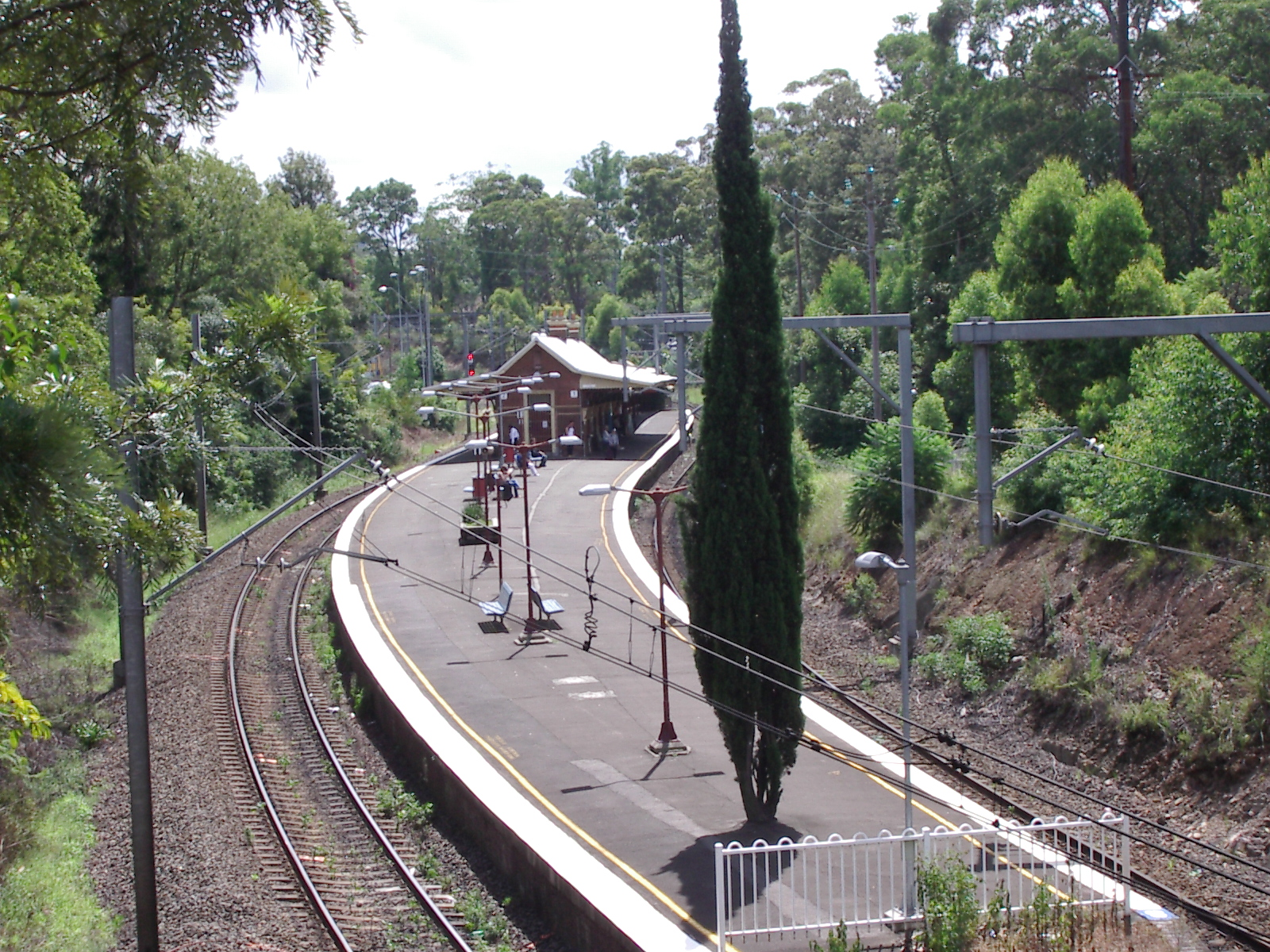
Beecroft railway station

Beecroft railway station is on the Main Northern railway line. In addition to passenger railway traffic, the Main Northern Line also acts as an intercity and freight train thoroughfare passing through Beecroft. Beecroft is also serviced by various bus routes including route 553 operated by Busways and routes 651 and 635 operated by CDC NSW.

Prior to the construction of the M2 Hills Motorway, Beecroft's main road thoroughfare was commissioned as part of Sydney's Metroad system of major arterial roads and throughways. Beecroft Road was part of the Metroad 2 thoroughfare which took motorists between Sydney's Central Business District and Windsor via the Sydney Harbour Bridge, Epping and Castle Hill.

== Churches ==
The Anglican Church was especially prominent in Beecroft society, but the suburb has three churches within its boundaries:

- St John's Anglican Church
- Beecroft Uniting Church
- Beecroft Presbyterian Church

== Education ==
Beecroft has four Primary Schools, an independent Anglican school and a high school on the border of Carlingford:

- Beecroft Public School – established in 1897.
- Roselea Public School
- Epping Heights Public School
- St Gerard Majella Catholic Primary School
- Arden Anglican School
- Carlingford High School

== Sport and recreation ==
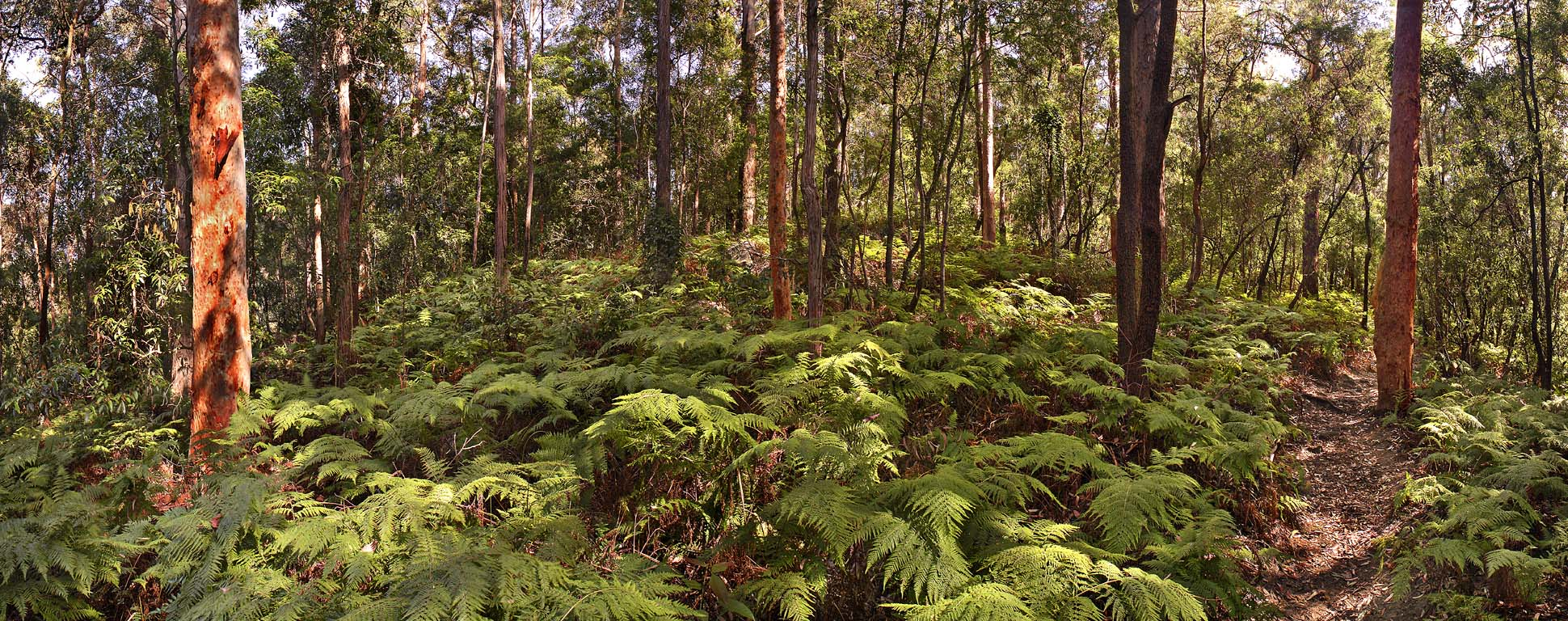
A walking track in the part of Chilworth Reserve known as "Byles Bush", at the end of York Street.

Beecroft has a number of recreational facilities within its boundaries. Beecroft is home to Pennant Hills Golf Club, a lawn bowls club now known as "The Beecroft Club" (previously "Beecroft Bowling and Recreation Club"), a lawn tennis club, as well as general park space at the Village Green, walking trails through Chilworth Reserve and other forested areas. It is also home to the Beecroft Cricket Club

== Population ==
=== Demographics ===
At the 2021 census of Population, there were 10,291 residents living in Beecroft.

Ethnic diversity
60.6% of people were born in Australia. The next most common countries of birth were China 9.3%, India 3.8%, Hong Kong 3.0%, England 2.6% and Korea 2.3%. 61.9% of people only spoke English at home. Other languages spoken at home included Mandarin 11.2%, Cantonese 6.8%, Korean 3.2%, Hindi 1.9% and Tamil 1.6%.
Religion
The most common responses for religious affiliation were No Religion 35.0%, Catholic 18.6% and Anglican 13.6%.
Income
Beecroft has an average weekly household income of $2,962, above the national average of $1,746.
Housing
43.4% of residents own their own home. The average number of people per household was 3.0.

=== Notable residents ===
- Sir Garfield Barwick, Chief Justice of the High Court
- Meredith Burgmann, politician
- Ruth Cracknell AM, actress
- Steve Glasson, bowls player
- Robin Morrow AM, academic and literary critic
- William Nixon, President of Hornsby Shire and architect
- Ellyse Perry, national women's cricket and soccer player
- Leslie Alfred Redgrave, writer, grazier and headmaster, lived from 1923 until 1943 at Bellingara, 109 Copeland Road
- George Sargent, Australian meat pie businessman
