= Johnstons Bay =

Bay in New South Wales, Australia

Coordinates: 33°51′45″S 151°11′28″E

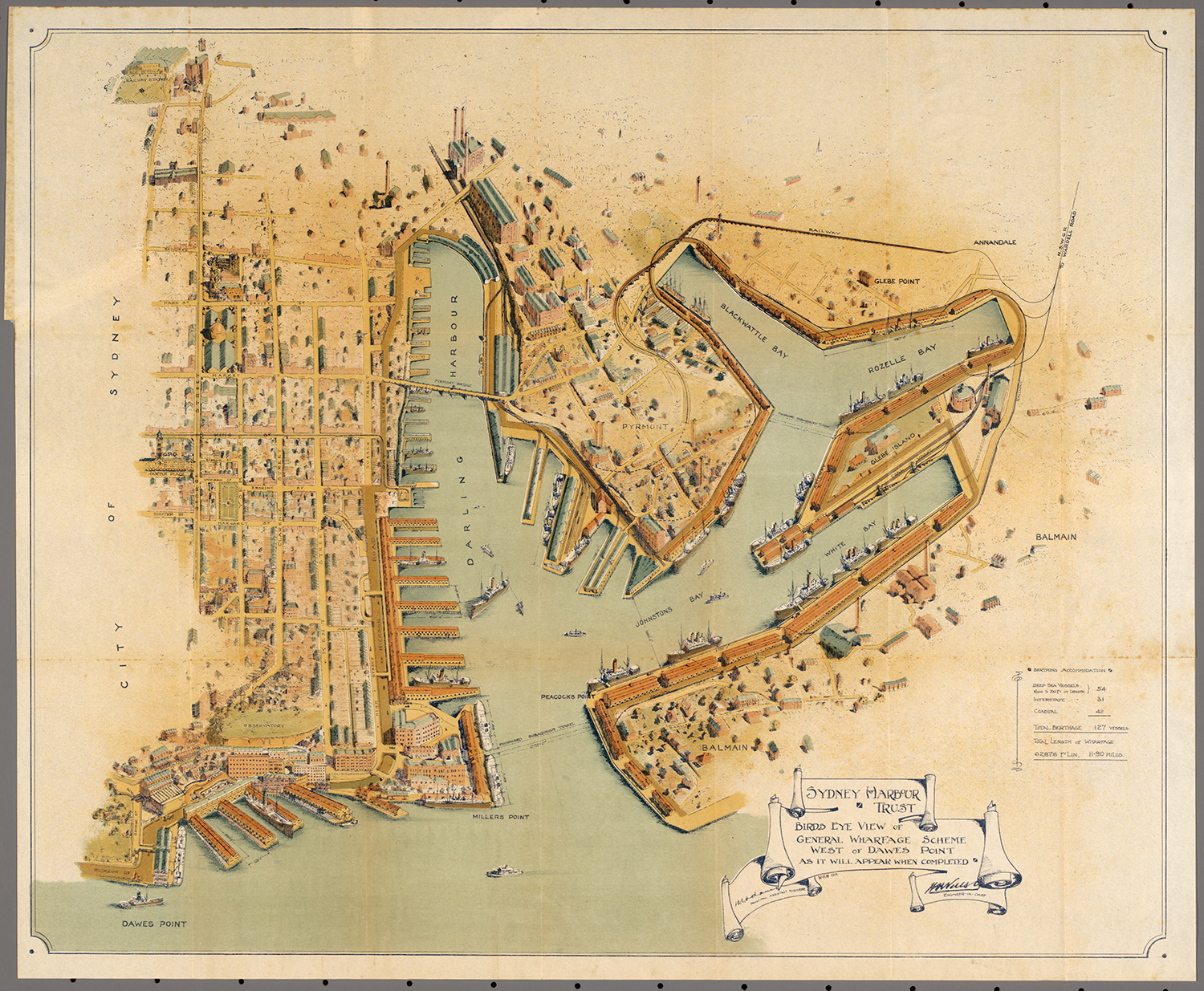
A 1913 plan for wharf development around Johnstons Bay and the other bays that it connects

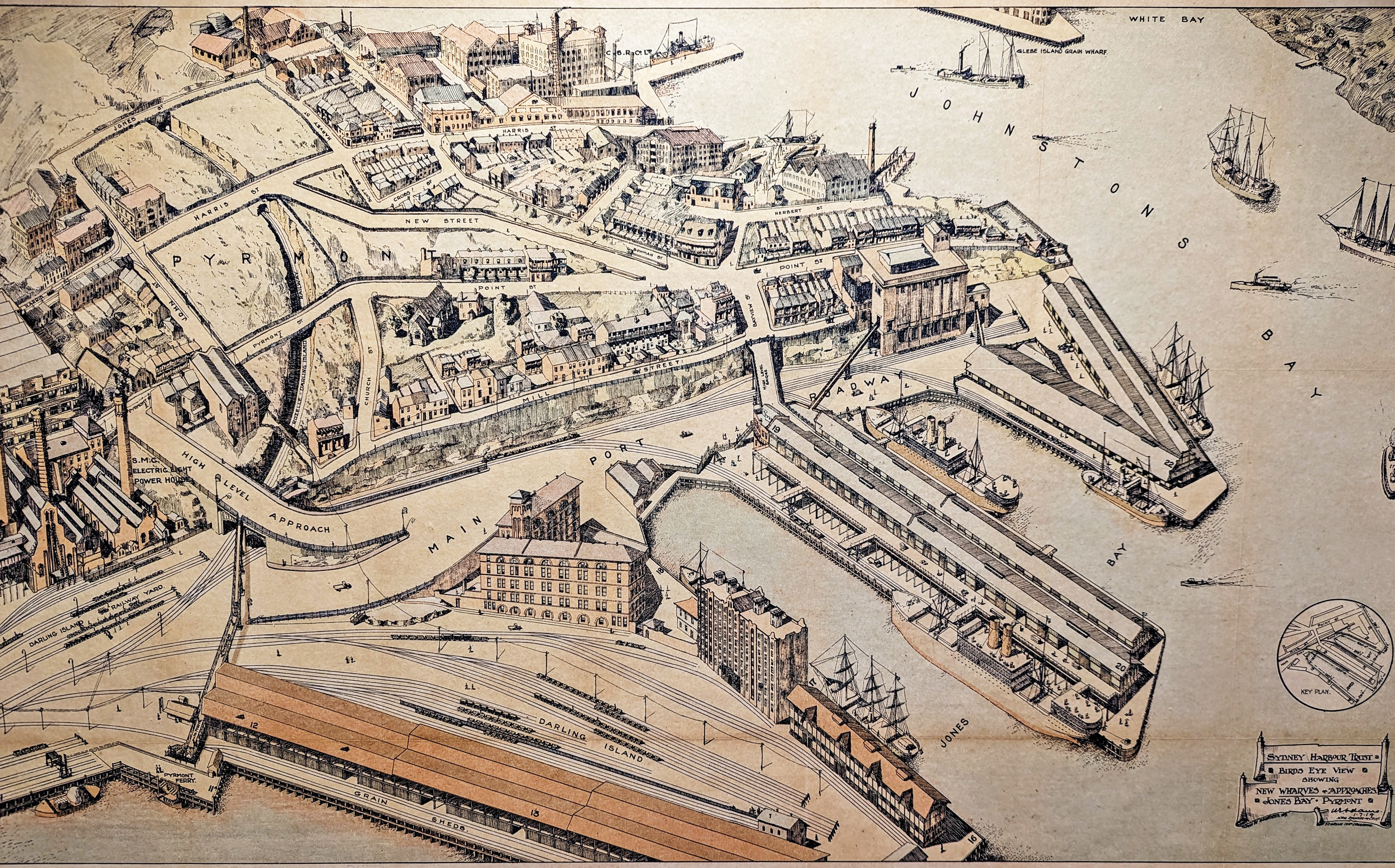
1919 map of Pyrmont waterfront with Johnstons Bay, Pyrmont Power Station, Darling Island, REVY, Jones Bay, and White Bay

Johnstons Bay is a bay of Port Jackson (Sydney Harbour), between Pyrmont and Balmain, Sydney connecting White Bay, Rozelle Bay, Blackwattle Bay, Jones Bay, and Darling Harbour.

Johnstons Bay was first spanned by the Glebe Island Bridge, and later by the Anzac Bridge.

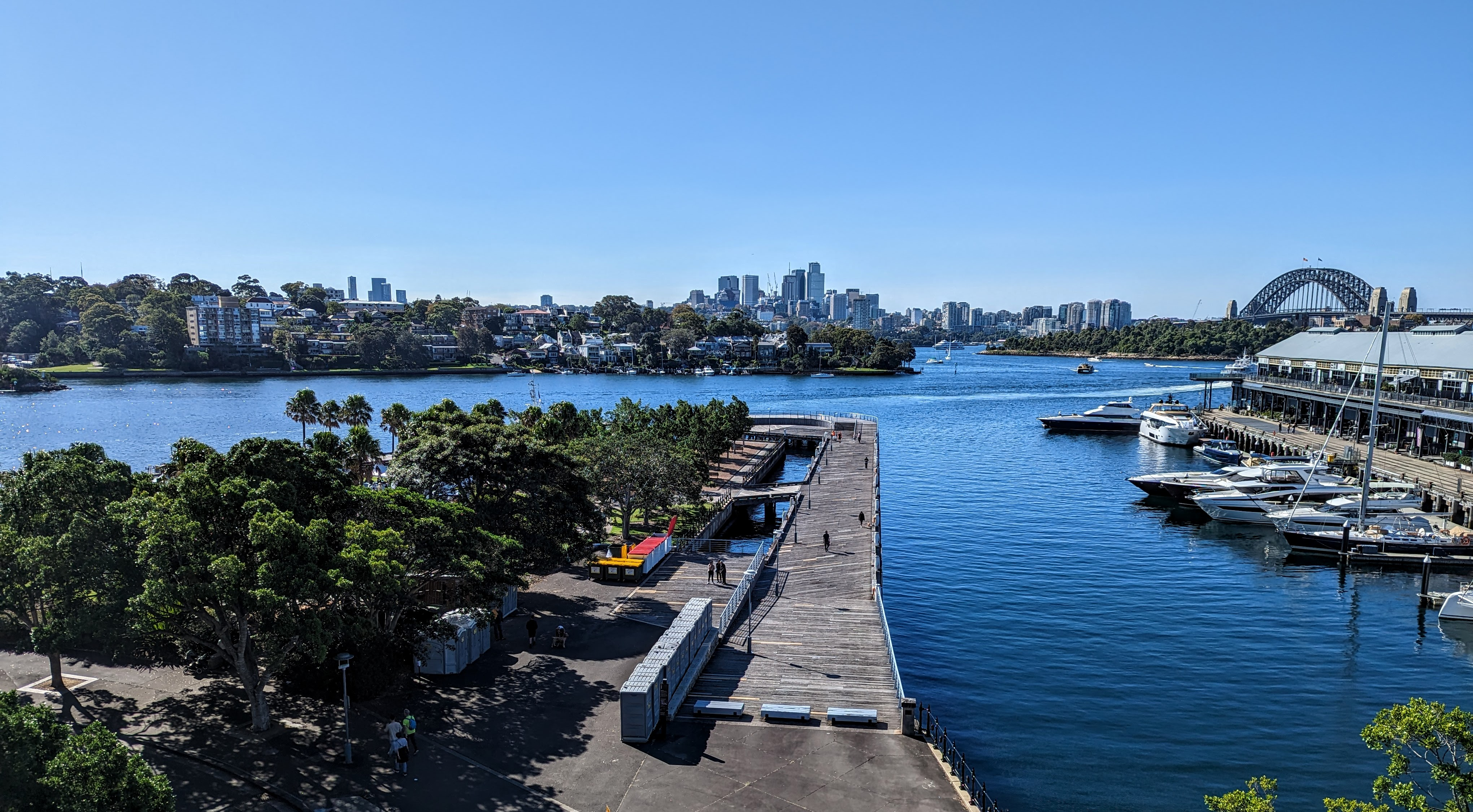
A view across Johnstons Bay from Giba Park, Pyrmont. Pirrama Park in left foreground, Jones Bay Wharf in right foreground. Balmain in left background, Barangaroo Reserve and Sydney Harbour Bridge in right background,.
