= Royal Edward Victualling Yard =

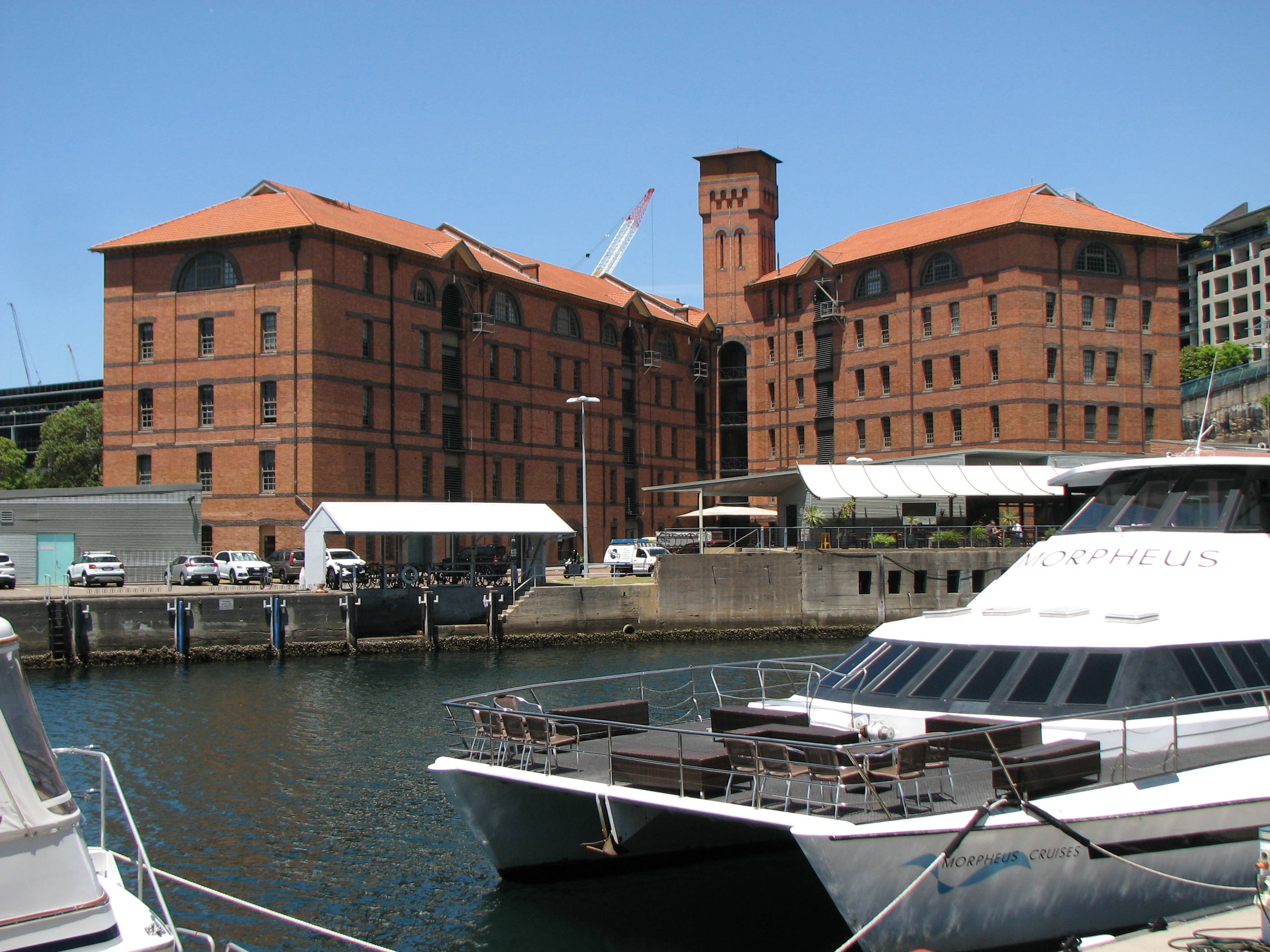
- REVY A and B buildings, 38-42 Pirrama Road, Pyrmont

- Location within Sydney Location within Australia
- 33.8649°S 151.1953°E
- Location: 38-42 Pirrama Road, Pyrmont, City of Sydney, New South Wales, Australia

History
- Built: 1904–1912

Site notes
- Architect(s): Walter Liberty Vernon (Buildings A, B and C)

New South Wales Heritage Register
- Official name: Royal Edward Victualling Yard; Buildings A & B: REVY Main Warehouse; Naval Warehouse; Royal Edward Victualling Yard. Building C: Former Commonwealth Ordnance Stores
- Type: State heritage (complex / group)
- Designated: 22 March 2011
- Reference no.: 1855
- Type: Defence Base Naval
- Category: Defence
- Builders: McLeod Brothers (Buildings A, B); NSW Public Works Department (Bdg C)

The Royal Edward Victualling Yard (REVY) is a heritage-listed former naval victualling yard and warehouses, in the inner city Sydney suburb of Pyrmont in the City of Sydney local government area of New South Wales, Australia. It was designed by Walter Liberty Vernon (Buildings A and B and C) and built from 1904 to 1912 by McLeod Brothers (Buildings A, B) and NSW Public Works Department (Bdg C). The buildings are also known as Buildings A & B: REVY Main Warehouse, Naval Warehouse and Royal Edward Victualling Yard, Building C: Former Commonwealth Ordnance Stores. The property was added to the New South Wales State Heritage Register on 22 March 2011.

Formerly used as the headquarters of the Seven Network, REVY buildings A and B, at 38-42 Pirrama Road, were purchased by Google in 2018. The REVY C building, at 8 Darling Island Road, has been converted to luxury apartments.

== History ==
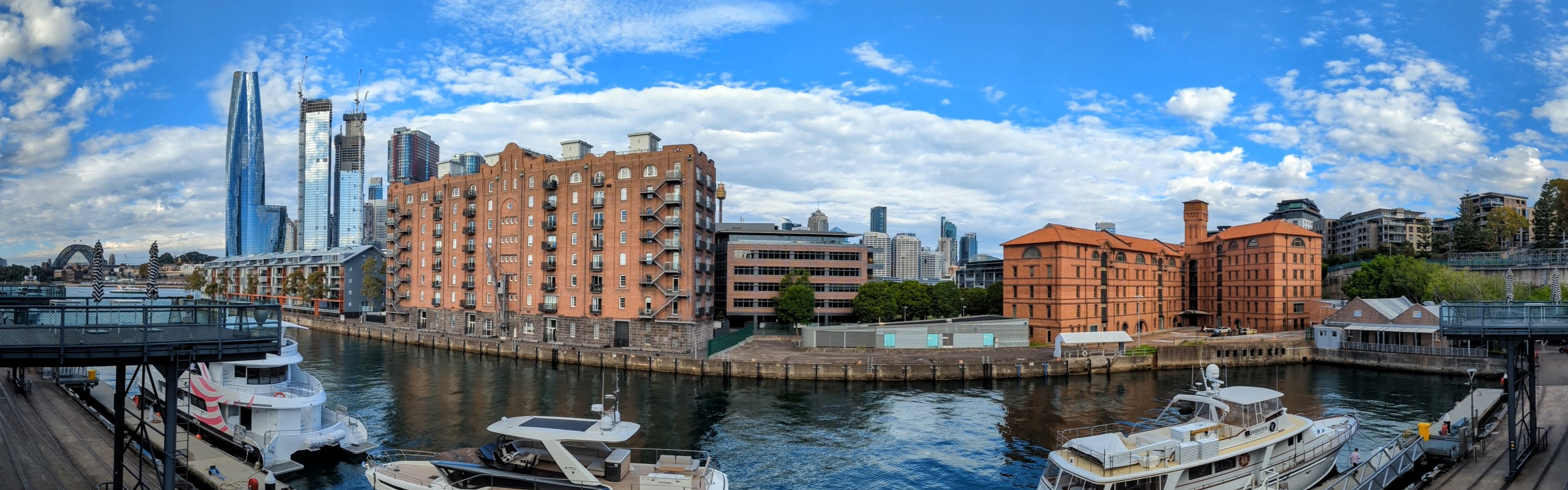
Panoramic view of REVY building C (left) and B and A (right, connected by square tower), from Jones Bay Wharf, Pirrama Road, Pyrmont, in April 2023

=== Indigenous history ===
The Royal Edward Victualling Yard is located on land originally inhabited by the Cadigal people. Their land south of Port Jackson stretched from South Head to Petersham. The coastal Aborigines around Sydney became known to Europeans as the "Eora people". The word Eora means "here" or "from this place". Local Aboriginal people used the word to describe to the British where they came from and so the word was then used to define the Aboriginal people themselves. The people used the harbour for food using fishing line made from the inner bark of the kurrajong and hibiscus trees and multi-pronged spears tipped with bone. The many varieties of fish and shellfish – oysters, mussels, and cockles – were supplemented with vegetables, grubs, birds, possums, wombats and kangaroos. With fish available all year round, there was no need to leave the coast for food. Although the population decreased significantly due to smallpox, the expansion of settlement and several other factors, there is evidence of Aborigines continuing to frequent Pyrmont with its fresh springs up to the 1870s, and even later there are references to ceremonial gatherings at Ultimo.

=== Colonial history ===
The Royal Edward Victualling Yard (REVY) is located on Darling Island, formerly known as Cockle Island. It was originally a rocky knoll attached to the mainland by tidal mud flats. Development started in the Darling Harbour area in the 1810s when Governor Macquarie moved the colony's produce markets to the corner of George and Market Streets, Sydney. This brought with it the need to develop wharves nearby for transportation of goods. As a result, the growth of maritime trade in the area was extensive and included warehouses, stores and other trade buildings. By 1839 Edward Macarthur owned the entire Pyrmont area and subdivided a large portion of it along the waterfront. While many cottages developed there, industrialisation also occurred quickly, including iron works, flour mills and tin smelters. Among these were the Pyrmont works on Darling Island of the Hunter River Steam Navigation Company (HRSN).

HRSN Company was formed in 1839 and started operating in 1846. In the same year Quarry master Charles Saunders was contracted to level Darling Island. In 1851 HRSN Company was renamed the Australian Steam Navigation (ASN) Company. It experienced substantial growth, becoming the largest of the New South Wales (NSW) coastal shipping fleets for a number of decades before being absorbed by overseas interests in the 1890s. In the 1850s the company took out a leasehold on the Pyrmont site. Renovations quickly followed. It was in this same period (1856) that Garden Island was first suggested as a naval base. In 1865 the Colonial Naval Defence Act empowered the states to provide, maintain and operate warships. The following year Garden Island was dedicated as a naval base.

During the 1870s larger ships and cargoes caused the development of longer wharves in the north east of Darling Harbour and at Walsh Bay, prompting the ASN Company to establish a new works at Circular Quay in 1879. By 1884 the Darling Harbour works covered 6.5 acres with a deep water frontage of almost half a mile. The site included a retaining wall on the west, north and south sides of the island which extended from the offices and stores to the foot of the patent slip.

Increasing competition saw the ASN Company begin to struggle in the 1880s. They also suffered a number of shipwrecks. These two factors are believed to have led to their takeover by the Queensland Steam Shipping Company in early 1887. The Darling Island works were not part of the takeover and were offered for sale in 1887. The leasehold was purchased by Edmund Compton Batt who developed plans to establish a meat and wool trading centre on the island. These plans did not eventuate due to the refusal of the Railway Commissioners to extend the existing railway network to Darling Island.

The government purchased Darling Island in 1889 for £135,000 on advice of the Railway Commissioners. Discussions commenced immediately for its use as a trade centre for wool, coal or general cargo. Works on a concrete quay commenced in 1897.

=== 1900 to 1909 ===
The Sydney Harbour Trust was created in 1901 and subsequently took over construction of the concrete wharf. By this time the eastern side of the wharf was being used as a wheat trading area. A long single storey shed running the length of berths 12 to 14 was completed in 1902. In the same year the concrete wharf was completed and the eastern and western sides connected by a timber wharf to the north A shed was built in 1903–04 on the western side of the wharf and another in 1906–07 at the northern end. It was during this period that the existing victualling yards at Garden Island were deemed inadequate for the recently formed Commonwealth Naval Forces. The yards at Garden Island had originally been developed to replace the nineteenth century use of store ships.

Several sites were considered for the victualling yard. After discussions with the NSW Government the then Commander-in Chief of the Navy, Vice Admiral Fanshawe, suggested Darling Harbour. The decision was then made to build on the mainland. The new storage accommodation would have a floor space of 7,400 square metres (80,000 sq ft) together with a receiving and issuing store, officers, cooperage and a workshop. It was noted years later that the buildings were constructed specifically to meet the needs of the victualling service, particularly in regard to natural lighting, ventilation, storage and expeditious and convenient handling of stores.

After some negotiation Walter Liberty Vernon was commissioned to undertake the design of the buildings. Tenders were called for their construction in 1905. It was won by McLeod Bros. The victualling stores were subsequently constructed on the western side of Darling Island from 1905. This original construction included REVY A and B buildings. A one and two storey weatherboard and stucco building was constructed south of where REVY C is now located and was probably an office block. Other buildings included a receiving shed, cooperage and workshop. All these buildings were designed by Government Architect Walter Liberty Vernon between 1890 and 1911.

The new stores were completed in late 1906 or early 1907 and represented some of the earliest public works by the new Commonwealth Government. in July 1906 Rear Admiral WH Fawkes, officer in Charge made a request to the Admiralty that the new stores be officially renamed the Royal Edward Victualling Yard. The request was granted in January 1907, ensuring that the stores became the first Royal Yard in the southern hemisphere and the Navy's major store depot. The Victualling Stores were transferred from Garden Island to REVY on 23 February 1907. They officially became the new headquarters of the victualling department of the Imperial Naval Authority on a permanent lease on 1 June 1907. An inventory in 1907 listed the yard as containing Buildings A and B (stores), a cooperage, slades, police guard room, electricians workshop, two garages, kitchen, Officers Dining Room, two floor office block containing a yard pattern room, seamstress room, and carpenters workshop. There were also yard craft accommodated on the waterfront. These included two work boats, a passenger launch and two well lighters.

The Navy would continue to maintain some stores on Garden Island and constructed additional storehouses on Cockatoo Island in 1919. Other storehouses were built at Spectacle Island, although REVY continued to be the main major store depot. Later, like other industries in the area, REVY was reliant on water transport from the nineteenth century. This was not to change for over sixty years. A new entrance from Jones Bay Road was proposed in 1927. Land was leased from the Sydney Harbour Trust Commissioners for the purpose.

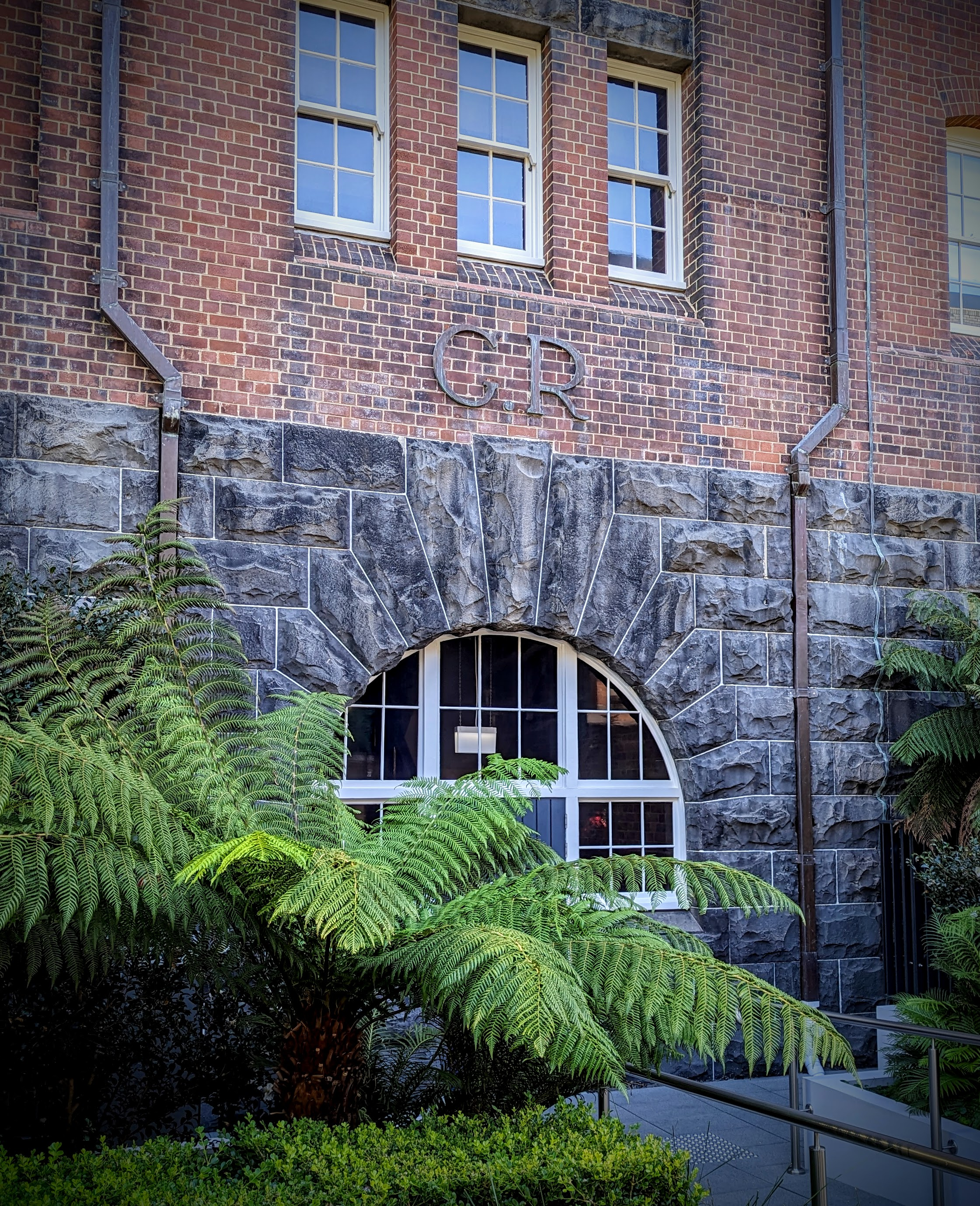
REVY C is marked above the door G.R for Georgius Rex, George V

In 1907 a contract was agreed upon for pile driving and other preparations for the construction of new buildings on Darling Island. Plans were prepared in 1909 and in 1912 the eight-story ordinance store (REVY C) was completed. Intended to provide storage for the Military and Postal Departments, it bore the insignia of King George V who succeeded the throne in 1910 rather than that of King Edward was borne by the yard generally.

REVY C was not originally part of the REVY Yard. Instead, it was used by a variety of government departments such as the postal department. It was often referred to as the Commonwealth stores. In 1911 the title Royal Australian Navy (RAN) was granted to the Commonwealth Naval Forces. However, naval establishments, including REVY were not transferred to the Commonwealth of Australia until 1913. The cable storage tanks that were used by the Post Master Generals Department to store cables underwater are still in evidence on the ground floor of the building. The cables, designed and fabricated for underwater use, were stored in a cable trench until required.

REVY C was one of the last buildings designed by Vernon as Government Architect and is one of only a few surviving warehouses designed by Vernon. Other surviving buildings include the Bushells warehouse in the Rocks and the REVY A and B warehouses. The construction of REVY C also represented an early provision for fire safety in tall buildings. Early fire fighting services could only reach two storeys and below as steam pumped water pressure could only reach a certain height effectively. As a result, tall buildings needed to provide their own fire fighting equipment and access points. Vernon's consideration for fire safety is evident in REVY C by the external fire escape stairs at each end of the building, a rarity in Sydney at the time.

REVY C's reinforced concrete floors and roofs, and concrete encased steel columns also improved fire resistance. John Sulman and James Nangle were advocating fire resistant building construction in the 1890s. Nangle advocated brick construction as masonry, with as little timber as possible was considered to have superior fire resistance. Reinforced concrete was also a good construction material for fire resistant purposes. Vernon and the government architects office designed some of the earliest reinforced concrete structures in Sydney. The first was constructed in Australia in 1895 and they were common in Melbourne by 1912.

=== 1910 to 1960s ===
The completion of the REVY C building resulted in the creation of a near continuous wall on the western edge of Darling Island formed by Building E (Weatherboard and stucco building), REVY C and the Birt & Co Cargo Shed. REVY C with its length and slenderness made a significant contribution to the wall effect. Together the buildings enclosed the eastern side of Jones Bay that would reopen as the buildings north and south of REVY C were removed. REVY C also became the tallest building on Darling Island.

Although it is not clear when the REVY C building was completely taken over by the military, it was probably during World War One. The Royal Australian Navy took it over in 1923. The REVY C building became the main storage facility for the RAN, playing an instrumental role in the provision of supplies during World War Two. An arrangement had been made in the 1930s that in the event of an outbreak of war, wharf 16, located immediately to the north of REVY C on the western side of Darling Island, would be handed over to the Navy for Victualling purposes. Both materials and troops were shipped from Darling Island during the war years.

The main function of the yard was to act as a support system providing food, clothing, and other equipment when required. Food was to be of high quality and nutritious, and all other items of a predictable and uniform standard. When the yard became the responsibility of the Australian Navy in 1913 it became imperative to work out how the yard could continue to supply the China and East Indies Stations with the many items purchased in Sydney, including coal, boats, timber, vegetables, fresh and corned meat, salt, clothing and other commodities. This generated the need to install the cloth inspection equipment. In 1925 two overhead travellers and differential lifting gear were installed in the ground floor of Revy C for handling heavy packages and the stowage of items such as Electric Cables and Mine Sweeping gear.

In REVY A and B the electric goods hoists are among the first to be installed in Sydney and are believed to be possibly the only set of hoists of their type to survive. They are remnants of technologies once common throughout Sydney. The goods lift at the northern end of building AB was one of the oldest functioning lifts in Sydney until its decommissioning some time in the late twentieth century. It is indicative of the type installed in Sydney in the early 20th century. The goods aprons are prominent archaeological features which indicate the way in which the building operated. The hydraulics system, including a hydraulic press is one of the few intact examples of an essentially 19th century technology.

From 1937 a large amount of work was done to the grain wharf on the eastern side of Darling Island and provisions increased for refrigerated goods and other general cargo. By the 1940s the work of the yard included provisions and meat for the Royal Navy - Middle East and War Board, India, clothing and footwear examination sections and associated activities, pattern and sample room, survey of stores by HMA ships, receiving, opening and checking despatch, general provisioning of clothing, food, bedding, a variety of implements and repair and maintenance.

Removal of the victualling yard from Darling Harbour was discussed in the 1930s, 1940s and 1950s. However, arguments regarding the quality of the facility, its efficiency, the benefits of being located on the mainland, the ongoing successes of the stores, its potential role in the event of an emergency and the availability of fresh water all contributed to the prevention of the yards closure.

The grain wharf and its sheds became obsolete due to the increasing size of cargo ships and the introduction of container shipping. The introduction of container shipping drastically altered the way ships loaded and unloaded goods. A ship's cargo could be stored away from the waterfront in the containers and transported by road or rail to the waterfront for loading onto ships specially designed to handle containers. The first regular international container services were introduced into Australia in 1969. A large passenger terminal replaced the 1902 grain storage shed in 1951 and the terminal was remodelled in 1968–69. Both cargo sheds originally constructed for Birt and Co were demolished around this time. The first of these was the 1907 northern shed demolished between 1951 and 1955. The 1903-04 two storey shed was demolished between 1968 and 1970. A section of the seawall on the eastern side of the wharf collapsed in 1970 and was substantially reconstructed.

=== 1970s to the present ===
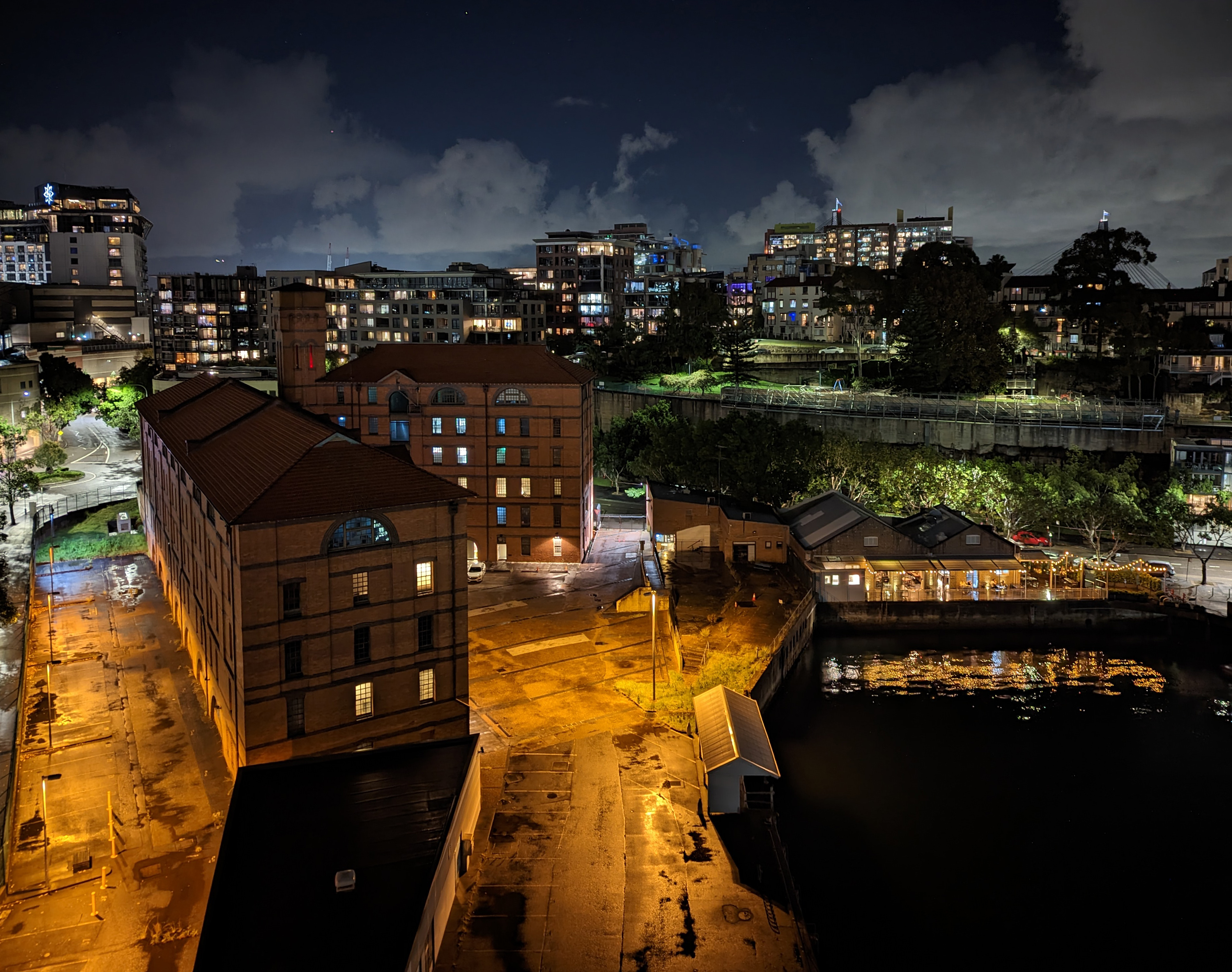
REVY B and A buildings from REVY C rooftop; with REVY Food and Wine reflected in the water of Jones Bay.

REVY ceased functioning as a victualling yard for the RAN during the 1970s, mainly due to the advent of containerism in shipping. It had become the RAN's largest victualling yard and had played a significant role in every operation entered into by the RAN and the wharf areas to the north were cleared and all small sheds demolished. In the late 1970s plans were made to the refurbishment of the site. The original one and two storey weatherboard and stucco building to the south of REVY C was demolished and REVY C remodelled for tenant use.

During the 1980s REVY C underwent major refurbishment to accommodate the Department of Defence, Defence Science and Technology Organisation. Later, REVY A and B were refitted for office accommodation by clerical and technical staff of the Naval Support Command. In 1995 the works to Revy A and B received a Merit Award in the 1995 Royal Australian Institute of Architects Awards in the Adaptive Re-use Category of the Greenway Conservation Section for being a fine example of creative and effective engineering input into the refurbishment of an important heritage building. Works included the construction of the glass atrium linking Revy A and B. The finished product was described as an excellent and splendid example of collaboration between the structural engineers and the heritage architects.

The final Royal Australian Navy occupants relocated from REVY A and B during 2002, leaving the buildings vacant. In 2003 the REVY site was sold by the Commonwealth as freehold land, although the Commonwealth continued to occupy REVY C until 2005. REVY A and B underwent works in 2003–04 to be adaptively reused as television station offices.

== Description ==
The former Royal Edward Victualling Yard is located in an historic waterfront location on the southern shore of Sydney Harbour at Pyrmont. The height of the buildings and their unusual spatial arrangement result in a dramatic landmark amongst a mixture of historic and recent residential and commercial developments, many of which are on a large scale themselves. A community park opposite the site creates a visual corridor through to the harbour east of the site. The verticality and dramatic waterfront location invests REVY A, B and C with landmark qualities and aesthetic significance. REVY C, the tallest building at Darling Island and on the eastern foreshore of Pyrmont, it is a prominent landmark visible from surrounding vantage points at Sydney Harbour and contrasts with the lower and elongated wharf structures such as Jones Bay Wharf.

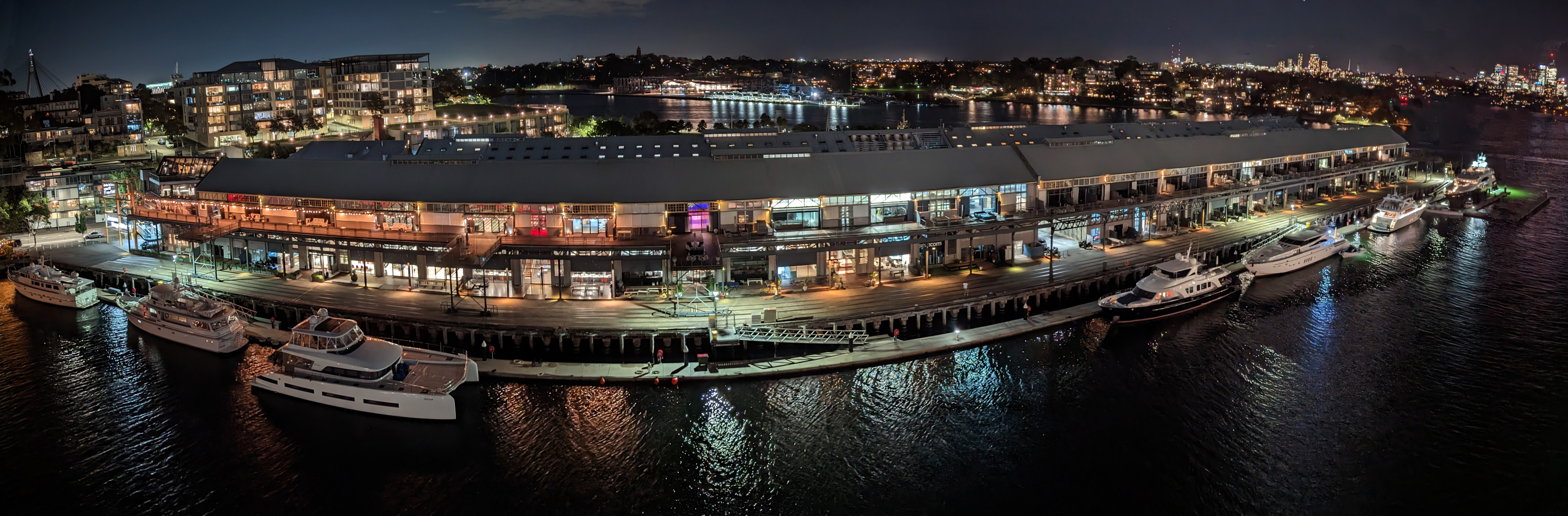
Jones Bay Wharf, night panoramic view from the REVY C rooftop

Revy A and B are a pair of large warehouses, consisting of a five-storey block and a six-storey block linked by a square central tower topped by a water reservoir tower of Romanesque design. The blocks and tower are of polychromatic brick with terracotta-tiled, gable hipped roof and exposed rafters at the eaves. Internally, the buildings are constructed with massive timber columns and beams supporting timber floors. Windows in the blocks are rectangular and multi-paned except for the upper floor where Diocletian arched, multi-pane windows are used. The two blocks are sited at an acute angle to one another, joining at the tower, with interconnections between each floor set through the tower section. The face brickwork and large massing of the buildings, together with the arches, indicate aspects of Federation Warehouse styling, although the roof is not characteristic of the style. Items of goods handling and lifting equipment remain in the buildings, including the wall-mounted jib cranes and facade doors.

Revy C is an eight-storey, concrete encased steel framed brick building, rectangular in plan. It features Flemish style gabled parapets and a rusticated ashlar bluestone ground floor. There are Diocletian arched window openings to the upper floor (rectangular windows to the other floors), all with multiple panes. Four prominent lift towers are visible above the roofline, located symmetrically. On the lower level, attached to the western facade, is a riveted truss jib crane installed shortly after the completion of the building. The mass, rectangularity and arched upper windows hint at Federation Warehouse styling, while the rounded gables are a suggestion of Federation Anglo Dutch influence. External steel fire stairs are visually prominent.

The combined seawall and wharf which surrounds Darling Island is made from concrete blocks laid on bedrock about 8 m below mean tide. The seawall was built to a height of 650 mm above low water and finished to wharf level with massed concrete which is visible today both on the horizontal and vertical edges of the wharf. The edge of the wharf was capped with a squared timber curb. The curb was made from broad-axed lengths of hardwood bolted to the wharf edge to form an almost continual low barrier.

Six massive cast iron or cast steel bollards are bolted to concrete platforms behind the curb at about 15 metre intervals. Opposite the western facade of REVY C are two small double-post bollards. These are placed in gaps in the curb to allow access for mooring lines. The wharf has no piles to which head stocks could be attached, so vertical posts were bolted to the concrete wall at about 4.8 m centres and two hardwood whalers run the length of the wharf, attached to the posts.

A number of relics associated with the victualling function are extant within the yard, including hoists, lifts, cloth inspection equipment and a crane. (Design 5, GML, Cox)

=== Condition ===
As at 24 February 2011, the buildings are in good condition.

=== Modifications and dates ===
- 1925 – lifting gear added to REVY C
- 1981 – REVY C refurbished for DSTO
- 1994 – REVY A and B converted to office accommodation
- 2000+ – REVY A and B converted for commercial use; REVY C vacated and some of the more recent fitout removed
- 2015 – REVY C refurbished as luxury apartments "The REVY".

== Heritage listing ==
As at 22 November 2010, the Royal Edward Victualling Yard (REVY) has state significance as the first Royal Yard in the southern hemisphere. It is a reminder of the importance given to the presence of the Commonwealth Naval Forces in the southern hemisphere, and the subsequent growth and development of the Commonwealth Forces and the Royal Australian Navy in the region. The presence of equipment associated with the victualling functions extant within the yard and buildings including hoists, lifts, cloth manufacturing machines and a crane are also strong reminders of the sites functions. The stores operated during both World Wars and played an instrumental role in the provision of supplies during World War Two. The narrow, vertical Federation Warehouse buildings designed by Walter Liberty Vernon are a fine example of a style of building, design features and commercial activity now rare on and around the waterways of central Sydney. They are also fine examples of largely intact Federation warehousing.

Royal Edward Victualling Yard was listed on the New South Wales State Heritage Register on 22 March 2011 having satisfied the following criteria.

The place is important in demonstrating the course, or pattern, of cultural or natural history in New South Wales.

The REVY site has state historical significance as some of the earliest major public works commissioned by the Commonwealth Government in its first decade of administration. The buildings have important historic links to the early growth of the Royal Australian Navy and as its major provisioning facility for two world wars. It was the first naval yard in the southern hemisphere to be granted the title "Royal" and was intimately associated with the formative years and growth of the Royal Australian Navy.

The complex has local historical significance as one of the first Sydney warehouse facilities to be electrified (1906) and are an example of the reliance on water transport and the importance of the Darling Harbour Area to industry and transport in the late nineteenth century and the first 60–70 years of the twentieth century before containerisation drastically altered the way shipping was handled.

REVY C - demonstrates the expansion of the complex over time. For some time after construction it was one of the tallest buildings on the southern central Sydney waterfront .

The place has a strong or special association with a person, or group of persons, of importance of cultural or natural history of New South Wales's history.

The REVY buildings are state significant for their association with their architect, Walter Liberty Vernon, Government Architect 1890-1911 and the activities of the newly formed Commonwealth government in the early years of the twentieth century. The site also has state associational significance with the Royal Australian Navy and its Commonwealth Forces predecessor for its continuous association with naval and defence purposes for a century from 1903 to 2003. The stores represent the size and complexity of naval victualling supply functions and the growth of this activity over time and have associations with the growth of the Post Master General's Department and the expansion of communications.

The place is important in demonstrating aesthetic characteristics and/or a high degree of creative or technical achievement in New South Wales.

The REVY complex has aesthetic and technical significance at a state level. Their occupation of an historic waterfront location and the height of the buildings and their unusual spatial arrangement results in a dramatic landmark composition on the southern shore of Sydney Harbour. The large, richly coloured, finely modelled, brick masonry stores buildings are fine examples of the Federation Warehouse style designed by Walter Liberty Vernon. The tallest building at Darling Island and on the eastern foreshore of Pyrmont, REVY C in particular is a prominent landmark visible from surrounding vantage points at Sydney Harbour and contrasts with the lower and elongated wharf structures such as Jones Bay Wharf.

REVY includes elements such as a wall crane, hoists, loading bays, platforms and lift works which demonstrate the process of moving goods in and out of the building. Early gantry rails and underground cable water tanks also demonstrate the purpose of the building and emphasising the changes taking place in building technology in the early twentieth century. It also exhibits the rare external fire escapes which are design features at each end of the west facade. Likewise, some surviving fabric manufacturing equipment demonstrates the purpose of Revy A and B and the evolution in these technologies. Together, the three buildings demonstrate vertical store handing prior to containerisation in their external configuration.

The place has a strong or special association with a particular community or cultural group in New South Wales for social, cultural or spiritual reasons.

Low staff turnover and long periods of service mean the site has state social significance for the many naval personnel across the state who have worked at the site or had a long association with the Victualling Branch of the Royal Australian Navy up to the 1970s.

The place has potential to yield information that will contribute to an understanding of the cultural or natural history of New South Wales.

The narrow vertical warehouse style of the buildings is now rare in Sydney, has the ability to demonstrate vertical store handling.

In REVY A and B the electric goods hoists are among the first to be installed in Sydney and are possibly the only set of such hoists to survive. They provide opportunities to study remnants of technologies once common throughout Sydney as do other technologies such as the goods lift at the northern end of REVY A, was one of the oldest functioning lifts in Sydney until the late twentieth century. It is indicative of the type installed in Sydney in the early 20th century. The goods aprons are also prominent archaeological features which indicate the way in which the building operated. The hydraulics system, including a hydraulic press is one of the few examples of an essentially 19th century technology.

The place possesses uncommon, rare or endangered aspects of the cultural or natural history of New South Wales.

The REVY buildings remain rare examples of multistorey dockside warehouses. A waterfront warehouse building of the height of Revy C is now rare in Sydney. The Revy C building fire stairs are not only evidence of an early solution to fire safety, but are also a rare solution in Sydney. It also exhibits the rare external fire escapes which are design features at each end of the west facade. It also exhibits fine brick masonry modelling and is an excellent example of the warehouse design work of the government architect of the period, Walter Liberty Vernon.

The buildings are a rare surviving example of a waterside naval store. The application of containerism has removed the need for waterside facilities such as warehouses and of those that remain, the REVY buildings are rare masonry structures which maintain their association with the waterfront. They are one of the few warehouses designed by Vernon.

The place is important in demonstrating the principal characteristics of a class of cultural or natural places/environments in New South Wales.

REVY A, B and C are excellent representative examples of narrow, vertical Federation style warehouses and are typical of buildings constructed between c. 1910 and c. 1918 with their load bearing masonry external walls, reinforced concrete floors and reinforced flat concrete roof.

The buildings are representative of waterfront warehousing technology employed in the early part of the 20th century as are the various remnant technologies still present.

== See also ==
- List of former military installations in New South Wales
  - Media related to Royal Edward Victualling Yard at Wikimedia Commons
