= Jacksons Landing =

Coordinates: 33°52′30″S 151°11′47″E

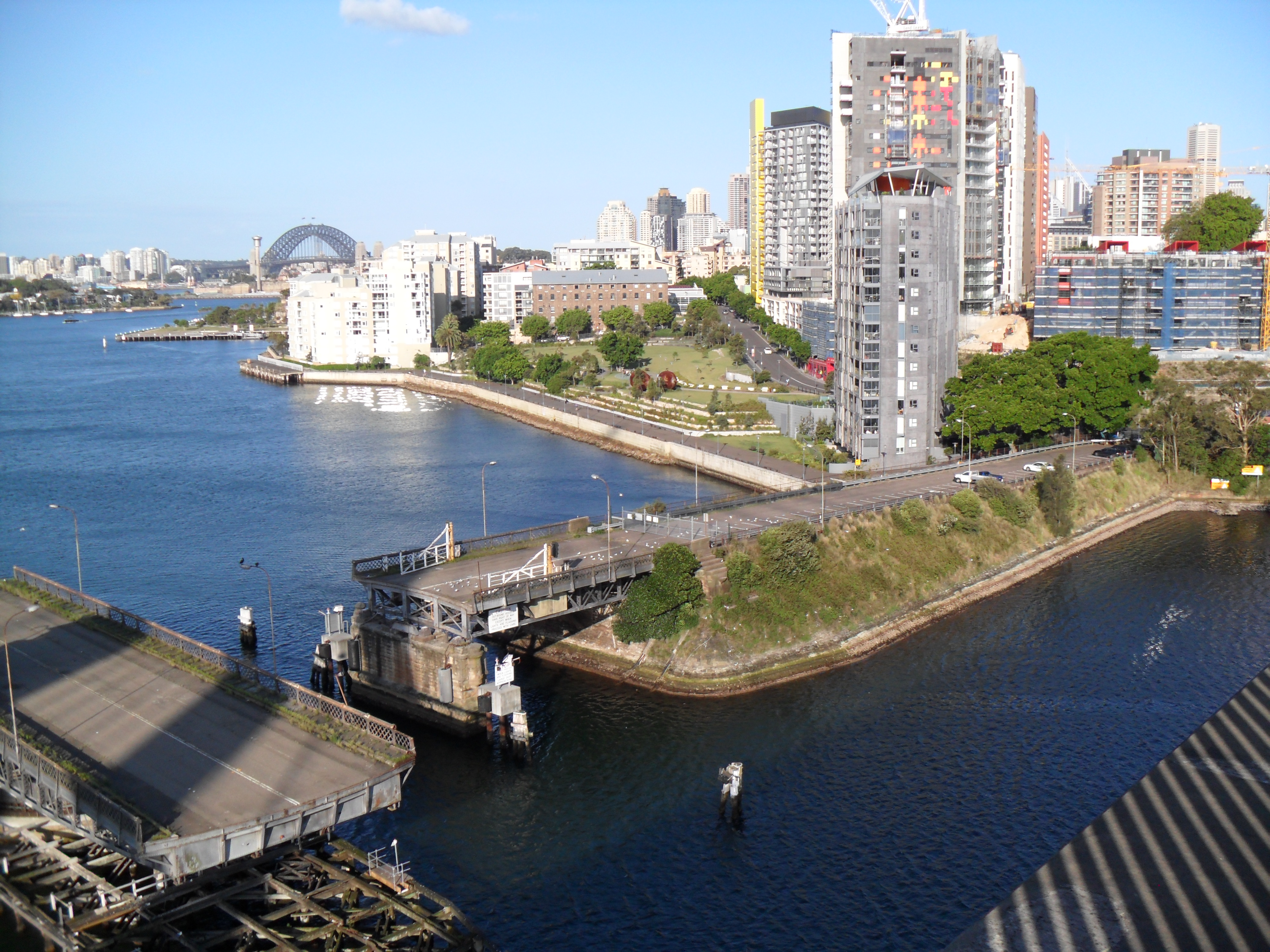
Jacksons Landing with the old Glebe Island Bridge in foreground, viewed from Anzac Bridge

Jacksons Landing is a residential and commercial property development located on the northern peninsula of Pyrmont, an inner suburb of Sydney, Australia. It is located on the former site of a major sugar refinery which was operated by CSR Limited and was developed by Lendlease, a well-known real estate developer.

== Overview ==
Jacksons Landing is one of a number of planned communities which have become popular in Australia. These developments are based on the idea of offering a package of houses, apartments, open space and community facilities such as pools, gyms and tennis courts.

High density inner-city developments such as Jacksons Landing are seen as one solution to the problem of urban sprawl in Sydney. The main residential towers are Quarry and Distillery (designed by Denton Corker Marshall), Evolve, Stonecutters (designed by Alec Tzannes), Sugardock (designed by Francis-Jones Morehen Thorp) and the adjacent Silk.

== See also ==
- Exclusive buyer agent
