= Pyrmont, New South Wales =

Pyrmont
- Suburb
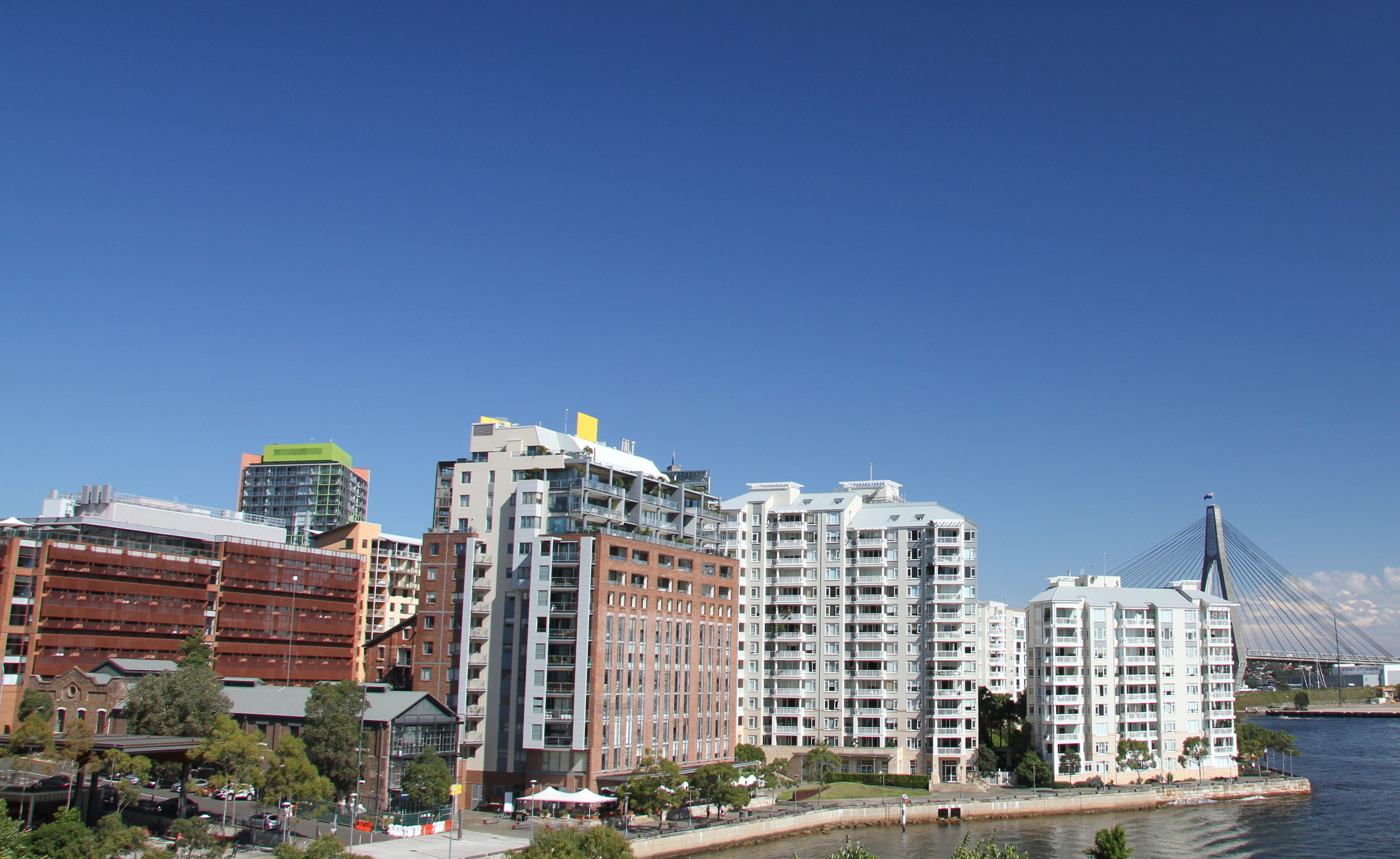
- Pyrmont from Pirrama Park

- Interactive map of Pyrmont
- Coordinates: 33°52′30″S 151°11′47″E
- Country: Australia
- State: New South Wales
- City: Sydney
- LGA: City of Sydney
- Location: 2 km (1.2 mi) west of Sydney CBD

Government
  - State electorate: Sydney
  - Federal division: Sydney

Area
  - Total: 0.93 km^{2} (0.36 sq mi)
- Elevation: 26 m (85 ft)

Population
  - Total: 12,658 (SAL 2021)
  - Density: 13,611/km^{2} (35,250/sq mi)
- Postcode: 2009
- Parish: St Andrew
Suburbs around Pyrmont
| Balmain | Balmain East | Millers Point |
| Rozelle | Pyrmont | Darling Harbour |
| Glebe | Ultimo | Haymarket |

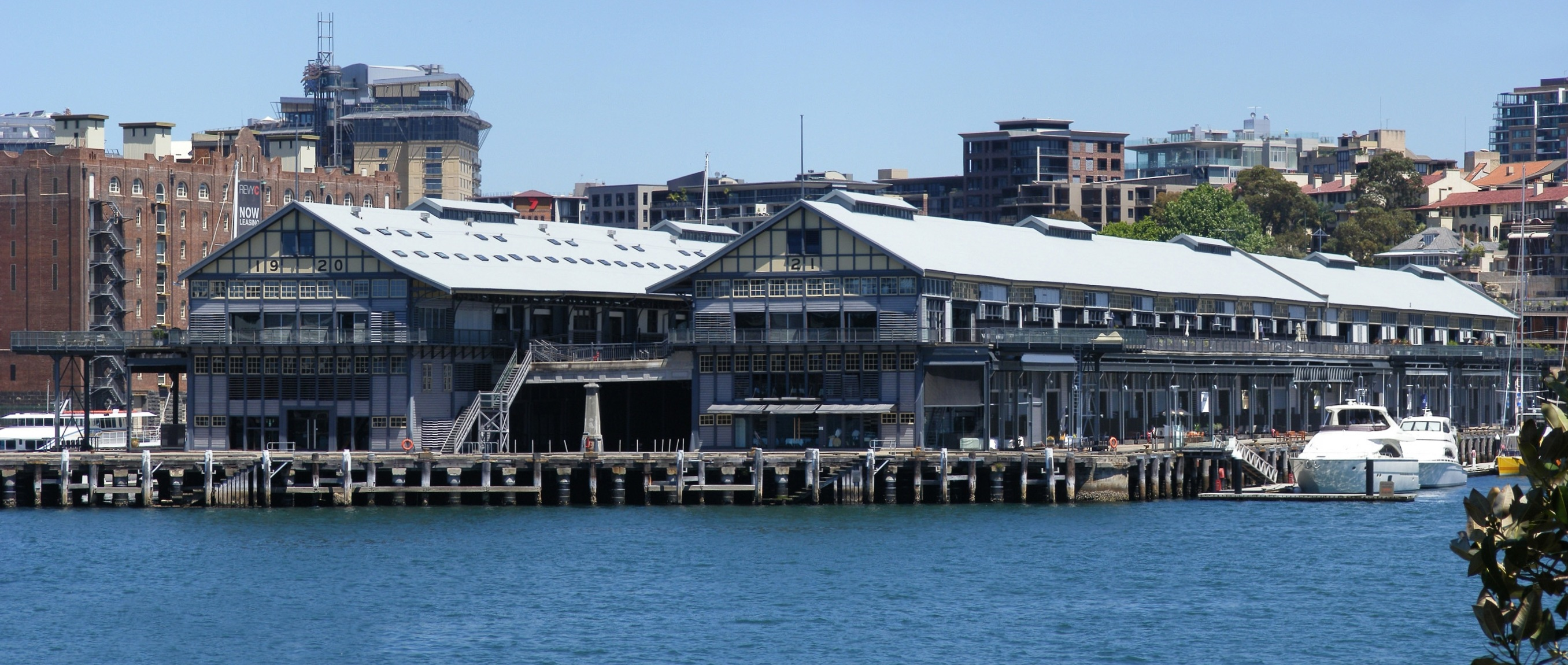
Pyrmont wharves

Pyrmont (/pɪərmɒnt/) is an inner-city suburb of Sydney, in the state of New South Wales, Australia 2 kilometres south-west of the Sydney central business district in the local government area of the City of Sydney. It is also part of the Darling Harbour region.

Aboriginal culture Before European settlement the Eora tribe of Indigenous Australians inhabited the area. Their Aboriginal name for this area was 'Pirrama', which is still the name of a road on the Pyrmont waterfront.

Pyrmont was once a vital component of Sydney's industrial waterfront, with wharves, shipbuilding yards, factories and woolstores. As industry moved out, the population and the area declined. In recent years it has experienced redevelopment with an influx of residents and office workers.

== History ==
The name of the area in the indigenous Dharug language is Pirrama.

Pyrmont contained a mineral spring of cold water bubbling out of a rock and was thus named for a similar natural spring in Bad Pyrmont, close to Hanover, Germany. Thomas Jones was granted 55 acres (22 ha) of land on the peninsula in 1795. Land was sold to Obadiah Ikin in 1796 for 10 pounds, which he then sold to Captain John Macarthur in 1799 for a gallon of rum.

Pyrmont was the site of quarries from a fairly early stage because of the quality of the sandstone. Charles Saunders, licensee of the Quarryman's Arms hotel, became the biggest quarrymaster, with three quarries established in the area from 1853. The work was continued by his son and grandson till circa 1931. The quarries were nicknamed Paradise, Purgatory and Hell Hole by the Scottish workers employed by Saunders. Steam-powered equipment was used there for the first time in Australia. The sandstone was used in many of the most significant buildings in Sydney. Saunders Street, near the site of the Paradise quarry, was named after Saunders.

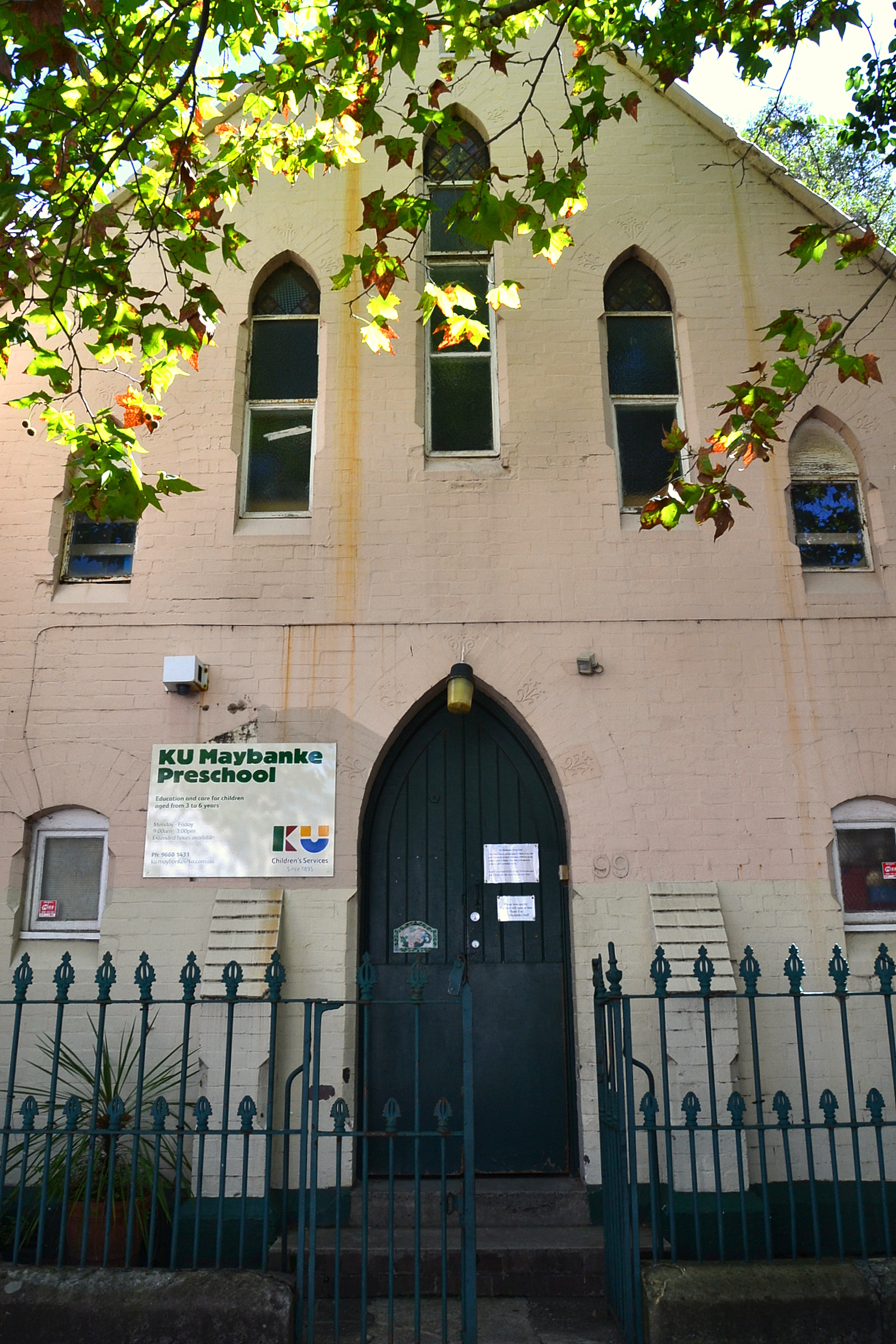
Maybanke Kindergarten, named after Maybanke Anderson, in Harris Street

The area was also the site of the first Presbyterian Church in the colony, built in 1864 and situated in Mount Street. The congregation eventually outgrew the premises and had to move to a new church at Quarry Street, Ultimo, in 1883. In the 1870s, a small Methodist chapel was built in Harris Street on land owned by Charles Saunders. In the 1920s, it was converted to the Maybanke Free Kindergarten, named after Maybanke Anderson, a feminist and educationist. It was still used for that purpose as of 2018.

Pyrmont became a working class industrial and port community. A major sugar refinery was operated by CSR Limited. In 1900 the area had a population of around 30,000. The first Pyrmont Bridge opened in 1858. A larger bridge with a swinging span opened in 1902, but was closed to traffic in the 1980s. It was subsequently turned into a pedestrian precinct. In 1973, a public meeting held between residents of Pyrmont and Ultimo asked the Builders Labourers Federation imposed a green ban on the North Western Expressway to save much of the suburb.

=== Decay ===
Pyrmont was regarded as a slum area in the late 19th century. It started to decay seriously after World War II, when industries closed down, and the residents moved to the suburbs. In 1963, the Ultimo Powerhouse closed down as well. Its population declined to only 1,800 by 1978.

By 1990, the population had dropped to around 900.

=== Redevelopment in the 1990s ===
In order to rejuvenate the area the government initiated the Better Cities Program. In 1992, the City West Development Corporation had been created with the mission to renew the precinct. In 1999, this responsibility has been transferred to the Sydney Harbour Foreshore Authority.

This led to a larger community of 13,000 by 2004 and also an increase of trade with businesses moving back into the area, totalling 22,000 employees. Almost all industrial function is gone from the area now, replaced by low and high-rise residential developments. The sugar refinery closed down and some of the buildings, including The Cooperage and Tablet House, were restored as residential and office space. Both are listed on the local government heritage register.

Following the redevelopment the suburb became more multicultural, with only 35% of residents born in Australia, followed by 8% born in China.

== Landmarks ==
Pyrmont Fire Station in Pyrmont Street is designed by the Government Architect, Walter Liberty Vernon, in 1907. It is an example of the Federation Free Style, predominantly made of brick with sandstone trimmings, and with Art Nouveau elements. It is now on the (now defunct) Register of the National Estate.

The public school in John Street was designed by W.E.Kemp and built in 1891; a brick building, it features a bell tower, belfry and slate roof, and is on the defunct Register of the National Estate. As of 2015, the building is used by a childcare and the Pyrmont Community Center.

Union Square is a major heritage precinct. It includes the Post Office in Harris Street, The Harlequin Inn pub, two bank buildings in Union Street, the homes from 4-20 Union Street, all buildings from 99 to 125 Harris Street, the terrace from 135 to 141 Harris Street and terraces from 1-21 Paternoster Row. All of these buildings are listed on the defunct Register of the National Estate. Also on the defunct Register is the Waite and Bull building at 137 Pyrmont Bridge Road.

== Heritage listings ==
Pyrmont has a number of heritage-listed sites, including:

- 148 Harris Street: Pyrmont Post Office
- Bank Street, Victoria Road: Glebe Island Bridge
- 1, 3, 5 Cross Street: Old Pyrmont Cottages
- Metropolitan goods railway: Pyrmont and Glebe Railway Tunnels
- 38-42 Pirrama Road: Royal Edward Victualling Yard

== Commercial areas ==
The Star casino dominates the Darling Harbour waterfront of Pyrmont and the Sydney Fish Market is located on Blackwattle Bay. Jacksons Landing is a residential and commercial property development located on the northern part of the peninsula.

Pyrmont is home to the headquarters of several corporations including Accenture Australia, Network 10, Google and radio stations Nova 96.9, Smooth 95.3, and 2SM. Pyrmont is the former home to Seven West Media (moved to Australian Technology Park at Eveleigh in 2017) and 2GB (moved to North Sydney in 2020).

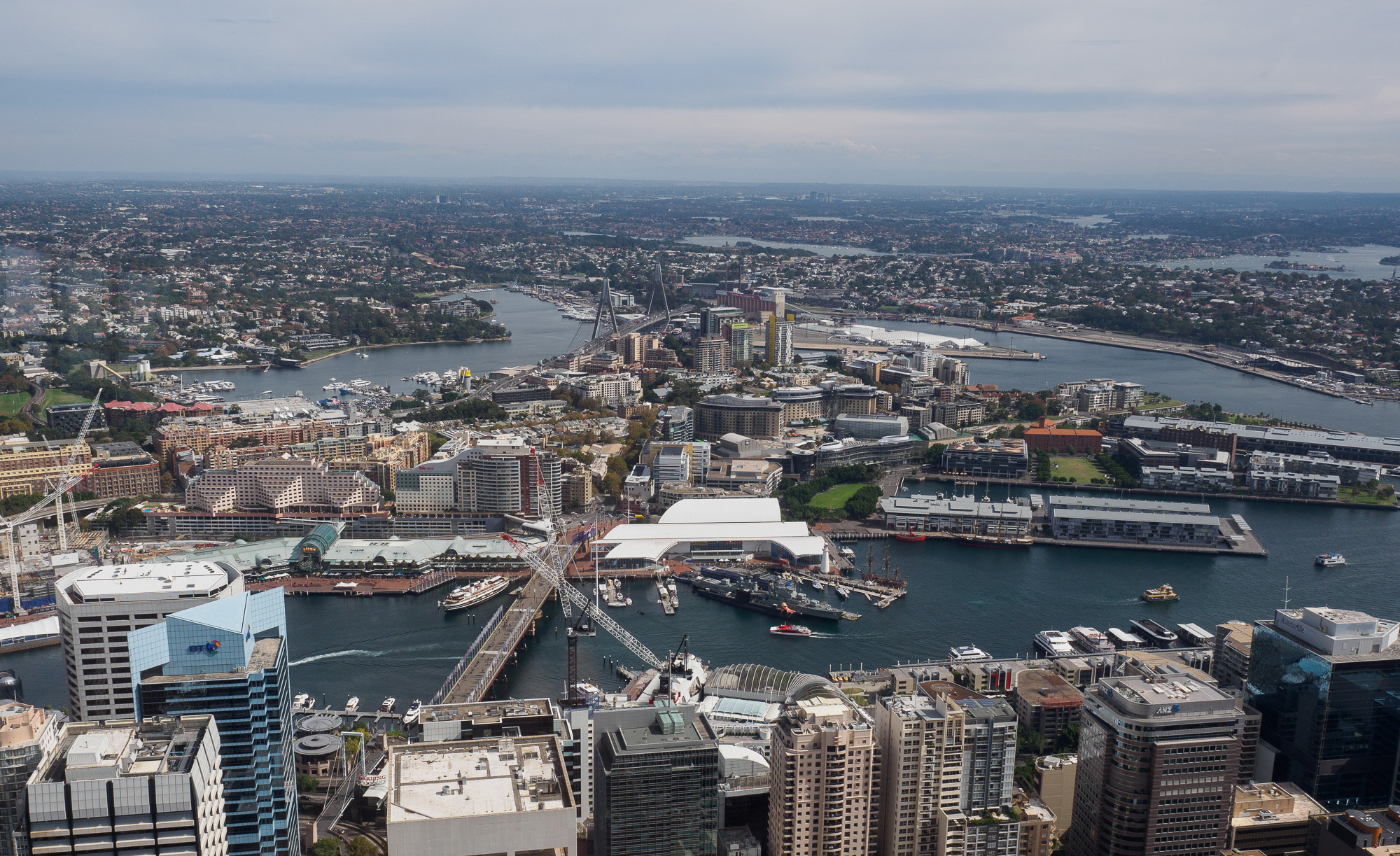
View of Pyrmont from Sydney Tower

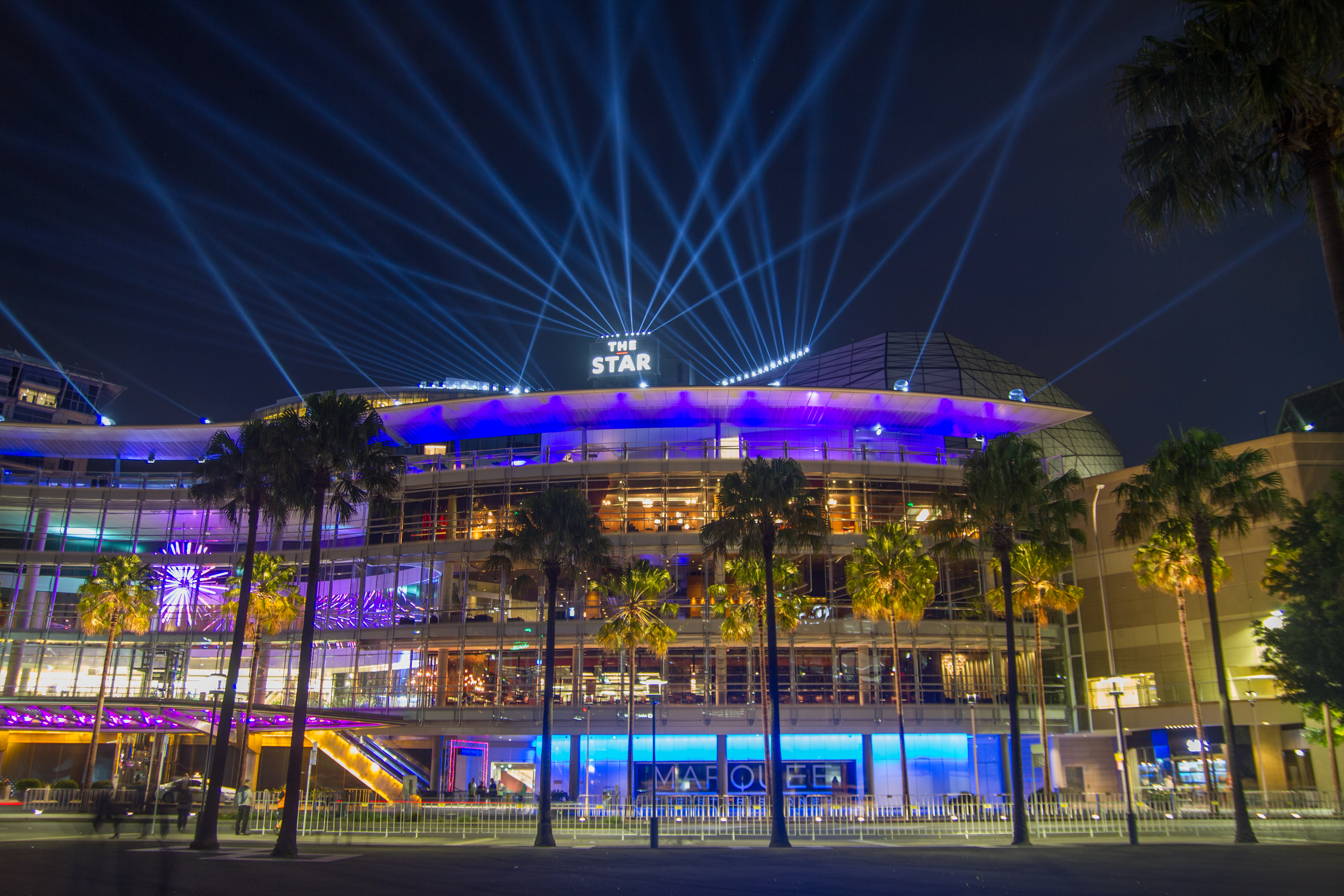
The Star during Vivid Sydney 2015
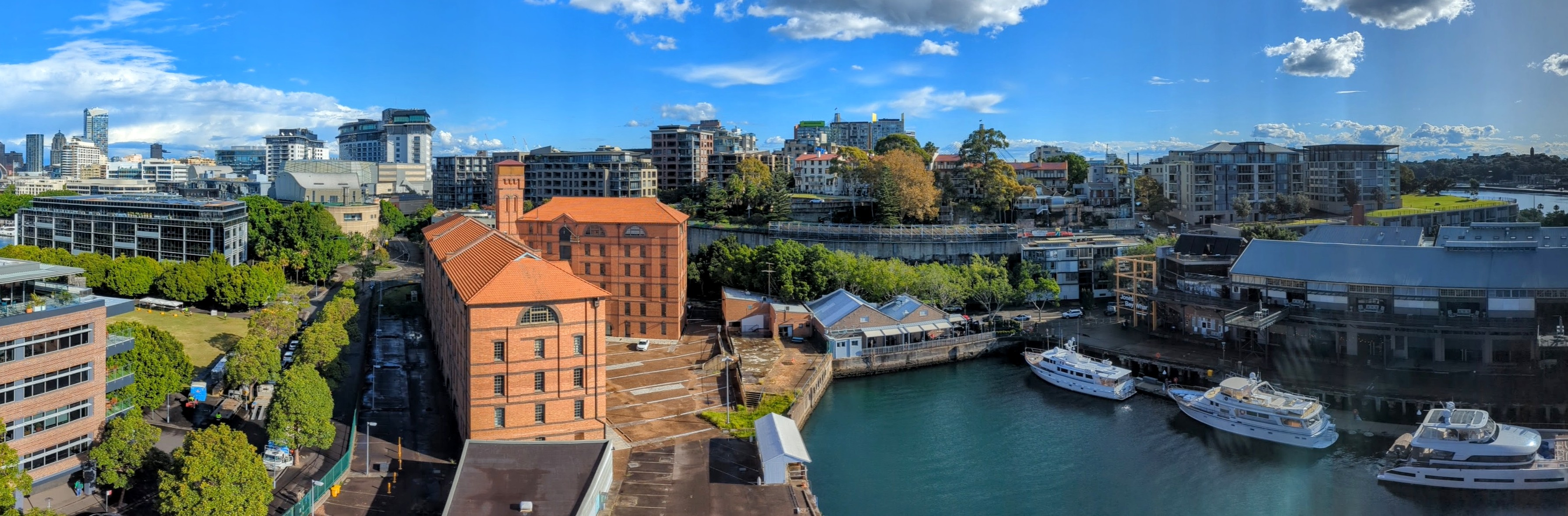
Panoramic view of Pyrmont from the REVY C rooftop on Darling Island, with Jones Bay Wharf at right

== Demographics ==
Historical population
| Year | Pop. | ±% |
|---|---|---|
| 2001 | 7,861 | — |
| 2006 | 11,088 | +41.1% |
| 2011 | 11,618 | +4.8% |
| 2016 | 12,813 | +10.3% |
| 2021 | 12,658 | −1.2% |

At the 2021 census, 12,658 people were living in Pyrmont. In the 2016 census, there were 12,813 people in Pyrmont.

In 2021, 40.7% of people were born in Australia. The other most common countries of birth were China 6.2%, England 4.2%, India 4.0%, Thailand 2.5% and New Zealand 2.2%. 52.6% of people only spoke English at home. Other languages spoken at home included Mandarin 6.9%, Cantonese 4.3%, Spanish 3.3%, Thai 2.6% and Indonesian 1.6%. The most common responses for religion were No Religion 43.6% and Catholic 18.6%. 93.7% of dwellings were flats, units or apartments and 5.7% are semi-detached terraced houses or townhouses.

== Transport ==
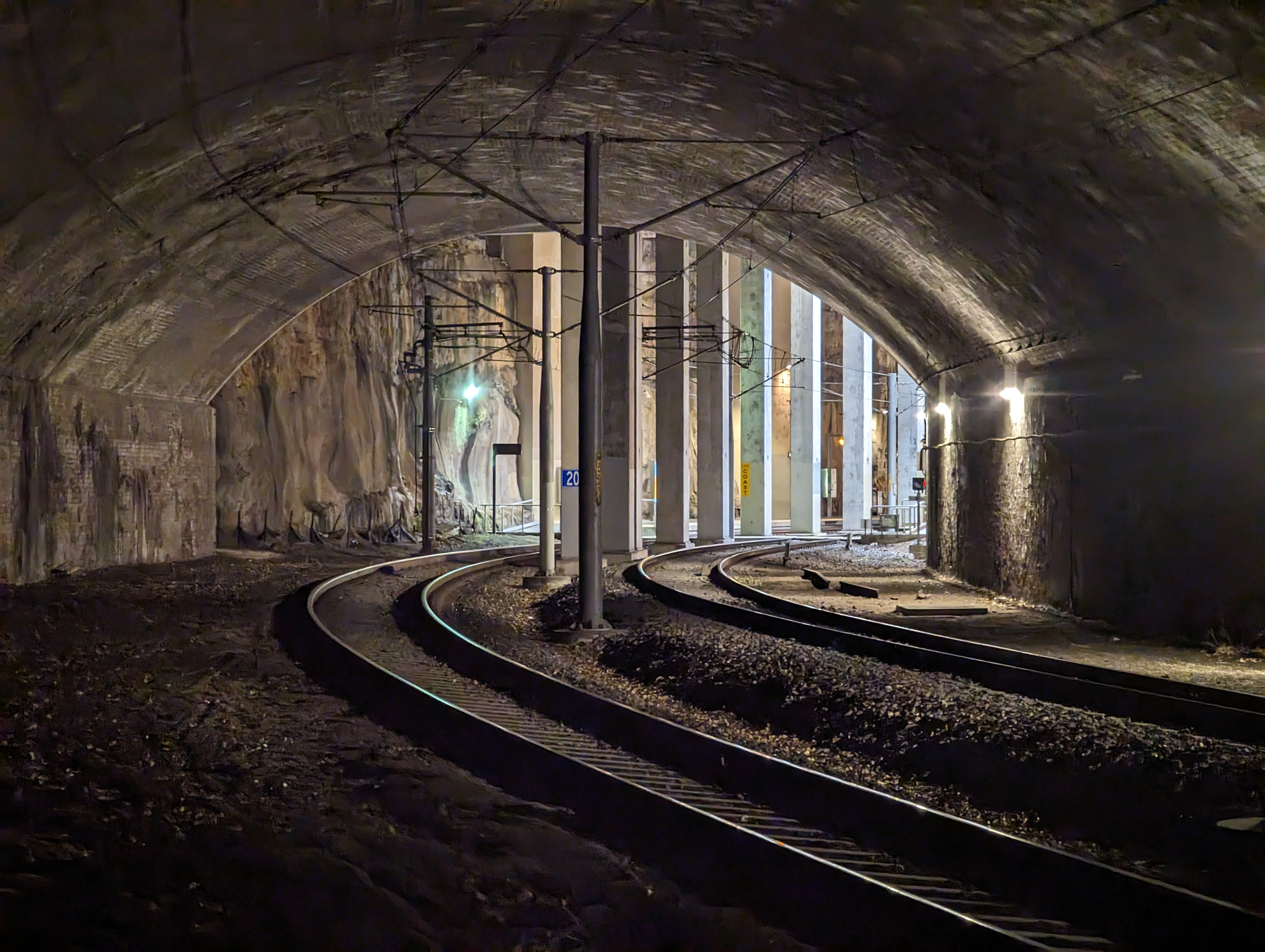
Pyrmont light rail tunnel

=== Road transport ===
Pyrmont is linked to the city by the Pyrmont Bridge, a swing bridge for pedestrians and cyclists. The Western Distributor passes through the suburb and provides a connection to the city and then to the North Shore via the Sydney Harbour Bridge. The Distributor includes the Anzac Bridge, a large cable-stayed bridge spanning Johnstons Bay between Pyrmont and Rozelle, which replaced the Glebe Island Bridge.

=== Light rail ===
The Inner West Light Rail includes five light rail stops in the suburb - Pyrmont Bay, The Star, John Street Square, Bank Street and Wentworth Park. The Pyrmont Bay ferry wharf is served by Pyrmont Bay ferry services. Pyrmont is also served by buses.

Pyrmont was served by the former Sydney tramway network. Services commenced at Railway Square, travelling southwest on Broadway, turning right onto Harris Street, passing the former Darling Harbour Goods Yard. At Pyrmont a separate line branched off from the main line on Harris Street, turning left into Miller Street, turning right into Bank Street, crossing the former Glebe Island Bridge. It then travelled along Commercial Road turning right onto Victoria Road, then right onto Darling Street, terminating at the Darling Street wharf. The tram lines closed in 1958. The Sydney Monorail ran between the city and nearby Darling Harbour across the Pyrmont Bridge between 1988 and 2013.

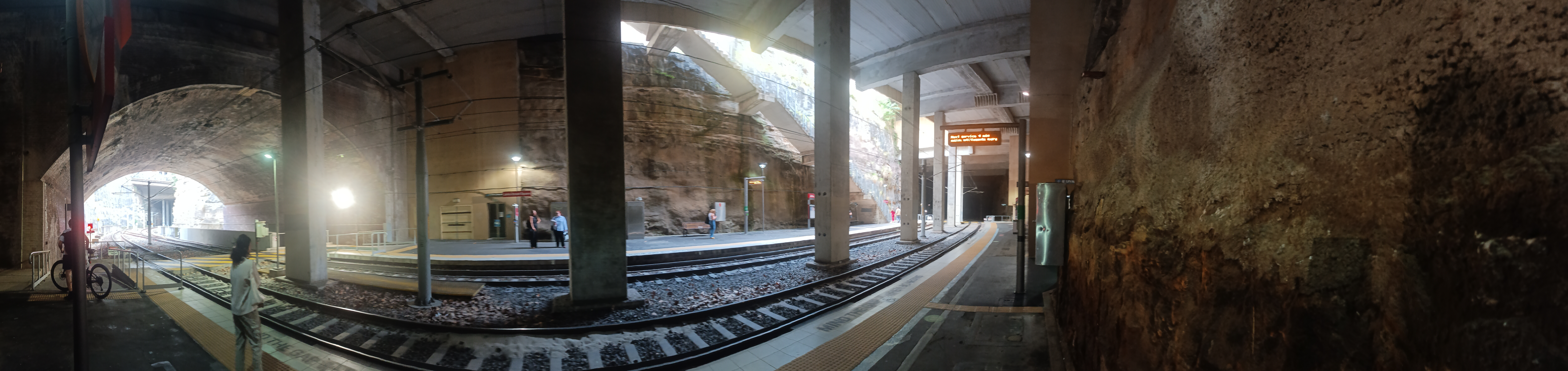
John Street Square, light rail station, Pyrmont. 2026

=== Heavy rail ===
Pyrmont is a future rapid transit station that will be built as part of the Sydney Metro West project.

== Parks ==
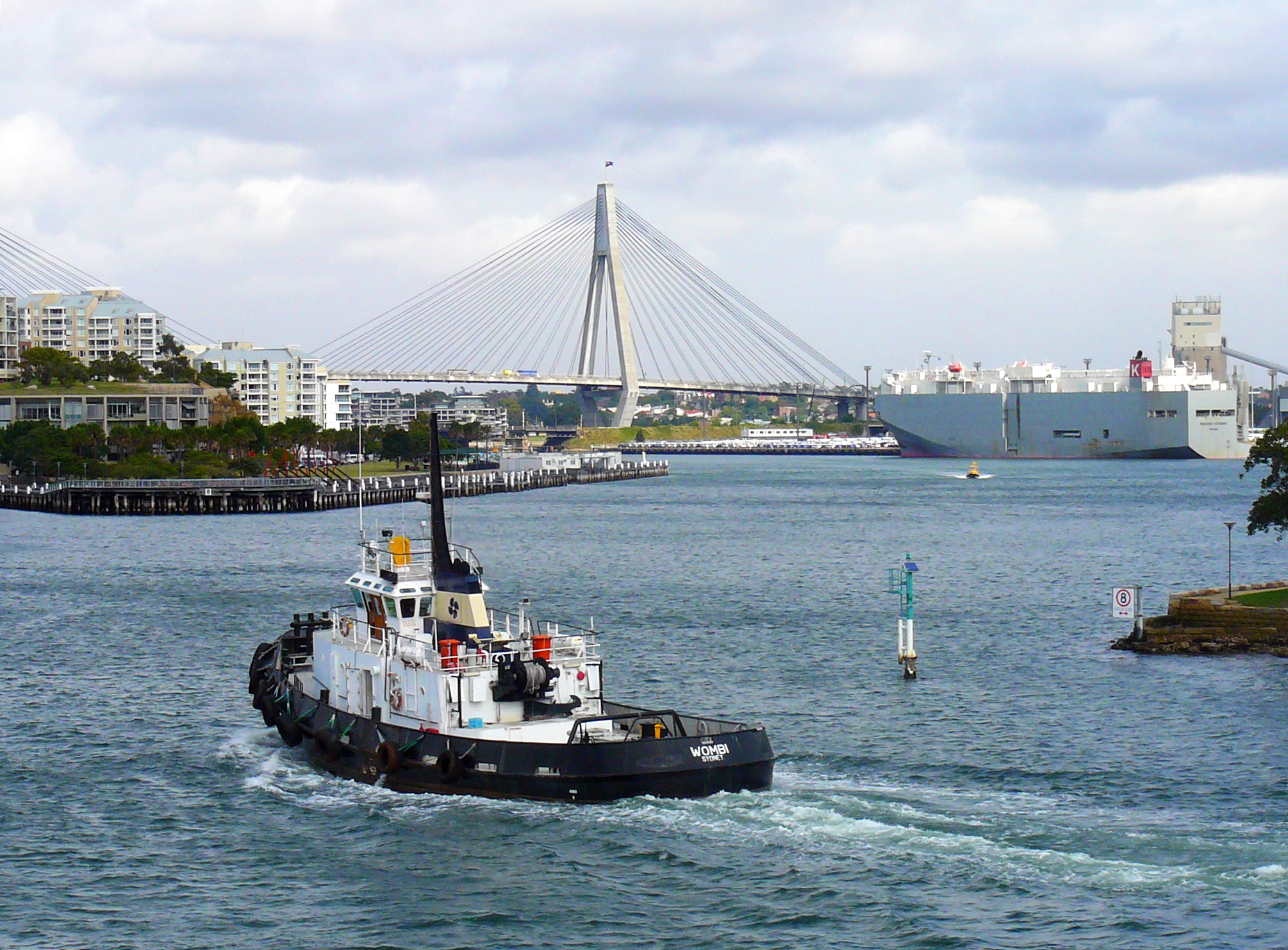
Pyrmont Point Park (left) and Anzac Bridge (background), 2009

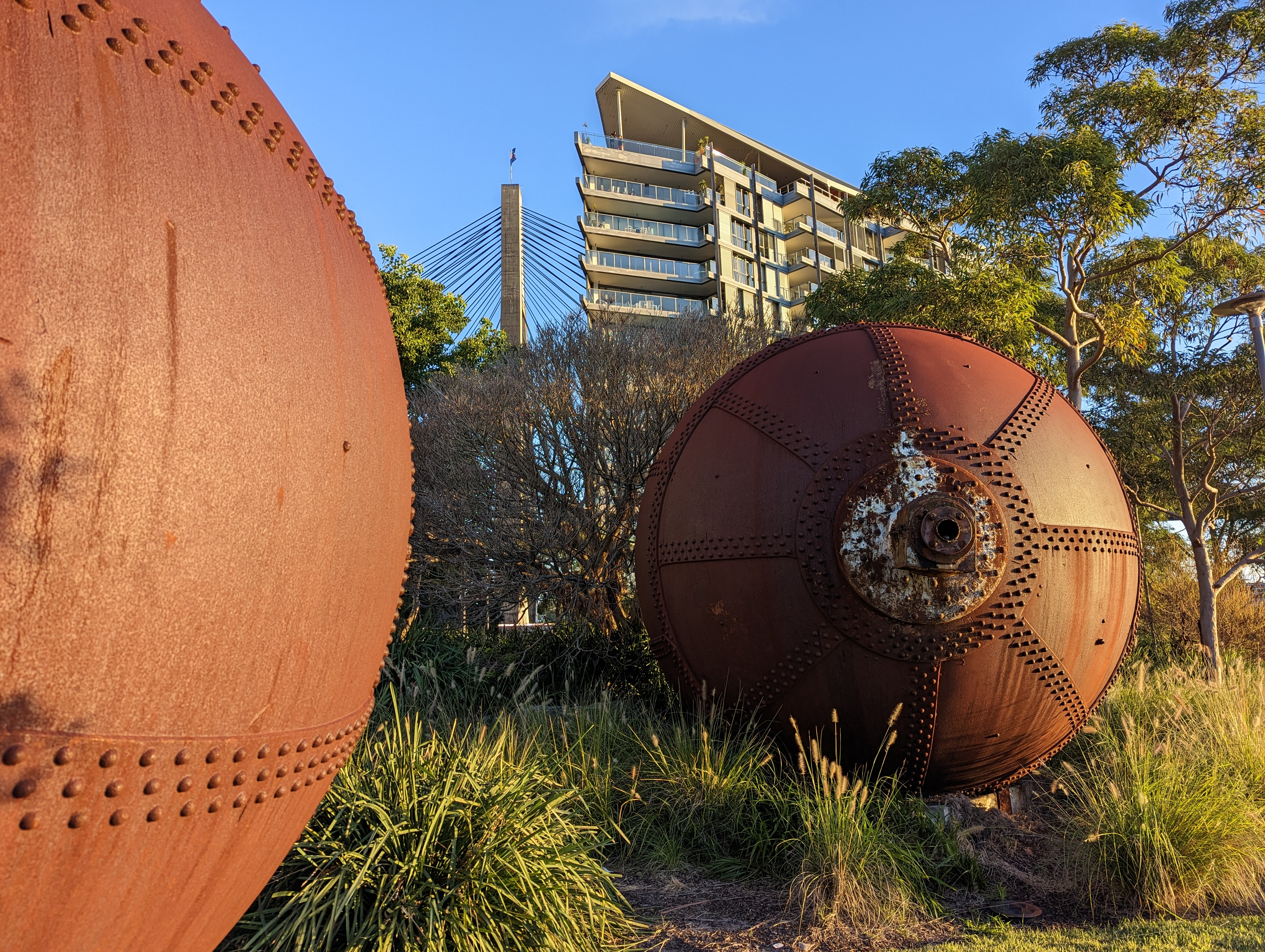
Wood chip digester balls ("Canite defibrators") at Waterfront Park

St Bartholomew's Park is a small park on the corner of Bowman Street and Cross Street, created in 1954 after the demolition of numbers 113-115 Bowman Street. The park is named after St Bartholomew's Church which once stood nearby on Point Street (now a block of apartments at 22 Point Street).

Pirrama Park (previous known as Pyrmont Point Park) is located in the northern tip of the peninsula, overlooking Balmain East, and extends southwest along the coast to Elizabeth Macarthur Bay and the beginning of Harris Street, along Pirrama Road. The land was previously a base for the Water Police; the City of Sydney acquired it in 2005 and developed the area into a 1.8ha recreational space, with cafes, barbeque facilities and children's play equipment.

Giba Park sits atop the cliff overlooking Pirrama Park.

Waterfront Park is near the western extreme of the suburb, near the Glebe Island Bridge.

Other parks in Pyrmont include The Knoll, Carmichael Park, Jones Street Pocket Park, Ballaarat Park, Metcalfe Park, Pyrmont Bay Park, Bank Street Foreshore Park, and Refinery Square.

== Gallery ==
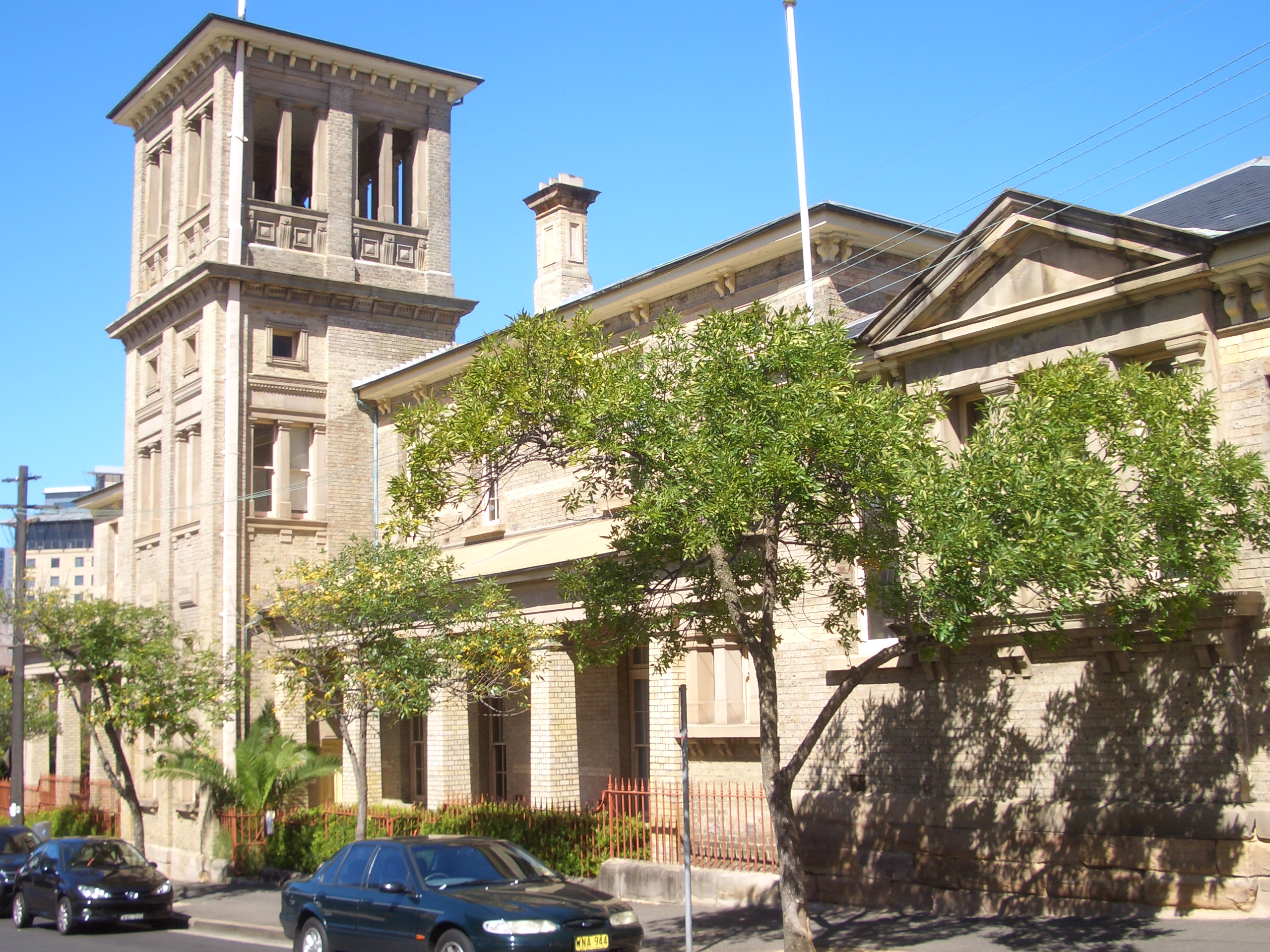
Pyrmont Public School, John Street

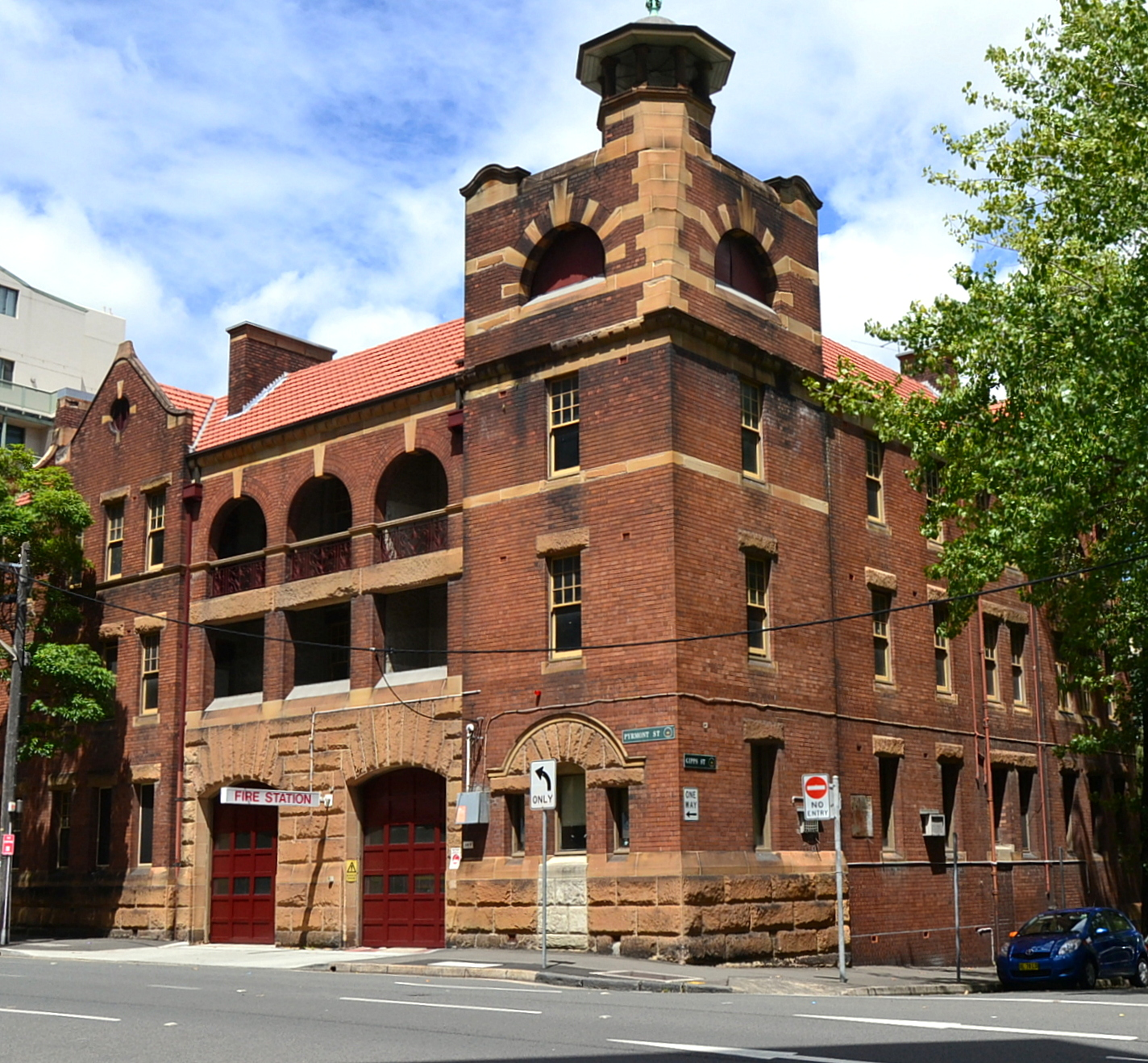
Pyrmont Fire Station, Pyrmont Street

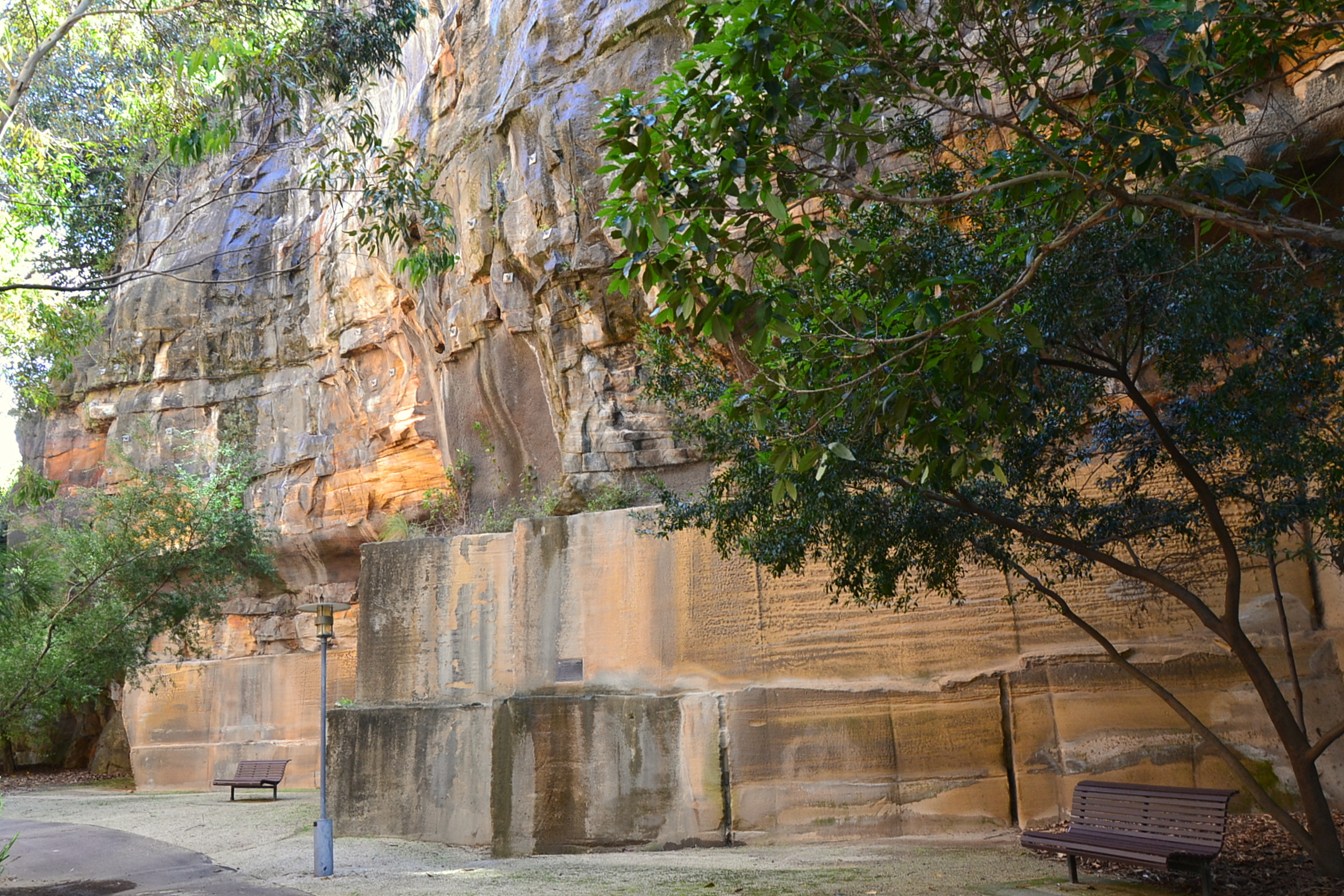
Charles Saunders's Paradise Quarry near Saunders Street

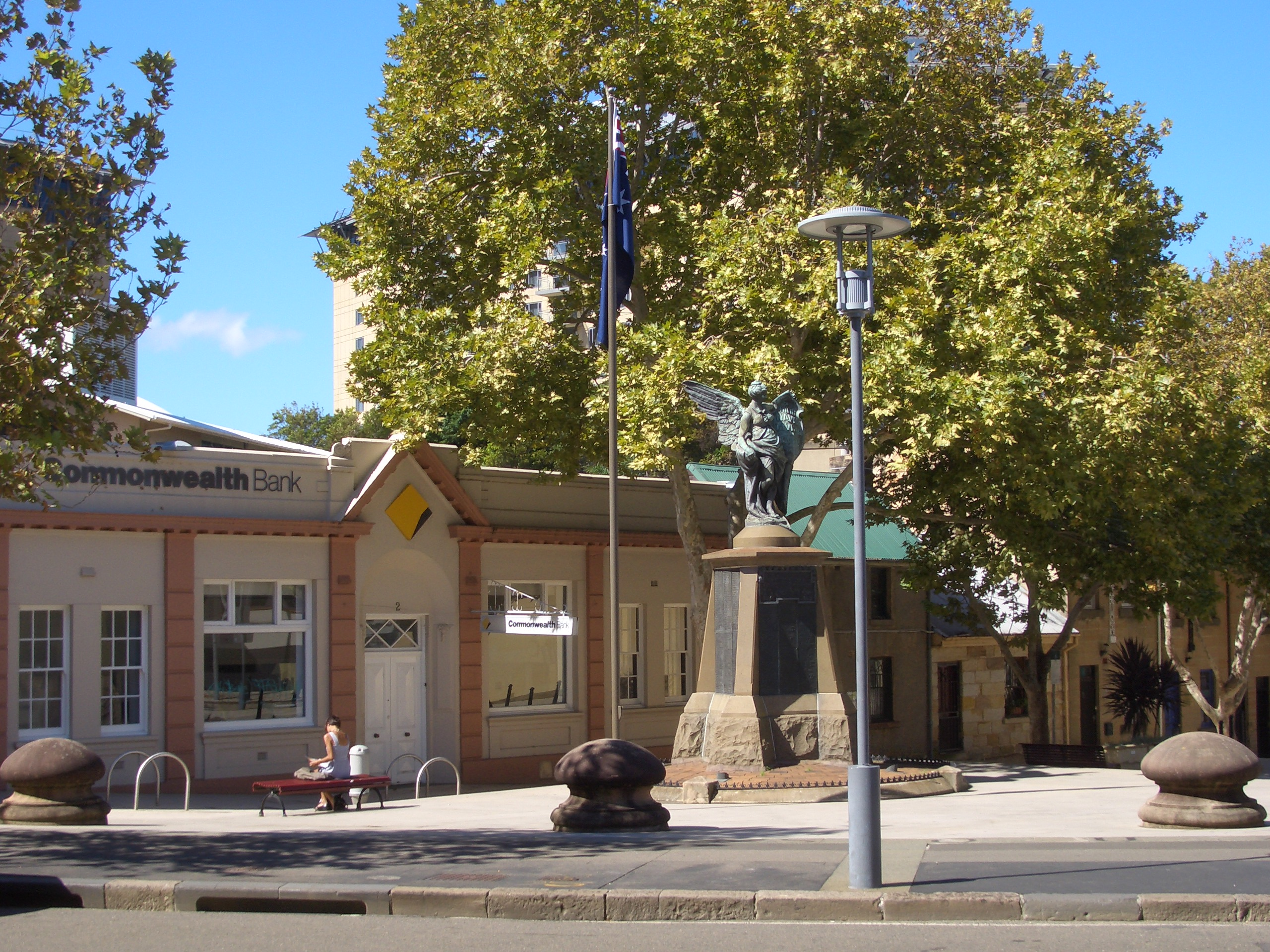
Union Square

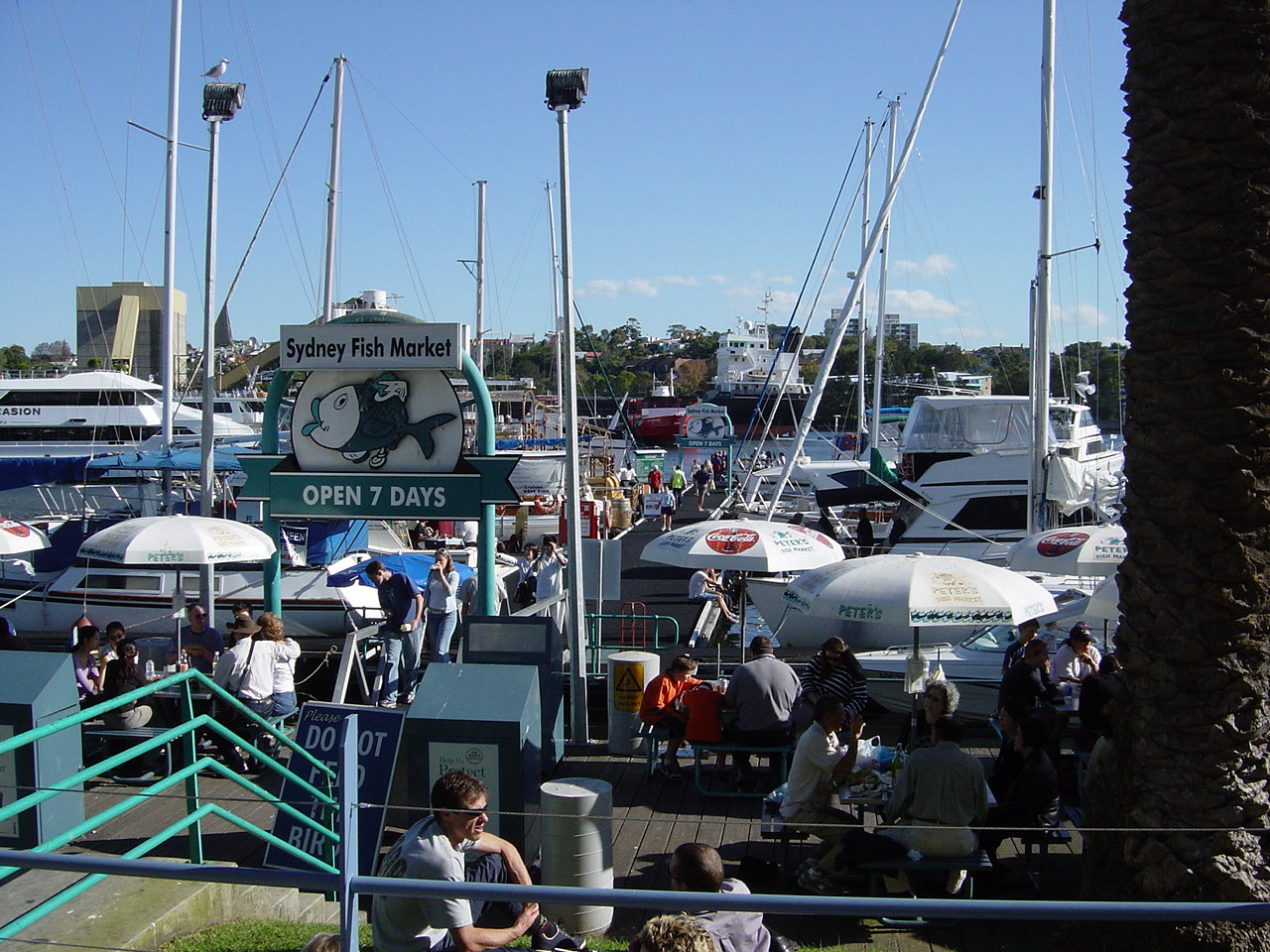
Sydney Fish Markets

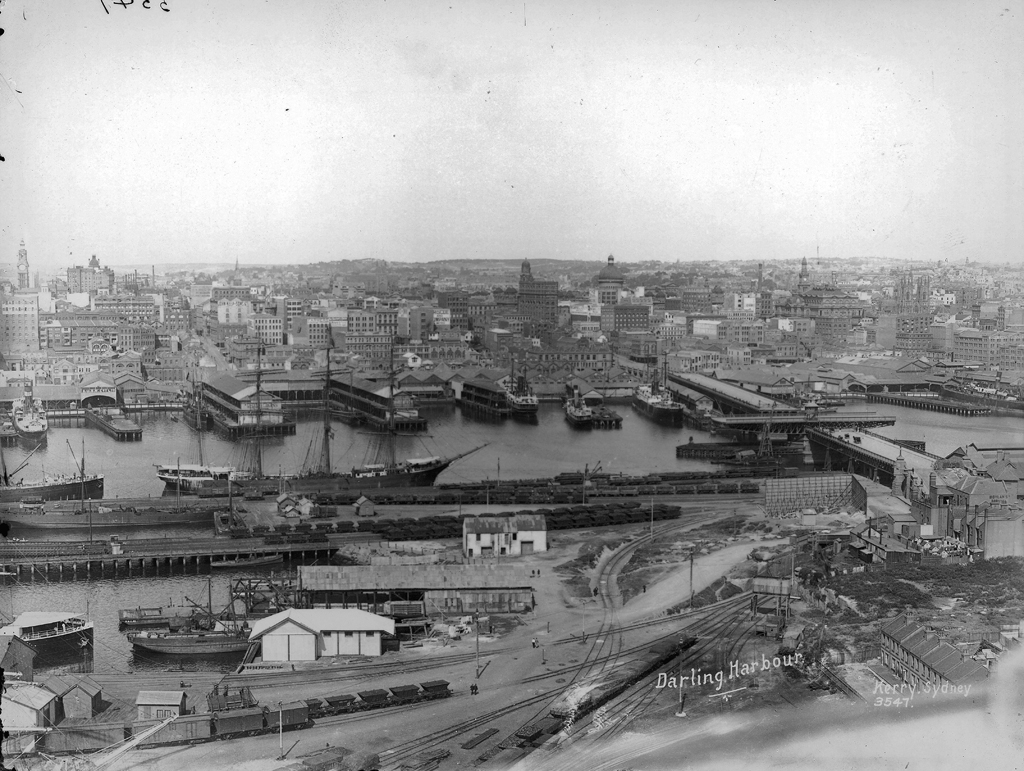
Pyrmont Bridge 1900

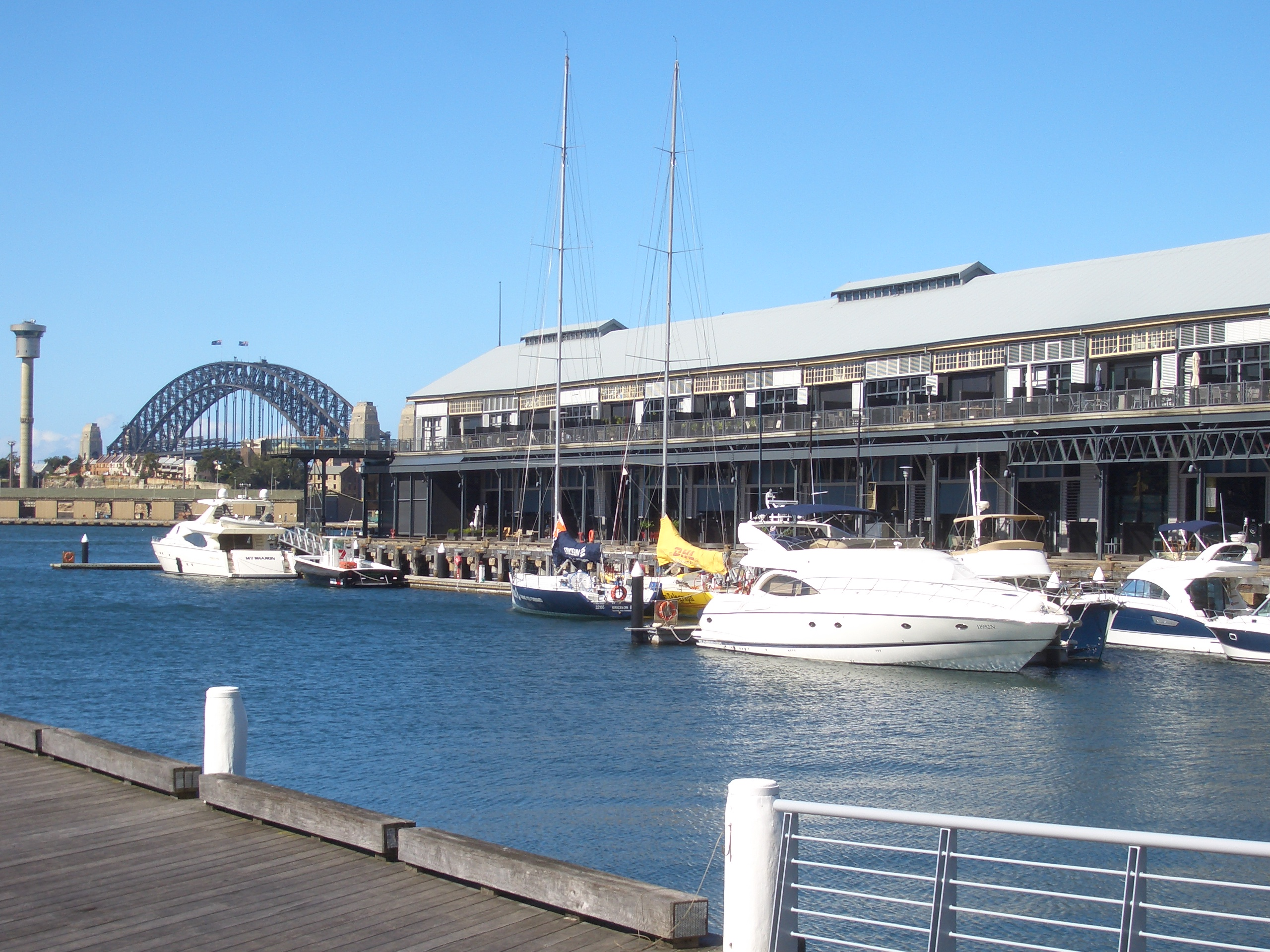
Pyrmont wharves

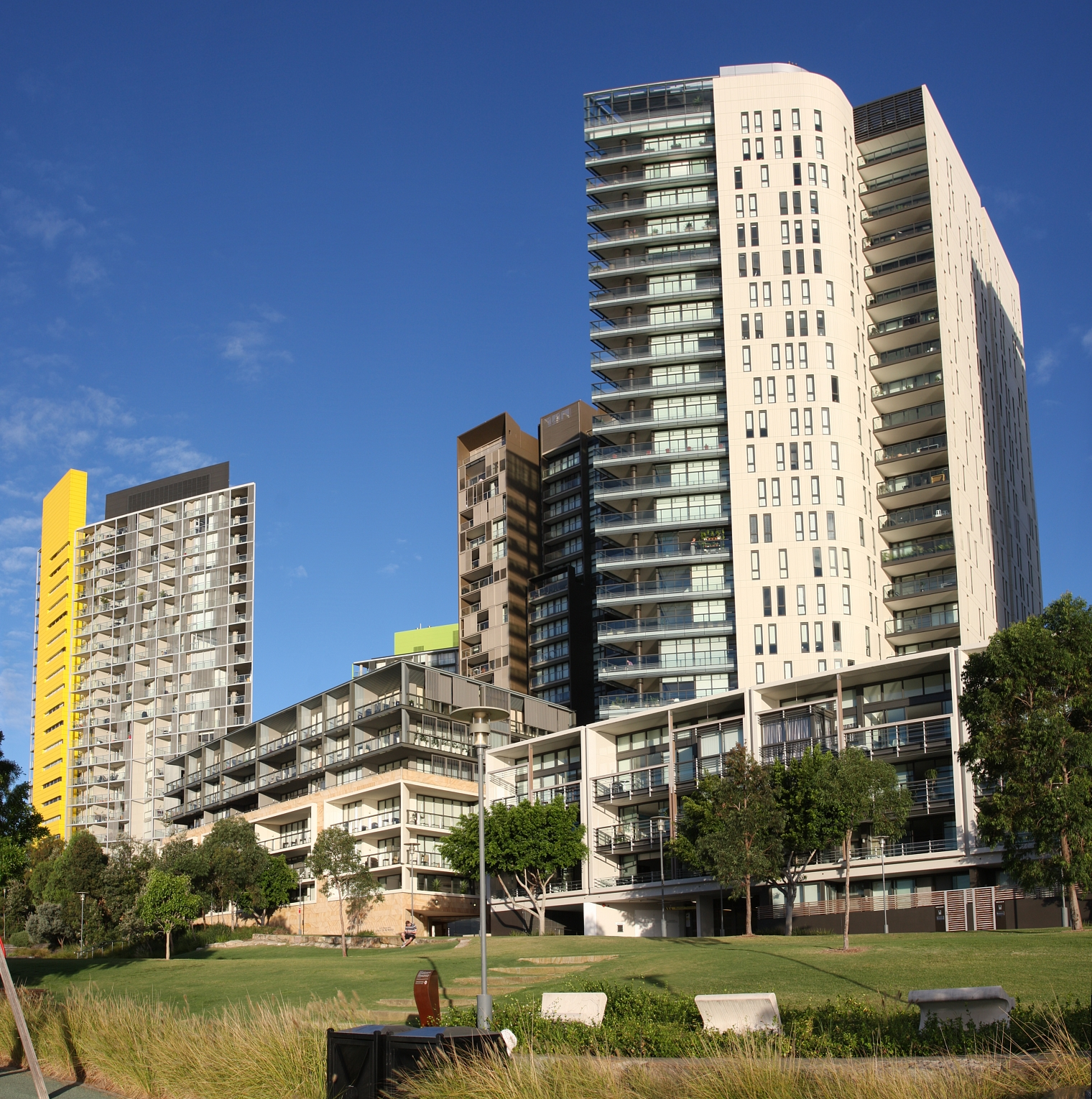
New apartments in Pyrmont

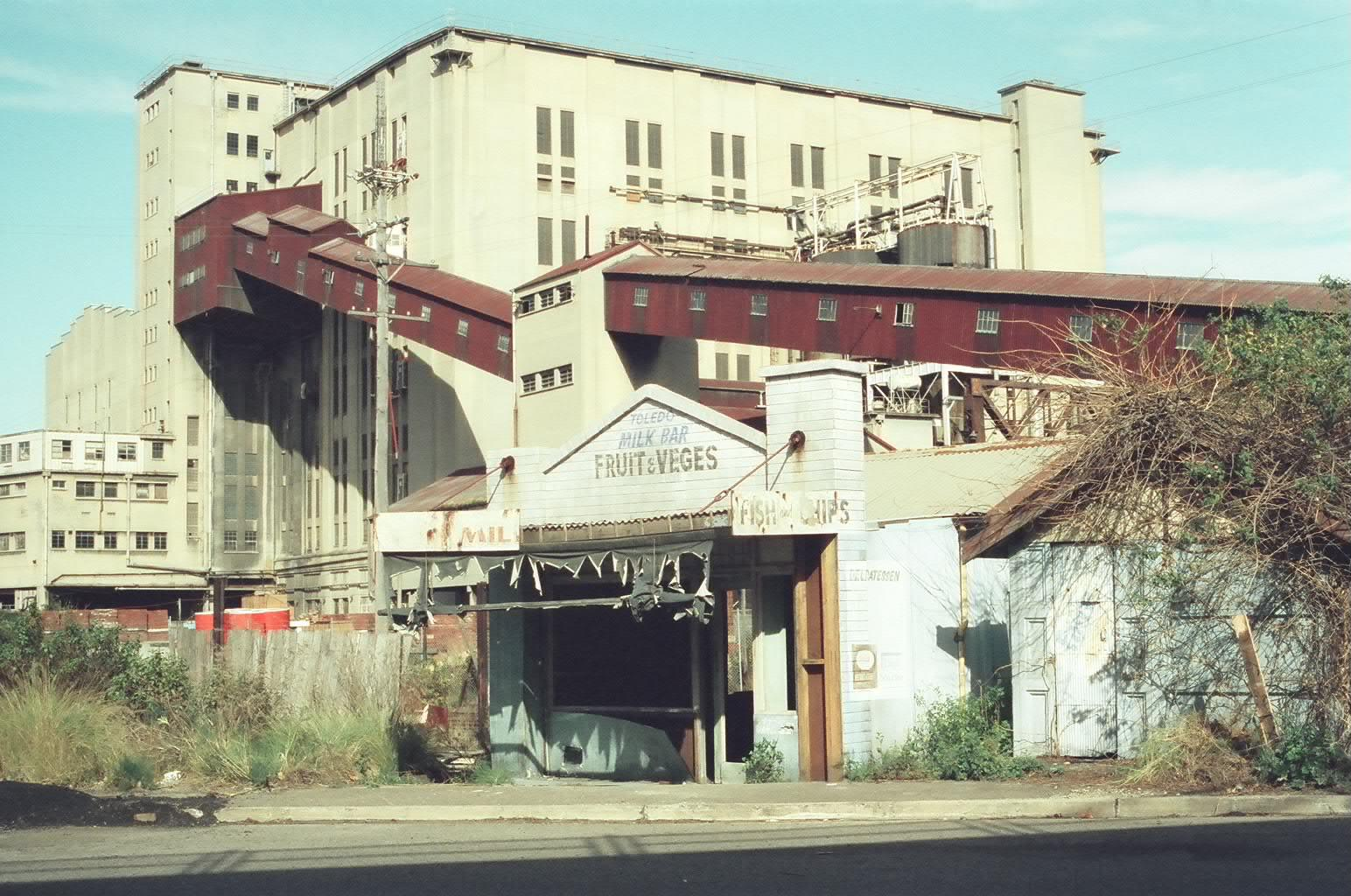
Pyrmont Power Station (chimneys removed)

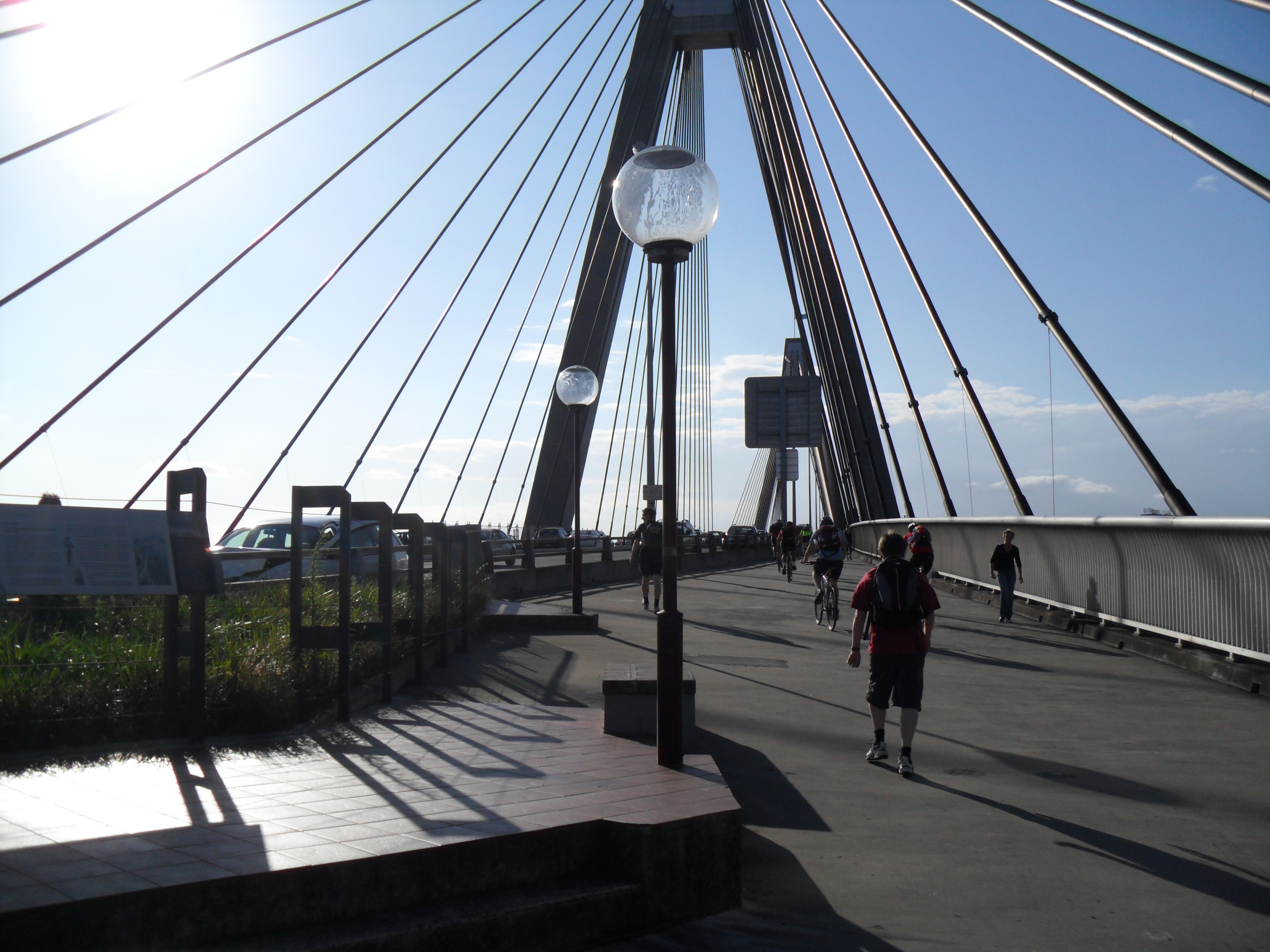
Pyrmont end of ANZAC Bridge, rest area where bicycle/pedestrian ramp joins the bridge from Quarry Master Drive (between Bank St and Saunders St).

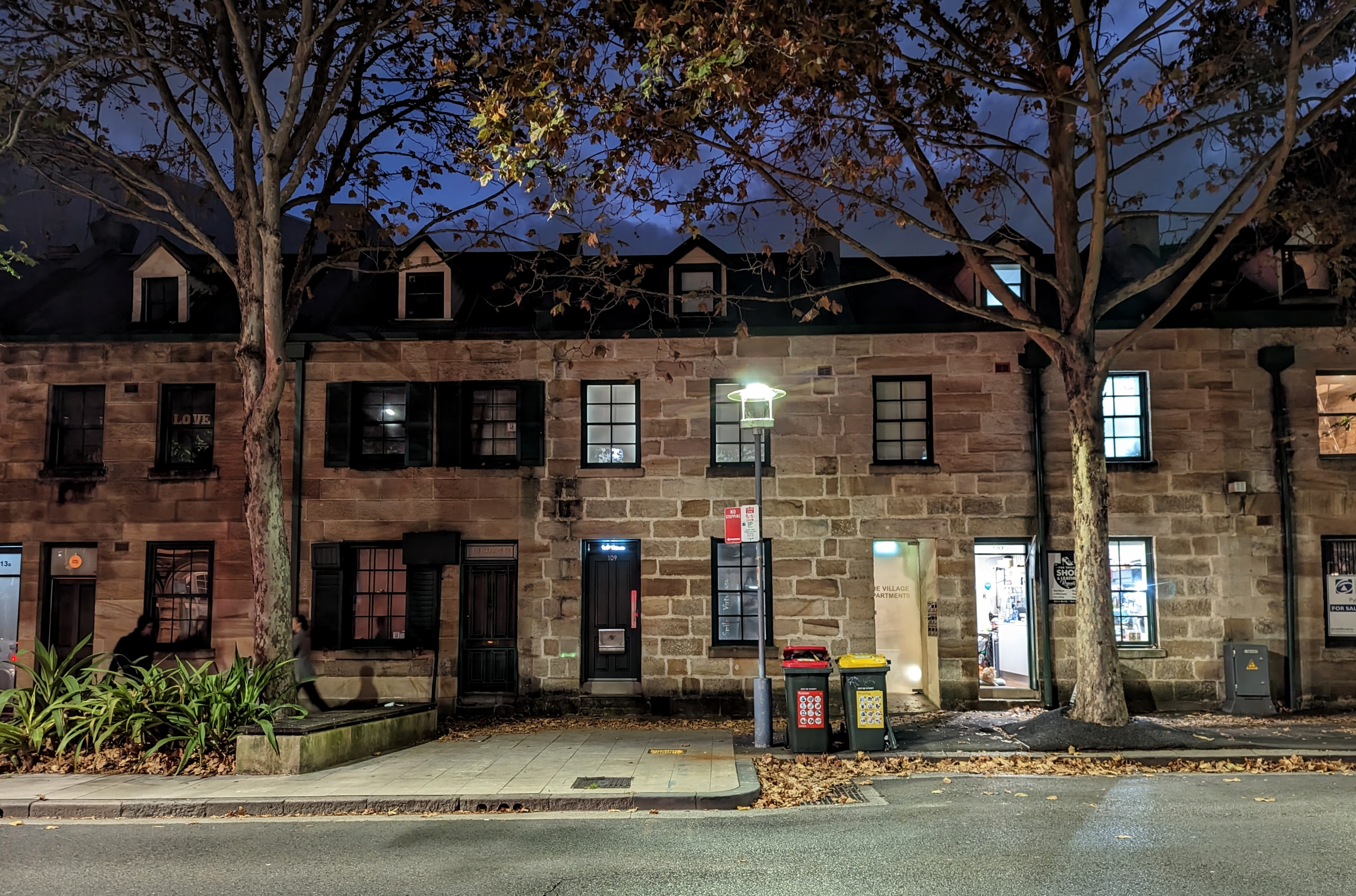
Sandstone terrace houses on Harris Street

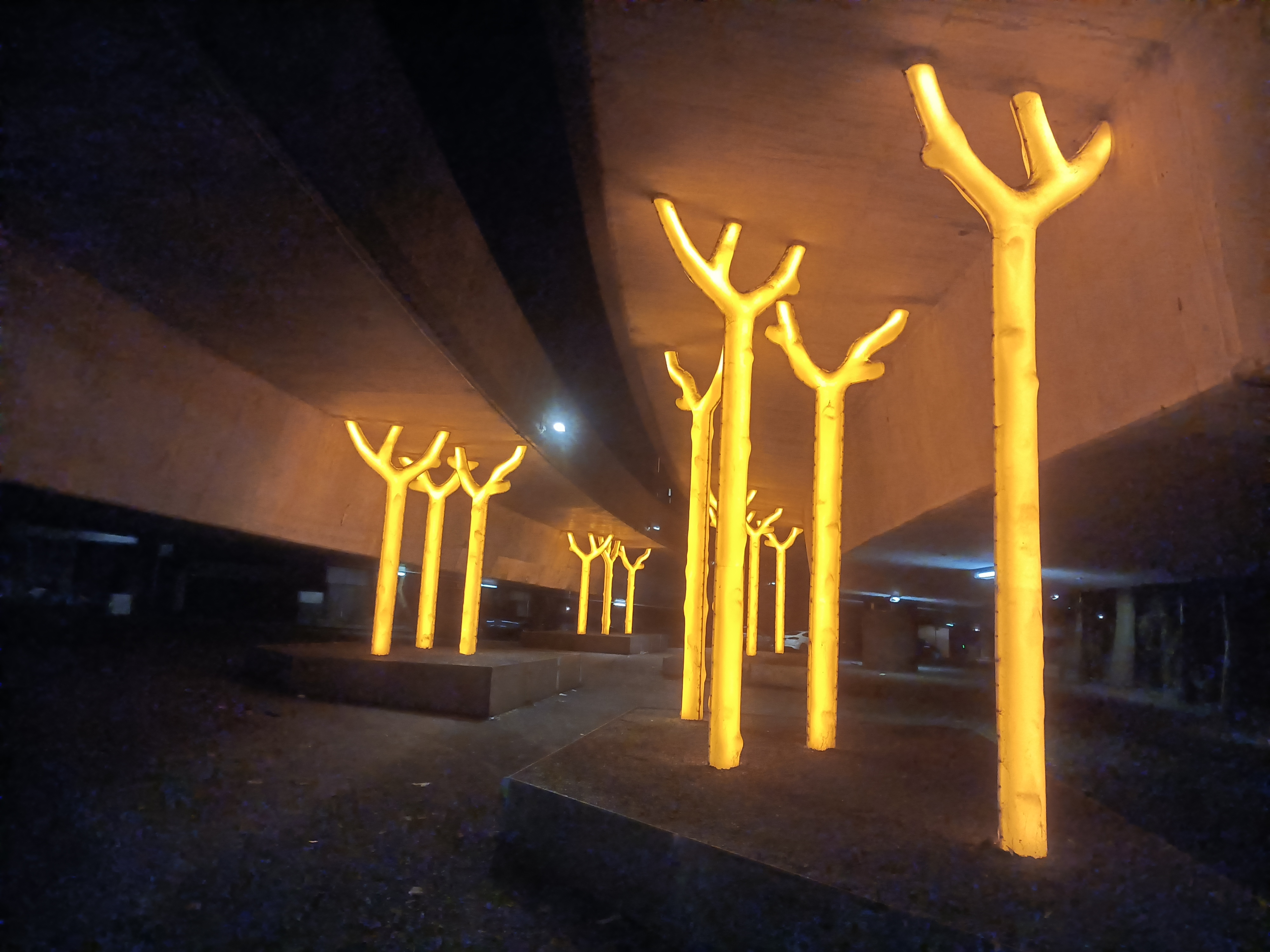
"Aspire" by Warren Langley. Illuminated high density polyethylene. Bulwara rd and Upper fig st. 2025
