= Jones Bay Wharf =

Wharf in Pyrmont, Sydney, Australia

Coordinates: 33°51′48″S 151°11′42″E

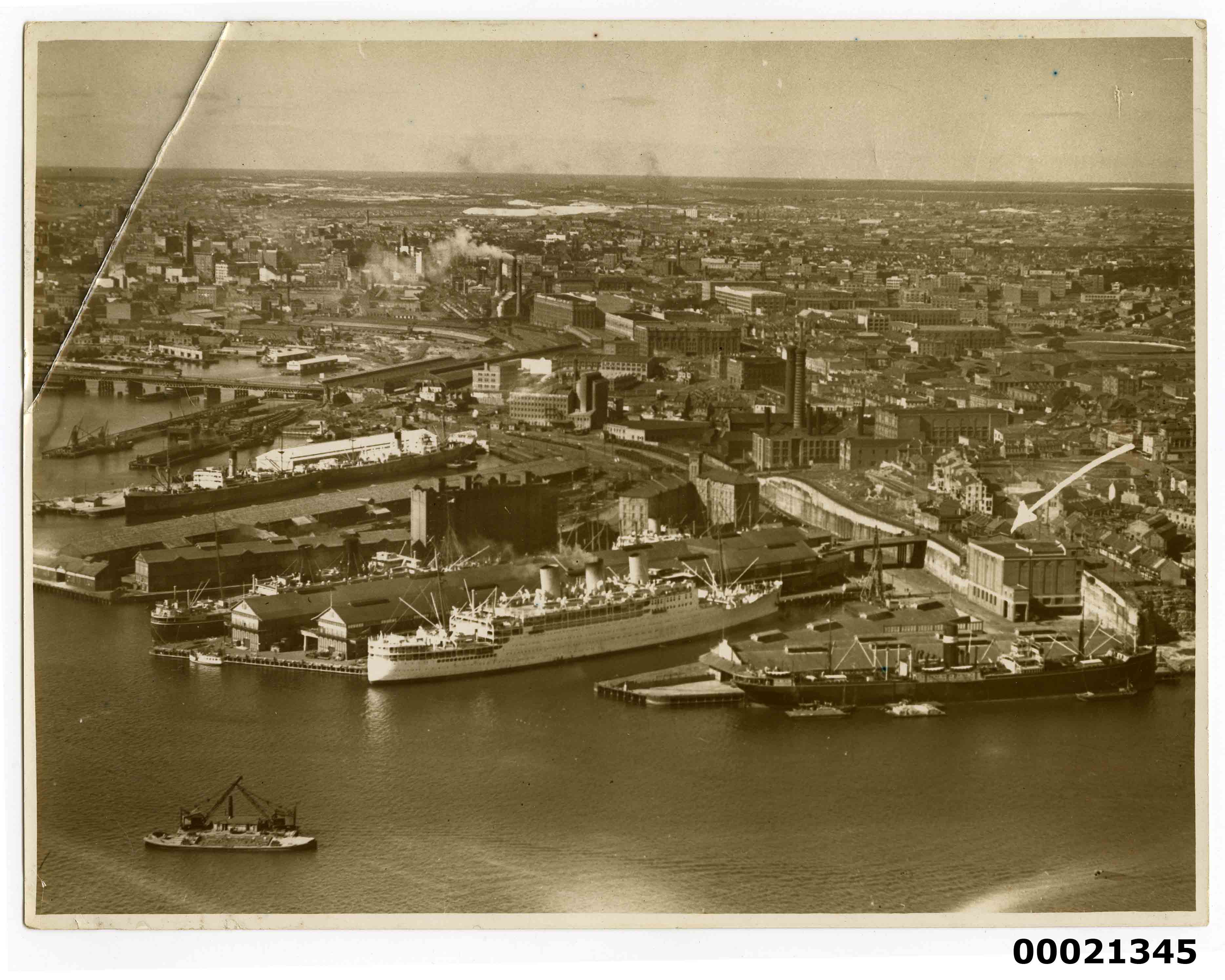
RMS Strathnaver at Jones Bay Wharf, circa 1940s, the period when the ship was used as a troop ship

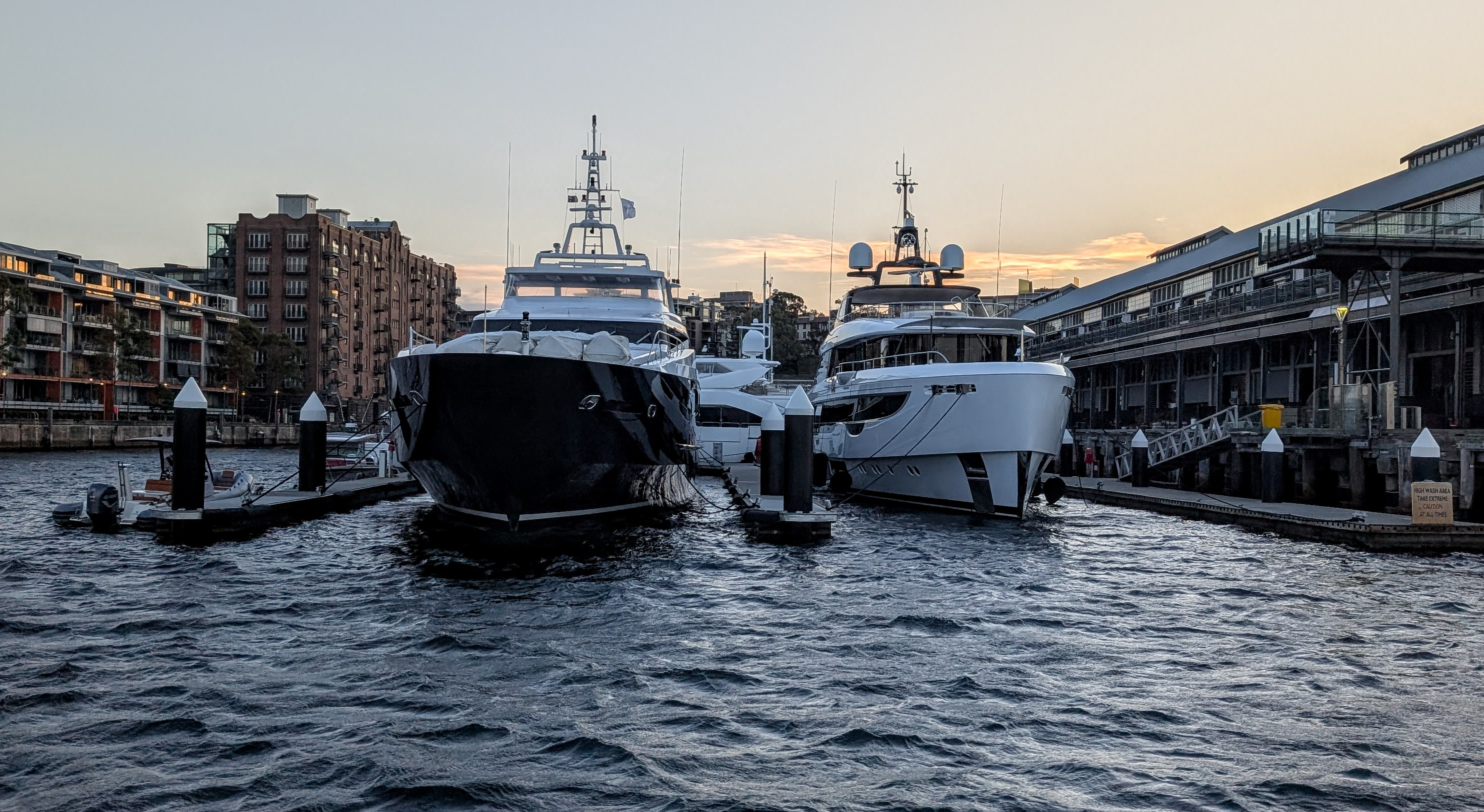
Yachts at Jones Bay Wharf

Jones Bay Wharf (also known as Jones Bay Finger Wharf or the Port of Sydney's Berths 19–21) is a historically important wharf on Jones Bay, a small bay at Pyrmont, Sydney, Australia. The wharf was completed in 1919, and in the 21st century has been converted to modern business spaces.

In the early 20th century Jones Bay Wharf served both freight and passenger liners. It was an important point of embarkation for troops during World War II, and a major point of arrival for immigrants after the war.

The wharf is home to the Jones Bay Marina, a facility for superyachts in and visiting Sydney.

== History ==
A proposal from the Australasian Steam Navigation Company for the construction of a wharf at Jones Bay was published in the Government Gazette of the State of New South Wales in 1854, but the wharf was not built until much later; it does not appear on the City of Sydney 1903 map.

The Sydney Harbour Trust took over responsibility for waterfront planning and built out the Jones Bay Wharf area in 1911–1919.

== See also ==
- Finger Wharf – another major finger wharf in Sydney
- King Street Wharf – a nearby marginal wharf in Darling Harbour
