= History of Sydney =

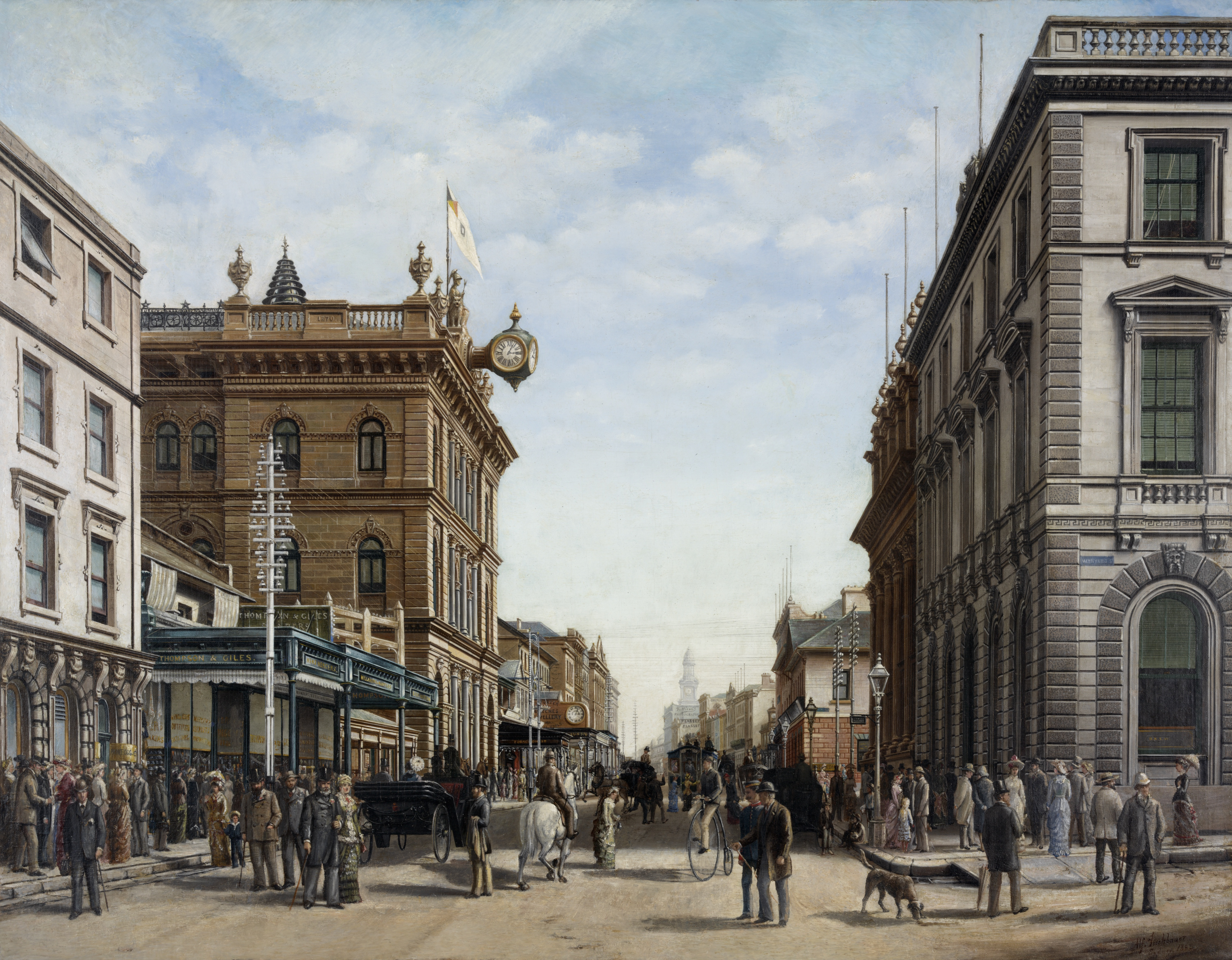
George Street, Sydney by Alfred Tischbauer, 1883

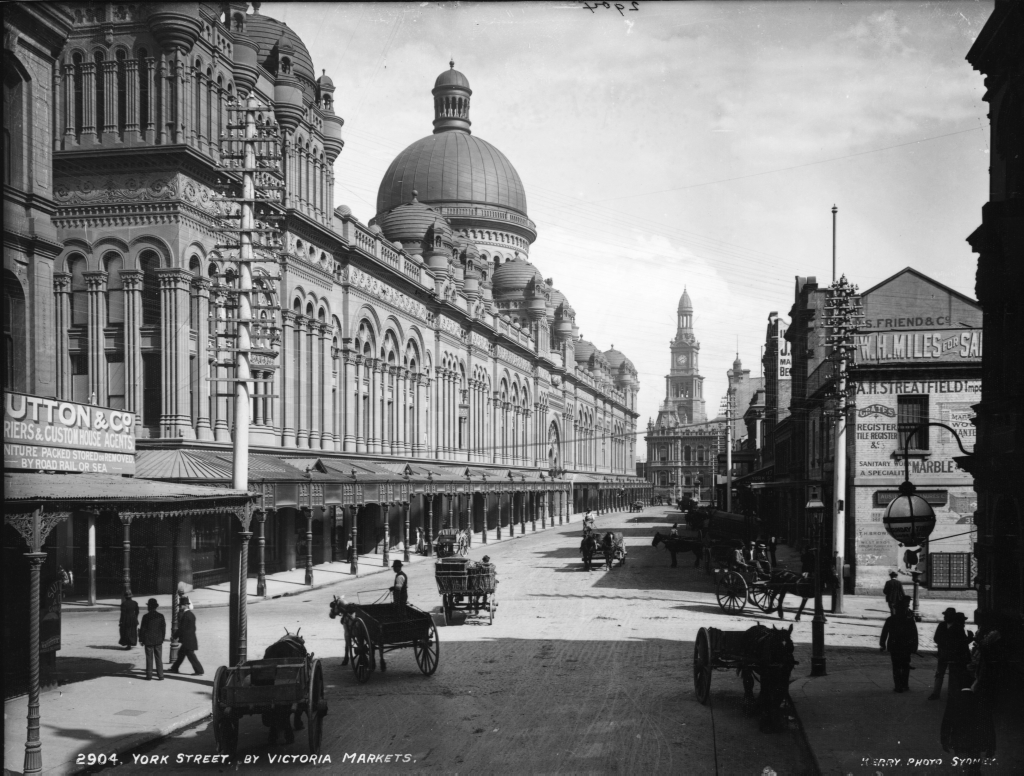
The Queen Victoria Building on York Street, looking toward the Sydney Town Hall, c. 1900

The history of Sydney is the story of the peoples of the land that has become modern Sydney.

Aboriginal Australians have inhabited the Sydney region for at least 30,000 years, and Aboriginal engravings and cultural sites are common in the Sydney area. The traditional owners of the land on which modern Sydney stands are the Darug, Dharawal and Eora people. The history of the city began with the arrival of a First Fleet of British ships in 1788 and the foundation of a penal colony by Great Britain.

From 1788 to 1900 Sydney was the capital of the British colony of New South Wales. The town of Sydney was declared a city in 1842, and a local government was established. In 1901, the Australian colonies federated to become the Commonwealth of Australia, and Sydney became the capital of the state of New South Wales. Sydney today is Australia's largest city and a major international centre of culture and finance. The city has played host to numerous international events, including the 2000 Summer Olympics.

== Prehistory ==
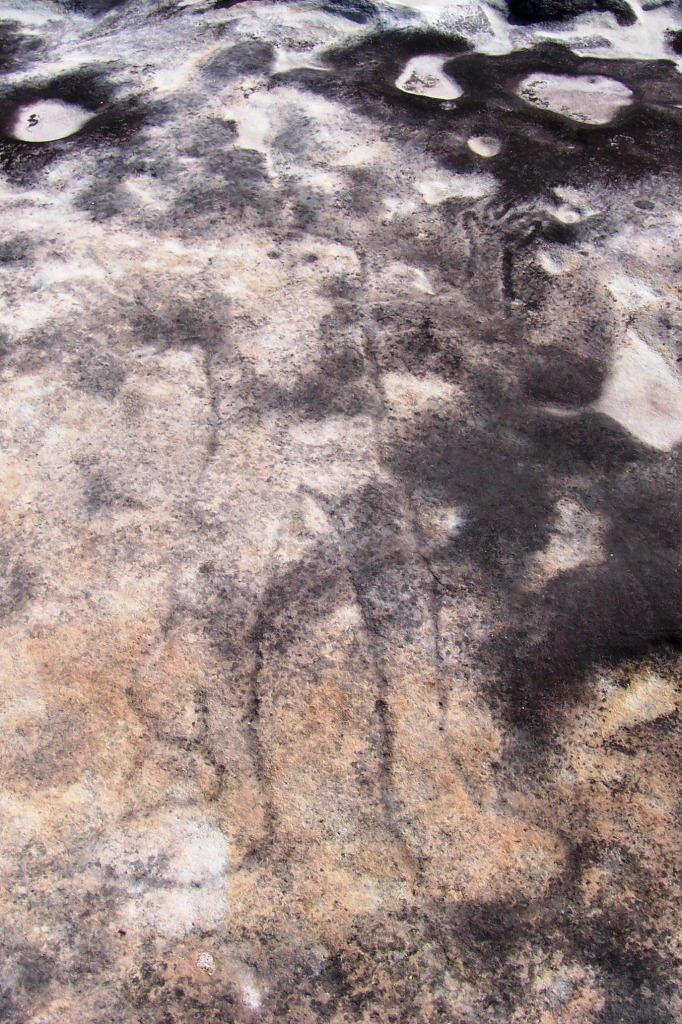
Petroglyph in Sydney's Ku-ring-gai Chase National Park

The first people to inhabit the area now known as Sydney were Aboriginal Australians who had migrated from northern Australia and before that from southeast Asia. Flaked pebbles found in Western Sydney's gravel sediments might indicate human occupation from 45,000 to 50,000 years BP, while radiocarbon dating has shown evidence of human activity in the Sydney region from around 15,000 years ago. Prior to the arrival of the British, there were 4,000 to 8,000 Aboriginal people in the greater Sydney region. fishing, hunting, gathering plant foods and shellfish. The diet of the coastal clans was more reliant on seafoods whereas the food of hinterland clans was more focused on forest animals and plants. The clans had distinctive sets of equipment and weapons mostly made of stone, wood, plant materials, bone and shell. They also differed in their body decorations, hairstyles, songs and dances. Aboriginal clans had a rich ceremonial life which was part of a belief system centring on ancestral, totemic and supernatural beings. People from different clans and language groups came together to participate in initiation and other ceremonies. These occasions fostered trade, marriages and clan alliances.

The earliest British settlers recorded the word 'Eora' as an Aboriginal term meaning either 'people' or 'from this place'. The clans of the Sydney area occupied land with traditional boundaries. There is debate, however, about which group or nation these clans belonged to, and the extent of differences in language, dialect and initiation rites. The major groups were the coastal Eora people, the Dharug (Darug) occupying the inland area from Parramatta to the Blue Mountains, and the Dharawal people south of Botany Bay. The Darginung and Gundungurra languages were spoken on the fringes of the Sydney area.

Aboriginal clans of Sydney area, as recorded by early British settlers (Note: British settlers each used different spellings for Indigenous words. The clan names in this list use Troy's (2019) orthography. The names and territory boundaries do not always correspond with those used by contemporary Aboriginal groups of the greater Sydney area.)
Clan	Territory name	Location
Bediagal	Not recorded	Probably north-west of Parramatta
Birrabirragal	Birrabirra	Lower Sydney Harbour around Sow and Pigs reef
Boolbainora	Boolbainmatta	Parramatta area
Borogegal	Booragy	Probably Bradleys Head and surrounding area
Boromedegal	Not recorded	Parramatta
Buruberongal	Not recorded	North-west of Parramatta
Darramurragal	Not recorded	Turramarra area
Gadigal	Cadi (Gadi)	South side of Port Jackson, from South Head to Darling Harbour
Gahbrogal	Not recorded	Liverpool and Cabramatta area
Gamaragal	Cammeray	North shore of Port Jackson
Gameygal	Kamay	Botany Bay
Gannemegal	Warmul	Parramatta area
Garigal	Not recorded	Broken Bay area
Gayamaygal	Kayeemy	Manly Cove
Gweagal	Gwea	Southern shore of Botany Bay
Wallumedegal	Wallumede	North shore of Port Jackson, opposite Sydney Cove
Wangal	Wann	South side of Port Jackson, from Darling Harbour to Rose Hill

Clans known to be of the Sydney region but whose territory wasn't reliably recorded are the Domaragal, Doogagal, Gannalgal, Gomerigal, Gooneeowlgal, Goorunggurregal, Gorualgal, Murrooredial, Noronggerragal, Oryangsoora and Wandeandegal.

== Settlement ==
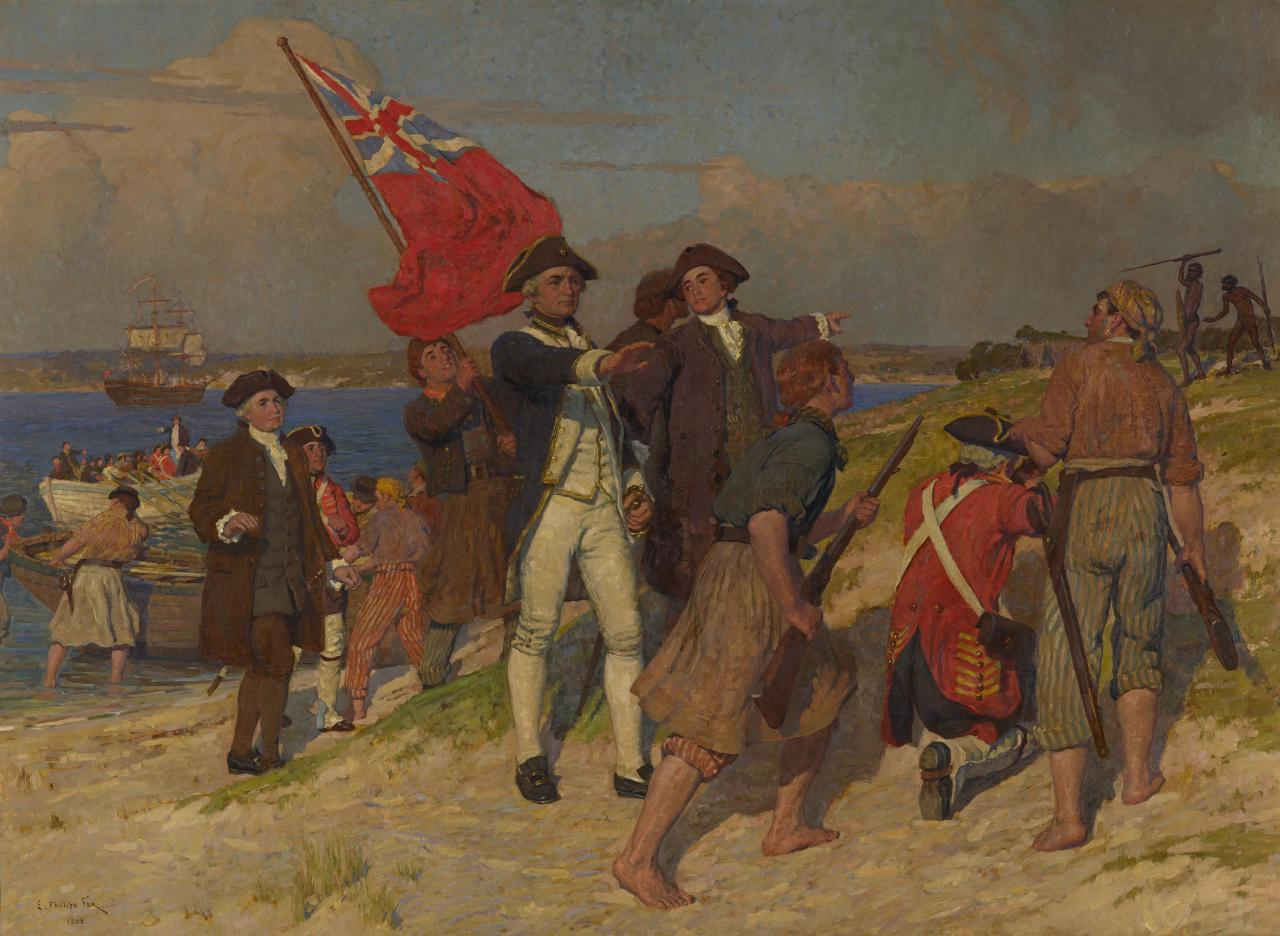
Landing of Captain Cook at Botany Bay, 1770, by E. Phillips Fox

The first meeting between Aboriginal people and British explorers occurred on 29 April 1770 when Lieutenant James Cook landed at Botany Bay (Kamay) and encountered the Gweagal clan. Two Gweagal men opposed the landing party and in the confrontation one of them was shot and wounded. Cook and his crew stayed at Botany Bay for a week, collecting water, timber, fodder and botanical specimens and exploring the surrounding area. Cook sought to establish relations with the Aboriginal population without success.

Britain had transported convicts to its American colonies for much of the eighteenth century, but the American Revolutionary War and subsequent loss of the colonies in 1783 forced the British government to seek alternative destinations. Several locations were considered, including sites in Africa that were investigated but ultimately deemed unsuitable. The loss of the American colonies was an impetus for the decision to establish a penal colony at Botany Bay, while proponents of colonisation also pointed to the strategic importance of a new base in the Asia-Pacific region and its potential to provide much-needed timber and flax for the navy.

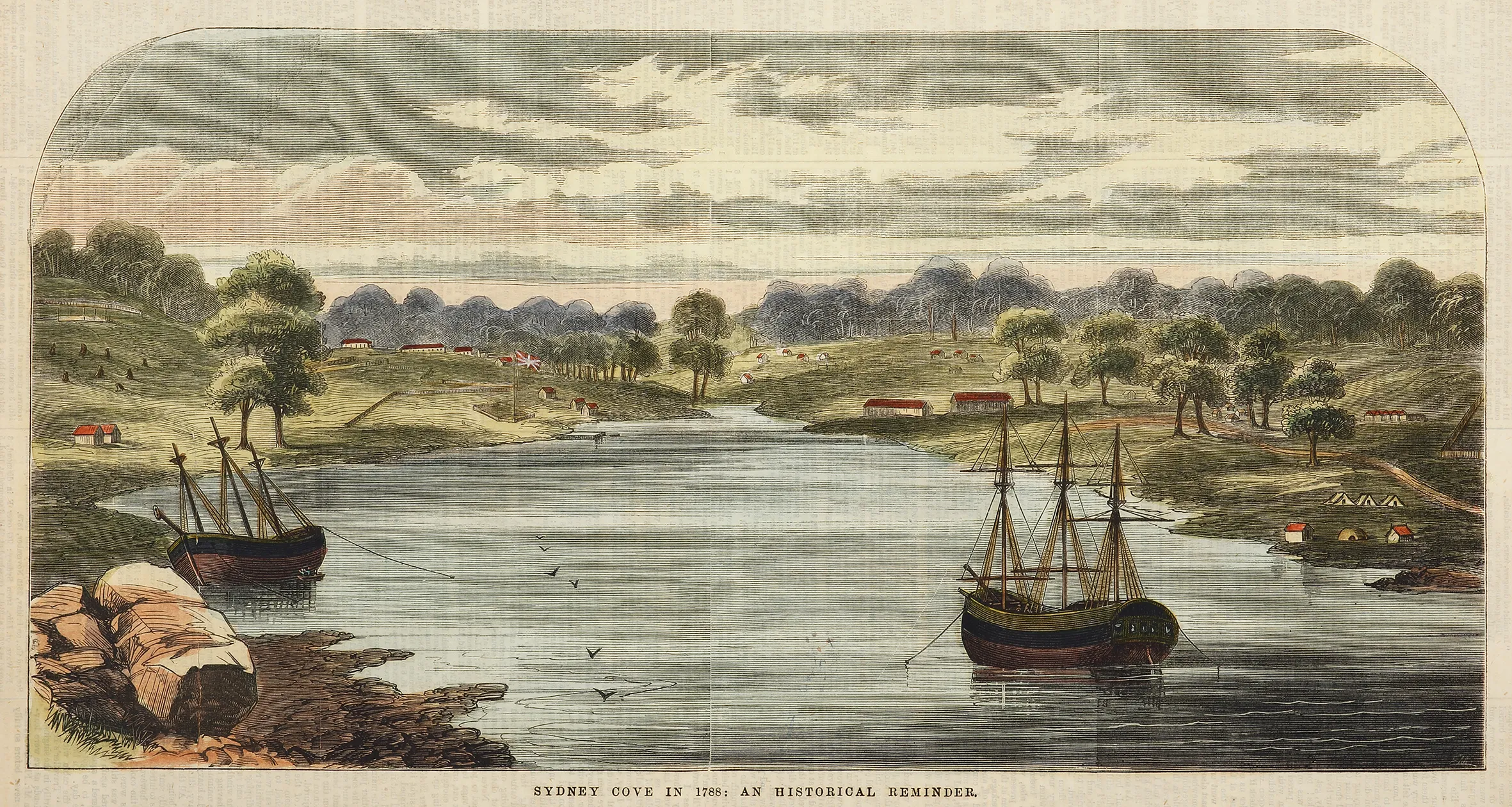
Sydney Cove upon settlement in 1788

The First Fleet of 11 ships under the command of Captain Arthur Phillip arrived in Botany Bay in January 1788. It consisted of more than a thousand settlers, including 736 convicts. The fleet soon moved to the more suitable Port Jackson where a settlement was established at Sydney Cove on 26 January 1788. The colony of New South Wales was formally proclaimed by Governor Phillip on 7 February 1788. Sydney Cove offered a fresh water supply and a safe harbour, which Philip described as being, 'with out exception the finest Harbour in the World [...] Here a Thousand Sail of the Line may ride in the most perfect Security'.

The settlement was planned to be a self-sufficient penal colony based on subsistence agriculture. Trade and ship building were banned in order to keep the convicts isolated. However, the soil around the settlement proved poor and the first crops failed, leading to several years of hunger and strict food rationing. The food crisis was relieved with the arrival of the Second Fleet in mid-1790 and the Third Fleet in 1791. Former convicts received small grants of land, and government and private farms spread to the more fertile lands around Parramatta, Windsor and Camden on the Cumberland Plain. By 1804, the colony was self-sufficient in food.

Phillip had been given no instructions for urban development, but in July 1788 submitted a plan for the new town at Sydney Cove. It included a wide central avenue, a permanent Government House, law courts, hospital and other public buildings, but no provision for warehouses, shops, or other commercial buildings. Phillip promptly ignored his own plan, and unplanned development became a feature of Sydney's topography.

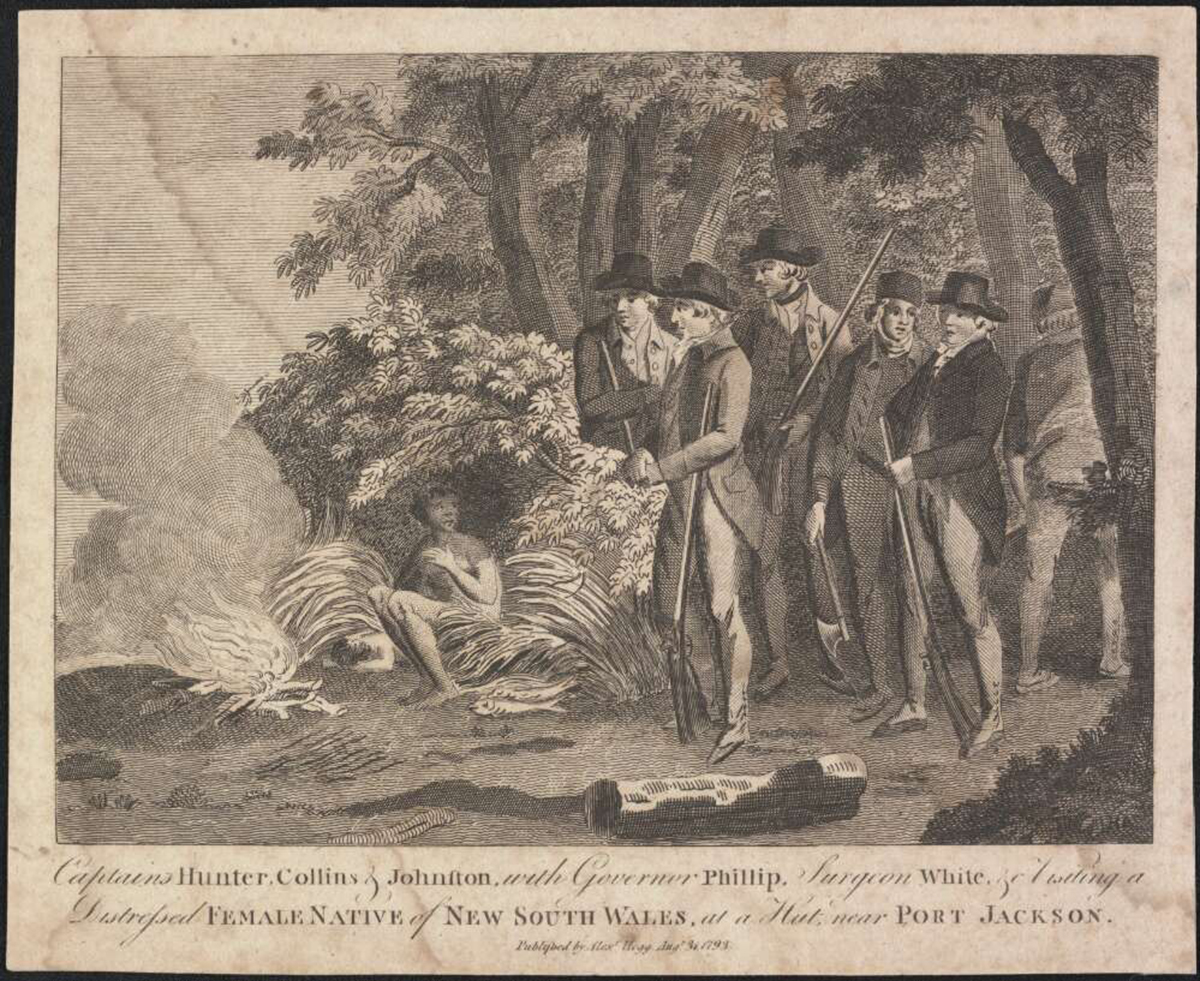
Captains Hunter, Collins and Johnston with Governor Phillip, Surgeon White visiting a distressed female native of New South Wales at a hut near Port Jackson 1793 - Alexander Hogg

=== Disease and dispossession ===
The relative isolation of the Aboriginal population for some 60,000 years meant that they had little resistance to many introduced diseases. An outbreak of smallpox in April 1789 killed about half the Aboriginal population of the Sydney region while only one death was recorded among the settlers. The source of the outbreak is controversial; some researchers contend that it originated from contact with Indonesian fisherman in the far north and spread along Aboriginal trade routes while others argue that it is more likely to have been deliberately spread by settlers.

In November 1790, Bennelong led a group of survivors of the Sydney clans into the settlement, establishing a continuous presence of Aboriginal Australians in settled Sydney.

=== Conflict on the Cumberland Plain ===
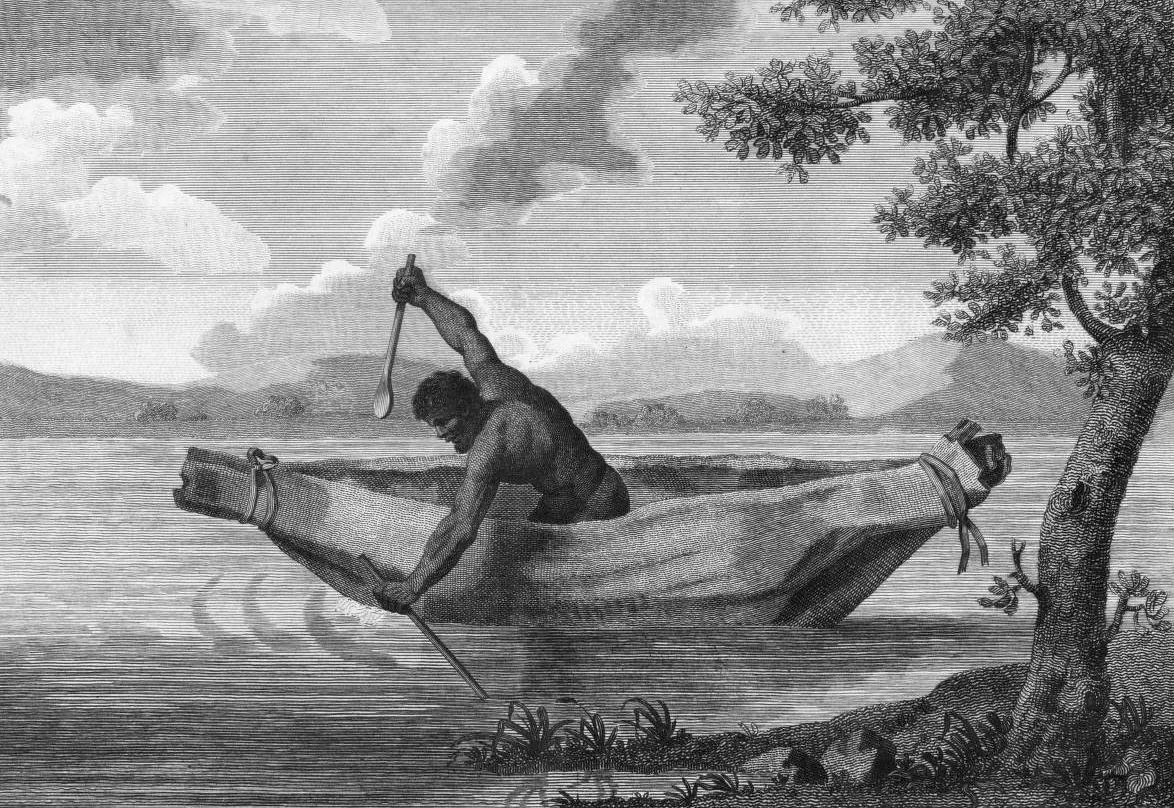
Aboriginal fighter Pemulwuy

As the colony spread to the more fertile lands of the Cumberland Plain around the Hawkesbury river, north-west of Sydney, conflict between the settlers and the Darug people intensified, reaching a peak from 1794 to 1810. Bands of Darug people, led by Pemulwuy and later by his son Tedbury, burned crops, killed livestock and raided settler huts and stores in a pattern of resistance that was to be repeated as the colonial frontier expanded. A military garrison was established on the Hawkesbury in 1795. The death toll from 1794 to 1800 was 26 settlers and up to 200 Darug.

Conflict again erupted from 1814 to 1816 with the expansion of the colony into Dharawal country in the Nepean region south-west of Sydney. Following the deaths of several settlers, Governor Macquarie despatched three military detachments into Dharawal lands, culminating in the Appin massacre (April 1816) in which at least 14 Aboriginal people were killed.

== Sydney Town ==
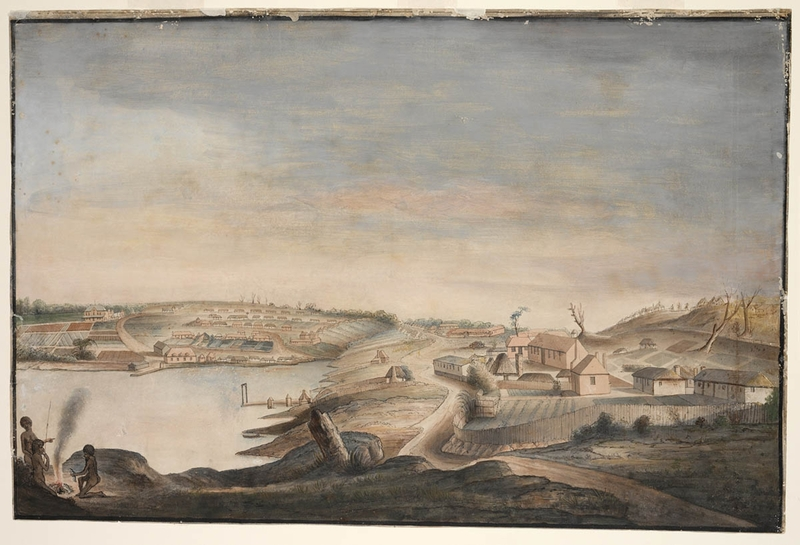
View of Sydney Cove (circa 1794 – 1796) – Thomas Watling

After the departure of Phillip in December 1792, the colony's military officers began acquiring land and importing consumer goods obtained from visiting ships. Former convicts also engaged in trade and opened small businesses. Soldiers and former convicts built houses on Crown land, with or without official permission, in what was now commonly called Sydney town.

In 1804, Irish convicts led around 300 rebels in the Castle Hill Rebellion, an attempt to march on Sydney, commandeer a ship, and sail to freedom. Poorly armed, and with their leader Philip Cunningham captured, the main body of insurgents were routed by about 100 troops and volunteers at Rouse Hill. At least 39 convicts were killed in the uprising and subsequent executions.

Governor William Bligh (1806–08) imposed restrictions on trade and commerce in the town and ordered the demolition of buildings erected on Crown land, including some owned by past and serving military officers. The resulting conflict culminated in the Rum Rebellion of 1808, in which Bligh was deposed by the New South Wales Corps.

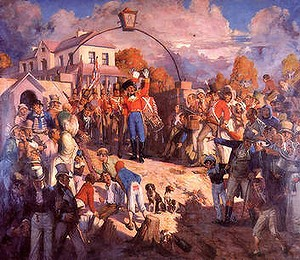
The Rum Rebellion of 1808

Following a brief period of military rule, Bligh was succeeded by Governor Lachlan Macquarie in 1810.

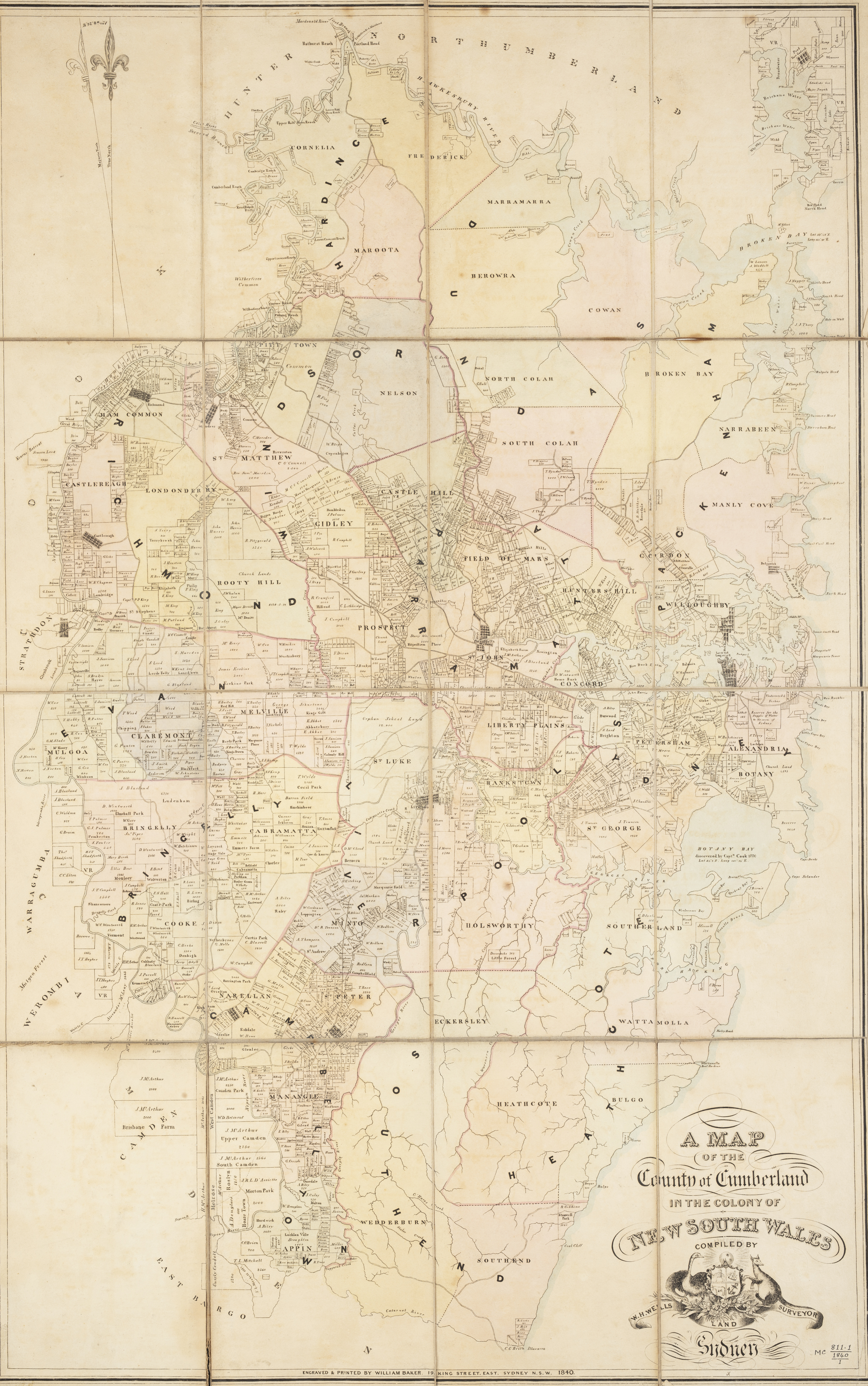
Map of the County of Cumberland in the Colony of New South Wales, Sydney, 1840, compiled William Henry Wells

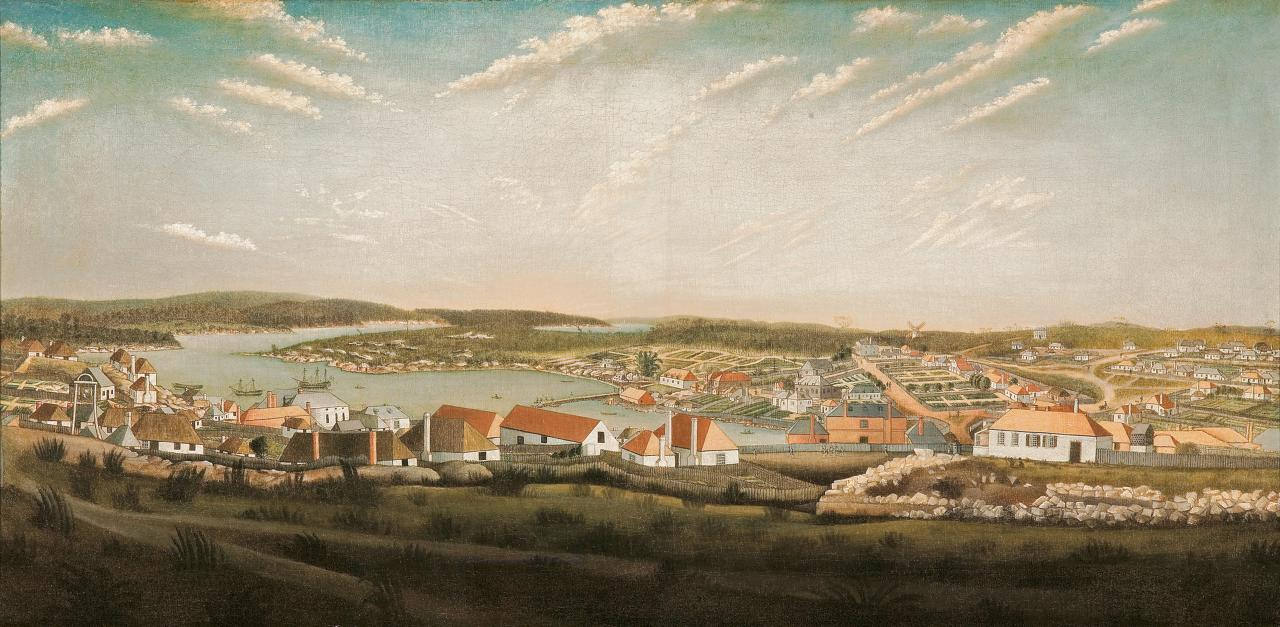
The colony in 1799

Macquarie served as the last autocratic Governor of New South Wales from 1810 to 1821 and had a leading role in the social and economic development of Sydney which saw it transition from a penal colony to a budding free society. He establishing a bank, a currency and a hospital. He employed a planner to design the street layout of Sydney and commissioned the construction of roads, wharves, churches, and public buildings. Parramatta Road, linking Sydney and Parramatta, was opened in 1811 and a road across the Blue Mountains was completed in 1815, opening the way for large scale farming and grazing in the lightly wooded pastures west of the Great Dividing Range.

Central to Macquarie's policy was his treatment of the emancipists, whom he decreed should be treated as social equals to free settlers in the colony. Against opposition, he appointed emancipists to key government positions including Francis Greenway as colonial architect and William Redfern as a magistrate. London judged his public works to be too expensive and society was scandalised by his treatment of emancipists.

Following the departure of Macquarie in 1821, official policy encouraged the emigration of free British settlers to New South Wales. Immigration to the colony increased from 900 free settlers in 1826–30 to 29,000 in 1836–40, many of whom settled in Sydney. By the 1840s Sydney exhibited a geographic divide between poor and working class residents living west of the Tank Stream in areas such as The Rocks, and the more affluent residents living to its east. Free settlers, free-born residents and former convicts now represented the vast majority of the population of Sydney, leading to increasing public agitation for responsible government and an end to transportation. Transportation to New South Wales ceased in 1840.

== Colonial city (1841–1900) ==
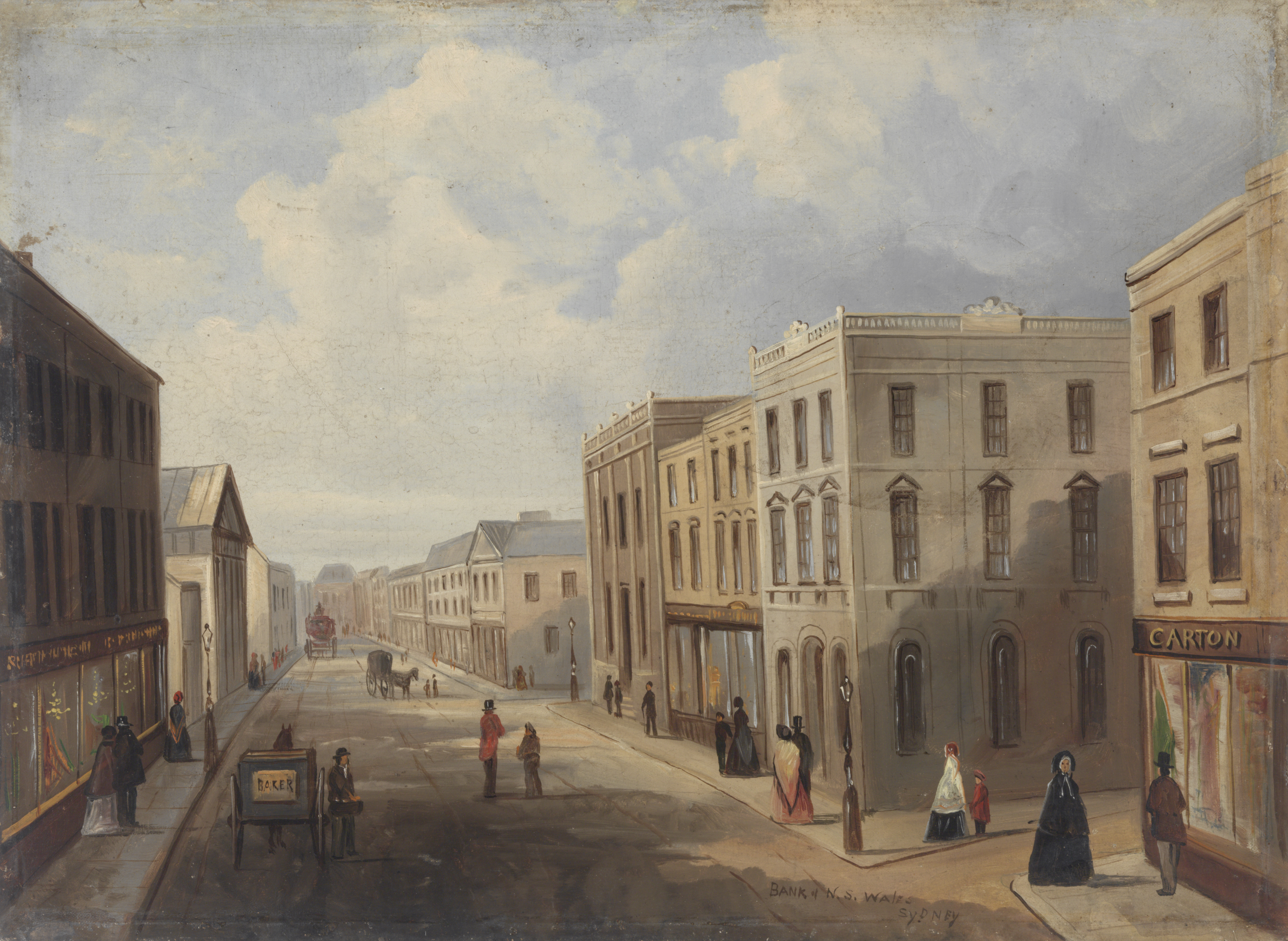
George Street, Sydney, ca. 1855

The New South Wales Legislative Council was transformed into a semi-elected body in 1842. The town of Sydney was declared a city the same year, and a governing council established, elected on a restrictive property franchise.

The discovery of gold in New South Wales and Victoria in 1851 initially caused some economic disruption as male workers moved to the goldfields. Melbourne soon overtook Sydney as Australia's largest city, leading to an enduring rivalry between the two cities. However, increased immigration from overseas and wealth from gold exports increased demand for housing, consumer goods, services and urban amenities. The New South Wales government also stimulated growth by investing heavily in railways, trams, roads, ports, telegraph, schools and urban services. The population of Sydney and its suburbs grew from 95,600 in 1861 to 386,900 in 1891. The city developed many of its characteristic features. The growing population packed into rows of terrace houses in narrow streets. New public buildings of sandstone abounded, including at the University of Sydney (1854–61), the Australian Museum (1858–66), the Town Hall (1868–88), and the General Post Office (1866–92). Elaborate coffee palaces and hotels were erected. Exotic plants such as jacarandas and frangipani were introduced in parks and gardens. Daylight bathing at Sydney's beaches was banned, but segregated bathing at designated ocean baths was popular.

Panorama of Sydney from Lavender Bay, 1875, by Bernard Otto Holtermann and Charles Bayliss

Drought, the winding down of public works and a financial crisis led to economic depression in Sydney throughout most of the 1890s. Meanwhile, the Sydney-based premier of New South Wales, George Reid, became a key figure in the process of federation.

== Political development ==
The first government established in Sydney after 1788 was an autocratic system run by an appointed governor – although English law was transplanted into the Australian colonies by virtue of the doctrine of reception, thus notions of the rights and processes established by the Magna Carta of 1215 and the Bill of Rights of 1689 were brought from Britain by the colonists. Agitation for representative government began soon after the settlement of the colonies.

The opening of Australia's first elected Legislative Council in Sydney, 1843

The oldest legislative body in Australia, the New South Wales Legislative Council, was created in Sydney in 1825 as an appointed body to advise the Governor of New South Wales. The northern wing of Macquarie Street's's Rum Hospital was requisitioned and converted to accommodate the first Parliament House in 1829, as it was the largest building available in Sydney at the time.

William Wentworth established the Australian Patriotic Association (Australia's first political party) in 1835 to demand democratic government for New South Wales. The reformist attorney general, John Plunkett, sought to apply Enlightenment principles to governance in the colony, pursuing the establishment of equality before the law, by extending jury rights to emancipists, then legal protections to convicts, assigned servants and Aborigines and legal equality between Anglicans, Catholics, Presbyterians and later Methodists.

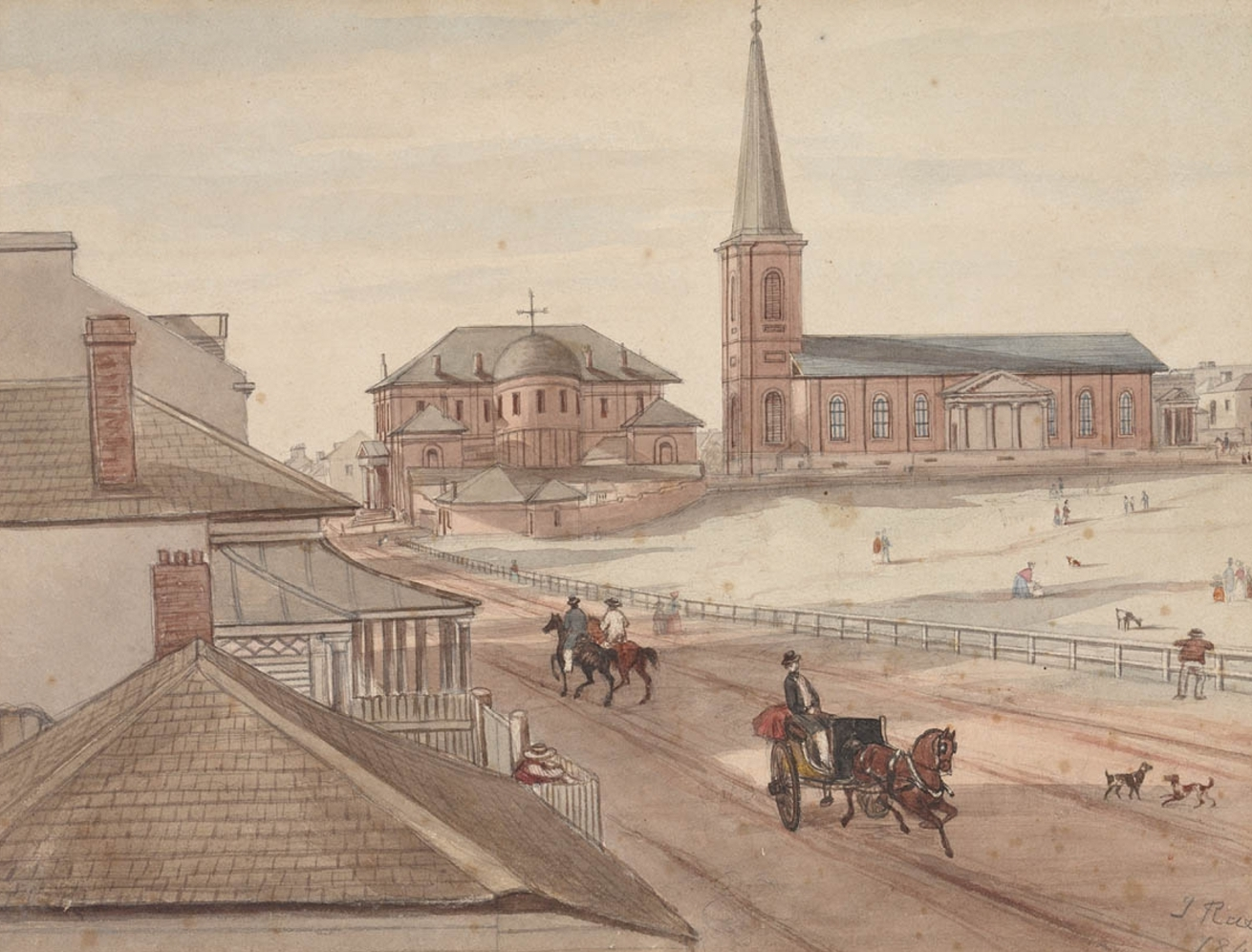
The Supreme Court of New South Wales; one of the earliest established courts in Australia, pictured alongside St James' Church in 1842

In 1838, the celebrated humanitarian Caroline Chisholm arrived at Sydney and soon after began her work to alleviate the conditions for the poor women migrants. She met every immigrant ship at the docks, found positions for immigrant girls and established a Female Immigrants' Home. Later she began campaigning for legal reform to alleviate poverty and assist female immigration and family support in the colonies.

The passing of the Sydney Incorporation Act in 1842 officially recognised the town of Sydney as a city, enabled the taxation of property owners and occupiers, and imposed a managerial structure to its administration. Men who possessed property valued at £1000 (or £50 per year) were able to stand for election. Every adult male over 21 years who occupied a "house warehouse counting-house or shop" valued at £25 per year was permitted to vote in one of four wards – this amounted to only around 15% of the adult population. Plural voting was prohibited by the enabling legislation. Australia's first parliamentary elections were conducted for the New South Wales Legislative Council in 1843, again with voting rights (for males only) tied to property ownership or financial capacity.

The first elected aldermen met in public houses, among their constituents, but began campaigning for a civic hall. They chose the run down site of Sydney's first official European cemetery: on George Street, in the commercial heart of the city and organised for Sydney's first royal visitor, HRH Prince Alfred, Duke of Edinburgh, to lay a foundation stone on 4 April 1868, even before colonial authorities on Macquarie Street had approved the plan. That same year, a design for the Sydney Town Hall by architect J. H. Willson was chosen which took its inspiration from the French style of the Hotel de Ville de Paris. To this day, the Hall remains the civic office of the Lord Mayor of Sydney and aldermen of the City Council.

The end of convict transportation and the rapid growth of population following the Australian gold rushes led to further demands for "British institutions" in New South Wales, which meant an elected parliament and responsible government. In 1851 the franchise for the Legislative Council was expanded and 1857 saw the granting of the right to vote to all male British subjects 21 years or over in New South Wales and from the 1860s onwards government in New South Wales became increasingly stable and assured.

== Cultural development ==
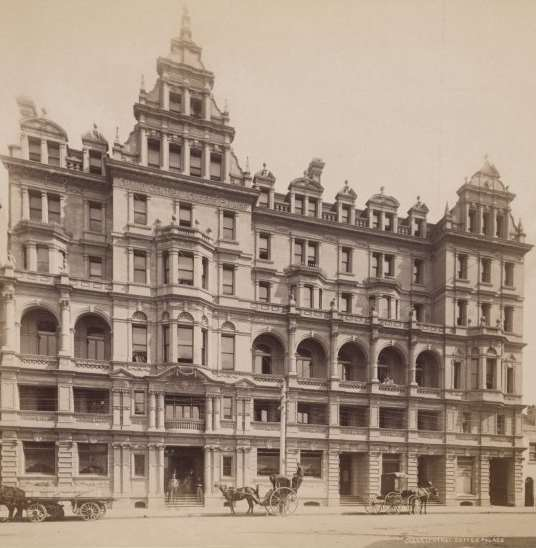
Grand Central Coffee Palace in the 1890s. At the height of the Victorian era in Australia, ornate temperance coffee palaces were constructed as a reflection of the wealth of the country.

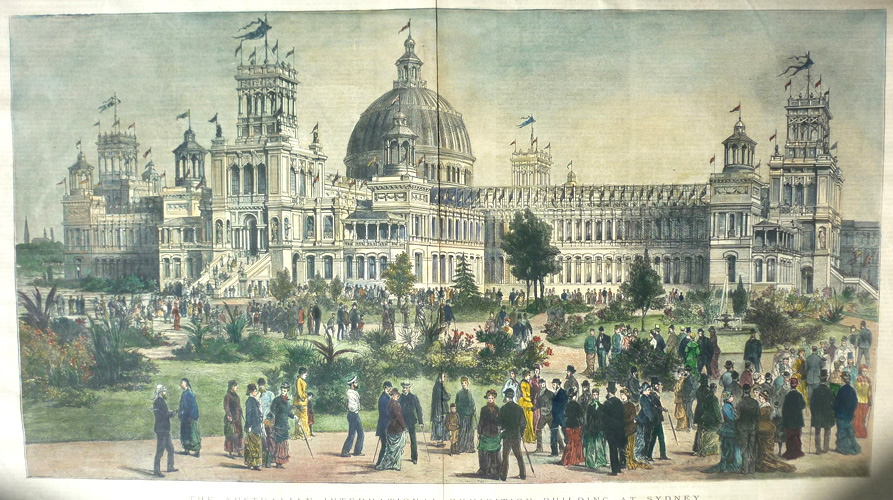
The Garden Palace in 1879

Over the course of the 19th-century Sydney established many of its major cultural institutions. Governor Lachlan Macquarie's vision for Sydney included the construction of grand public buildings and institutions fit for a colonial capital. Macquarie Street began to take shape as a ceremonial thoroughfare of grand buildings. He founded the Royal Botanic Gardens and dedicated Hyde Park to the "recreation and amusement of the inhabitants of the town and a field of exercises for the troops".

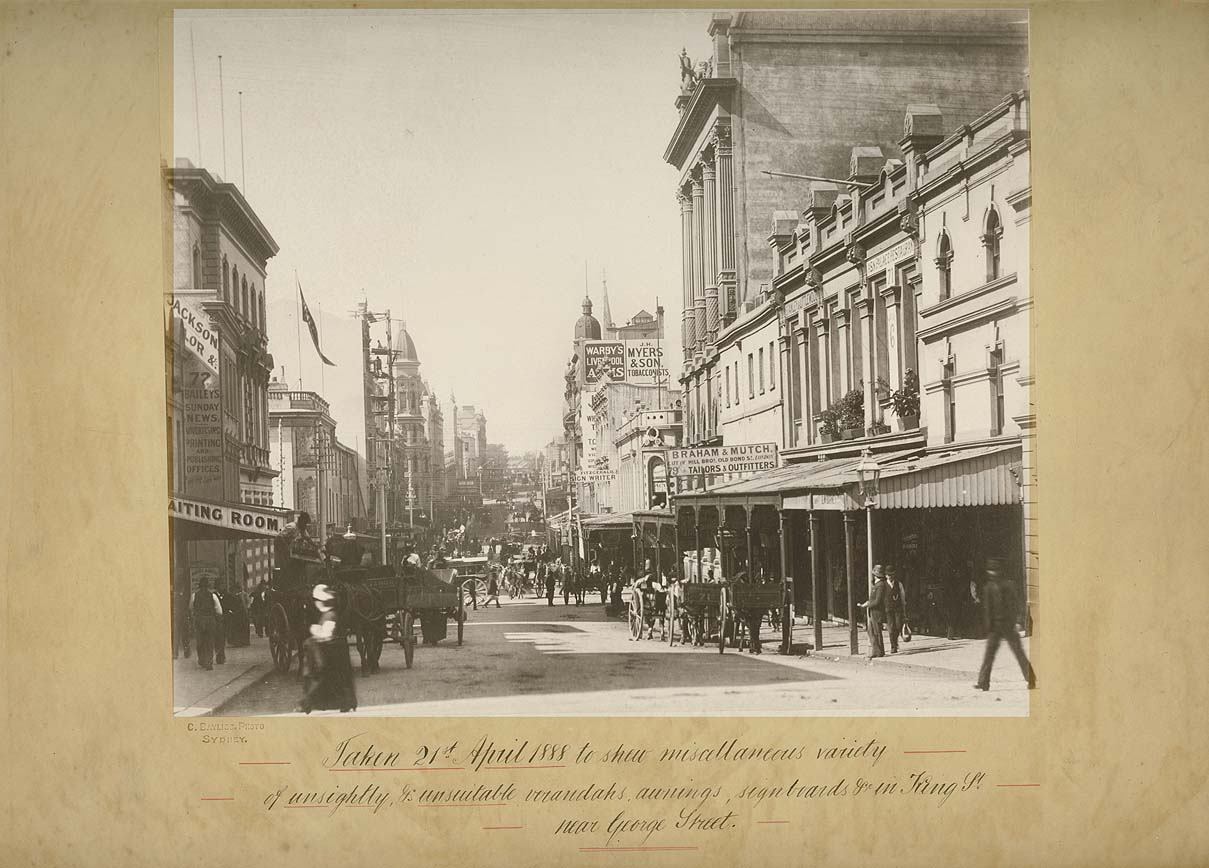
King Street in 1888

Macquarie set aside a large portion of land for an Anglican Cathedral and laid the foundation stone for the first St Mary's Catholic Cathedral in 1821. St Andrew's Anglican Cathedral, though more modest in size than Macquarie's original vision, later began construction and, after fire and setbacks, the present St Mary's Catholic Cathedral foundation stone was laid in 1868, from which rose a towering gothic-revival landmark. Religious groups were also responsible for many of the philanthropic activities in Sydney. One of these was the Sydney Female Refuge Society set up to care for prostitutes in 1848.

The first Sydney Royal Easter Show, an agricultural exhibition, began in 1823. Alexander Macleay started collecting the exhibits of Australia's oldest museum–Sydney's Australian Museum–in 1826 and the current building opened to the public in 1857. The University of Sydney was established in 1850. The Royal National Park, south of the city opened in 1879 (second only to Yellowstone National Park in the USA).

An academy of art formed in 1870 and the present Art Gallery of New South Wales building began construction in 1896. Inspired by the works of French impressionism, artists camps formed around the foreshores of Sydney Harbour in the 1880s and 1890s at idyllique locations such as Balmoral Beach and Curlew Camp in Sirius Cove. Artists such as Arthur Streeton and Tom Roberts of the Heidelberg School worked here at this time and created some of the masterpieces of newly developing and distinctively Australian styles of painting.

Australia's first rugby union club, the Sydney University Football Club, was founded in Sydney in the year 1863. The New South Wales Rugby Union (or then, The Southern RU – SRU) was established in 1874, and the tradition of an annual club competition began in Sydney that year. Initially widely popular, the code would later assume secondary popularity in Sydney, when in 1907, the New South Wales Rugby League was established and would grow to be the favourite football code of the city. In 1878 the inaugural first class cricket match at the Sydney Cricket Ground was played between New South Wales and Victoria. The Athletic Association of the Great Public Schools of New South Wales (A.A.G.P.S) was established in Sydney 1892 and interschool rugby and athletics competitions began that year, followed by cricket and rowing the following year.

The Sydney International Exhibition of 1879 showcased the colonial capital to the world. Some exhibits from this event were kept to constitute the original collection of the new Technological, Industrial and Sanitary Museum of New South Wales (today's Powerhouse Museum).

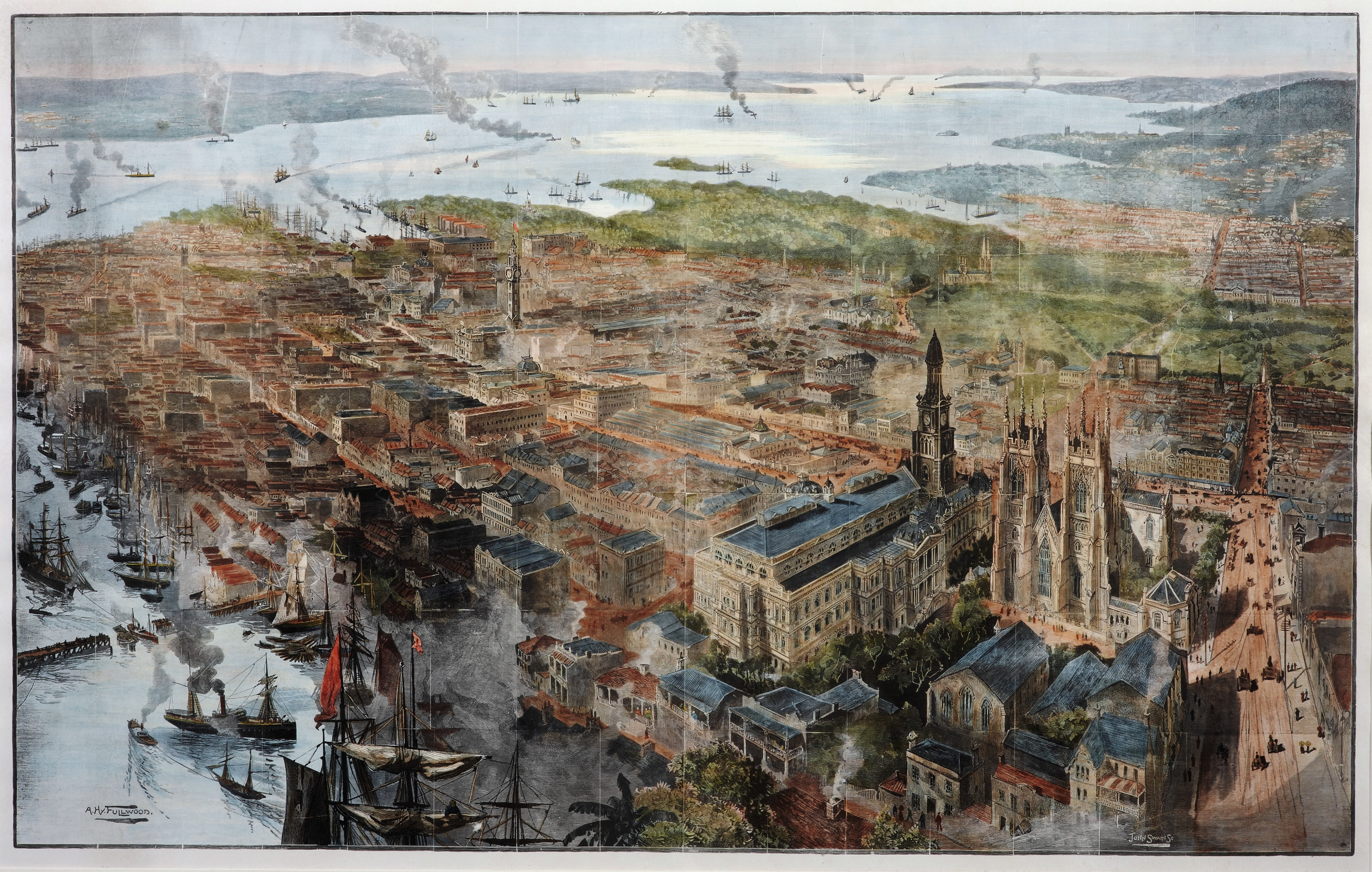
Bird's Eye View of Sydney, 1888 - A. H. Fullwood, with the Sydney Town Hall pictured in the bottom left

Many grand public buildings were built during the 19th century. The Romanesque landmark Queen Victoria Building (QVB), designed by George McRae, was completed in 1898 on the site of the old Sydney markets. Built as a monument to the popular and long reigning monarch, Queen Victoria, construction took place while the city was in severe recession and construction of the ornate structure helped employ out of work stonemasons, plasterers, and stained window artists. Restored in the late 20th century, the building remains a boutique shopping and dining hall. Sydney's preservation of heritage buildings, particularly Victorian terrace houses, has drawn comparisons to "parts of London, particularly given the predominance of the London terrace".

Sydney's first newspaper was the Sydney Gazette established, edited and distributed by George Howe. It appeared irregularly between 1803 and 1842, but nonetheless provides a valuable source on the early development of the colony based at Sydney. The Sydney Morning Herald joined the Sydney Gazette as a daily publication in 1831; it continues to be published to this day.

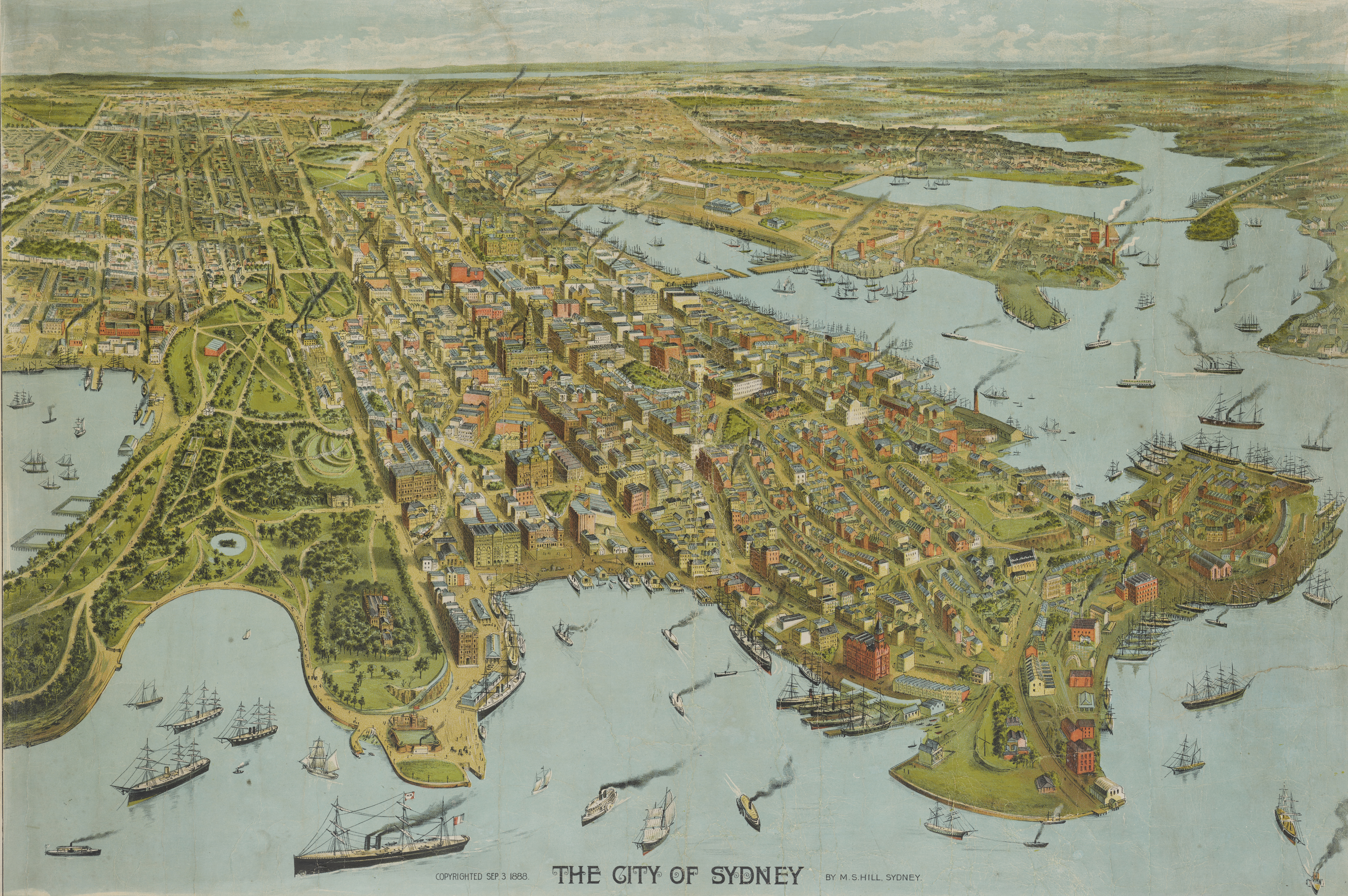
Bird's-eye view of Sydney Cove and surrounds, 1888

Two Sydney journalists, J. F. Archibald and John Haynes, founded The Bulletin magazine; the first edition appeared on 31 January 1880. It was intended to be a journal of political and business commentary, with some literary content. Initially radical, nationalist, democratic, and racist, it gained wide influence and became a celebrated entry-point to publication for Australian writers and cartoonists such as Henry Lawson, Banjo Paterson, Miles Franklin, and the illustrator and novelist Norman Lindsay.

== Transport ==
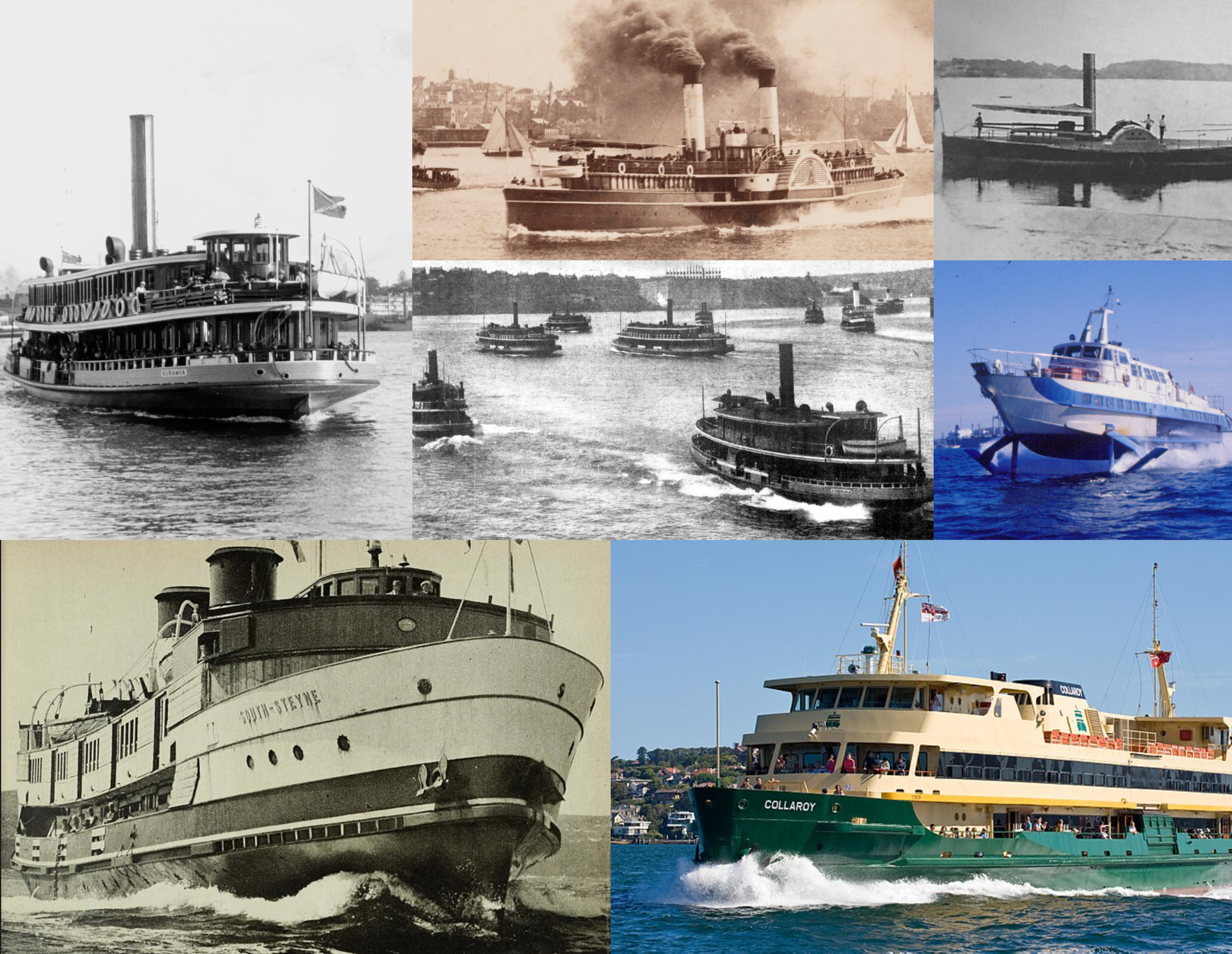
Top to bottom and left to right, Kuramia (1914–1934), PS Brighton (1883–1916), PS Herald (1855–1884), K-class ferries in Sydney Cove, hydrofoil Curl Curl (1973–1992), South Steyne (1938–1974), Collaroy (1988–)

=== Roads ===
In 1939 the Department of Main Roads decided to make a comprehensive study of future Sydney Metropolitan Main Road needs, on a more comprehensive basis than had previously been attempted. This study was interrupted by the war. Landuse and population data was compiled into a 1945 report with the aid of aerial photos. Early work was included in a 1946 paper. The DMR’s land use and population surveys were published in 1946 as Part A of the “Main Roads Development Plan for Sydney Metropolitan and County of Cumberland” and became the basis of the Cumberland County Council (New South Wales)’s study. The DMR was "almost totally successful" in having the Cumberland County Council (New South Wales) adopt "what was nominally part B" of the Main Roads Development Plan. The Main Roads Development Plan was never published (Note: As of 1988) and was never analysed or justified by the DMR or Cumberland County Council (New South Wales).

In 1948, the Department of Main Roads developed a plan for a future system of limited access highways for the Sydney metropolitan area.

The first of early comprehensive transport plans for Sydney was a "somewhat desultory" origin-destination survey undertaken by De Leuw Cather consultants in 1960. Charles E . De Leuw acknowledged the assistance of the press in soliciting cooperation of citizens.

The proposed routes of the Western Expressway, Southern Expressway, North-Western Expressway, Warringah Expressway, Western Distributor and Eastern Distributor were reproduced on a map in the December 1960 origin-destination survey. The only labelled interchange was Ultimo Interchange. (Note: Chart titled "Proposed Expressways - Sydney Area")

The "design year" for the 1961 De Leuw Cather (DLC) Geometric Design Study was 1980. The complete system of future expressways was reproduced "as first proposed by the Department of Main Roads in 1948". The first (1948) study network was deemed "adequate" for 1960 traffic demand, but was forecast to only accommodate 45% of 1980 demand, as too many routes would converge in the Ultimo area.

The DLC study recommended a revised expressway network provided routes to bypass the downtown Sydney area, including removal of the North Western Expressway from the Ultimo Interchange, addition of a North-South Expressway and new harbour crossing, addition of an east-west expressway, and an expressway link between the Northwestern and Western Expressways near Haberfield.

The engagement of the 1961 DLC report didn't include detailed location or geometric design for the newly proposed portions of the expressway system. The revised system included an interchange at the approximate site of the Rozelle Interchange, and an interchange at the approximate location of Enmore Road / Stanmore Road / Edgeware Road. The unbuilt east-west expressway was proposed from approximately Victoria Road at Darling Street, intersecting with the Western Expressway west of Haberfield (approximately at the present day Wattle Street Offramp of the M4), through the new interchange (approximately Enmore Road / Stanmore road / Edgeware Road), intersecting the Southern Expressway east of the current Sydney Park Road and Euston Road intersection, crossing the Green Square railway station intersection, crossing the intersection at Alison Road and Anzac Parade (the proposed intersection in the ultimate concept design of the Alexandria to Moore Park Project), and approximately following Lang Road terminating at Syd Einfield Drive. (Note: Map titled "Revised Study Network".)

On Thursday 4 July 1963, the Cumberland County Council adopted a report by chief planner Rod Fraser and opposed the expressway recommendations. On Friday 5 July 1963, The Minister for Highways Pat Hills called on the Cumberland County Council to make constructive criticisms of the newly proposed expressway.

Between the August 1961 study and May 1963, the Municipality of Woollahra requested the Department of Main Roads give consideration to a Port Jackson Expressway. This was proposed to begin at the Cahill Expressway and extend along the south shore of the harbour to New South Head Road "just beyond the Double Bay business centre".

Rod Fraser, Chief County Planner of the Cumberland County Council), wrote a 1964 report criticising the 1961 report. Most copies of the 1964 report were "mysteriously destroyed". Nigel Ashton, reportedly acting on Pat Hills instructions, ordered Mr. Fraser's report to be "pulped". The report was described as "political dynamite". Pat Hills said he had not ordered the "pulping" of the report. Pat Morton, the Minister for Local Government and Highways, said he had not heard of Rod Fraser's report and would make inquiries. The "Civic Roundsman" author in the Daily Telegraph wrote they had "one of the few, if not the only" copy of the printed report.

In October 1977, the State Government abandoned the corridor reservation for the North Western Expressway between Harris Street, Pyrmont and the Gladesville Bridge, and to sell off the properties acquired so far along this section. The reservation for the Western Expressway between Ultimo and Strathfield was abandoned later in 1977.

Around 1978, Neville Wran appointed David Kirby to conduct two inquiries into freeway proposals being pursued by the Department of Main Roads.

The report suggested the existing road network would continue to function even if the Department of Main Roads did nothing, and that new roads increase travel rather than reduce it. An internal report prepared for the Department of Main Roads report contended if the same argument would be used against in the field of education, health or housing, and regarding the finding that "new roads tend to increase trip length" claimed "if the road is located in an efficient location it is quite likely that trip lengths could be significantly shorter".

Sydney avoided building extensive motorways until the late 1980s by implementing the Sydney Coordinated Adaptive Traffic System, and other traffic management such as clearways.

In 1987, Laurie Brereton announced the Department of Main Roads abandoned a number of proposed freeways, link roads and road widenings. This made 176 properties owned by the DMR for sale. 36 road corridors were abandoned. The profits of the sales were promised to be used for road building.

There are a number of past and current proposed roads in Sydney.

=== Ferries ===
Ferries have played a key role in the transport and economic development of the city. Leading up to the 1932 opening of the Sydney Harbour bridge, Sydney had the world's largest ferry fleet.

From the time of the first European settlement in Sydney Cove, slow and sporadic boats ran along the Parramatta River serving Parramatta and the agricultural settlements in between. By the mid-1830s, speculative ventures established regular services. From the late-nineteenth century the North Shore developed rapidly. A rail connection to Milsons Point took alighting ferry passengers up the North Shore line to Hornsby via North Sydney. Without a bridge connection, increasingly large fleets of steamers serviced the cross harbour routes and in the early twentieth century, Sydney Ferries Limited was the largest ferry operator in the world.

Arguably the most well-known is the Manly ferry service, and its large ship-like ferries that negotiate the beam swells of the Sydney Heads. From the mid-nineteenth century, the Port Jackson and Manly Steamship Company and its forerunners ran commuter and weekend exclusioner services to the beach-side suburb.

The 1932 opening of the Sydney Harbour Bridge dramatically and permanently changed Sydney Harbour. Sydney Ferries Limited annual patronage fell from 40 million to 15 million almost immediately. The hardships of the Great Depression and Second World War slowed the ferries' decline, but by 1951 the NSW State Government was forced to take over the ailing Sydney Ferries Limited. The Port Jackson company had fared better and their peak year was 1946, after which a slow decline saw it too taken over by the NSW State Government in the 1970s. Ferry operations were privatised in 2015 with vessels and facilities remaining in public ownership.

=== Trams ===
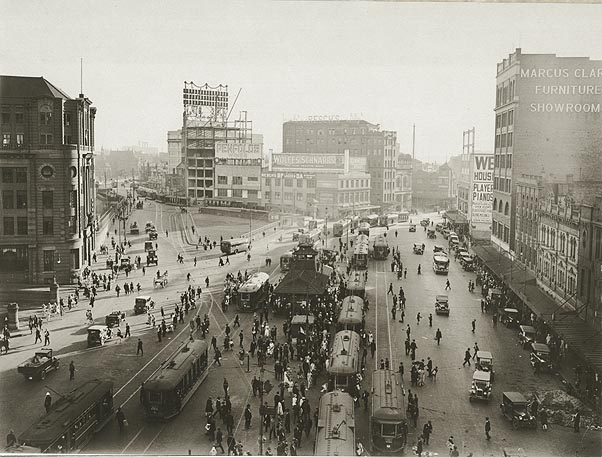
Early tram routes through Railway Square

Sydney once had the largest tram system in Australia, the second largest in the British Commonwealth (after London), and one of the largest in the world. It was extremely intensively worked, with about 1,600 cars in service at any one time at its peak during the 1930s (cf. about 500 trams in Melbourne today).

Sydney's first tram was horse-drawn, running from the old Sydney Railway station to Circular Quay along Pitt Street. Built in 1861, the design was compromised by the desire to haul railway freight wagons along the line to supply city businesses, in addition to passenger traffic. This resulted in a track that protruded from the road surface and damaged the wheels of wagons trying to cross it. Hard campaigning by competing omnibus owners – as well as the fatal accident involving the leading Australian musician Isaac Nathan in 1864 – led to closure in 1866.

In 1879 a steam tramway was established. The System was a great success and the network expanded rapidly through the city and inner suburbs. There were also two cable tram routes, to Ocean Street (Edgecliff) and in North Sydney, later extended to Crows Nest, because of the steep terrain involved.

Electrification started in 1898, and most of the system was converted by 1910. The privately owned Parramatta to Redbank Wharf (Duck River) steam tram remained until 1943.

By the 1920s, the system had reached its maximum extent. The overcrowded and heaving trams running at a high frequency, in competition with growing private motor car and bus use, created congestion. Competition from the private car, private bus operators and the perception of traffic congestion led to the gradual closure of lines from the 1940s. Overseas transport experts were called upon to advise the city on its post-war transport issues and recommended closure of the system, but generally went against public opinion. Nevertheless, closure became Labor government policy and the system was wound down in stages, with withdrawal of the last service, to La Perouse, in 1961.

== 20th century ==
=== Federation, Great War and Great Depression ===
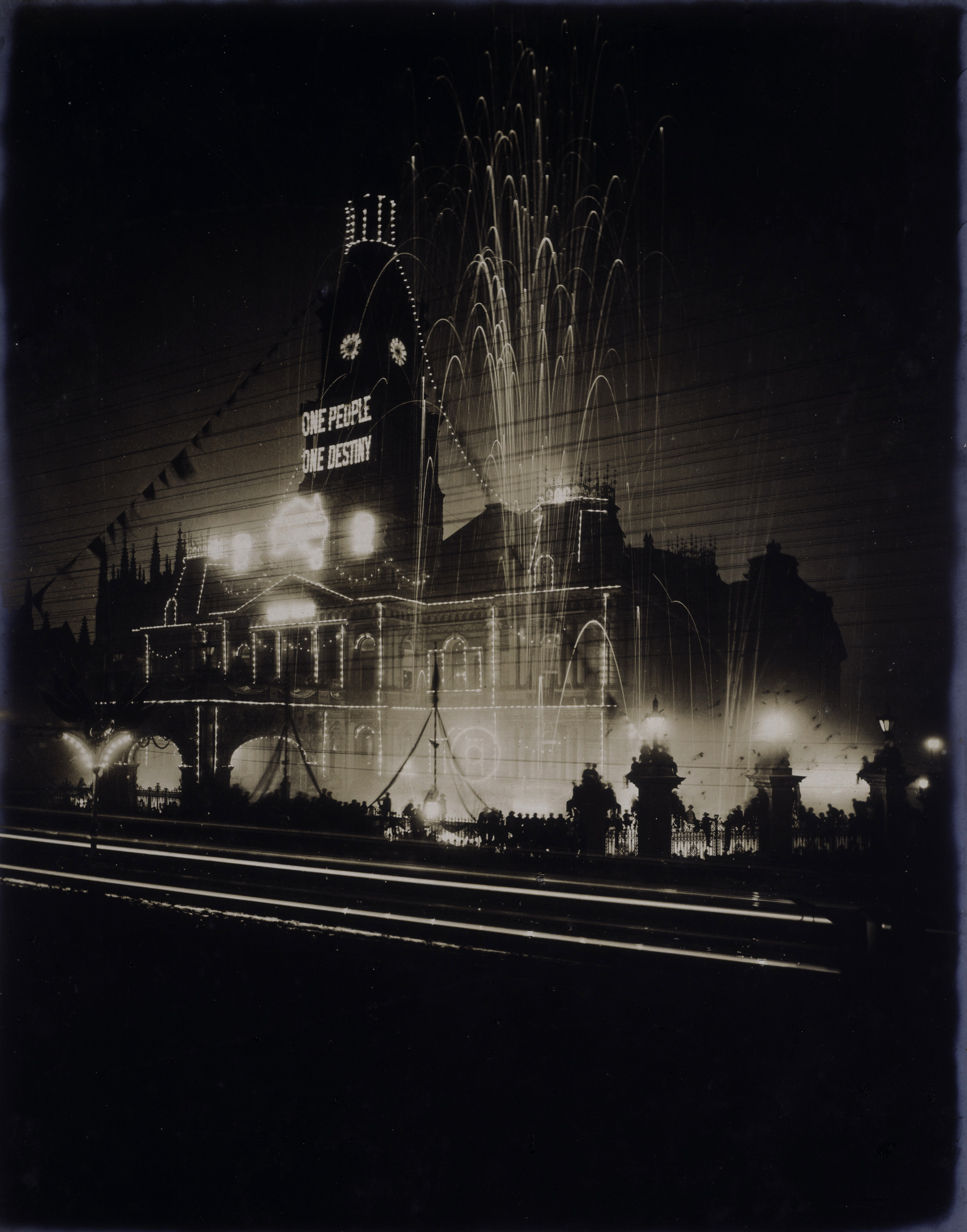
The Sydney Town Hall illuminated at night for the Inauguration of the Commonwealth of Australia, 1901

When the six colonies federated on 1 January 1901, Sydney became the capital of the State of New South Wales. The spread of bubonic plague in 1900 prompted the new state government to modernise the wharves and demolish inner-city slums. The outbreak of the First World War in 1914 saw more Sydney males volunteer for the armed forces than the Commonwealth authorities could process, and helped reduce unemployment in the city. Those returning from the war in 1918 were promised "homes fit for heroes" in new suburbs such as Daceyville and Matraville. "Garden suburbs" and mixed industrial and residential developments also grew along the rail and tram corridors. After the war, Martin Place was selected as the site for the Sydney Cenotaph which honours the dead and remains a focus for Anzac Day commemorations in the city to this day. The city's main war memorial, the Anzac War Memorial, opened in Hyde Park in 1934.

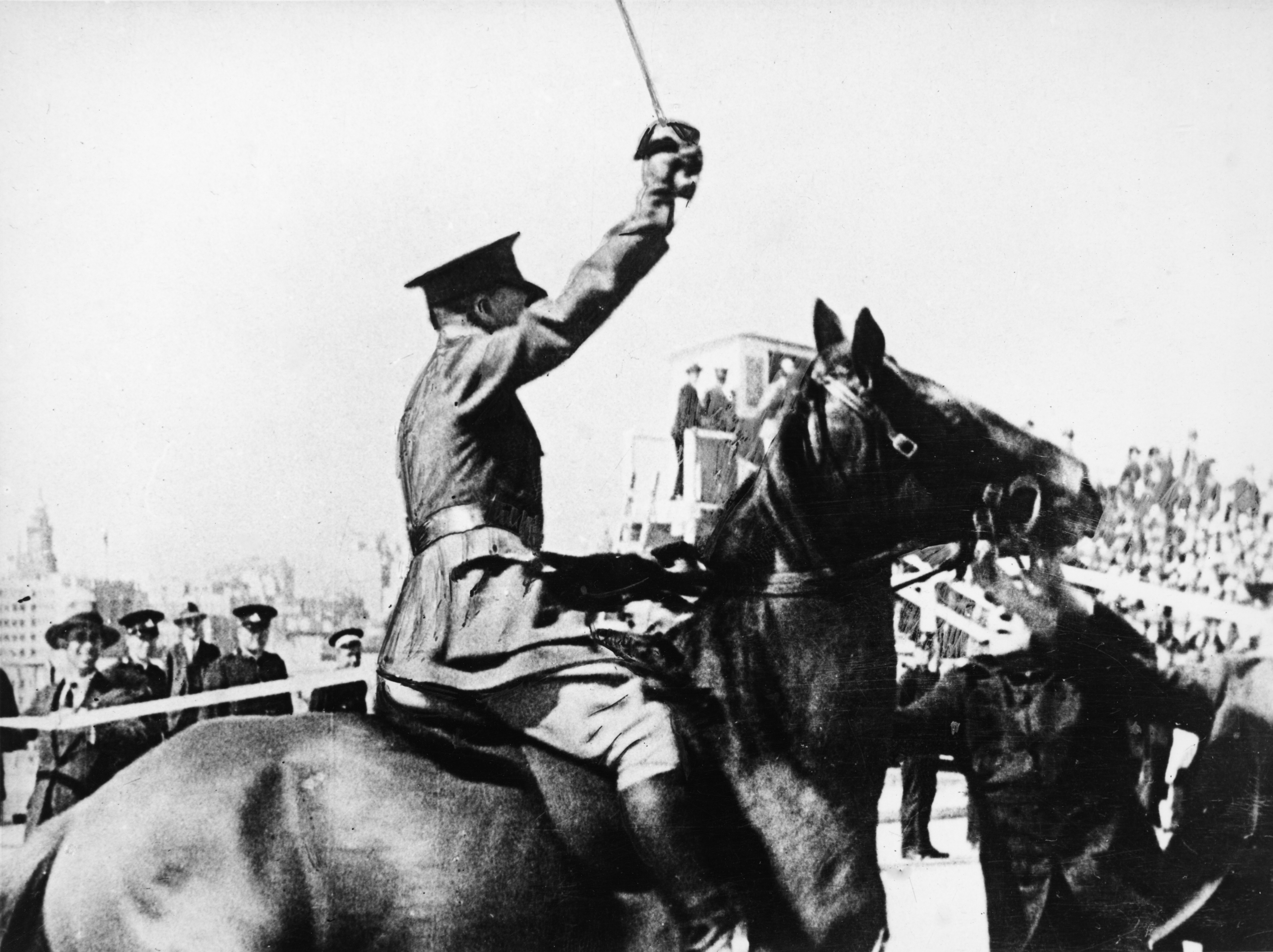
Francis de Groot lunges forward to beat Premier Jack Lang to the cutting of the ribbon to declare the Sydney Harbour Bridge open.

The population reached one million in 1926, after Sydney had regained its position as the most populous city in Australia. The government created jobs with massive public projects such as the electrification of the Sydney rail network and building the Sydney Harbour Bridge.

Sydney was more severely affected by the Great Depression of the 1930s than regional NSW or Melbourne. New building almost came to a standstill, and by 1933 the unemployment rate for male workers was 28 per cent, but over 40 per cent in working class areas such as Alexandria and Redfern. Many families were evicted from their homes and shanty towns grew along coastal Sydney and Botany Bay, the largest being "Happy Valley" at La Perouse. The Depression also exacerbated political divisions. In March 1932, when populist Labor premier Jack Lang attempted to open the Sydney Harbour Bridge he was upstaged by Francis de Groot of the far-right New Guard, who slashed the ribbon with a sabre.

The Sydney Harbour Bridge, which links Sydney's northern and southern shores began construction in 1924 and took 1,400 men eight years to build at a cost of £4.2 million. Sixteen workers were killed during construction. In its first year, the average annual daily traffic was around 11,000 vehicles (by the beginning of the 21st century, the figure stood at around 160,000 vehicles per day).

In January 1938, Sydney celebrated the Empire Games and the sesquicentenary of European settlement in Australia. One journalist wrote, "Golden beaches. Sun tanned men and maidens...Red-roofed villas terraced above the blue waters of the harbour...Even Melbourne seems like some grey and stately city of Northern Europe compared with Sydney's sub-tropical splendours." Meanwhile, a congress of the "Aborigines of Australia", declared 26 January "A Day of Mourning" for "the whiteman's seizure of our country."

==== Culture and recreation ====
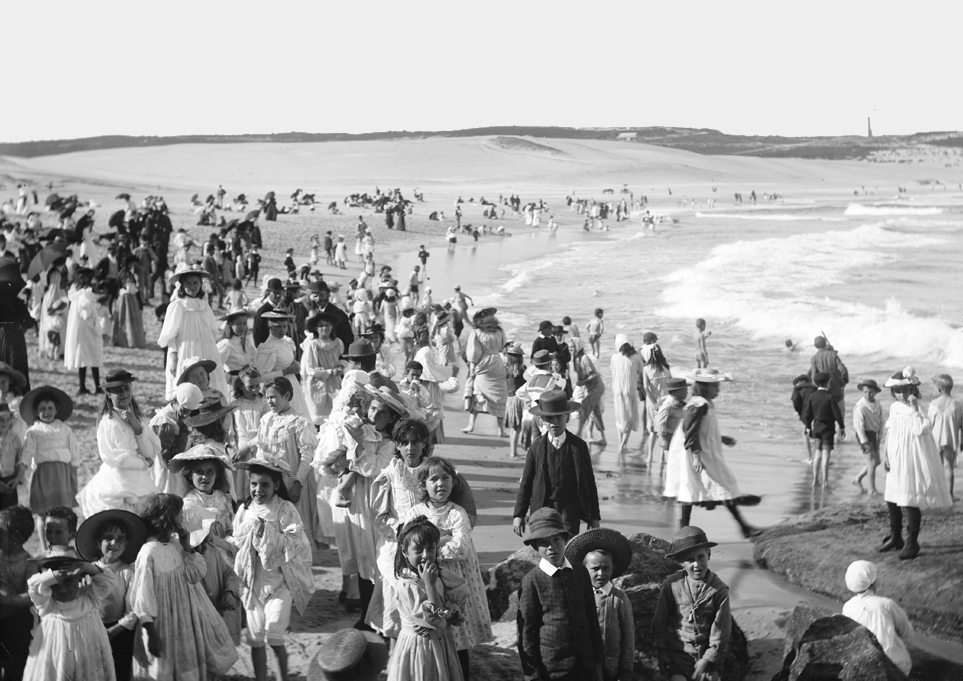
Bondi Beach – a photo from c. 1900 from The Powerhouse Museum. The world's first Surf Life Saving club opened here in 1906.

The first Archibald Prize was awarded in 1921. Now regarded as the most important portraiture prize in Australia, it originated from a bequest from J. F. Archibald, the editor of The Bulletin, who died in 1919. Administered by the Trustees of the Art Gallery of New South Wales, it is awarded for "the best portrait, preferentially of some man or woman distinguished in Art, Letters, Science or Politics." Sydney's opulent Capitol Theatre opened in 1928 and after restoration in the 1990s remains one of the nation's finest auditoriums.

During the 19th century, Sydney's beaches had become popular seaside holiday resorts, but daylight sea bathing was considered indecent until the early 20th century. In defiance of these restrictions, in October 1902, William Gocher, wearing a neck to knee costume, entered the water at Manly Beach only to be escorted from the water by the police – but the following year, Manly Council removed restrictions on all-day bathing – provided neck to knee swimming costumes were worn. Arguably the world's first surf lifesaving club was founded at Bondi Beach, Sydney, in 1906. In the summer of 1915, Duke Kahanamoku of Hawaii introduced surf board riding to Sydney's Freshwater Beach.

In a Sheffield Shield cricket match at the Sydney Cricket Ground in 1930, Don Bradman, a young New South Welshman of just 21 years of age, achieved the highest batting score in first-class cricket with 452 runs not out in just 415 minutes.

=== World War II ===
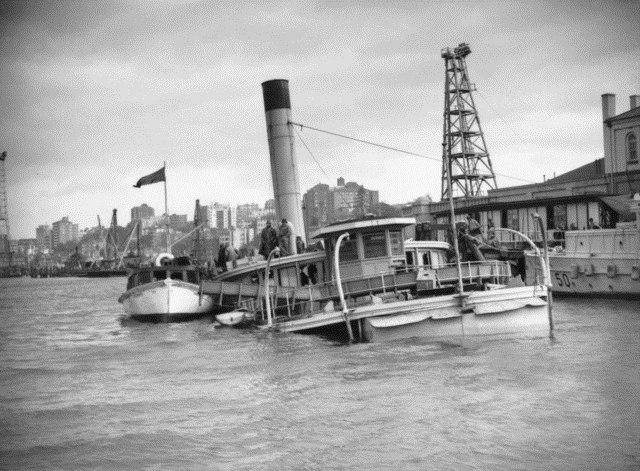
The Kuttabul, sunk by a Japanese midget submarine attack on Sydney Harbour, 1942

With the outbreak of war in September 1939, Sydney experienced a surge in industrial development to meet the needs of a wartime economy. Unemployment virtually disappeared and women moved into jobs previously male preserves. Air raid shelters were built in Hyde Park, the Sydney Domain and the railway tunnels at Circular Quay. Military establishments included the Garden Island Tunnel System, the only tunnel warfare complex in Sydney, and as well as the heritage-listed fortification systems Bradleys Head Fortification Complex and Middle Head Fortifications, which were part of a total defence system for Sydney Harbour.

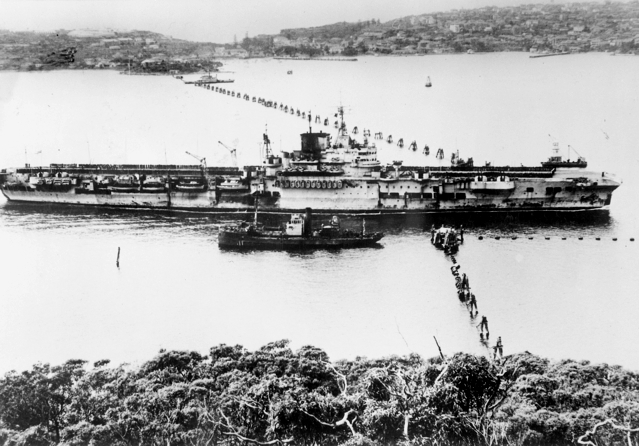
The British aircraft carrier HMS Formidable passing through the anti-submarine boom in Port Jackson (Sydney Harbour) in 1945

After launching their Pacific War in December 1941, the Imperial Japanese Navy infiltrated New South Wales waters and on the night of 31 May–1 June 1942, three midget submarines entered Sydney Harbour to attack shipping located there. One torpedo struck the sea wall against which the converted harbour ferry HMAS Kuttabul was moored. The blast sank the Kuttabul, killing 19 Australian and two British naval personnel who were asleep on board.

In the aftermath of the attack, the Harbour's defences were increased and the Australian population feared Japanese invasion. Amid great controversy, the bodies of the four Japanese submariners responsible for the raid were cremated with full military honors and returned to Japan. Eight days after the first attack, two submarines lying off shore fired shells on Sydney and Newcastle.

Building restrictions meant that most construction in Sydney was confined to public works deemed essential to the war effort such as the Captain Cook Graving Dock at Garden Island and the Concord Repatriation Hospital. Rationing and price controls were extended to items such as rents, food, clothing, petrol, tobacco and liquor.

The war in the Pacific made Sydney the port of choice for American servicemen on rest and recuperation leave, and about a million servicemen and women arrived in Sydney harbour. The city, Kings Cross and Lunar Park proved popular with the Americans and many intimate relationships developed with the women of Sydney. Thousands of Australian war brides moved to the United States with their American husbands after the war.

The new Garden Island shipping dock was opened in March 1945, in time for the British Pacific Fleet to use it in its final push towards Japan.

=== Post war ===
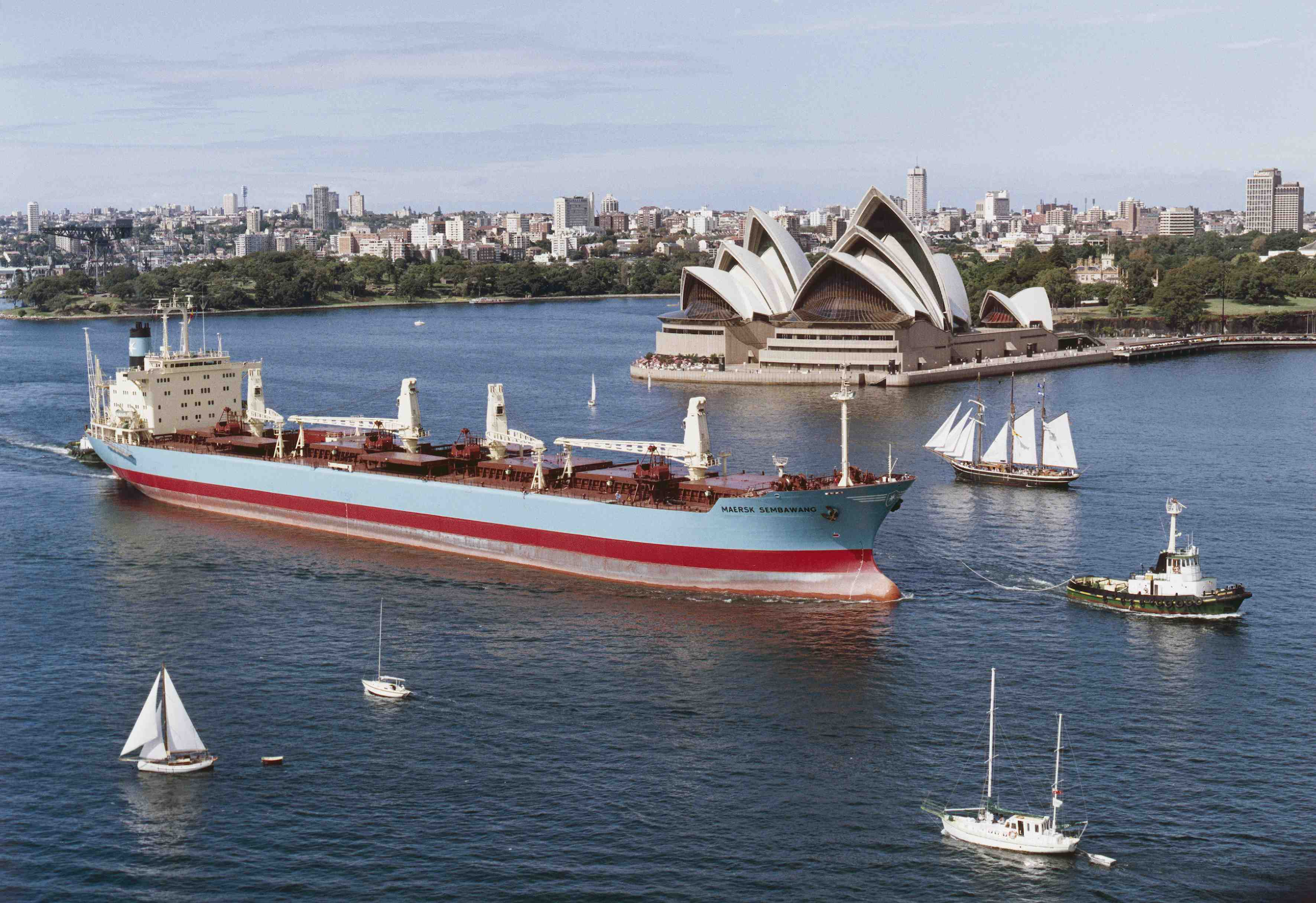
Sydney Harbour, 1984

A post-war immigration and baby boom saw a rapid increase in Sydney's population and the spread of low-density housing in suburbs throughout the Cumberland Plain. Immigrants—mostly from Britain and continental Europe—and their children accounted for over three-quarters of Sydney's population growth between 1947 and 1971. The newly created Cumberland County Council oversaw low-density residential developments, the largest at Green Valley and Mount Druitt. Older residential centres such as Parramatta, Bankstown and Liverpool became suburbs of the metropolis. Manufacturing, protected by high tariffs, employed over a third of the workforce from 1945 to the 1960s. However, as the long post-war economic boom progressed, retail and other service industries became the main source of new jobs.

Increasing high rise development in Sydney and the expansion of suburbs beyond the "green belt" envisaged by the planners of the 1950s resulted in community protests. In the early 1970s, trade unions and resident action groups imposed green bans on development projects in historic areas such as The Rocks. Federal, State and local governments subsequently introduced a range of heritage and environmental legislation. The Sydney Opera House was also controversial for its cost and disputes between architect Jorn Utzon and government officials. However, soon after it opened in 1973 it became a major tourist attraction and symbol of the city.

The progressive reduction in tariff protection from 1974 began the transformation of Sydney from a manufacturing centre focused on the domestic market to a "world city" providing financial, commercial, cultural and educational services to local residents and Australian and overseas markets. From the 1980s, overseas immigration to Sydney grew rapidly, with Asia, the Middle East and Africa becoming major sources of immigrants. By 2021, the population of Sydney was over 5.2 million, with 40% of the population born overseas. China and India overtook England as the largest source countries for overseas-born residents.

Darling Harbour and the city skyline, 1985

==== Culture and entertainment ====
Intellectuals such as those of the Sydney Push (including feminist Germaine Greer, author and broadcaster Clive James and art critic Robert Hughes) rose out of Sydney during the period, as did influential artists like painter Brett Whiteley. Paul Hogan went from painter on the Sydney Harbour Bridge to local TV star, then global film star with his hugely successful Crocodile Dundee in 1986 (a film which begins with scenes of Sydney) while theatre institutions like the Sydney Theatre Company and National Institute of Dramatic Art nurtured the budding careers of actors innumerable, some of whom forged their early careers in the city. In 1998, Fox Studios Australia opened as a major movie studio, occupying the site of the former Sydney Showground at Moore Park – going on to produce such commercially viable films as The Matrix films, Moulin Rouge!, Mission: Impossible 2 (set partly in Sydney), and the revived Star Wars and Superman film franchises. The traditional Sydney Royal Easter Show was relocated to the New Sydney Showground at Homebush.

=== Olympic City and the new millennium ===
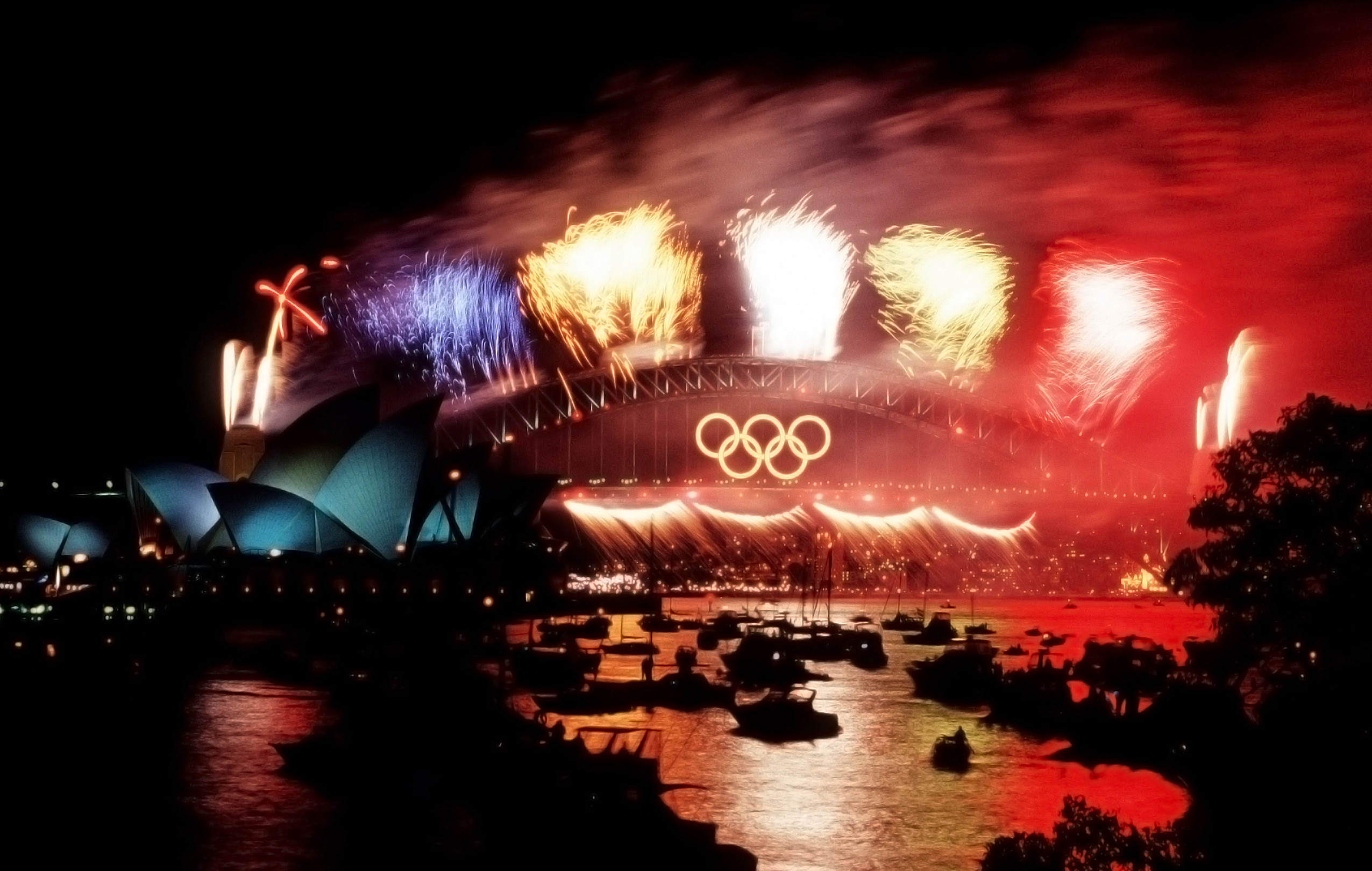
Olympic colours on the Sydney Harbour Bridge in the year 2000

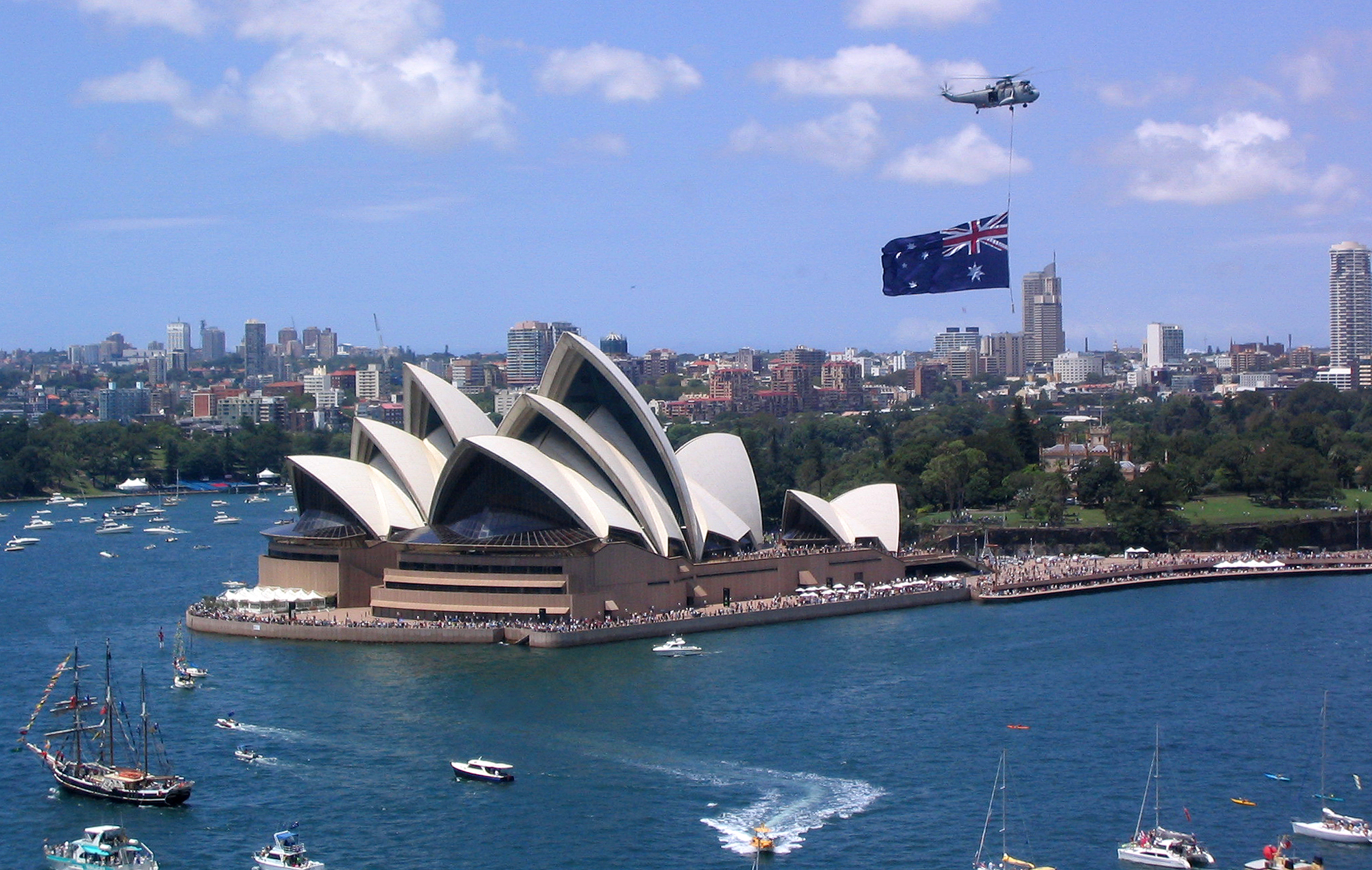
Australia Day, Sydney Harbour, 2004

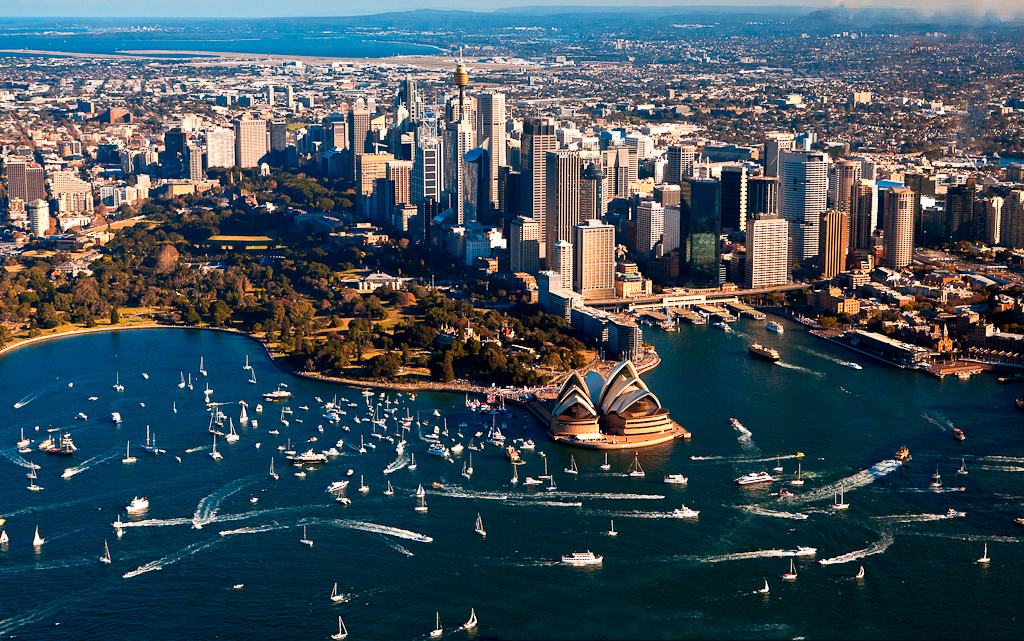
Sydney Harbour and the Sydney central business district in 2010

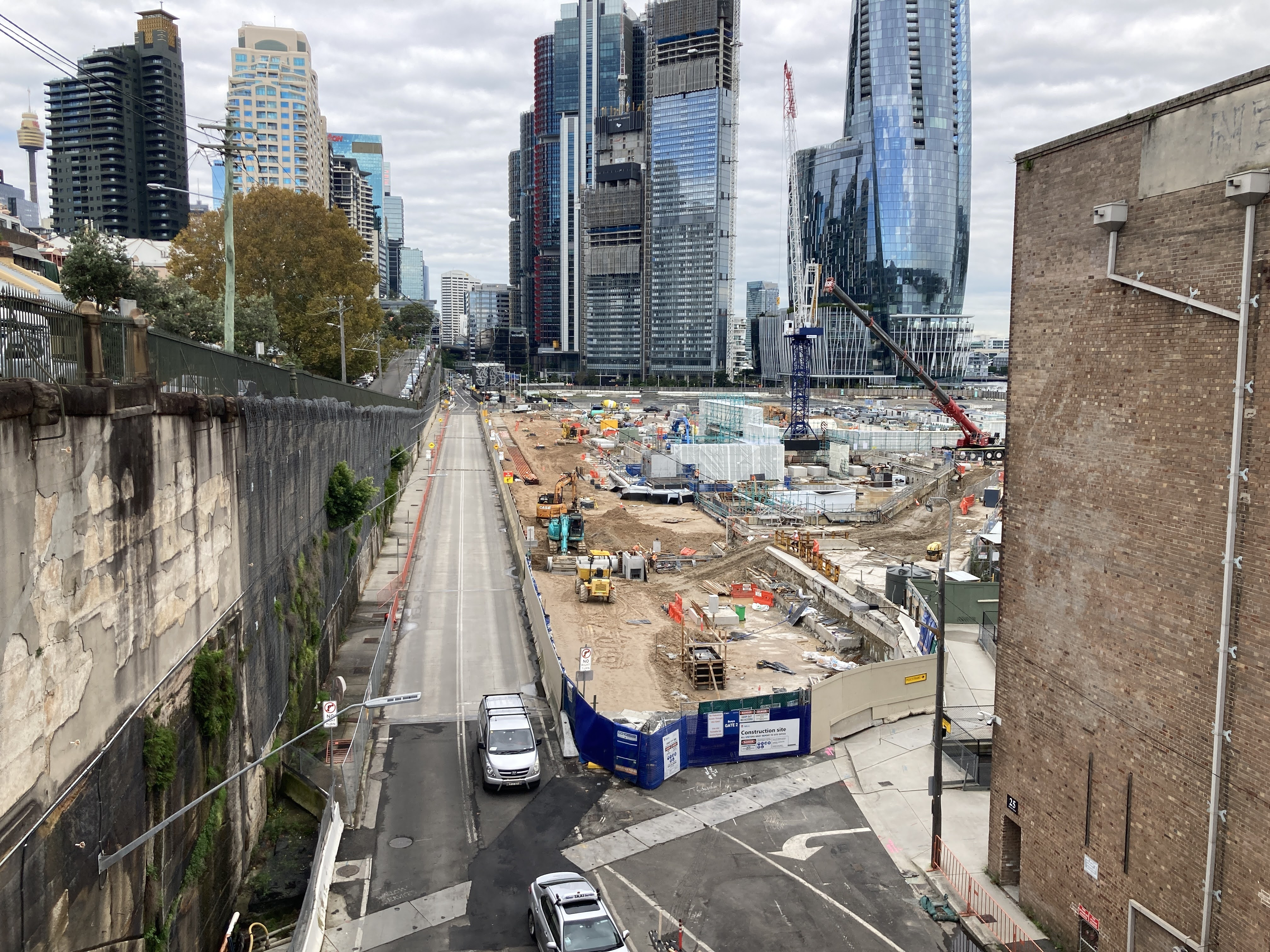
Construction of the Barangaroo railway station, which serves part of the rapid transit system Sydney Metro and opened in August 2024.

Stadium Australia (currently also known as ANZ Stadium due to naming rights), a multi-purpose stadium located in the Sydney Olympic Park precinct of the redeveloped Homebush Bay was completed in March 1999 at a cost of A$690 million to serve as a venue for the 2000 Summer Olympics. Sydney captured global attention in the Year 2000 by hosting the Summer Olympic Games. The Opening Ceremony of the Sydney Olympics featured a theatrical rendering of Australian history through dance and a torch lighting by Aboriginal athlete Cathy Freeman. At the Closing Ceremony, President of the International Olympic Committee, Juan Antonio Samaranch, declared:

"I am proud and happy to proclaim that you have presented to the world the best Olympic Games ever."

The Olympic mayor, Frank Sartor, was the Lord Mayor of Sydney, serving from 1991 to 2003 and his successor, Lucy Turnbull, became the first woman to hold that office in 2003. She was in turn succeeded by independent Clover Moore, Sydney's longest-serving mayor from 2004 – present. From 1991 to 2007, Sydneysiders governed as Prime Minister of Australia – first Paul Keating (1991–1996) and later John Howard (1996–2007), Tony Abbott (2013–2015), Malcolm Turnbull (2015–2018), Scott Morrison (2018–2022), and Anthony Albanese (2022–present). Sydney has maintained extensive political, economic and cultural influence over Australia as well as international renown in recent decades. Following the Olympics, the city hosted the 2003 Rugby World Cup, the APEC Leaders conference of 2007 and Catholic World Youth Day 2008, led by Pope Benedict XVI.

Sydney's population officially hit 5 million people at the 2016 census. The city has gained a reputation for diversity and is Australia's most multicultural city. In the 2011 census, 34 percent of the population reported having been born overseas. The city's first dedicated rapid transit system is currently under construction, with two lines open and two other lines announced. The project has been hailed as "transformative" by journalists. Australia's first rapid transit metro line, part of the Sydney Metro, linking the suburb of Epping to the north-west of Sydney, opened on 26 May 2019. It is a first in Australian transportation, as no other Australian city currently has an automated underground metro. The first line serves the north-western suburbs of the city, while the second line opened on 19 August 2024 and runs under Sydney Harbour from the southwest into the central business district. A third line, serving the western suburbs including Rozelle and Westmead, has been approved for construction.

== See also ==
- Aboriginal sites of New South Wales
- Culture of Sydney
- Climate history of Sydney
- History of Australia
- History of New South Wales
- Royal Australian Historical Society
- Rocks Push
- Sydney punchbowls
- Sydney Push
- Timeline of Sydney
