= Cumberland County Council =

Cumberland County Council may refer to:

- Cumberland County Council (New South Wales) (abolished in 1964)
- Cumberland County Council, England, the county council of Cumberland from 1889 to 1974
- Cumberland County Council BSA, Maine
- Cumberland County Council BSA, New Jersey
