= Northumberland County Council (New South Wales) =

Former county council in NSW, Australia

Agency overview
- Formed: 23 July 1948
- Dissolved: 1 June 1964
- Superseding agency: State Planning Authority

Northumberland County Council was a county council in the Australian state of New South Wales, responsible for regional planning, which existed from 1948 to 1964. It was modelled after the example of Cumberland County Council.

== History ==
Its member councils were the City of Greater Newcastle, the City of Maitland, the Municipality of Cessnock, the Shire of Kearsley, the Shire of Lake Macquarie, the Shire of Lower Hunter and the Shire of Port Stephens. Northumberland County Council should not be confused with the cadastral County of Northumberland, for which it was named; it was not a county government (no county in New South Wales has ever had a government); rather, it governed a legally distinct Northumberland county district, which did not include the entirety of the cadastral county: the Shire of Wyong and Shire of Gosford were not members of the county council and did not form part of its county district, despite being located within the county.

Northumberland County Council (and its associated county district) were dissolved on 1 June 1964 under the terms of Planning Authority Act 1963 (Act No.59, 1963), which merged its functions into the newly created State Planning Authority.
