= Mid-Western County Council =

Former county council in NSW, Australia

Agency overview
- Formed: 10 October 1947
- Dissolved: 26 November 2004
- Superseding agency: Mid-Western Regional Council

Mid-Western County Council was a county council in the Australian state of New South Wales, responsible for the management of noxious weeds. It proclaimed on 10 October 1947; at the time of its creation its member councils were Cudgegong Shire, Gulgong Shire, Rylstone Shire and Mudgee Municipality. In 1952, it was experiencing financial difficulty due to lack of funding. On 26 May 2004, its abolition was proclaimed effective 26 November 2004, with its assets and operations assumed by Mid-Western Regional Council.
