= Blayney (Abattoir) County Council =

Former county council in NSW, Australia

Agency overview
- Formed: 6 January 1956
- Dissolved: 21 September 1994

Blayney (Abattoir) County Council was a county council in the Australian state of New South Wales, responsible for operation of an abattoir in Blayney, New South Wales.

== History ==
Formally established on 6 January 1956, it commenced abattoir operations in 1957. In 1984, it was approved to export bovine meat to the European Economic Community. It was dissolved by proclamation of the governor of New South Wales, Peter Sinclair, dated 21 September 1994.
