= Castlereagh-Macquarie County Council =

County council in NSW, Australia

Agency overview
- Formed: 14 January 1947
- Website: https://cmcc.nsw.gov.au/

Castlereagh-Macquarie County Council is a county council in the Australian state of New South Wales, responsible for the management of noxious weeds. It proclaimed on 14 January 1947.
