= County council (New South Wales) =

Local government type in NSW, Australia

A county council in New South Wales, Australia, is a special purpose local government body to which a group of local government councils delegate the provision of certain services. Under the Local Government Act 1993, a county council can exist only for a specific purpose or purposes identified by the proclamation of the Governor which establishes it.

County councils were established under the Local Government Act 1919 (NSW). The first county council was St George County Council, formed on 4 December 1920. The area served by a county council is composed of the area of its member local government areas or parts thereof. The councillors of a county council are not directly elected by residents and property owners but are delegates of the member local governments.

County councils were once widespread. They formerly played a major role in electricity distribution, particularly in metropolitan areas but the electricity county councils were taken over by the NSW government which privatised and sold the businesses. By the 2020s, only nine county councils remained, all but one in regional areas.

County councils are not related to the 141 New South Wales land division counties for surveying and land title registration. Rous County Council is similarly named after Rous County and operates in a similar geographical area but the area it serves does not coincide with the county. Similarly, the area served by the former Cumberland County Council, a greater Sydney's urban planning county council that existed from the 1940s-1960s, was different from the County of Cumberland land division.

== County councils in New South Wales ==
Presently there are eight county councils in New South Wales:

- Castlereagh-Macquarie County Council
- Central Tablelands Water County Council
- Goldenfields Water County Council
- Hawkesbury River County Council (the only remaining county council in the Sydney metropolitan area)
- Riverina Water County Council
- Rous County Council
- Upper Hunter County Council, which has rebranded itself as the "Upper Hunter Weeds Authority", although Upper Hunter County Council remains its official name for legal purposes
- Upper Macquarie County Council, which has similarly rebranded itself as the "Central Tablelands Weeds Authority"

== Former county councils in New South Wales ==
In previous decades, county councils were much more numerous, with many having been disbanded or amalgamated. In particular, they used to play a major role in electricity distribution, with many acting as electricity supply utilities. Defunct county councils include:

- Bega Valley County Council
- Blayney (Abattoir) County Council
- Brisbane Water County Council
- Central Murray County Council
- Central Northern County Council
- Central West County Council
- Cudgegong (Abattoir) County Council
- Cumberland County Council
- Far North Coast County Council
- Far North Western Slopes County Council
- Gwydir Valley (Abattoir) County Council
- Illawarra County Council
- Lachlan Valley County Council
- Mackellar County Council
- Macquarie County Council
- Mid-Coast County Council
- Mid-Western County Council
- Monaro County Council
- Murray River County Council
- Murrumbidgee County Council
- Namoi Valley County Council
- New England (Abattoir) County Council
- New England County Council, branded as the "New England Weeds Authority", disbanded 2025
- New England County Council (the electricity county council, as opposed to the weeds county council)
- North West County Council
- Northern Riverina County Council
- Northern Rivers County Council
- Northumberland County Council
- Ophir County Council
- Oxley County Council
- Peel-Cunningham County Council
- Prospect County Council
- Richmond River County Council
- Shortland County Council
- South West Slopes County Council
- Southern Mitchell County Council
- Southern Riverina County Council
- Southern Slopes County Council
- Southern Tablelands County Council
- St George County Council
- Sydney County Council
- Tumut River County Council
- Ulan County Council
