= Cudgegong (Abattoir) County Council =

Former county council in NSW, Australia

Agency overview
- Dissolved: 2003

Cudgegong (Abattoir) County Council was a county council in the Australian state of New South Wales, responsible for the operation of an abattoir. Its constituent councils were Mudgee Shire and Rylstone Shire. It was dissolved in 2003 due to bankruptcy, with debts exceeding 8 million. Its dissolution required the passage of special legislation, the Local Government Amendment (Cudgegong (Abattoir) County Council Dissolution) Act 2003 No 56. In December 2003, the closed abattoir was purchased by a private firm which planned to reopen it. The closure of the abattoir resulted in several hundred job losses, which had a significant impact on the local council elections in the following year.

The Local Government Amendment (Cudgegong Abattoir) Act 1997 No 1 granted it the power to mortgage land it owned, a power which county councils in New South Wales normally do not possess.
