= Shortland County Council =

Former county council in NSW, Australia

Agency overview
- Formed: 1 September 1957
- Dissolved: 1 July 1993
- Superseding agency: Shortland Electricity

Shortland County Council was a county council in the Australian state of New South Wales, responsible for electricity distribution. It was abolished by the Electricity (Amendment) Act 1993, which transformed it from a local government agency controlled by its member LGAs to a state-owned corporation named Shortland Electricity.

== History ==
At the time of its founding in 1957, its member LGAs were the City of Newcastle, Municipality of Dungog, Gloucester Shire, Shire of Lake Macquarie, Port Stephens and Stroud and parts of Lower Hunter Shire and Wallarobba. Under the County Districts Reconstitution Act 1979, Hunter Valley County Council and Upper Hunter County Council were merged into Shortland County Council, effective 1 January 1980. Shortland County Council was named for Lieutenant John Shortland, the Royal Navy officer credited with being the first European to discover the area which is now Newcastle.
