= Rous County Council =

County council in NSW, Australia

Agency overview
- Formed: 1 July 2016
- Website: https://rous.nsw.gov.au/

Rous County Council is a county council in the Australian state of New South Wales. Despite sharing a name with Rous County, it is a distinct legal entity with a separate (albeit overlapping) territory, the Rous county district. In New South Wales, a county council is a special purpose local government which enables adjacent local government areas to collaborate in service provision; the territory of a county council is known as a "county district", and is usually identical to the territory of its member LGAs. Rous County Council's responsibilities are bulk water supply, flood mitigation and weed management. Rous County Council was established by proclamation on 1 July 2016, as the merger of three pre-existing county councils: Rous Water County Council, Far North Coast Weeds County Council and Richmond River County Council.

== Dunoon dam proposal ==
The council, which is the authority responsible for the water supply for most of the Ballina, Byron, Lismore and Richmond Valley council areas, published its draft water strategy in June 2020, which includes a 50-gigalitre (1.8×10^{9} cu ft) dam at Dunoon about 20 kilometres (12 mi) north of Lismore. The council has been aware of Indigenous concerns since the matter was first considered in the 1990s, and was committed to working with local communities to mitigate concerns. An impact assessment of the site had identified various artefacts and burial sites in the area.
