= Hawkesbury River County Council =

County council in NSW, Australia

Agency overview
- Formed: 15 September 1948
- Website: https://hrcc.nsw.gov.au/

Hawkesbury River County Council, trading as the Western Sydney Weeds Authority, is a county council in the Australian state of New South Wales. Established on 15 September 1948, its constituent LGAs are presently the City of Blacktown, City of Hawkesbury, City of Penrith and the Hills Shire. Its territory (county district) is composed of the entirety of its constituent LGAs. Its sole function is weed management under the Biosecurity Act 2015 (NSW) (previously the Noxious Weeds Act 1993).

On 14 August 2025, the Council resolved to adopt "Western Sydney Weeds Authority" (WSWA) as its name for operational and public purposes, while retaining the name of "Hawkesbury River County Council" (HRCC) for formal legal purposes.
