= Sydney Female Refuge Society =

Australian charity (1848-1925)

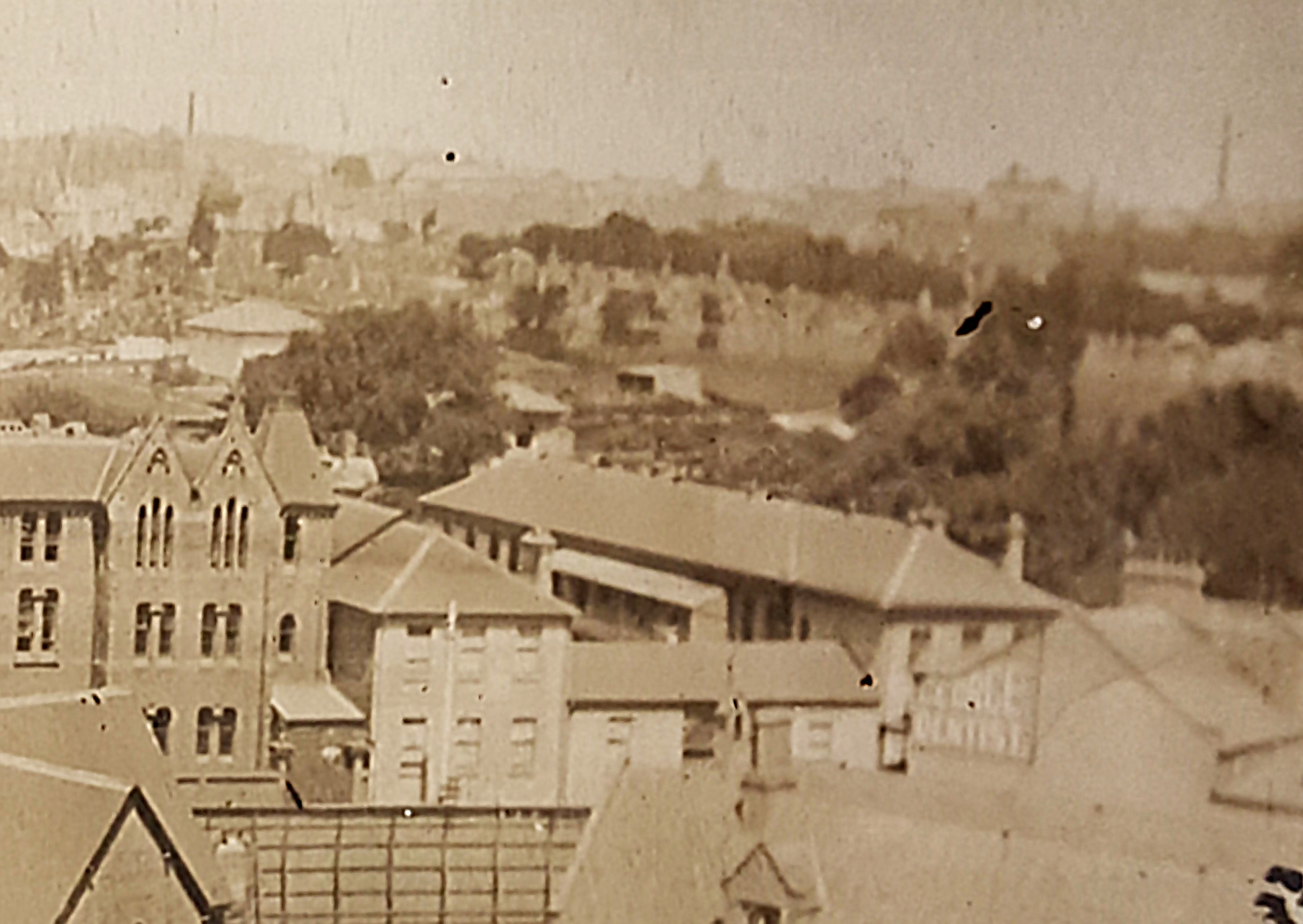
- Sydney Female Refuge Society, Pitt Street circa 1870
- Established: 21 August 1848
- Dissolved: 1925

For 77 years the Sydney Female Refuge Society provided a home for women escaping from prostitution and unmarried young girls who fell pregnant. The society operated from 1848 to 1925 and until 1901 was located in Pitt Street South.

== History ==
The refuge was established on 21 August 1848 by Sydney-siders concerned at the level of extra-marital pregnancies and prostitution. The Refuge Committee made it clear they felt Sydney was no worse than other cities but that it did have unique problems of its own.

The first of these was the legacy of young women sent out as convicts and separated from the guidance and support of their parents and families, leaving them susceptible to attack by unscrupulous men. A second problem was caused by the lack of water and sanitation in the city which encouraged disease and poor health.

The society had its origins with a member of the Sydney Mechanic’s Institute, Philip Clapman, who in June 1848 arranged a private meeting with New South Wales State Ministers. A provisional committee was set up supported by Edward Deas Thomson, Colonial Secretary, and Sir Alfred Stephen, the Chief Justice.

Among their first decisions was the stipulation the new institution should be non-denominational and should abide by a clear set of rules. The running of the Institution was conducted by the Ladies’ Committee and the Gentlemen’s Committee but the internal management of the Institute was the sole responsibility of the Ladies.

The refuge was first housed in the ‘Old House of Correction’ next to the Carter’s Barracks in Pitt Street. This building originally housed the treadmill (known locally as the ‘Climbing Sorrow’) where juvenile offenders, and some of maturer years, were corrected. Modifications were made to the buildings by Thomas Cowlshaw, a builder who lived in Hutchinson Street, Surry Hills. One of the first orders of business was the removal of the treadmill which was noted to have no place in the upcoming regime of female reform.

Entry to the refuge was either voluntary or made upon the recommendation of a magistrate, keeper of the gaol or a minister of religion. Once inside the inmates were expected to abide by the rules laid out and to stay for 1-2 years during which time they worked in the laundry or as seamstresses to earn money for the upkeep of the refuge. The rules also stipulated that they were not allowed to receive visits from anyone except those that have a legal right to see them, and these only on Tuesdays and Fridays, in the presence of the ‘Visiting Ladies’. These rules were at times hard to enforce as it was difficult to confirm exactly who the relatives were. On Tuesday 15 December 1864, Emily Brown was visited by “her brother” I told him he could not see her again without a letter from his father as matron has heard he was not her brother.

Although the institution claimed to only accept voluntary admissions it seems that in some cases parents placed their children there - with varying results. In December 1858 the society reported how,

Two young girls, aged respectively, fifteen and sixteen years, who were for some months inmates of the refuge, have since repeatedly called, and in the most feeling manner gratefully acknowledged their obligations to your committee, for the reception and treatment; their parents have also expressed their thankfulness for the beneficial change effected in their daughters.

By 1855 around 150 women had passed through the gates of the refuge and by 1858 the committee could claim that forty-six have obtained situations, fifteen have been married, and thirty-one restored to their friends. This suggests a high success rate but the number of escapes listed in the minute books suggests a much more complex environment. It also remains unclear whether the return of thirty-one inmates to their “friends” would mark a successful outcome in practice for these women. In 1860 Inspector Harrison stated that nearly a third of the prostitutes working in Sydney were under the age of sixteen and had been born in Australia.

In 1858 Charles Cowper's government undertook to reimburse the society for improvements they made to the site. The first new building was opened by Mrs Young, 3 October 1860, but requests for improvements to the buildings were a constant feature in the annual reports over this period. In 1869 the committee described the accommodation as being, by no means satisfactory, and the addition of another range of buildings is absolutely necessary; the old and unsightly one now standing, and to which reference was made two years ago, being in a most dilapidated condition. It has been repaired from time to time but the expenditure seems almost useless.

In 1870 a new building was approved and plans submitted by George Allen Mansfield the architect. This year also saw Mrs Wait, the Matron, retire and she was replaced by Mrs Malbon. The new building was completed in 1871.

Around 1901 the buildings on Pitt Street were demolished to make way for the Central railway station and the society purchased in 1903 a new property "Rosebank' in Glebe Point Road, Glebe. On 31 March 1925, the refuge was voluntarily wound up and Mr Harmsworth Way and the process started to move the assets to the Church of England Homes in Glebe Point.

== Citations ==
This article incorporates text made available under the CC BY 4.0 license.
