= Cumberland County Council (New South Wales) =

Former county council in NSW, Australia

Cumberland County Council was a county council which existed in the Australian state of New South Wales from 1945 to 1964. Despite being named for Cumberland County, it was legally distinct from it, covering a largely identical but technically distinct territory (the Cumberland county district).

== Origin ==
The Local Government Act 1919, part 29, enabled the governor to proclaim "county councils", which are groupings of local government areas (at the time, municipalities and shires) who wished to cooperate in the provision of services. The territory of a county council is known as a "county district". Although the State of New South Wales is divided up into 141 counties, for the purposes of surveying and the registration of land titles, counties and county districts are distinct legal entities, generally with different names and territories.

Under the act, a Cumberland County Council existed from 27 July 1945 to 1964. Despite sharing the name of Cumberland County, it was not the government of Cumberland County, rather of the Cumberland county district, which was a legally distinct entity despite covering the same geographic area. While like other county councils in New South Wales, it was established by proclamation of the governor, the Local Government (Town and Country Planning) Amendment Act 1945 inserted a new part 12A in the Local Government Act 1919, containing special legislative provisions to apply to Cumberland County Council. Under part 12A, a shire or municipality could be proclaimed by the Governor to be part of Cumberland county district only if at least some of its territory was located in Cumberland County; the Cumberland county district would only include the parts of the shire lying within Cumberland County.

== Overview ==
Its responsibilities were primarily limited to town planning on the metropolitan scale. As is the case of all other county councils in New South Wales, Cumberland County Council was not elected by the people, but rather was elected by councillors of the various local governments within the county. The council consisted of 10 councillors each elected to a single constituency: No. 1 (Sydney), No. 2 (Marrickville, Canterbury), No. 3 (Randwick, Botany, Woollahra, Waverley), No. 4 (Rockdale, Hurstville, Kogarah, Sutherland), No. 5 (Strathfield, Ashfield, Burwood, Leichhardt, Drummoyne, Concord), No. 6 (Auburn, Bankstown, Holroyd, Parramatta), No. 7 (Mosman, Manly, North Sydney, Warringah), No. 8 (Hunter's Hill, Hornsby, Ku-ring-gai, Lane Cove, Ryde), No. 9 (Blacktown, Penrith, Baulkham Hills, Windsor) and No. 10 (Fairfield, Camden, Liverpool, Campbelltown, and parts of Wollondilly and Wollongong).

In 1948 the Council published the County of Cumberland planning scheme, a framework for accommodating expected postwar growth in the Sydney Basin. The objectives of the County Council were often in conflict with the aims of many State Government departments. For instance, the County Council's plans called for a green belt to encircle metropolitan Sydney, while the NSW Housing Commission wished to use much of this land to build new low-density public housing estates in areas such as Blacktown and Liverpool. As a result, the Cumberland County Council was dissolved in 1964.

On 4 July 1963, the Cumberland County Council adopted a report by chief planner Rod Fraser and opposed the expressway recommendations of the 1961 De Leuw Cather (DLC) Geometric Design Study, which was commissioned by and reproduced the complete system of future expressways "as first proposed by the Department of Main Roads in 1948". On 5 July 1963, The Minister for Highways Pat Hills called on the Cumberland County Council to make constructive criticisms of the newly proposed expressway. Rod Fraser published a 23 page report in 1964 critiquing the 1961 plan. However, while he was in the process of forming the State Planning Authority (one purpose of which was to absorb the CCC), Pat Hills reportedly instructed Mr. Ashton to ensure Rod Fraser's report was "pulped", as it was "political dynamite".

Its metropolitan planning functions were taken over by a new body, the State Planning Authority, which has since been superseded by a succession of state government planning departments. As of 2024, the planning department is the Department of Planning, Housing and Infrastructure.

== County of Cumberland Planning Scheme (1951) ==
The County of Cumberland Planning Scheme was perhaps the first attempt at a complete town plan for Sydney.

The County Roads in the County of Cumberland Planning Scheme were the "Council's greatest administrative problem ever since the Scheme took effect in 1951."

== History ==
=== 1957 Study Tour ===
In 1957, the Chief County Planner for the Council, R.D.L. Fraser and his Deputy Council Clerk (Mr. F.D. Bolin) undertook a study tour of planning in the United States, part of Canada, and most of the countries in Europe "where planning is being carried out" including the United Kingdom.

The author declared "What a city needs more than anything to give it life and lustre is people". and "I feel certain that the solution to the problem of access does not lie solely in the provision of expressways and parking space for more and more more motor vehicles to enter the City."

The summary of the tour stated the major weakness of the County Scheme was the County Roads component. Fraser was "more strongly of the opinion" that a review of the County Roads in the scheme was a necessity after his trip, though also recommended a review beforehand.

The 1958 tour report stated that as construction of inner city ring roads in Birmingham and Coventry were being coordinated with slum clearance, the "problem of the effect of the roads on property is not so great". It theorised either the motor age hadn't been properly felt in Britain or "the conservative British mind refuses to be stamped into precipitate action to grapple with the problem".

The report noted congestion was already occurring on expressways in North America. The author observed it seemed likely conditions would worsen at a rate faster than the provision of expressways, and asked "What them is the aim of the road planner?". Road engineers that Fraser met overseas admitted it would be "quite impossible to provide a road system which would accommodate the maximum use of motor vehicles."

In comparing "slums" of overseas cities to Sydney's "slums", the report claimed there is nothing to commend Sydney's "slums", however "It would be difficult to find anywhere in the world residential sites so close to the city and so well endowed physically as Paddington, the Glebe and North Sydney."

The author suggested rather than focusing on "whether redevelopment of the inner residential areas is necessary in order to provide better housing", the question is whether the low population density of inner residential areas was "highway wasteful" due to proximity to the city. The 1958 report identified there may be a renewal of interest in the inner residential areas and it was "conceivable that many people might rebel against having to live in the extreme outposts of the metropolis in the belief that such loss of contact is too great a sacrifice".

The New York City Planning Commission was visited during the tour (when Robert Moses was commissioner) though there are scant mentions of New York City ( except in the context of slum clearance). It described a large New York City Planning Commission scheme 'rehabilitating' three and four-story buildings (and some tall apartment buildings) near Central Park in it formative stages and expected a report available in 1958. It described federal assistance as a "great boost to slum clearance in the United States" and that work was generally "being done by local housing or redevelopment agencies allied in some way in the complicated local government structure with the City Councils".

=== 1964 report "pulping" ===
Rod Fraser, Chief County Planner of the Cumberland County Council), wrote a 1964 report criticising the 1961 De Leuw Cather (DLC) Geometric Design Study report. The 1961 report proposed a large number of new expressways, and presented detailed designs for the Ultimo Interchange.

Most copies of the 1964 report were "mysteriously destroyed". Nigel Ashton, reportedly acting on Pat Hills' instructions, ordered Mr. Fraser's report to be "pulped". The report was described as "political dynamite". Pat Hills said he had not ordered the "pulping" of the report. Pat Morton, the Minister for Local Government and Highways, said he had not heard of Rod Fraser's report and would make inquiries.

Rod Fraser stated the DLC proposals failed to consider Sydney's land-use, omitted that Sydney's transport system was no longer predominantly radial, and gave a misleading economic benefit estimate from the expressway system.

The 1966 "Civic Roundsman" author in the Daily Telegraph wrote they had "one of the few, if not the only" copy of the printed report. As of May 2026, the report has not been found by staff at the State Library of New South Wales, City of Sydney Archives, Museums of History NSW state archives or by Transport for NSW.

== See also ==
- Transport in Sydney#History
- Urban planning of Sydney

== Chairmen ==
Years	Name	Council	Notes
1945–1951	John Percival Tate	Ryde	
1951–1958	Ronald Stark Luke	Mosman	
1958–1960	Leslie Arthur Scutts	Marrickville	
1960–1961	Sydney John Webb	Holroyd	
1961–1962	Tom Foster	Sydney	
1962–1963	Sydney John Webb	Holroyd	
1963–1964	Samuel Peters	Randwick	
