= Urban planning of Sydney =

The urban planning of Sydney, Australia has been done formally and informally since at least the city's establishment in 1788. The city has been characterised as an 'accidental city', with planning advocate JD Fitzgerald claiming that it was "a city without a plan, save whatever planning was due to the errant goat".

Planned and organic urban renewal in Sydney frequently occurs, with the redevelopment of housing and neighbourhoods.

== History ==
=== Early colonial planning ===
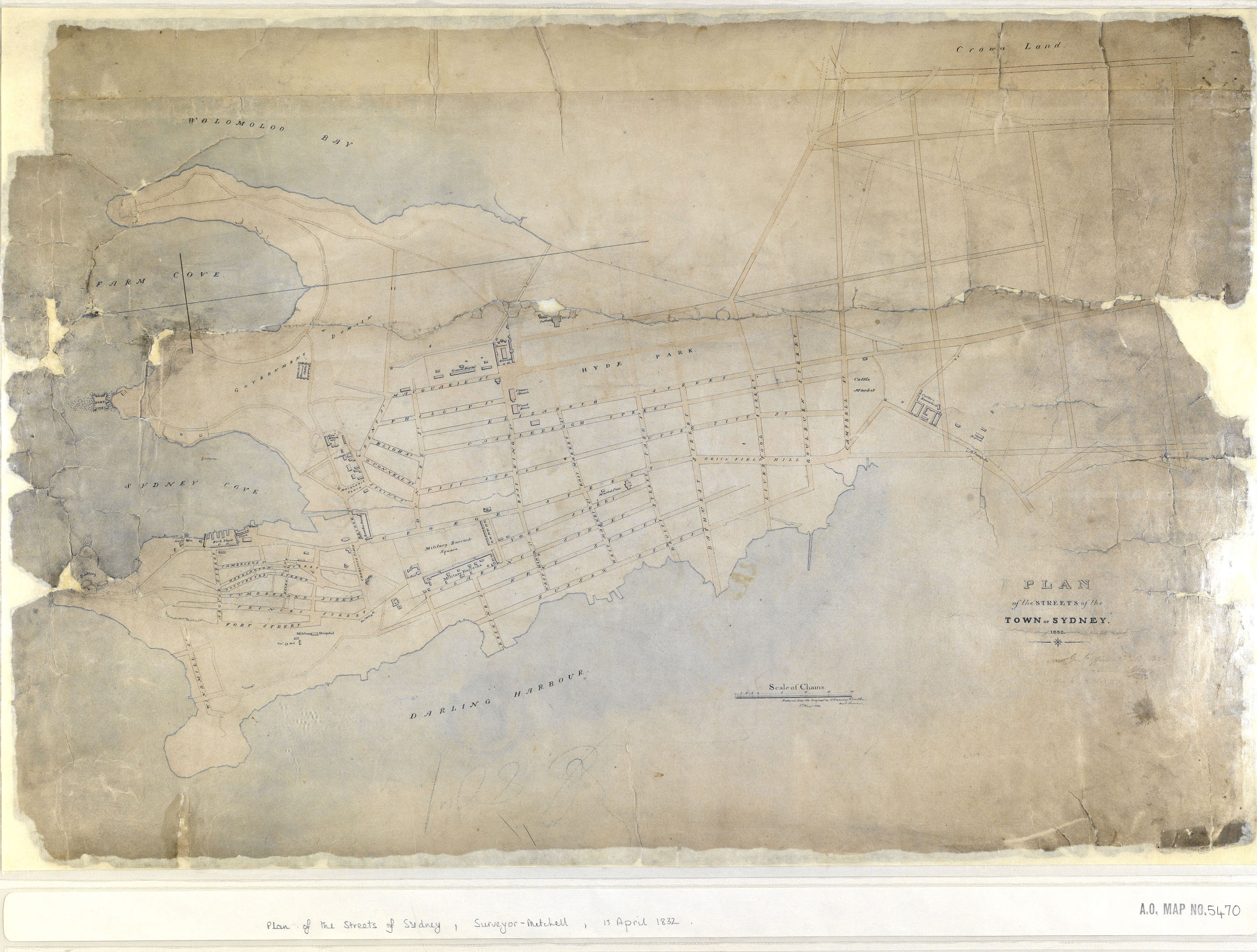
Sydney streets in 1832.

The founder of Sydney, Governor Arthur Phillip, planned from the beginning for the penal colony to eventually become a town, writing that the settlement (which he wanted to name 'Albion') should have uniform building style, streets that were 200 feet wide, as well as building allotments of 60 by 150 feet. However, no architects, town planners, or surveyors came with the First Fleet, with engineers Augustus Alt and William Dawes left to the task of following Phillip's intentions, and consequently drew up a plan for a grid pattern with a town centre on the western hills above where the Tank Stream ran into the Sydney Cove. The contemporary Lang Street was meant to be the High Street, and was meant to be a grand avenue with views across to Bennelong Point. However, most of the plan never came to fruition. Instead, the early road network was at least in part based on Indigenous walking paths, which themselves followed natural contours such as ridgelines or the Tank Stream. However, their plan for Parramatta was realised, following a grid and with a 62 metre wide high street (now known as George Street).

Governor Lachlan Macquarie and the New South Wales Government Architect, Francis Greenway, made major contributions to the planning and design of early colonial Sydney. This included 265 public works, such as Parramatta Road and Old South Head Road. Greenway had also proposed making a complete plan for the town, with a grand square, major public buildings, as well as a bridge across the harbour at Dawes Point. Despite such early planning, many of the houses in the convict settlement were built erratically, with an 1832 Report on the Limits of Sydney by Surveyor General Thomas Mitchell noting that peripheral land of the settlement had "been alienated and that roads and boundary lines were oblique and irregular", which he tried in vain to regularize. The first limits on building development were however passed with the Police Act of 1833, as well as the Street Alignments Act of 1834 and the Building Act of 1837, based on the London Building Act 1774 (14 Geo. 3. c. 78 (Imp)). The incorporation of the City of Sydney in 1842 created local government ostensibly able to manage growth. However, its ability to govern was hampered by powerful local interests, and the city had severe problems by the 1870s.

=== Late 1800s ===
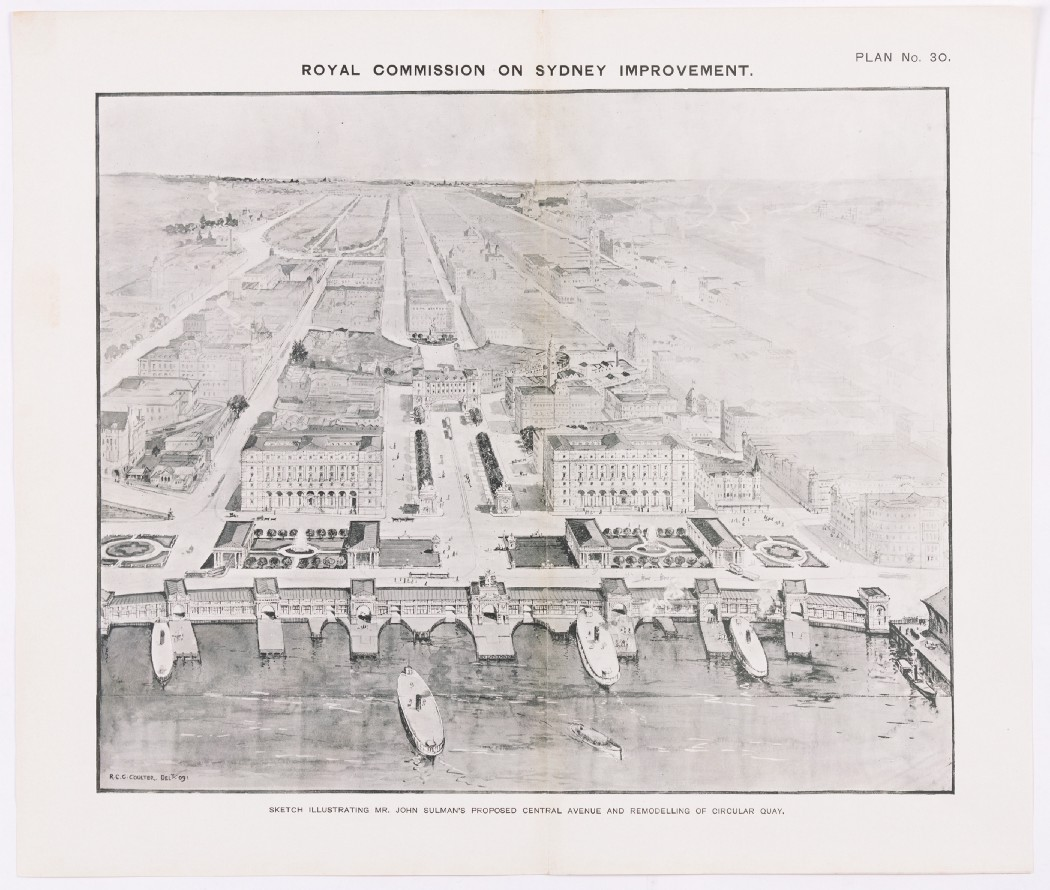
John Sulman's proposal for Circular Quay made for the 1909 Royal Commission.

In the 19th century, the sanitary movement agitated for urban improvement for better public health. Following the outbreaks of disease and accumulation of unsanitary buildings, the City of Sydney Improvement Act was passed in 1879. This was followed by the Land for Public Purposes Acquisition Act in 1880, allowing the creation of parklands. Parks from this era include Redfern Park and Belmore Park. A minimum width for streets of 20.1 metres was set in 1881.

By the 1890s the ideas of laissez-faire liberalism were dominant.

=== 1900s ===
In 1900, an outbreak of bubonic plague took place in the city. Inspired by British royal commissions into improving urban conditions, such as the Poor Law Commission, the 1909 Royal Commission for the Improvement of the City of Sydney and Its Suburbs was established for a similar purpose. The commission recommended building underground railways in the city centre and electrifying the suburban lines. A new Building Act to regulate urban design was also suggested, as well as the demolishing of Darlinghurst Gaol for a park or a monumental building.

A key figure in the beginning of formal planning in Sydney was John Sulman. His 1890 lecture 'The laying out of towns' (later published in the Brisbane Courier) marked the beginning of town planning in Australia. He advocated for garden suburbs and open space for the next 40 years. He had begun advocating for planning in The Daily Telegraph in 1907, and gave testimony to the 1909 Royal Commission. Instead of a grid plan (such as the Hoddle Grid in Melbourne), he advocated for a 'spider's web' network of roads. Sulman published Plan no 2, which depicted new streets at diagonals through Chippendale, Surry Hills and other suburbs. Other ideas of his included the extension of Martin Place and the widening of various streets. He also taught urban planning at the University of Sydney.

A vast number of maps were published in the Report of the Royal Commission for the improvement of the City of Sydney & its suburbs.

=== 1910s ===
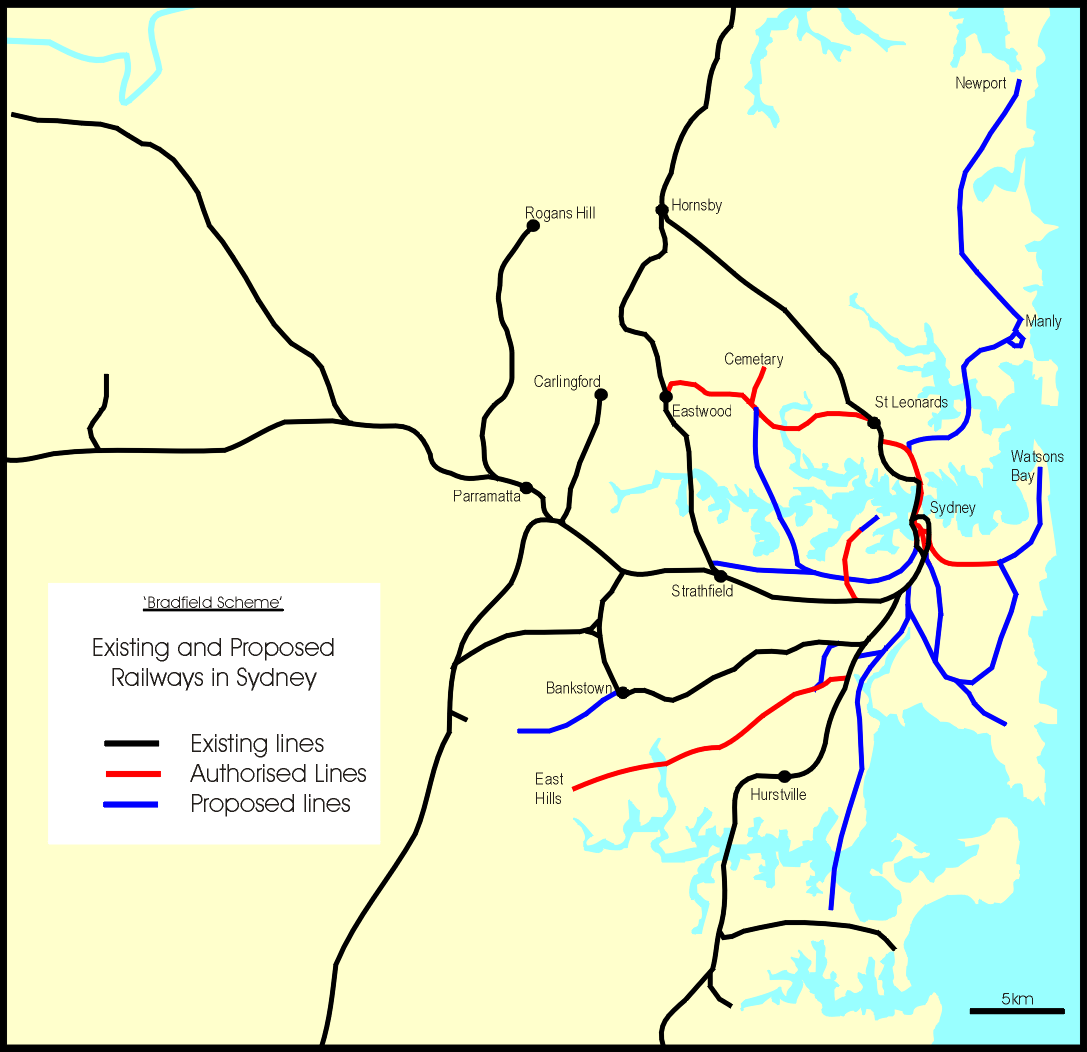
Bradfield's proposed railways in Sydney.

The City Beautiful movement became buzz words in Sydney planning circles in the early 20th century. Another influence was the garden city movement, of which Daceyville (built 1912) was a model suburb. The husband-wife team of Walter Burley and Marion Mahony Griffin, who had planned Canberra with influence from both movements, also designed the suburb of Castlecrag. At the time, Castlecrag was noted as an experiment in communal and community planning and living.

=== 1920s ===
In the 1920s, government engineer John Bradfield proposed a railway scheme to improve transportation in the city, which included an underground rail loop under the CBD (later constructed as the City Circle) and a harbour crossing (which he built as the Sydney Harbour Bridge).

Unrealised parts of the vision included three new inner-city rail lines, with a loop through the Eastern Suburbs (later built in a truncated form as the Eastern Suburbs railway line), a line to the west from Petersham through Annandale, Leichhardt, Rozelle and Balmain to the CBD, as well as a line over the bridge to the Northern Beaches (for which extra tracks were built on the bridge, used by trams until 1958 before conversion to traffic lanes).

=== 1940s - 1960s ===
In 1948, the County of Cumberland planning scheme was published. Drawing partial inspiration from the 1944 Greater London Plan, it introduced zoning, employment zones, open space acquisitions, and a green belt. The green belt was contentious, and in many ways the plan did not succeed.

When the scheme was made, the accepted view was that much of Inner Sydney was slums and should be rebuilt. The Landlord and Tenant Act influenced many owners of large numbers of poor-condition homes to sell them to their tenants, making large-scale acquisition politically and financially difficult.

In the 1957 the 45.7 metre height limit was lifted. In the 1950s, planning branches in local councils were rare.

Construction of Sydney's first skyscraper, the AMP Building, was completed in 1962.

=== 1970s ===
In the 1970s, local planning and environmental issues were receiving increased attention in local governments and within the community.

The Sydney Cove Redevelopment Authority was set up in 1970 to oversee urban renewal in the inner-city. Its plans for a redevelopment of the historic Rocks precinct into high-rise towers was however blocked by the so-called green bans, which enforced strikes on various controversial redevelopment projects throughout Sydney. This led to changes in the New South Wales planning system, with the introduction of environmental and heritage conservation legislation.

The 1971 City of Sydney Strategic Plan was a significant plan, representing Australia’s first comprehensive attempt to plan a city centre. The floor space code was an Australian-American hybrid similar to a discretionary British style planning system, but calibrated close to the levels in dense American CBDs. The plan introduced the concept of character areas and called for preventing development of office buildings into inner residential areas of the City.

In 1974, the NSW Government published Towards a New Planning System for New South Wales. In 1975 the Minister for Planning and Environment published the Proposals for a New Environmental Planning System for New South Wales.

The Environmental Planning and Assessment Act 1979 was the resultant legislation, along with the formation of the Land and Environment Court of New South Wales.

=== 1980s and 1990s ===
As the city faced a scarcity of land in the 1980s following urban sprawl, urban consolidation became the new target of planning. The new regional plan, Sydney Into Its Third Century, aimed to increase urban density.

In 1998, the NSW state government launched Action for Transport 2010. Very little of substance, apart from the proposed roads, was implemented. A number of documents and media releases of the project were archived.

=== 2010s ===
In May 2012, the NSW government published the Sydney over the next 20 years discussion paper. Drawing on the objectives set out in NSW 2021: A plan to make NSW number one, this plan made the case for a metropolitan strategy.

== Urban planning in the 2020s ==
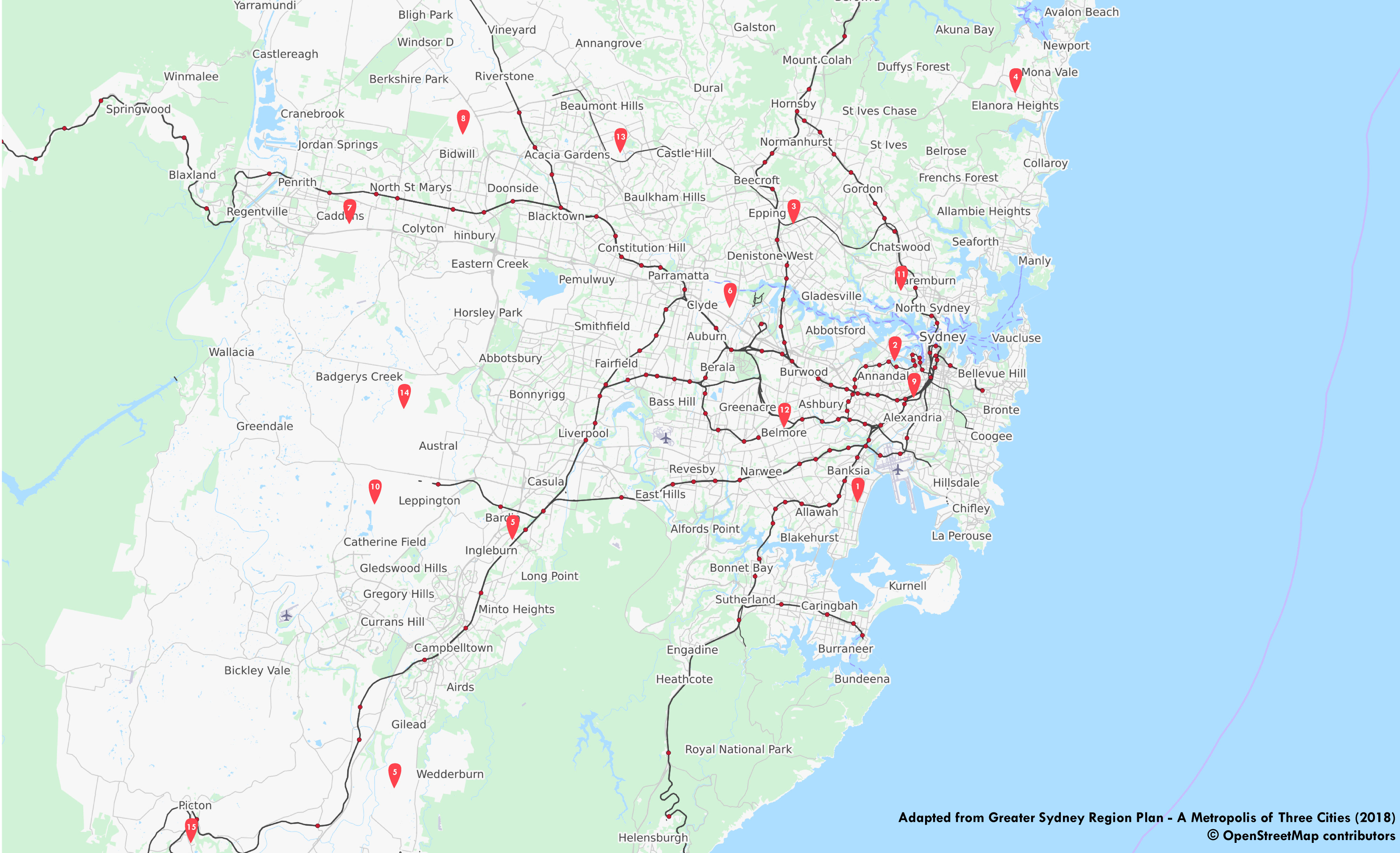
Growth areas and urban renewal corridors identified in the Greater Region Sydney Plan

=== Greater Sydney Commission ===
Under minister for planning, Pru Goward, the Greater Sydney Commission was announced in parallel with A Plan for Growing Sydney in December 2014 and formally empowered with the passing of the Greater Sydney Commission Act 2015 under minister for planning Rob Stokes.

==== A Metropolis of Three Cities ====
In March 2018, the Greater Sydney Commission published The Greater Sydney Region Plan - A Metropolis of Three Cities plan. This proposed the integration of land use and transport planning and aimed to boost liveability, productivity and sustainability of Sydney.

The plan dubbed three regions the "metropolis of three cities" as the Greater Sydney Commission subdivisions, namely:

- Central River City - around Central Sydney
- Eastern Harbour City - around Parramatta
- Western Sydney Parkland City - between Penrith and Liverpool

It alternatively divides the metropolis into five more precisely defined districts, with a "district plan" formulated for each district:

- Central City District: including the northwestern local government areas of Blacktown, Cumberland, Parramatta and The Hills Shire.
- Eastern City District: including the eastern, central and inner western local government areas of Bayside, Burwood, Canada Bay, City of Sydney, Inner West, Randwick, Strathfield, Waverley and Woollahra.
- North District: including the northeastern local government areas of Hornsby, Hunters Hill, Ku-ring-gai, Lane Cove, Mosman, North Sydney, Northern Beaches, Ryde and Willoughby
- South District: including the southern local government areas of Canterbury-Bankstown, Georges River and Sutherland
- Western City District: including the western local government areas of Blue Mountains, Camden, Campbelltown, Fairfield, Hawkesbury, Liverpool, Penrith and Wollondilly.

Local government authorities were required to align their planning instruments to the priorities listed in the Metropolis of Three Cities (Regional Plan) and the relevant District Plan.

Urban renewal corridors across Greater Sydney were identified in the plan. According to population forecasts, it was anticipated that revitalisation in these areas would enable capacity for new housing aligned with sufficient infrastructure to help supply an additional 725,000 homes.

Growth areas and urban renewal corridors (see map)
| 1. Bayside West Precinct | 6. Greater Parramatta Growth Area | 11. St Leonards & Crows Nest |
| 2. The Bays Precinct | 7. Greater Penrith to Eastern Creek Growth Area | 12. Sydenham to Bankstown |
| 3. Epping and Macquarie Park Urban Renewal | 8. North West Growth Area | 13. Sydney Metro North West |
| 4. Ingleside Growth Area | 9. Redfern to Eveleigh | 14. Western Sydney Airport |
| 5. Greater Macarthur Growth Area | 10. South West Growth Area | 15. Wilton Growth Area |

In June 2023, the newly elected Minns government announced that the staff of the Greater Cities Commission would be folded back into the Department of Planning and Environment.

In February 2025, the Minns government tabled a bill in NSW parliament to amend the Environmental Planning and Assessment Act 1979 to remove all references to the Six Cities Region plan.

In August 2026, The Sydney Plan replaced the Greater Sydney Region Plan: A Metropolis of Three Cities and 5 district plans.

== The Sydney Plan (2026) ==
In August 2026 The Sydney Plan was published.

== Topics and themes ==
=== Metropolitan planning ===
While the Local Government Act of 1919 had given councils more power over development, metropolitan growth was left to the market. Despite lobbying in the 1920s, no metropolitan planning authority was put in place and planning in effect meant local government micromanagement. A greater city movement failed as it threatened local vested interests.

In 1945 the City of Sydney was expanded to include eight surrounding suburbs, while a new regional level of government was established with the Cumberland County Council. This allowed for the creation of the 1948 County of Cumberland planning scheme, which has been called "the most definitive expression of a public policy on the form and content of an Australian metropolitan area ever attempted". Drawing partial inspiration from the 1944 Greater London Plan, it introduced zoning, employment zones, open space acquisitions, and a green belt. However, especially the last part proved contentious and the plan in many ways did not succeed.

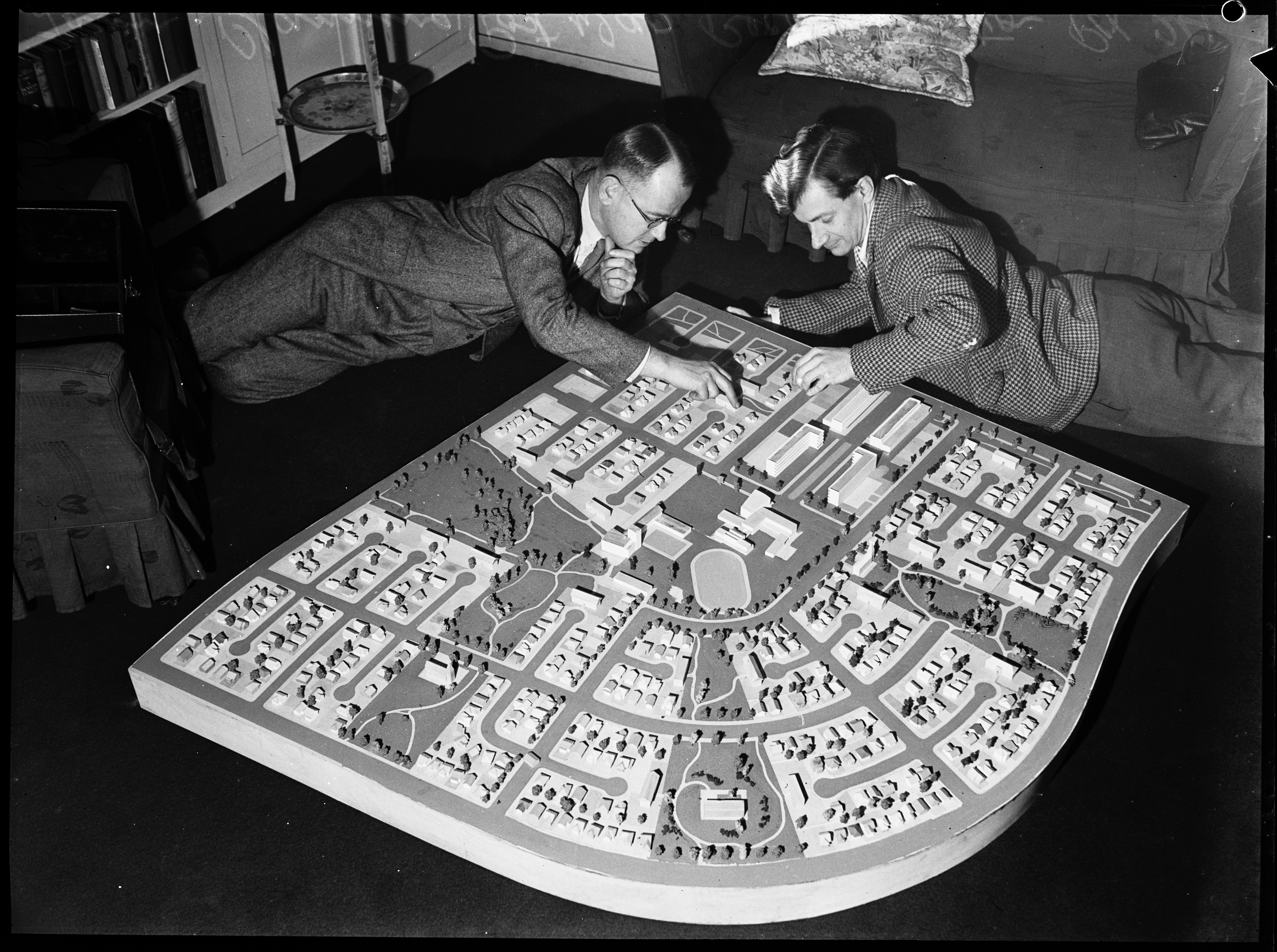
Town planning, Department of Postwar Reconstruction, Sydney, 1944

The County Council was superseded in 1964 by the State Planning Authority, which prepared the 1968 Sydney Region Outline Plan. This plan aimed to decentralize the city by building along rail corridors and developing new town centres. The green belt meanwhile became the Western Sydney Parklands.

=== Public housing in Sydney ===
Derogatory labels for Western Sydney residents was influenced by social problems and aesthetics of large-scale public housing estates. In the 1950s such estates were developed in Seven Hills, in the 1960s in Green Valley and Mount Druitt, and in the 1970s the Radburn-style estates of Bonnyrigg, Villawood, Claymore, Minto, Airds and Macquarie Fields. The Greater Western Sydney area became home to families resettled from the inner-city 'slums' to new suburbs, as well as lower income migrants.

== See also ==
- Urban planning in Australia
- Urban renewal in Sydney
- Housing Delivery Authority
- Housing affordability in Australia
- History of Sydney#Transport
- Department of Main Roads
- Cumberland County Council
