= Western Sydney Leadership Dialogue =

Australian non-profit organization

Western Sydney Leadership Dialogue is a not-for-profit organisation based in Sydney, Australia. It advocates the needs of the Western Sydney region by facilitating communication between Sydney's key opinion leaders in education, government and the wider community. The Dialogue works closely with organisations including the Western Sydney Business Chamber, Western Sydney Community Forum, Western Sydney University (WSU) and various state and local government groups.

== Background ==
The Western Sydney Leadership Dialogue was founded by Christopher Brown, AM, and launched in 2015 by Mike Baird, who was the New South Wales premier at the time. Since then, the Regional Advocacy has focused on creating discussion between key stakeholders about current issues affecting Sydney's west. The Dialogue has worked closely with government and has released various reports on key issues with a view to facilitating political, academic and cultural discussion.

== Patrons ==
Christopher Brown AM (member of the WSU Board of Trustees) is both founder and chairman of the Western Sydney Leadership Dialogue. Adam Leto is the executive director.

Current patrons include:

- Lucy Hughes Turnbull AO
- Mr Cameron Clyne
- Mike Mrdak AO
- Dr Kerry Schott AO
- Professor Peter Shergold AC (UWS Chancellor)

Founding patrons at the Dialogue include former NSW Premier Hon. Nick Greiner and Craig Knowles AM.

== Initiatives ==
In March 2016, the Dialogue held its first conference, named the Out There Summit. The goal was to share a new vision for Western Sydney, which included discussion about transport initiatives, the western Sydney airport and urban renewal. Speakers included Malcolm Turnbull (prime minister at the time), Mike Baird (NSW premier at the time) and Lucy Turnbull (chief of the Greater Sydney Commission).

This was followed by Boomtown! Summit in November 2016. The conference was held to showcase future projects for the Western Sydney region. WSLD partnered with Transport for NSW to host the conference and outlined plans for the Sydney Metro West, Parramatta Light Rail and Western Sydney Airport projects.

In 2017, the Western Sydney Leadership Dialogue pushed for Sydney's West to hold the 2030 Commonwealth Games. According to Chairman Christopher Brown, western Sydney would have benefited from hosting the games, as it would create a deadline for major transport projects in Western Sydney to be completed.

In March 2019, the Dialogue released a report on domestic abuse in Western Sydney. The report makes recommendations to tackle the high rate of domestic abuse in the region, including paid domestic violence leave and a royal commission.

In May 2019, the not-for-profit released a report titled Western Sydney's Heavy Issue with a view to facilitating political discussion on tackling obesity in western Sydney. The report advocates a 5-point plan that focuses on prevention with a view to decreasing pressure on Western Sydney's healthcare system.

In July 2019, the Regional Advocacy released a guide titled Best of the West. It provides readers with a snapshot of regional events, popular places, infrastructure and innovations in Western Sydney.

In August 2019, the Dialogue released a report titled Stuck in the Middle. The report focuses on a structural overhaul of the central Sydney region with an aim to improve infrastructure and stimulate growth. Key recommendations include the negotiation of a new City Deal and appointment of a Central City Coordinator General. The not-for-profit supports the Greater Sydney Commission's vision of the Sydney Metropolis and has recommended action to improve the central Sydney region to ensure it competes well with the East and West.

In September 2019, delegates from the Western Sydney Leadership Dialogue completed a 4-day East London Study Tour. The goal of the tour was to hear about London's regeneration efforts after the 2012 Summer Olympics. The visit included a discussion about social housing provision and the benefit of developers and councils working together to meet community needs.

== Advocacy ==
Since its launch, the Western Sydney Leadership Dialogue has focused its lobbying efforts on a range of projects, including the north–south rail, SBS relocation, value capture, social issues and local government reform, for Western Sydney.

=== North–south rail ===
In 2016, the Dialogue joined Western Sydney councils and major landowners to establish the Western Sydney Rail Alliance to lobby for a north–south rail connection in Western Sydney. The proposed rail connection would connect to the new Badgerys Creek Airport. According to the report A network of opportunity–Western Sydney Rail by Deloitte and Arup, a north–south rail connection would boost employment hubs in Western Sydney and promote economic growth. In 2018, government approved $7bn in funding for a new rail connection from St Marys to Badgerys Creek Airport.

=== SBS relocation ===
The Western Sydney Leadership Dialogue advocated the push for SBS headquarters to relocate to Western Sydney. The lobby group pushed for Western Sydney councils to suggest potential headquarters and propose a deal.

=== Social issues ===
The Dialogue advocates on social issues, such as obesity, diabetes, homelessness and domestic violence.

=== Value capture ===
The Regional Advocacy supports the idea of private sector contributions to the cost of public infrastructure through value capture. According to the Dialogue, federal funding, value capture, privatisation and borrowing are all needed to successfully transform Western Sydney.

=== Local government reform ===
The Western Sydney Leadership Dialogue advocates radical local government reform to encourage best practice in Western Sydney. In a collaboration with Sydney Business Chamber, the Regional Advocacy released a report titled Governance Reform for Growth in 2018. The report proposed a City of Parramatta act and a new planning committee similar to the Central City Planning Committee.
