= Six Cities Region =

Administrative region of NSW, Australia

The Six Cities Region was an administrative megaregion in the state of New South Wales, Australia used in strategic and statutory land use planning strategies and regulation by the NSW Government, overseen by the Greater Cities Commission. The region was announced in 2021 by then-Premier Dominic Perrottet and formally legislated as part of the Environmental Planning and Assessment Act in 2022, before being quietly erased in early 2023 by newly elected Premier Chris Minns. It represented a formalisation of a widely understood linear spatial relationship between Greater Sydney, Central Coast, Newcastle and Wollongong. It consisted of the following areas:

- Lower Hunter and Greater Newcastle City - consisting of the City of Cessnock, City of Lake Macquarie, City of Maitland, City of Newcastle, and Port Stephens Council local government areas
- Central Coast City - consisting of the entirety of the Central Coast Council local government area
- Illawarra-Shoalhaven City - consisting of the Municipality of Kiama, City of Shellharbour, City of Shoalhaven and City of Wollongong, local government areas
- Western Parkland City - consisting of the City of Blue Mountains, Camden Council, City of Campbelltown, Fairfield City Council, City of Hawkesbury, City of Liverpool, City of Penrith and Wollondilly Shire local government areas
- Central River City - consisting of the Blacktown City Council, City of Canterbury-Bankstown, Cumberland City Council, Georges River Council, City of Parramatta, and The Hills Shire local government areas
- Eastern Harbour City - consisting of the Bayside Council, Municipality of Burwood, City of Canada Bay, Hornsby Shire, Municipality of Hunter's Hill, Inner West Council, Ku-ring-gai Council, Lane Cove Council, Mosman Council, North Sydney Council, Northern Beaches Council, City of Randwick, City of Ryde, Municipality of Strathfield, Sutherland Shire, City of Sydney, Waverley Council, City of Willoughby, and Municipality of Woollahra local government areas

The Six Cities Region served as a frame for regional planning in New South Wales, and broadly separates the metropolitan areas from the rural areas of the state. A discussion paper was released in September 2022 regarding the Six Cities Region.
