= Urban renewal in Sydney =

Ongoing land redevelopment of the new urban centres in Sydney, Australia

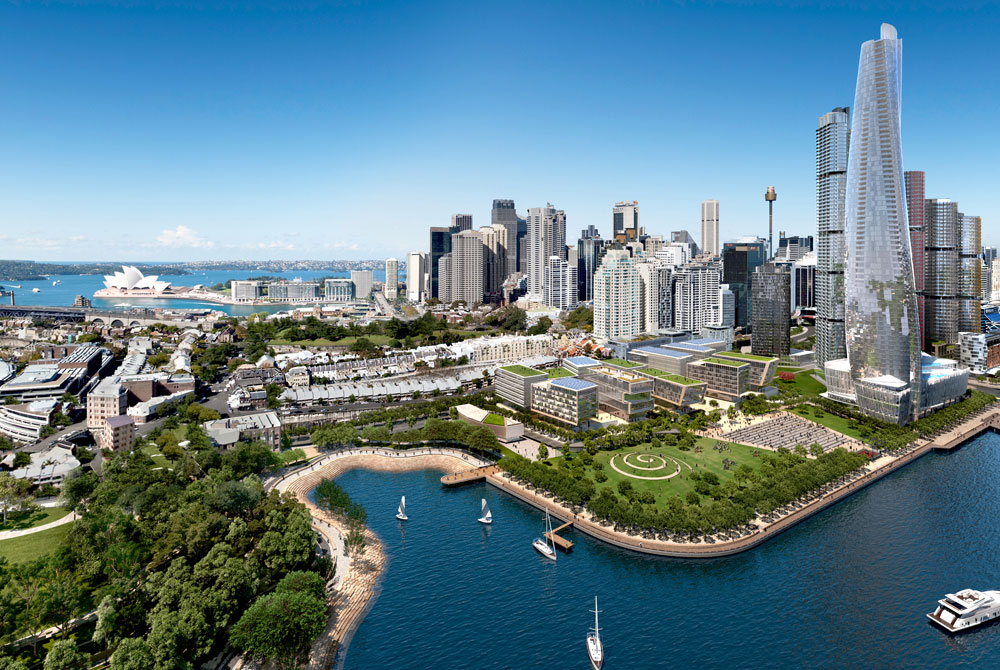
Artist rendition of the urban renewal of Barangaroo, Sydney

Urban renewal in Sydney is the ongoing process of housing redevelopment in Sydney, Australia. It typically includes construction of new buildings and changing neighbourhood character, and often involves upzoning. Urban renewal traditionally refers to large-scale government initiatives to redevelop buildings, streets or neighbourhoods, and may be conducted through urban planning in Sydney.

Locally and in the short term, redevelopment may be associated with the process of gentrification. Over time, economic modelling shows broad benefits of less restrictive zoning and increased housing density, such as more lower housing costs, bigger homes, shorter commutes, reduced travel costs, and less urban sprawl.

Recent large-scale public urban renewal projects include the areas of George Street, Green Square, Central Park, Zetland and Barangaroo. Ongoing rezonings are being undertaken in transit-oriented development precincts such as the Bays Precinct and Edgecliff Woollahra Precinct.

== Background ==
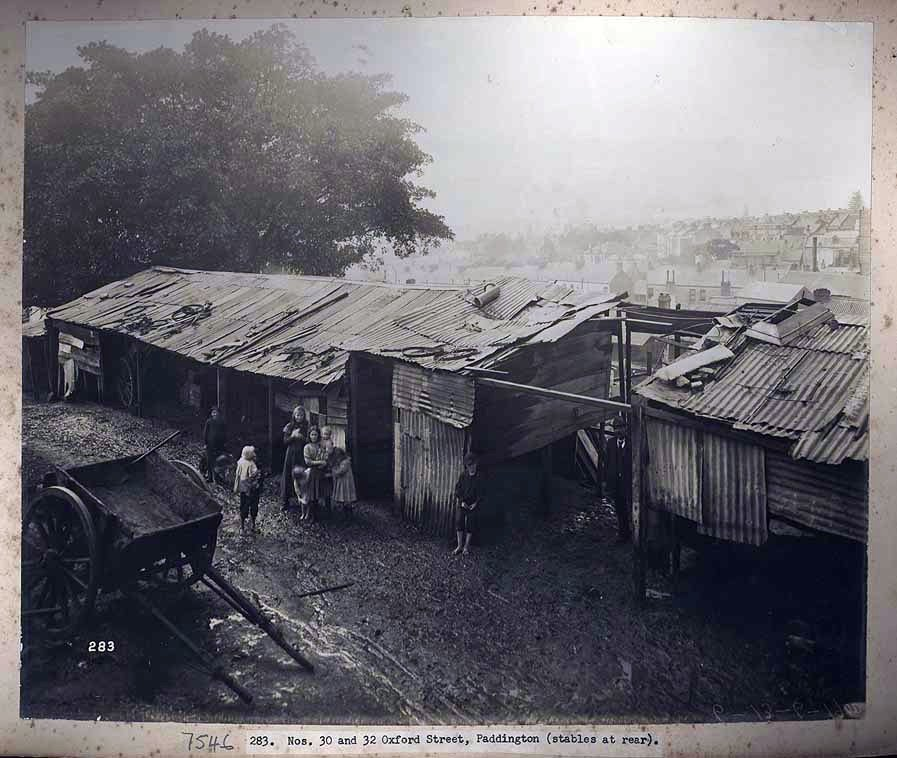
Slums in Paddington during the outbreak of the bubonic plague in 1900

Since the early 1900s, Sydney has experienced rounds of urban renewal that continued to the 21st century with new plans and projects that contribute to the city's changing urban landscape. Sydney's urban redevelopment reflects the cycles of economic growth, with rapid housing development in periods of expansion, followed by the rise of poverty and misery in times of economic downturn. With the gold rush in the 1850s which later coincided with the 1860s depression, the inner-city slums of Glebe, The Rocks, Paddington, Surry Hills and Ultimo were born.

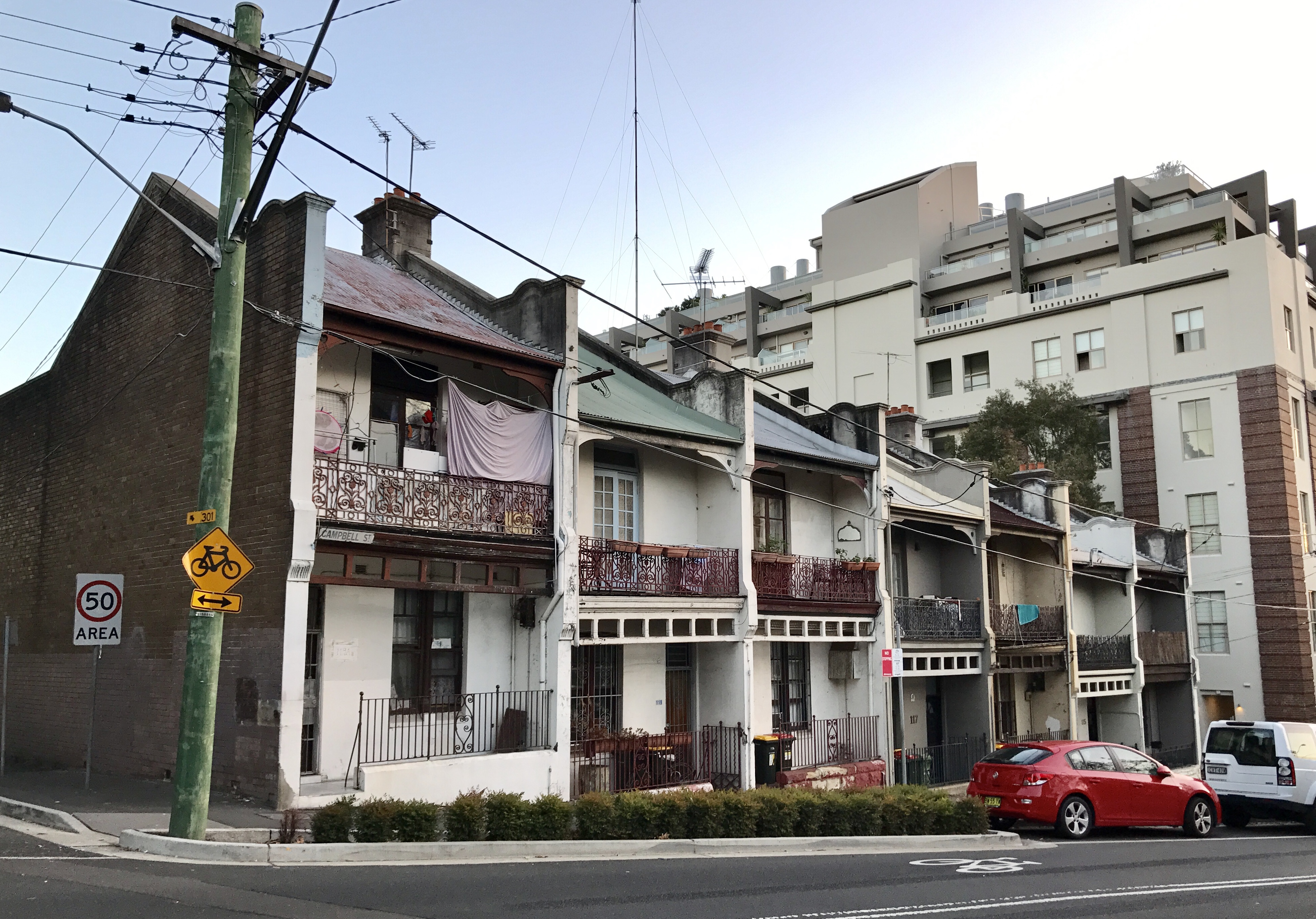
Terrace houses in Campbell Street, Surry Hills

Suburban living was reserved for the affluent and wealthy, which accounted for 4.29 percent of the colony (a population of 5,543 people) in 1843. As the number of middle-class and bourgeois increased, so did the number of people living in Sydney suburbia where suburbanites made up 24.5 percent of the colony (a population of 275,631) in 1891. The Victorian-era terrace houses that feature in some of Sydney's inner-city areas, were constructed as part of the building boom in the 1880s and featured 4-5 rooms with primitive features that were ahead of their time. At the end of the 19th century, inner-city living was no longer desirable as the suburbs became more accessible with the development and expansion of the Sydney railway network, leaving the terraces to despair. With the 1900 outbreak of the bubonic plague in Darling Harbour, the waterfront working-class slums that surrounded (including Millers Point and The Rocks) were razed and slated for renewal, due to the century-old unregulated building practices in place and poor sanitation. These areas were later redeveloped into warehouses and port facilities; marking the first of three rounds (later in the 1920s and 1960-70s) of redevelopment and slum clearing in Sydney.

Following World War II, there was an influx of immigrants that tripled Sydney's population and brought rise to the "Australian dream" of living in a suburban home on a quarter acre block. As Sydney's population grew, the city continued to sprawl to the west and south-west, where new "garden suburbs" were developed 50 km from the city centre. In the 1970s, workplaces and inner-city factories started to move to the suburbs and commuting to the city started to lose its appeal. The inner-city slums were steadily redeveloped as professionals moved in, creating mixed communities that included the older working class, remnants of the underclass and light industry and service vendors. In the 21st century, living in these inner-city areas had become highly sought after and waves of gentrification have elevated house prices and transformed these former slums to cosmopolitan and trendy mixed precincts.

== History ==
=== 1960s ===
Since the 1940s, urban renewal across Australian cities had been identified as key to its functioning in both state and federal government policies. In the late 1960s, there were calls for federal action over public agitation against the attitudes of neglect from state governments and the state of Australian inner cities.

=== 1970s ===
With the election of the Whitlam government in 1972, the Department of Urban & Regional Development was established and tasked to develop an inner urban policy and assist urban regeneration projects. This led to the rehabilitation projects for Glebe, Waterloo and Woolloomooloo.

The department was abolished and incorporated into the Department of Environment, Housing & Community Development, where funding on urban and regional development halved, tighter budget reforms were enforced, and provisions for community and private sector involvement were made.

=== 1980s ===
Since the 1980s, government intervention in urban development shifted, leading to the progression of the neoliberisation of governance, enabling the private sector a greater role in delivering urban ambitions. Such restructuring led to the redevelopment of the inner-city areas of Pyrmont and Ultimo as part of the Australian Government's Building Better Cities Program. Fundamental to the success of the Program was private investment, which enabled redevelopment projects such as Pyrmont-Ultimo take shape.

The transition to a neoliberal governance structure since the 1980s has seen the state-led delivery urban renewal projects shift from public to private investment. This is facilitated by strong domestic and international investment in the highly-speculative property market. The move away from the government's previous stance on urban sprawl has led to a wave of mass urban consolidation as a reaction to the 'quarter acre block' being wasteful in terms of infrastructure provision and land scarcity. The urban renewal of areas to create high density communities has been driven by speculative developers which saw lending for investment properties rising 150% between 2013 and 2015. Consequently, there has been an increasing disparity between urban ambitions set out by government masterplans, and the actual delivery of the urban projects. These public ambitions have steered to reflect those of the private sector evident in renewal projects such as Barangaroo and cautioned for the Bays Precinct.

== Implications ==
=== Housing affordability ===
Over time, economic modelling shows broad benefits of less restrictive zoning and increased housing density, such as more lower housing costs, bigger homes, shorter commutes, reduced travel costs, and less urban sprawl.

=== Net housing loss ===
Eastern Suburbs councils in Sydney have raised concern of redevelopment shrinking housing supply. Audits from councils including Randwick, City of Sydney, Woollahra and Waverley found a some redevelopments had a net loss of homes. The Sydney Morning Herald wrote that two council reports concluded the Government of New South Wales Low and Mid-Rise Housing Policy would "accelerate the loss of homes". The state government claims the policy will provide 112,000 homes in five years.

In the City of Sydney, there was a net loss of 65 dwellings in 25 DAs from 2018 to May 2024. As of May 2024 there were 8 DAs that "propose a reduction of a total" of 143 dwellings.

Randwick Council found 19 developments had a reduction of 86 homes across the local government area from April 2018 and May 2026 (10.75/year). 26 of the 86 reduction in homes were from a development of a new co-living student accommodation development in Kensington. The council was concerned about the loss, and would impact on the council's NSW Government-mandated requirement to deliver 4,000 additional homes from July 2024 to 2029 (800 per year).

Woollahra Council's planning proposal is titled Addressing Net Dwelling Loss. Between March 2020 and January 2025, the council had a net dwelling loss of 83 dwellings across 35 approvals, with an additional net loss of 10 dwellings across 7 DAs awaiting determination, leading to a potential reduction of 93 homes. Woollahra has a state-mandated target to deliver 1900 dwellings from July 2024 to 2029 (380 per year). As of October 2026, it is with the state government for assessment and finalisation.

Waverley's proposal is titled Residential dwelling density in the R3 & R4 zones. Analysis between January 2017 and November 2022 (~6 years) found 92 constructed dwellings were submitted for removal, and "dozens" more were reduced from approved buildings (~15 dwellings per year submitted for removal). The largest loss was to replace a boarding house development with new Residential Flat Development (RFD) or retirement homes, with the proposed Philip Nursing Home replacing 67 dwellings with 45. Waverley's state-mandated housing target is to construct 2,400 new homes by 2029 (480 per year (Note: Assuming from July 2024)).

=== Displacement of residents ===
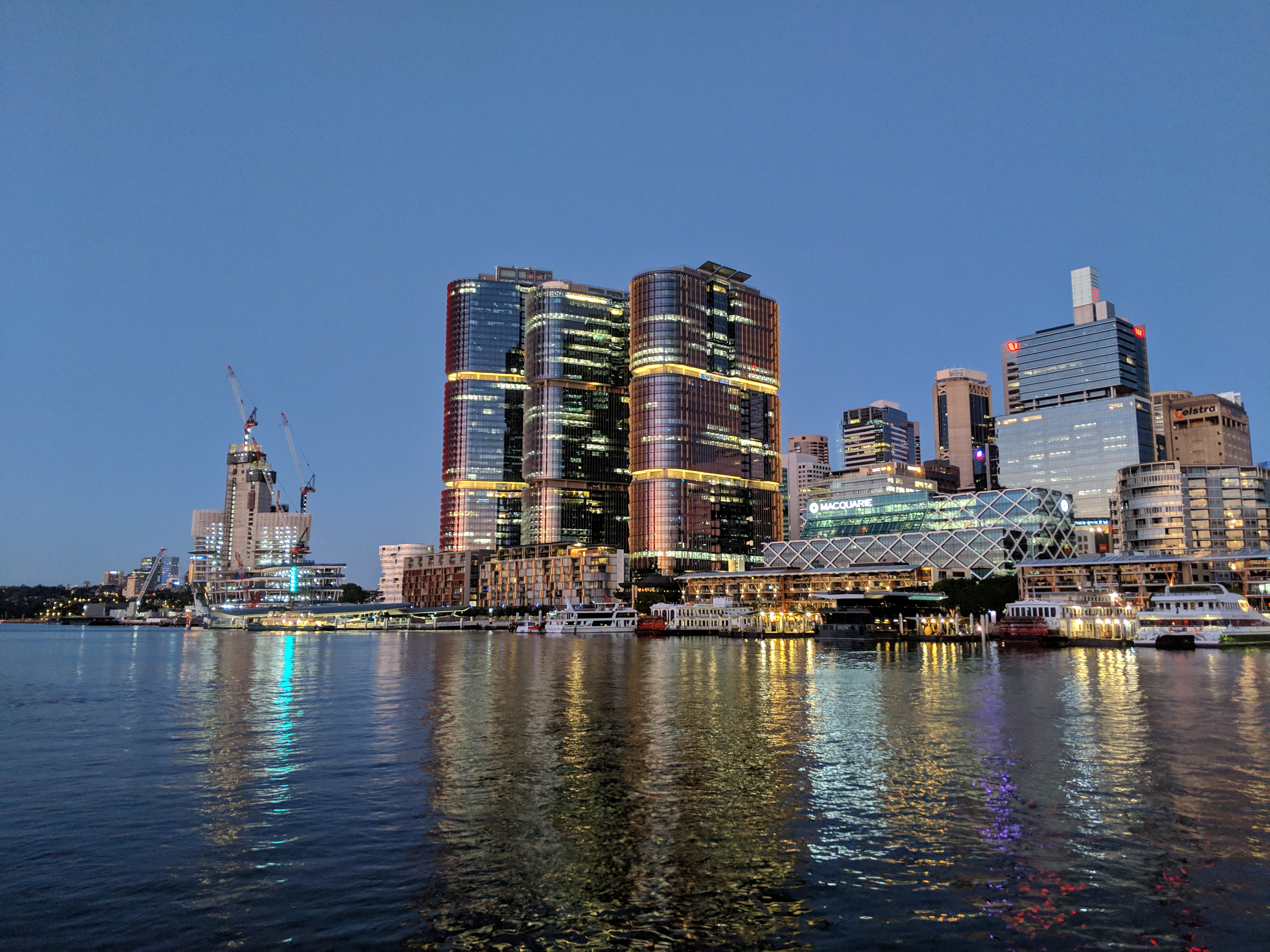
Barangaroo from Pyrmont Bridge with Crown Sydney under construction

With the renewal and subsequent gentrification of inner-city Sydney, the displacement of residents was a common occurrence. These areas were often home to a marginalised ageing and industrial workforce and population, where the inward movement of professionals of middle and upper class and establishment of new mixed service outlets geared towards those with higher levels of disposable income in areas with historically low-income earners. Such displacement occurred for the inner-city area of Millers Point, where the surrounding deindustrialisation and later revitalisation of Walsh Bay and The Hungry Mile/East Darling Harbour (known today as Barangaroo) led to a cultural shift whereby the area become highly sought after with an increase in land values.

== Neighbourhoods ==
=== Barangaroo ===
Barangaroo
- Status: In construction (Barangaroo South and Barangaroo Reserve complete)
- Groundbreaking: 2011
- Estimated completion: 2024
- Opening: 2015 (Barangaroo Reserve)
- Website: Barangaroo.com

Companies
- Developer: Lend Lease (Barangaroo South and Barangaroo Reserve); Grocon, Aqualand and Scentre Group (Barangaroo Central)
- Owner: NSW Government
- Manager: Infrastructure NSW

Technical details
- Cost: $6 billion+
- Size: 22 hectares
- No. of residents: 3,500 (projected)
- No. of workers: 24,000

On the western waterfront of Sydney's central business district is Barangaroo, a 22 hectare, mixed-use precinct consisting of commercial, residential and public spaces; split into three parts: Barangaroo Central, Barangaroo Reserve and Barangaroo South. The $6 billion redevelopment of the former shipping yard, is slated for completion by 2024 with a new metro station, several apartment complexes and a 275-metre tower slated to be Sydney's tallest building and home to Crown Sydney. Barangaroo is Sydney's largest urban renewal project and aims to be the world's first carbon neutral precinct through responsible waste management, water recycling and solar energy use and generation. When the project was announced in 2005, the brief stated that at least 50% of the land would be parkland, with a foreshore walk. The winning design proposed 389,511 square metres of floor space with a waterfront park stretching the entire foreshore and the tallest building towering 92 metres. That design was dropped in favour Lendlease, who won the rights the develop Barangaroo. There were eight revisions to Lendlease's original plan with the final plan proposing 681,008 square metres of floor space, a separate headland park and a Crown Resorts in the tallest tower.

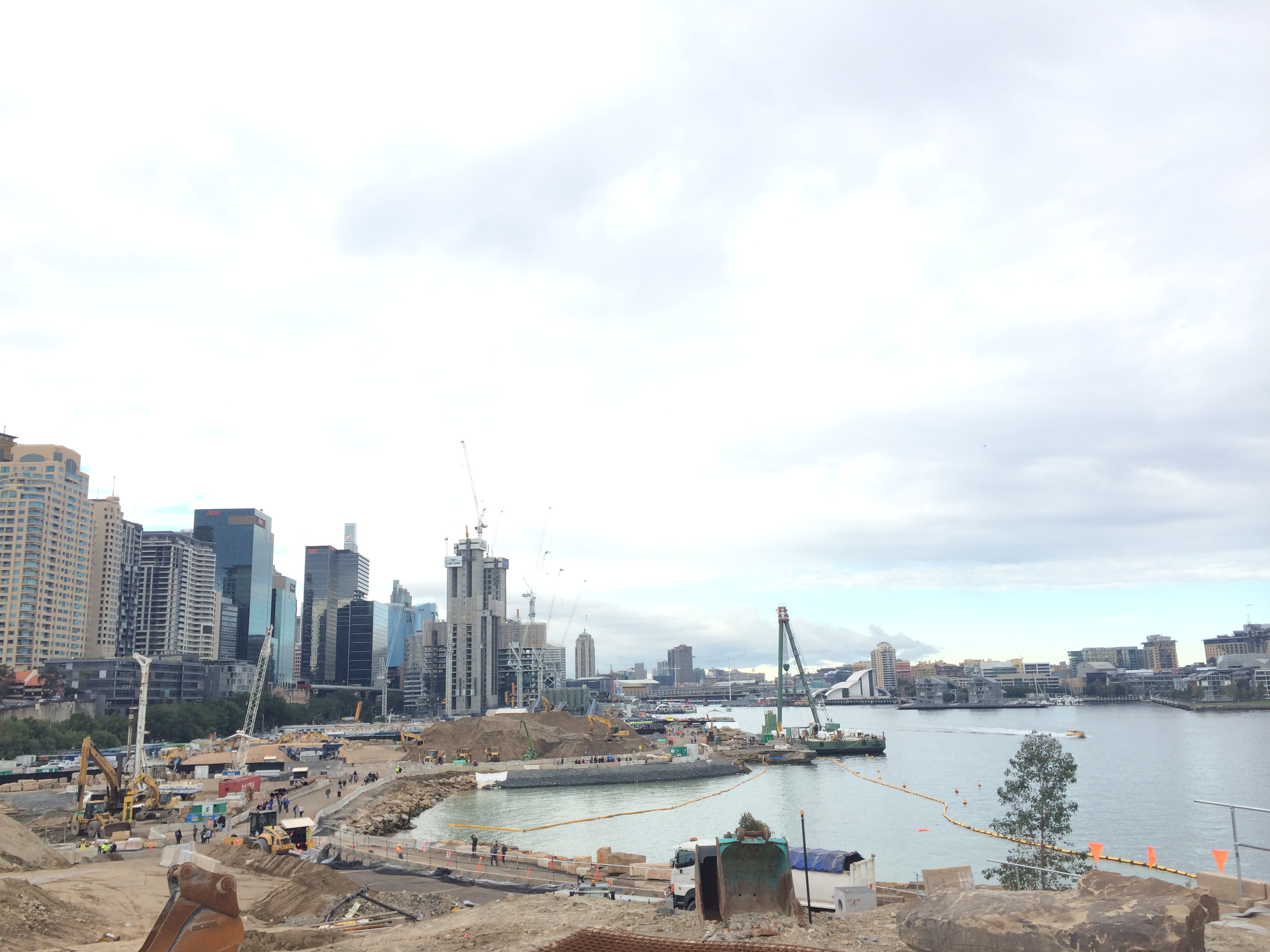
Barangaroo Central and Barangaroo South in construction in 2014

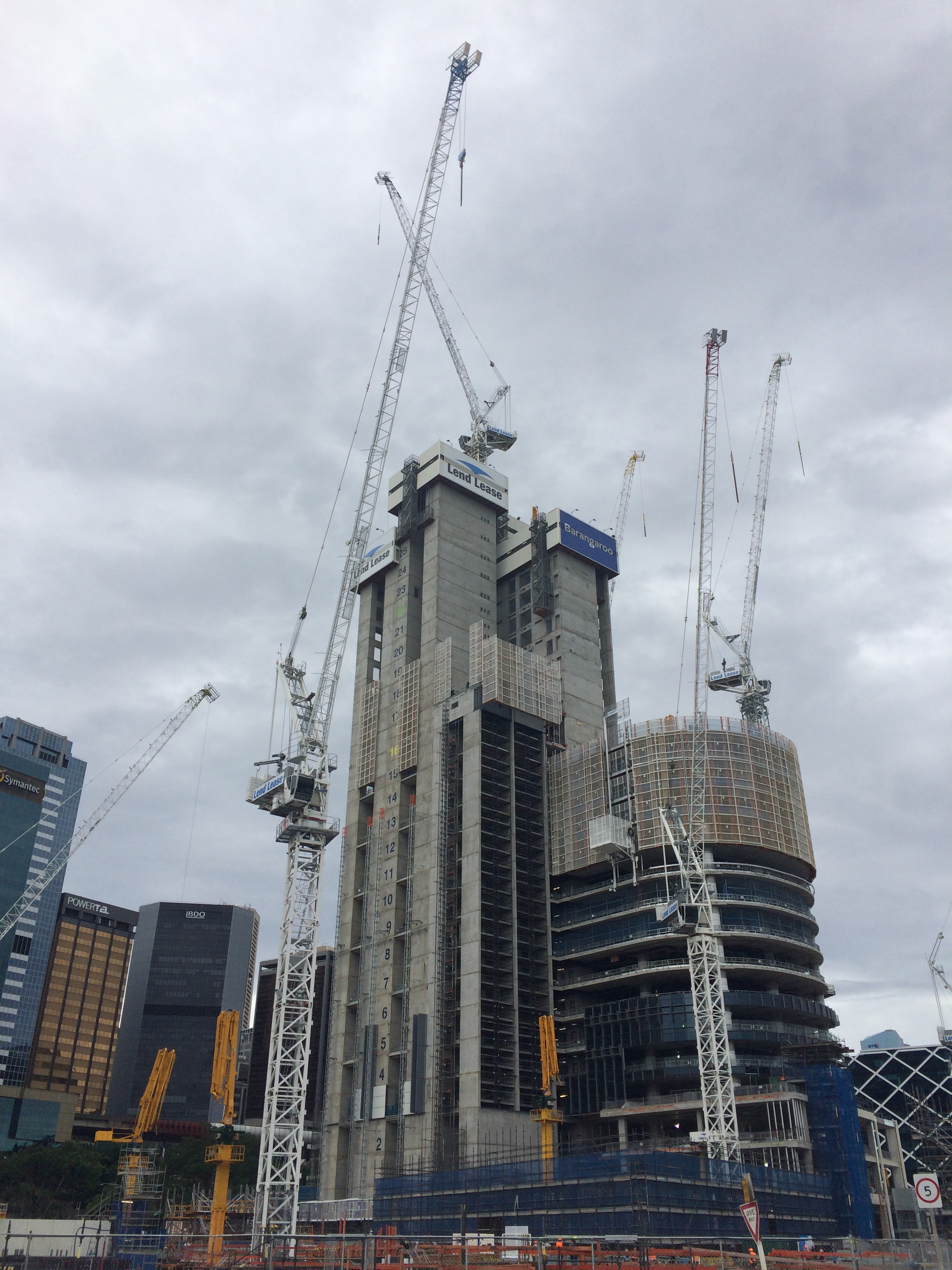
International Tower 1 in construction in 2014

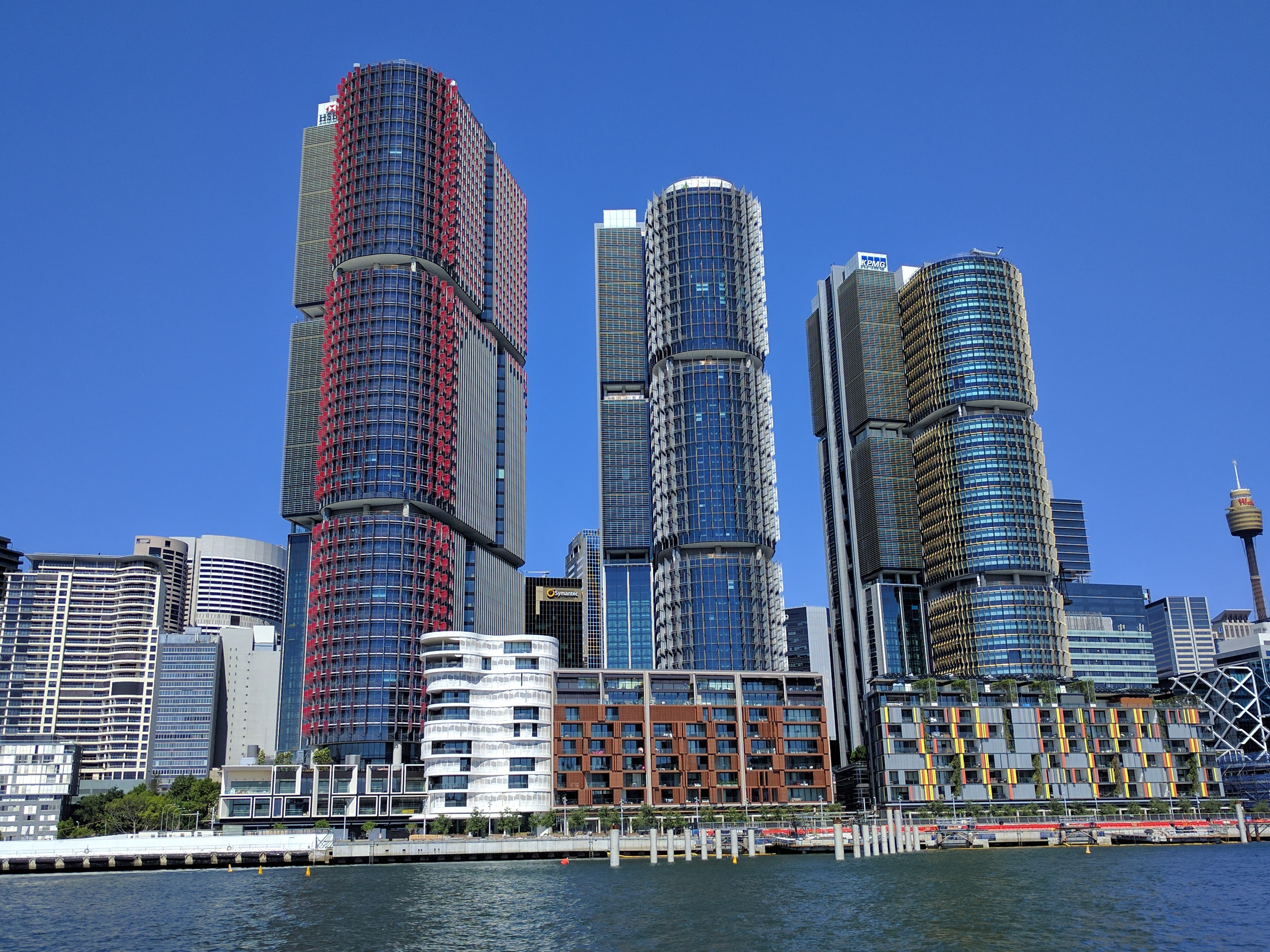
International Towers (1,2,3), Barangaroo

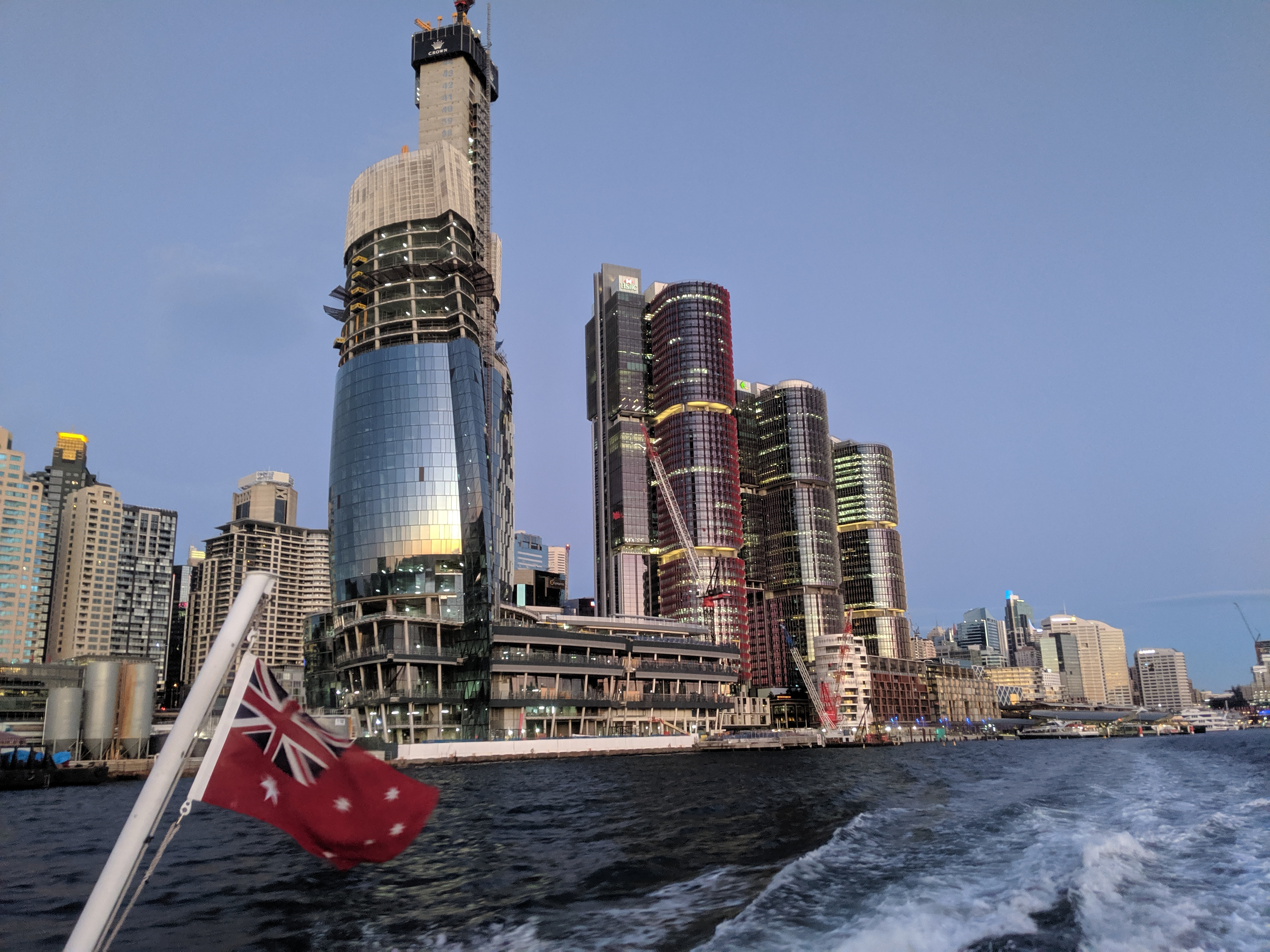
View of Crown Sydney construction

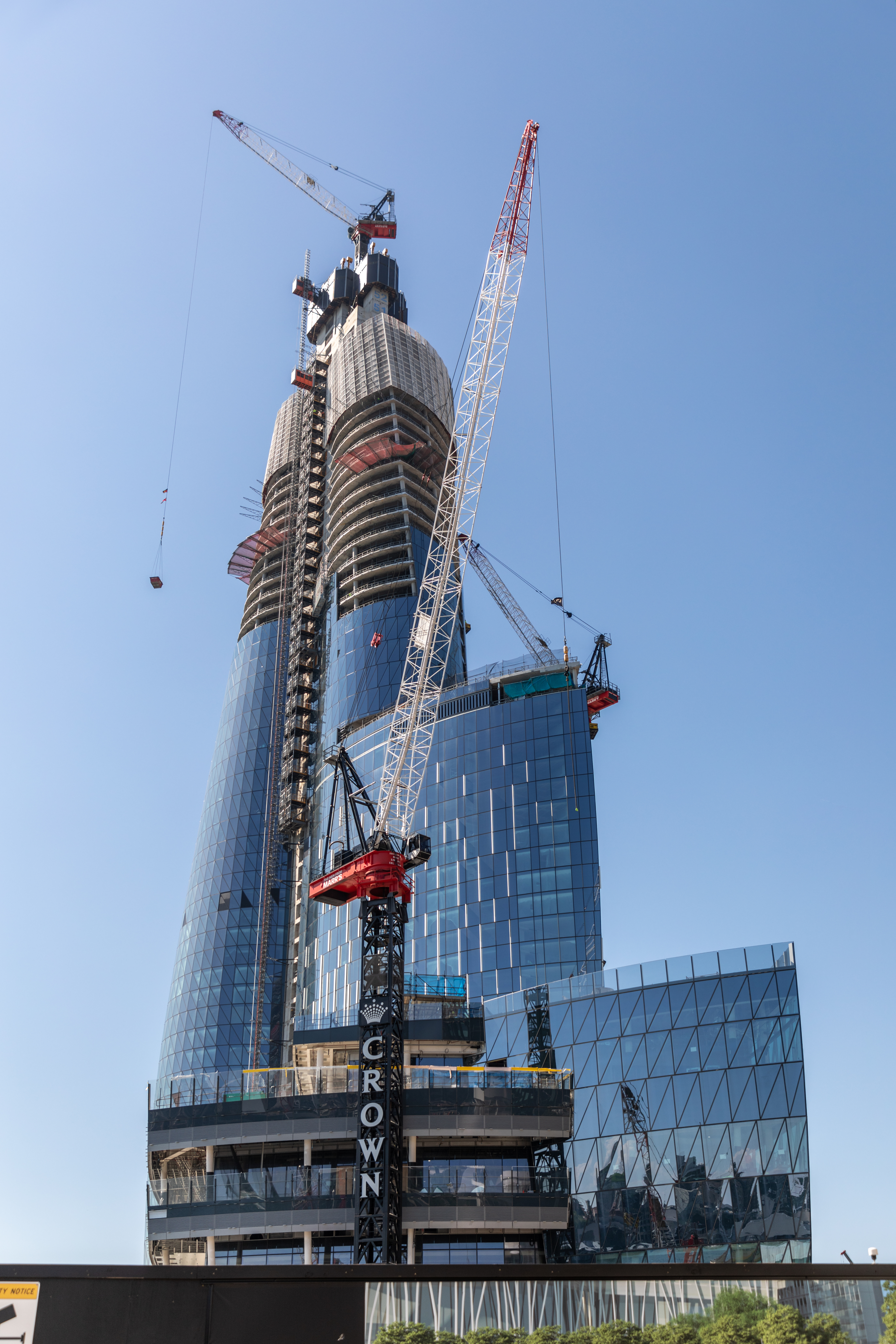
Crown Sydney in construction (2019)

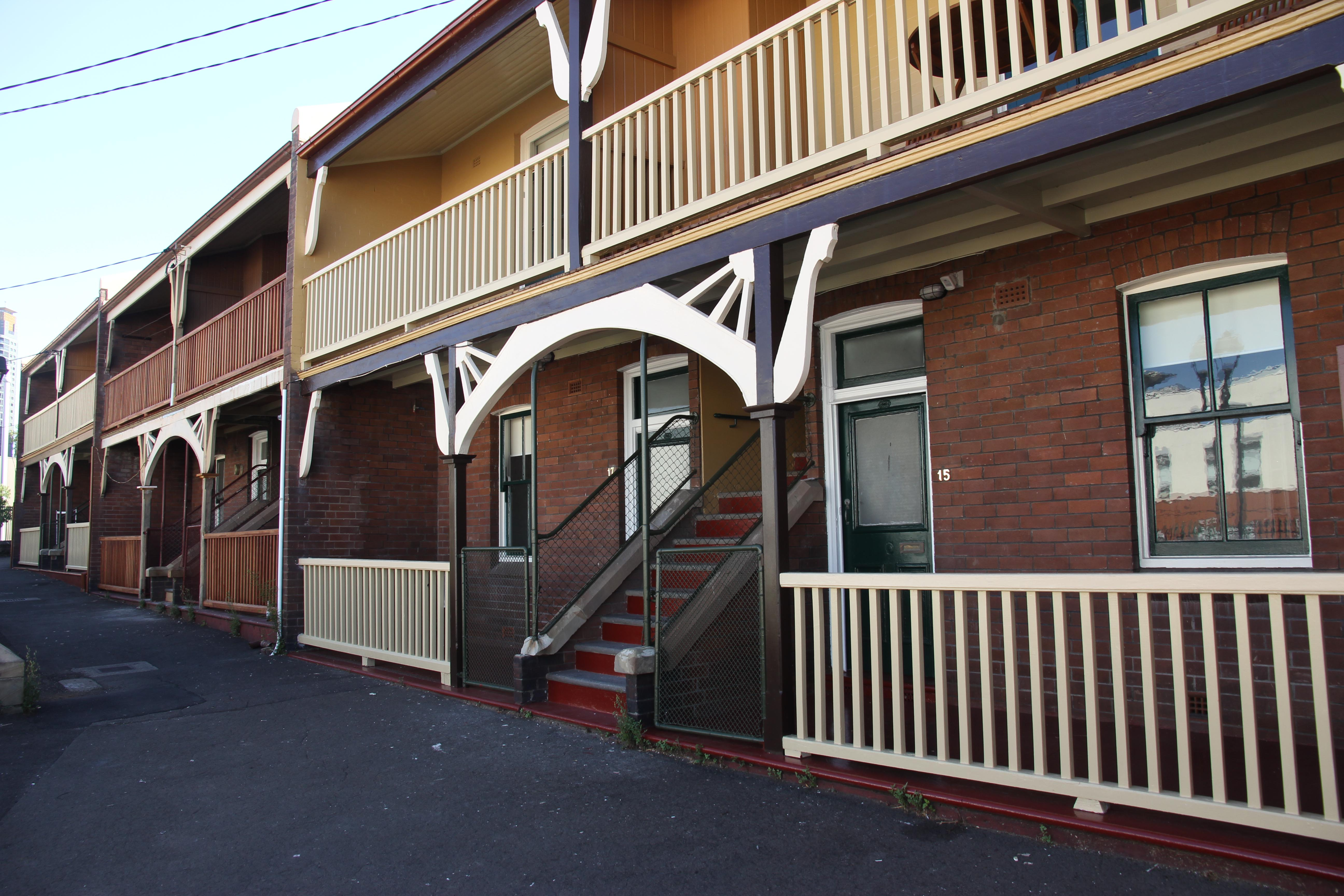
Public housing in Millers Point

==== Forced removal of Millers Point residents ====
Adjacent to Barangaroo lies the suburb of Millers Point, consisting of mostly public housing and was described by residents as a "village within the metropolis". In March 2014, the Minister for Family and Community Services, who was responsible for public housing in New South Wales, Pru Goward, announced that 293 public housing properties across Millers Point and the adjoining Dawes Point and The Rocks would be sold off. This included those who resided in the 12-storey Sirius apartment block in The Rocks. Consequently, all 579 tenants were required to relocate to alternative housing, with the revenue generated from the sale to build additional housing to help address the 57,000 housing deficit at the time. The displacement is a result of the gentrification of the area as the NSW Government saw an opportunity to sell state-owned assets with the increase in house prices in the area. Following the announcement of the sale, Friends of Millers Point was created; a coalition of supporters that opposed the forced relocation of residents.

=== Pyrmont–Ultimo ===
Pyrmont–Ultimo
- Status: Complete

Companies
- Developer: including Lend Lease and Meriton
- Manager: City West Development Corporation

Technical details
- Cost: $278 million
- No. of residents: 21,656 (2016 Census)
- No. of workers: 22,000 (2004)

Pyrmont and Ultimo sit adjacent to the Sydney central business district as a mixed-use entertainment, residential and commercial area, formerly the industrial precinct that existed prior to the 1980s. From the mid-19th century, the area was home to primary industries and their storage, processing and export facilities. Pyrmont–Ultimo housed Sydney's first power station, with shipbuilding, steel, wool, and flour industries that contributed to the local economy. Colonial Sugar Refinery opened its factories in 1878 and was the last to shut down its Pyrmont operations in 1992 as the area underwent renewal. During this period of revitalisation throughout the 1990s, local industry closed down and its residents and businesses relocated to the suburbs. According to the census, Pyrmont and Ultimo experienced a population decline from 4,007 residents in 1961, further dropping to 2,598 in 1971, and 1,590 by 1981. What was once a vibrant and bustling industrial hub, turned derelict by the mid-1970s, which was voted at the time as the worst place to live in Sydney, along with Zetland. In the early 1990s, under the federal government's Building Better Cities Program, much of the program's $278 million budget was allocated to revitalise the area to a high-density, post-modern development. More than 9,200 dwellings were built, including 16 apartment blocks that formed Jackson's Landing; a high-end development at the northern end of the peninsula. The population in the area had grown to 4,615 in 1996, 14,165 by 2001, and 21,656 according to the 2016 census. The renewal of Pyrmont and Ultimo metaphorically represented Sydney's transition from 'old economy' to 'new economy' and reflects Sydney's repositioning as a global city. In 2019, a proposal was made to rezone and redevelop Pyrmont and the surrounding Western Harbour Precinct as an area that can generate up to $20 billion in economic growth and 10,000 jobs. This proposal came during a time when Pyrmont was identified as a potential stop in the new Sydney Metro West network.

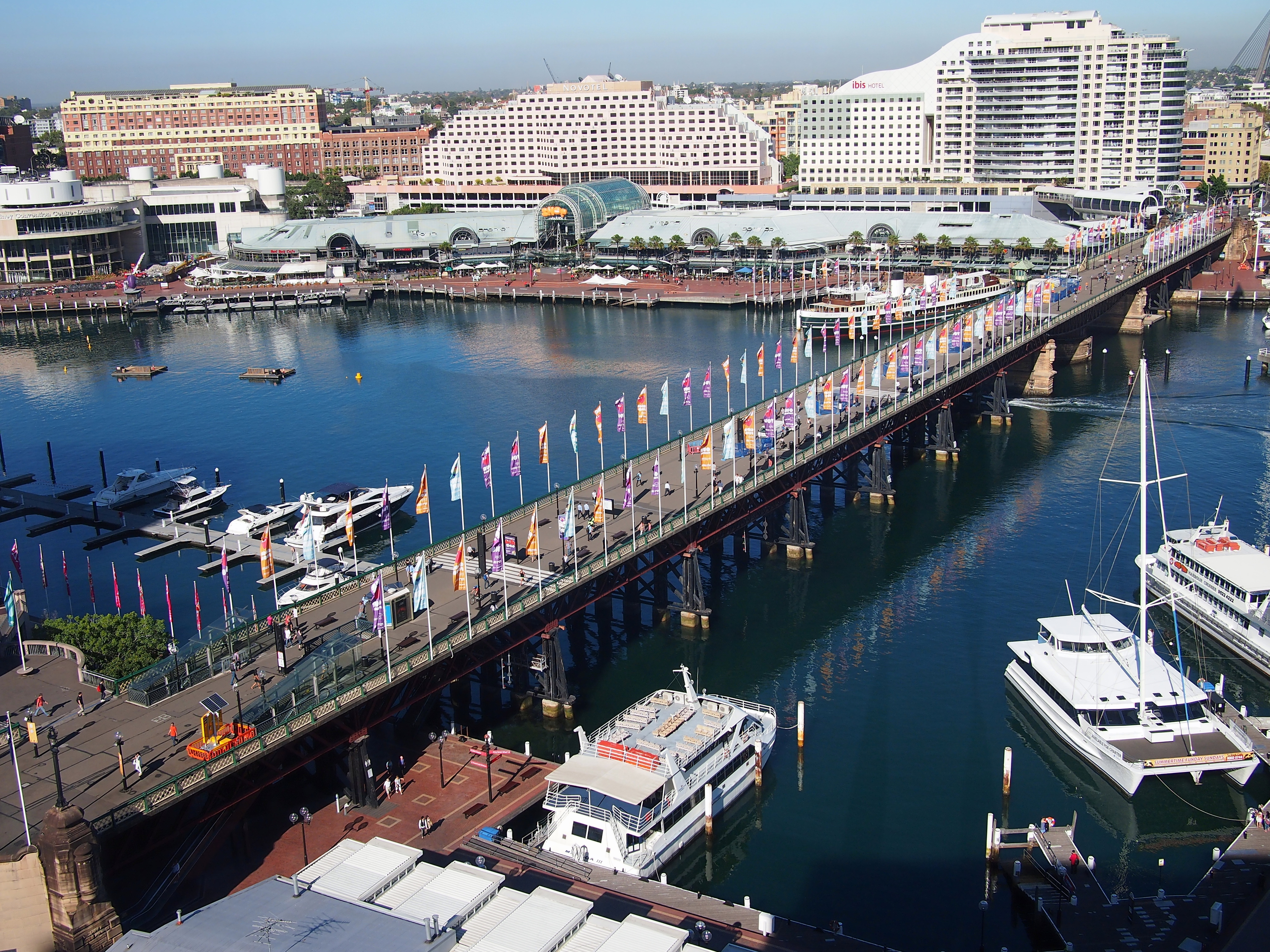
Pyrmont Bridge (looking towards Pyrmont)

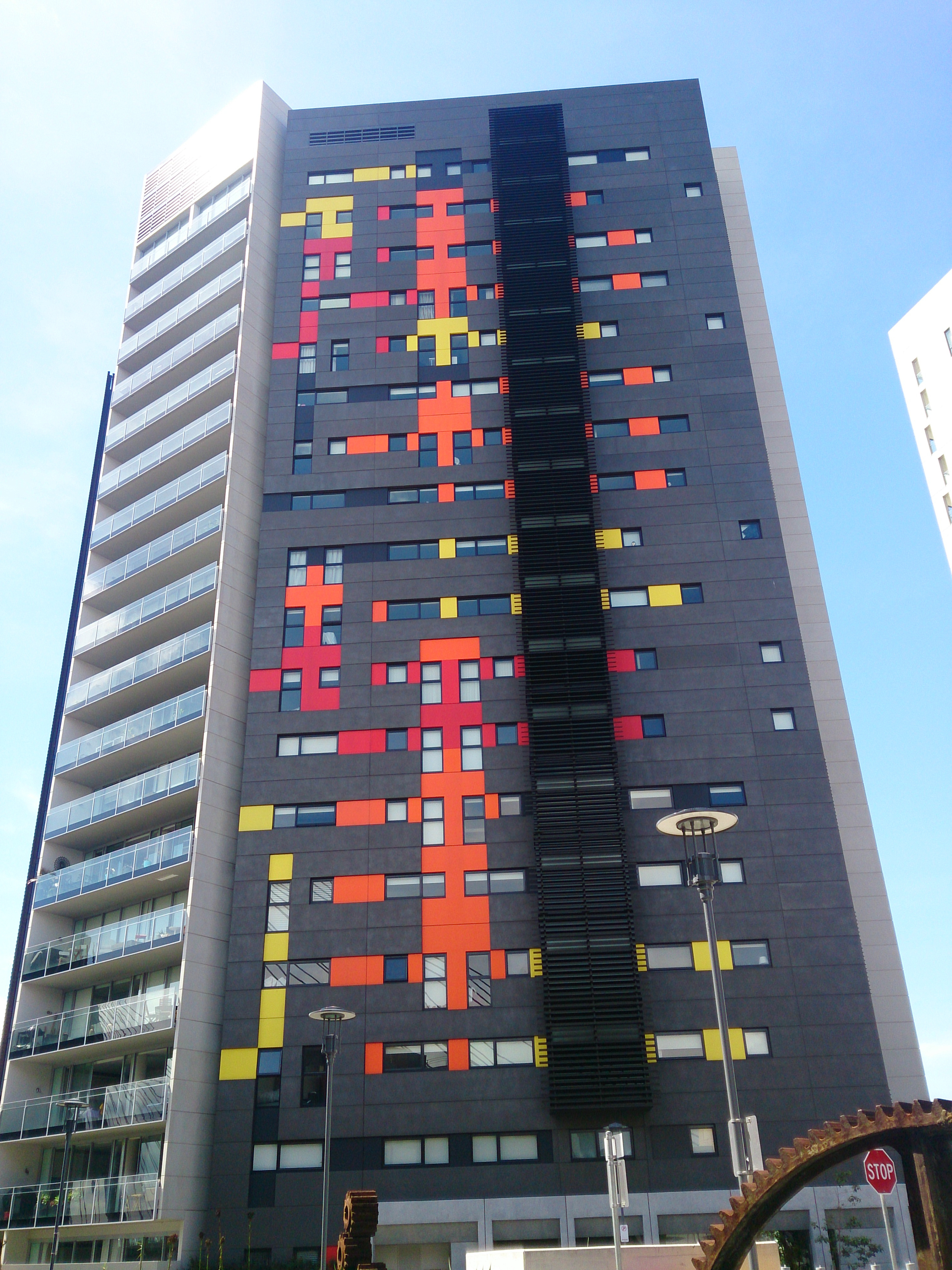
Apartment complex in Pyrmont

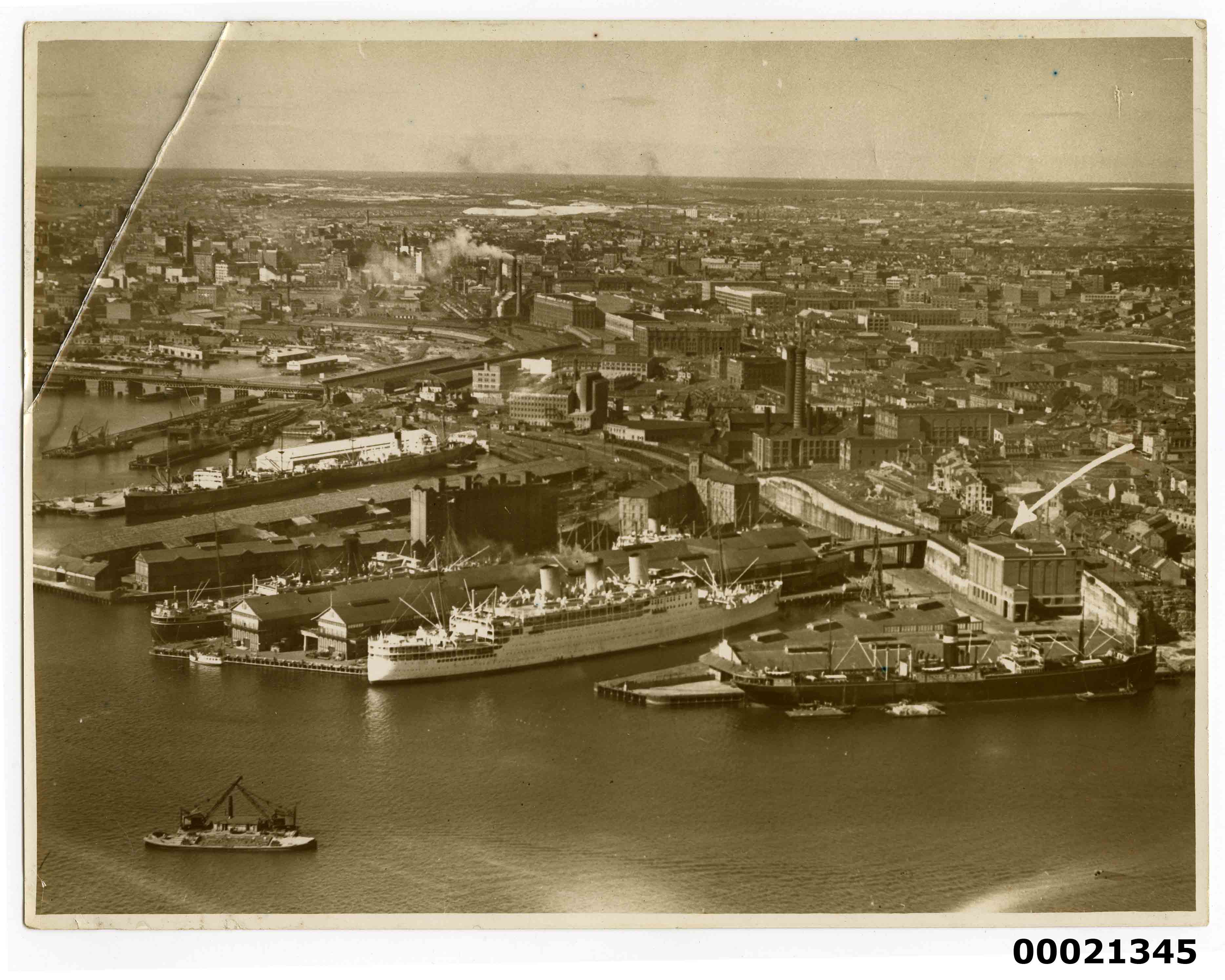
Aerial view of Pyrmont in the first half of the nineteenth century

== Region Plans ==
=== A Metropolis of Three Cities ===
The Greater Sydney Region Plan – A Metropolis of Three Cities was published by the Greater Sydney Commission in March 2018. It identified three major cities and included five district plans.

In June 2023, the newly elected Minns government announced staff of the Greater Cities Commission would be folded back into the Department of Planning and Environment. In August 2026, The Sydney Plan replaced the Greater Sydney Region Plan: A Metropolis of Three Cities.

== Future projects ==
=== Central Precinct ===
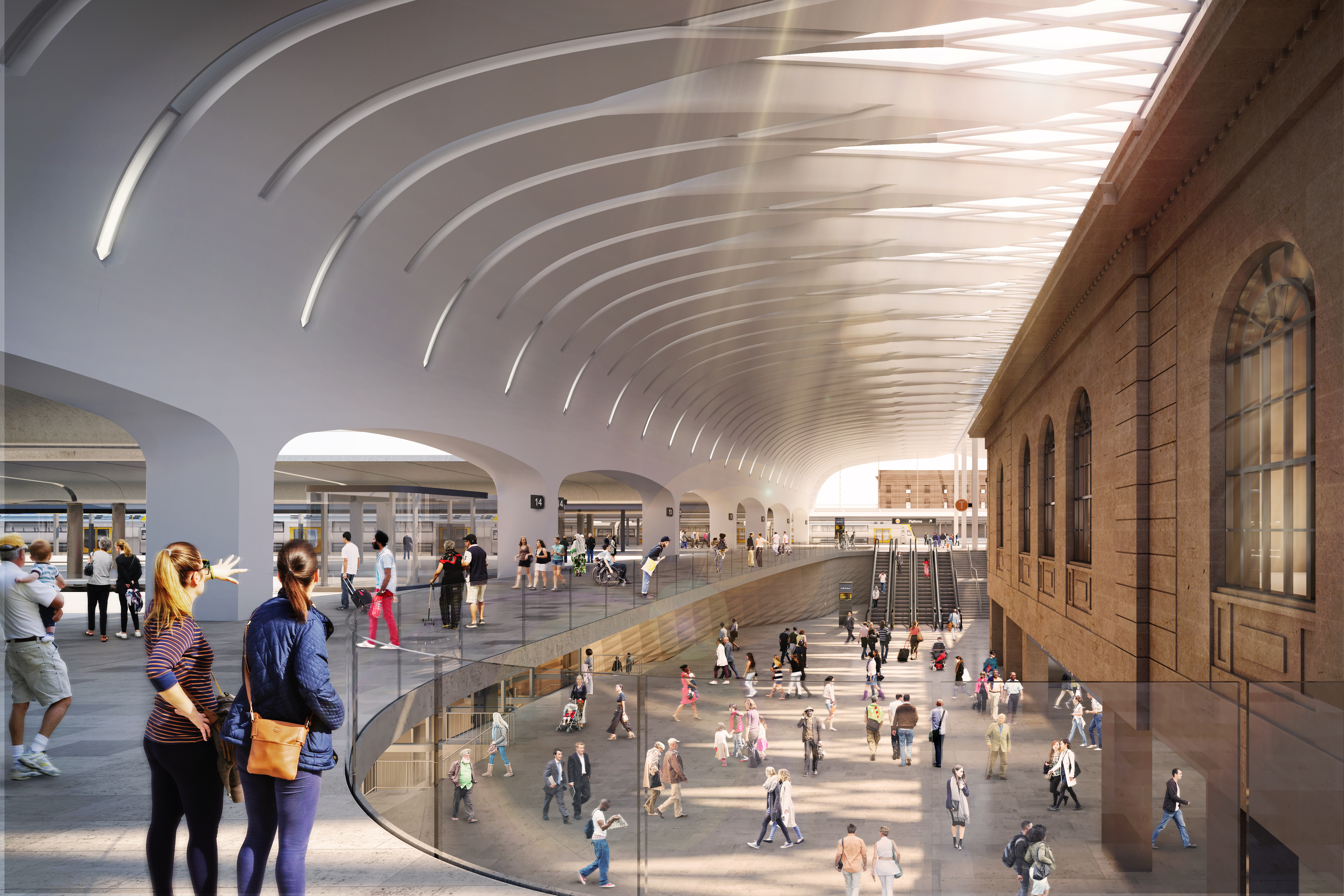
Render of the refurbishment of Central Station

The Central Precinct represents over 24 hectares of government-owned land that is proposed to be revitalised along the railway corridor between Central station and Cleveland Street. A mixed-use urban precinct consisting of offices, parks and shops with the potential of residential apartments is envisioned and planned to be built over existing railyards, attracting technology companies and start-ups. The precinct aims to create 25,000 jobs, foster innovation and increase educational opportunities. Tech giant Atlassian is set to anchor a 35-storey office tower as part of the precinct. In 2018, work started on the redevelopment of Central Station which include the construction of new underground metro platforms, a new underground concourse (Central Walk), and accessibility improvements. This all allowed new costumers to access platforms 16 and 23 directly via elevator and escalator. The renewal of the station was completed in 2022.

=== The Bays Precinct ===
The Bays Precinct will be one of Sydney's most significant urban renewal projects with almost 100 hectares of land to be redeveloped between White Bay Power Station, Blackwattle Bay and Rozelle Yard over the next 20 to 30 years. The Precinct is the largest urban transformation project since the 2000 Sydney Olympics with its 95-hectares of waterways and 5.5 kilometre waterfront. UrbanGrowth NSW released its transformation plan in 2015, outlining the strategic direction of the project. Masterplans for the precinct were in development, with community consultations formerly anticipated for 2020; The Bays West Consultation Strategy was released in November, 2021. The Bays Precinct will be home to the new Sydney Fish Market (which was opened on the 19 January, 2026), a new metro station as well as a mix of commercial, cultural and residential uses.

== Action groups ==
There are a number of Resident Action Groups, or advocacy groups, who seek to influence urban renewal in Sydney. Many formed during or around the Green Bans movement.

Before 1988, most permanent urban action groups were in northern Sydney. Resident Action Groups were formed in the Western Sydney suburbs of Penrith, Blacktown, Blue Mountains and Fairfield between 1988 and 1991.

By mid-1991 there were a number of 'Urban Development' focused resident action groups in Sydney. There were 43 in inner Sydney, 36 in middle Sydney, and 19 in outer Sydney. 'Traffic Concerns', 'Environmental' and 'Heritage' were other concerns of these groups.

The Sydney Alliance is a group of community leaders which challenges policymakers on housing alongside environmental issues. In 2011, Amanda Tattersall and Kurt Iveson met through involvement in launching the "people power project".

== See also ==
- Urban planning in Australia
- Urbanization in Australia
- Sydney YIMBY
