= Development application =

Form of application lodged in New South Wales, Australia

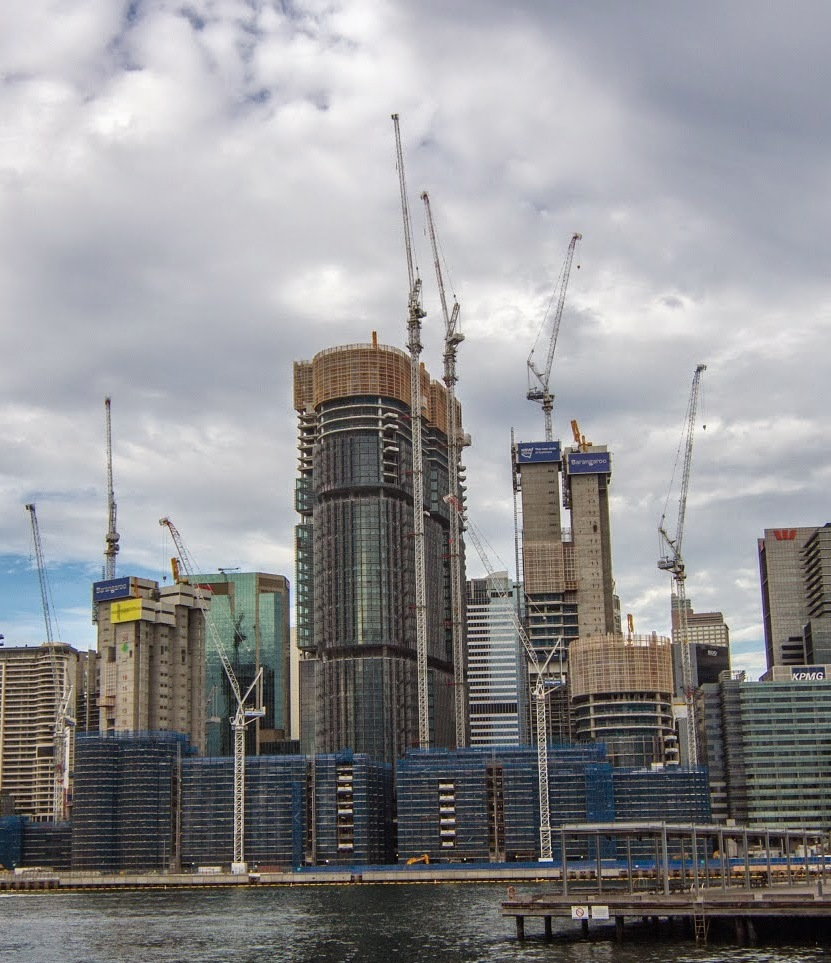
Construction works undertaken presumably following a development application

A development application (or DA) is a type of application made in New South Wales under Part 4 of the Environmental Planning and Assessment Act 1979 to seek permission for the carrying out of development. In this context, development can include the construction or alteration of buildings, the use of land, the subdivision of land, and demolition.

== Statistics ==
Nearly 85% of DAs are assessed by local Councils, of which 97% were determined by Council staff in FY21. 90% of DAs are for works that cost less than $1 million.

== Process ==
DAs must be assessed having regard to various considerations, including relevant policies, environmental impacts, site suitability, public submissions, and the public interest. It therefore involves a level of environmental impact assessment.

All DAs must be submitted through the NSW Planning Portal.

Not every type of development requires a DA, with some very low impact works classified as 'exempt development' such that no approval is required. A 'complying development certificate' (CDC) may also be available as an alternative to a DA where certain standards are satisfied.

=== Determination ===
A development application may be determined by approval (either conditionally or unconditionally) to issue a 'development consent' or refusal, but when approved it is nearly always subject to conditions. Conditions must be authorised by relevant legislation and satisfy the "Newbury Test".

=== Reviews & appeals ===
An applicant may apply for a review against the decision of a consent authority. An applicant has 6 months to lodge a review and can decide whether a review is determined by a local planning panel where the original DA was not. On appeal, the Land and Environment Court of New South Wales re-makes the original decision, and decides whether to impose any conditions on the grant of consent.

== Types of development applications ==
A DA made by or on behalf of the Crown is called a Crown development application, and are subject to special arrangements, including that they cannot be refused without the approval of the Minister for Planning and Public Spaces, and that a consent authority is subject to direction by the Minister. The definition of the Crown extends to other bodies, such as certain Australian universities.

State significant development (SSD) proposals are also assessed as a type of DA and include the requirements for community consultation, in some cases including public hearings by the Independent Planning Commission, such as some SSD applications exceeding 50 public objections.

== See also ==
- Department of Planning, Housing and Infrastructure
- Environmental Planning and Assessment Act 1979
- Minister for Planning and Public Spaces
- For the UK, see e.g. Planning permission in the United Kingdom
