= John Percival Tate =

New Zealand-born Australian politician

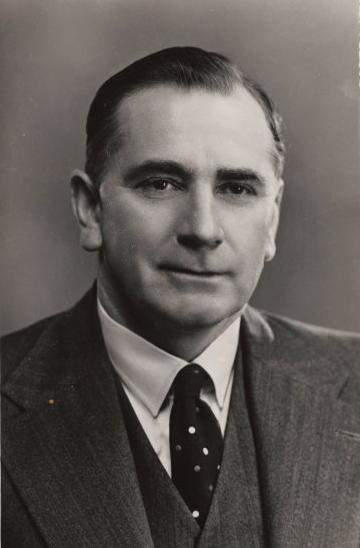

Senator for New South Wales
- In office 22 February 1950 – 30 June 1953

Alderman of the Sydney City Council
- In office 23 December 1947 – 30 November 1956
- Constituency: Gipps Ward; City Ward

Alderman of the Ryde Municipal Council
- In office 2 December 1944 – 8 December 1948

Councillor of the Cumberland County Council
- In office 20 September 1945 – 31 January 1951
- Succeeded by: Clement Weil
- Constituency: No. 8

Personal details
- Born: John Henry Tate; 21 March 1894 Wellington, New Zealand
- Died: 21 January 1977 (aged 84) Canberra, Australia
- Party: Liberal
- Spouses: Gladys Woodland (m. 1920; died 1974) Bernice Cheetham (m. 1976)
- Profession: Architect, town planner

John Percival Tate (21 March 1894 – 21 January 1977) was an Australian architect, urban planner and politician. He was born in New Zealand where he trained as an architect and engineer. He moved to Sydney, Australia as a young man and went into private practice, later working for the federal government during World War II. Tate served on the Ryde Municipal Council and Sydney City Council in the 1940s and 1950s. As chairman of the Cumberland City Council he was a key figure behind the Cumberland Plan for Greater Sydney. He also served as a Senator for New South Wales from 1950 to 1953, representing the Liberal Party.

== Early life ==
Tate was born on 21 March 1894 in Wellington, New Zealand. He was the son of English immigrant parents Frances Lillian (née Gormley or Gumley) and Robert Gillies Tate. As a young man he changed his middle name from "Henry" to "Percival". After leaving school, he completed an apprenticeship with Panton & Son, a civil engineering and architectural firm in Timaru.

== Professional career ==
Tate moved to Sydney in about 1920, where he went into partnership with William Auburn Young in the firm of John P. Tate & Young. One of the firms earliest commissions was the Manchester Unity Building on Elizabeth Street (later known as the St James Trust Building), which was designed in 1921 and finished in 1924 as one of the city's first high-rise buildings. Tate "built up a diverse private practice designing aeroplane hangars, theatres and various types of factories". He also supervised the construction of the Port Kembla steelworks in the 1920s. In 1923, his firm was selected to design a refurbishment of the Queen Victoria Building. The Sydney City Council ultimately decided not to continue with the renovations, with Tate & Young suing for breach of contract; they sought £17,448 but ultimately settled for £7,000.

In 1940, Tate joined the Department of the Interior as superintending architect, responsible for defences work programmes in New South Wales. He was appointed state construction manager for the Allied Works Council in 1942, and advised the Chifley government on housing. In 1945, Tate was appointed as the inaugural chairman of the Cumberland County Council, established by the New South Wales state government to prepare a planning scheme for the Greater Sydney area which spanned 69 local government areas. He worked closely with chief planner Sidney Luker to prepare what became known as the Cumberland Plan, which "advocated decentralization, zoning, green belts, open spaces, and improved road and rail systems". It was presented to the state government in 1948, but was not formally adopted until 1951. Tate resigned as chairman in protest at its late adoption, which he described as a "civic tragedy".

In the mid-1950s, Tate returned to private practice as the principal of John P. Tate and Associates. He also served as chairman of AE Goodwin, a shipbuilding and engineering firm. He was elected as a fellow of the Royal Australian Institute of Architects in 1950 and a fellow of the Town and Country Planning Institute of Australia in 1962.

== Politics ==
Tate served on the Ryde Municipal Council from 1944 to 1948 and was chairman of its housing committee. He was also elected to the Sydney City Council in 1947. He was a leader of the Civic Reform Association, serving as an alderman until 1956. He also served on the executive of the Local Government Association of New South Wales.

In May 1949, Tate won preselection for the Liberal Party's Senate ticket in New South Wales at the 1949 federal election. He was elected to a six-year term beginning on 22 February 1950, which was cut short by a double dissolution in 1951. He was re-elected to a three-year term at the 1951 election, but was defeated for preselection by Ken Anderson prior to the 1953 half-Senate election.

=== Positions ===
Tate supported increased immigration and "saw population growth as essential to Australia's economic development and international standing". However, he was concerned about overpopulation in the capital cities and was an advocate of decentralisation, suggesting that immigrants be directed to regional areas. He supported increased autonomy for the Northern Territory as well as the development of New Guinea. Tate also supported electoral reform. He was opposed to proportional representation in the Senate, which had been introduced for the 1949 election, and was "highly critical of the partisan nature of Senate deliberations, which he believed detracted from the chamber’s original role as a States House and a house of review". He suggested that state governments be allowed to directly appoint senators.

== Personal life ==
Tate married Gladys Woodland (née Farquaharson) in 1920, with whom he had three sons. After being widowed in 1974 he remarried in 1976 to Bernice Cheetham with whom he had a son. He moved to Canberra in the same year and died at Canberra Hospital on 21 January 1977.

Government offices
New title	Chairman of the Cumberland County Council; 1945 – 1951	Succeeded by Ronald Stark Luke
