= Sydney Into Its Third Century =

1988 planning document

Sydney into Its Third Century: Metropolitan Strategy for the Sydney Region was a metropolitan planning scheme for Sydney, released in 1988 by Minister for Planning – and future Premier – Bob Carr. The strategy replaced the 1968 Sydney Region Outline Plan (SROP). The new strategy marked a significant break with the past: eliminating major transport infrastructure projects including prospects for rapid transit, emphasising urban densification, and opening up new areas to development far from established mass transport networks.

== Background ==
The Australian Labor Party returned to power with a one-seat Legislative Assembly majority in 1976 after more than a decade in Opposition. The new premier, Neville Wran had promised on the campaign trail to halt inner-city expressway projects. Reservations dating from the 1948 County of Cumberland planning scheme were eliminated and acquired properties sold off, making future completion of the long-planned North Western Expressway and Western Freeway prohibitively expensive. Wran also severely truncated the Eastern Suburbs railway, then under construction.

Displeased with his predecessors' SROP, Wran had it amended in 1980. In 1987, Wran's roads minister, Laurie Brereton, released Roads 2000, described by the government as "a new deal for road users". The plan was the formal replacement of the radial-expressway model of the 1948 and 1968 plans: at its centrepiece was a massive ring road highway. Much of this new road would be built as motorway, but some of which would remain standard arterial road.

Roads 2000 made a virtue of its lack of ambition, citing the environmental benefits of abolishing road reservations, such as the Lane Cove Valley Expressway alignment.

== The new plan ==
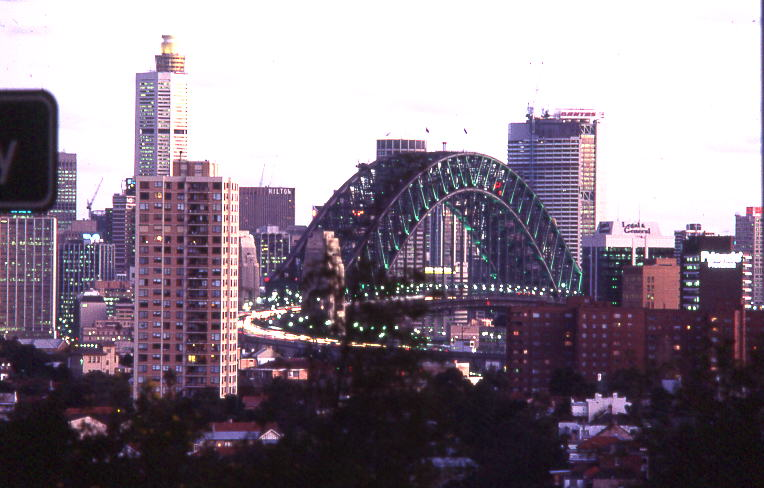
Looking towards the Sydney central business district, 1988.

In 1988 – the city's 200th anniversary – Carr, Wran's planning minister, released a new strategy, called Sydney into Its Third Century. Though it emphasised continuity with the 1948 Cumberland Plan and the 1968 SROP, the 1988 plan represented a major change in strategy. Although Sydney's borders would continue to expand, principally to the west and south-west, the government would explicitly target higher urban density.

Whereas the Cumberland Plan had failed to anticipate high growth, the SROP underestimated urban density: the falling number of people per household. (The footprint earmarked for five million people by 2000 ended up accommodating only four million.) Carr's plan championed a new approach to urban design, characterised by infill development, smaller lots, smaller street frontages, narrower roads and a 20 per cent multi-unit dwelling target. In doing so it represented an early salvo in a debate between local councils and state agencies about development densities that continues to this day.

== New suburbs ==
Sydney into Its Third Century also dropped the 1968 plan's preference for building in corridors alongside the existing rail system. Carr's strategy was to identify the areas within 100 kilometres of Sydney that lacked "primary constraints" on development and release the most promising, with mass transit infrastructure to follow development, rather than precede it.

Thirty-one areas were identified as being free of constraints such as steep terrain, soil hazards, floodplains, conservation reserves and the existing urban footprint. Of these, 21 were selected for planning consideration:

- Rouse Hill–Marsden Park
- Luddenham
- Bringelly
- Cobbitty
- Holsworthy
- Horsley Park
- Cawdor
- Southern Macarthur region
- Picton–Bargo
- Harrington Park
- South Camden
- Londonderry
- Helensburgh
- Scheyville–Maraylya
- Kurrajong–Glossodia
- Yarramundi
- Northern Warringah region
- South Orchard Hills
- Warnervale–Wadalba
- West Menai
- West Gosford

Save for Holsworthy, which had recently gained a new railway station as part of an extension of the East Hills railway line to Glenfield, none of the new areas were near the suburban rail network. (Three were adjacent to the lower-frequency intercity train system, however.) Citing limited resources, Carr committed only to bus services for the new suburbs, with corridors reserved for future transport infrastructure. "The nature of these corridors must be as flexible as possible to allow for a range of options," the plan said. In the two decades that followed, only two of the corridors were actually used for infrastructure: separated bus transitways were opened in 2003 and 2007.

== Transport ==
The orbital road required massive investment: a Sydney Harbour Tunnel (completed 1992), a Castlereagh Expressway (opened in 1997 as the M2 Hills Motorway), a South Western Motorway (completed 2001) and an arterial road link between the Castlereagh and South Western motorways (completed 2005 to motorway standard as Westlink M7).

Beyond this, the principal transport projects in the strategy were:

- upgraded ring roads (currently known as routes A3 and A6)
- corridor reservations for potential mass transit lines (two bus rapid transit lines were built)
- duplication of the Richmond railway line to Riverstone (progressively completed as far as Schofields – the remaining section is still incomplete as at 2015)
- a one-kilometre rail 'y-link' at Harris Park, to allow direct train services between Campbelltown and Parramatta (completed 1996)

The report controversially ignored plans for a rapid transit metro system, despite them being included in the previous strategy from 1968.
