= Sydney Region Outline Plan =

1968 urban plan for Sydney, Australia

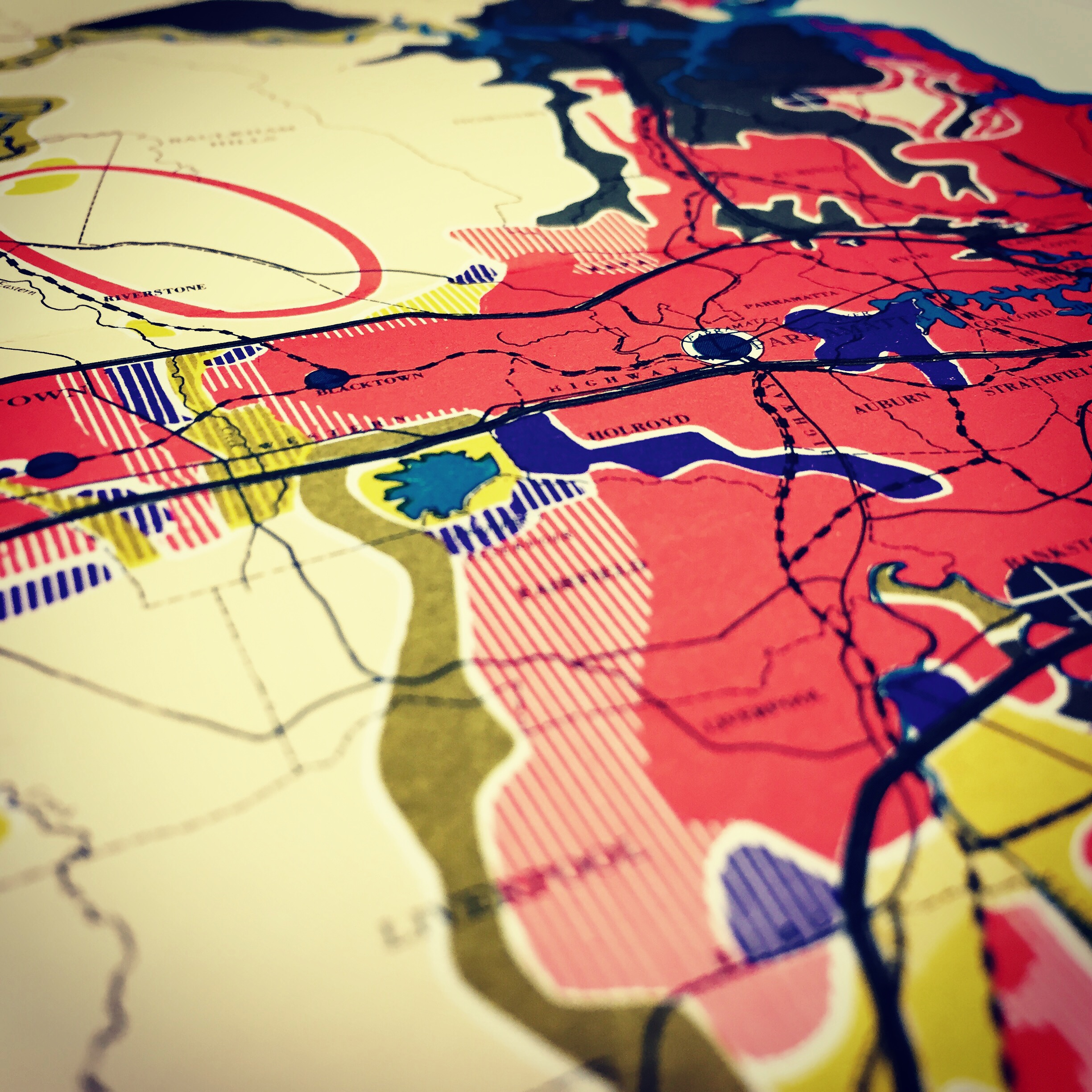
The plan guided the release of land on the city's suburban fringe for 20 years.

The Sydney Region Outline Plan (SROP) was a land use and infrastructure scheme for metropolitan New South Wales released by the State Planning Authority in March 1968. The SROP superseded the 1948 County of Cumberland planning scheme. Whereas the Cumberland scheme echoed contemporary plans for London, the SROP adopted a Scandinavian model of town centres arranged along existing railway corridors.

Although the SROP was replaced long before its 30-year time horizon, and many of its ideas were never put into practice, according to veteran planner Bob Meyer, "the shape of Sydney today is exactly as planned" in 1968. By focusing development on growth corridors along the rail network, the plan "has allowed Sydney to reach a population of 4.5 million people and achieve the highest use of public transport of any Australian city." According to the Dictionary of Sydney, the "Sydney Region Outline Plan set the basic blueprint for metropolitan corridor development in evidence today."

== Failure of the Cumberland scheme ==
The Cumberland planners had correctly anticipated the growth of both demand for low-density suburban living and private motor vehicles by setting aside new residential growth areas and corridors for future expressways. But, 20 years on, other changes were making demands on the urban structure: new energy and communications infrastructure, the containerisation of freight, the emergence of new industries and the growth of air travel. Reflecting the fashion of its time, the Cumberland scheme sought to encircle the Sydney of 1948 with a London-style green belt several kilometres wide, a proposal which did not enjoy widespread support from green belt landowners or State government departments. The green belt was formally abandoned in 1960 under pressure from the Commonwealth, which saw the scheme as a costly impediment to postwar growth. The county council – controlled by representatives of the city's many local councils – was abolished in 1963 and replaced with a new State Planning Authority.

== State Planning Authority ==
The State Planning Authority (SPA) was a NSW Government agency established under the State Planning Authority Act 1963 Commencing operations on 19 December 1963, the SPA replaced the Cumberland and Northumberland county councils, and absorbed the town planning functions of the Department of Local Government.

Initially, the SPA's governing body included nominees of:

- the ministers for Transport and Local Government
- the Commissioner for Main Roads
- the City of Sydney
- the Local Government Association
- the Shires Association.

They were joined by the nominee of a panel on which architects, engineers, surveyors and town planners were represented. Membership was enlarged in 1972 to include additional ministerial and departmental nominees.

In April 1974, the Government merged the SPA with the Department of Environment to form a new Planning and Environment Commission.

== Planning principles ==
The SPA explicitly abandoned the Cumberland scheme's green belt and satellite cities, and devised a Sydney Region Outline Plan 1970–2000 A.D. with reference to seven principles:

1. extend the city along the linear railway corridors
2. a 'grid' of highways to reduce the dominance – and congestion – of the Sydney central business district (CBD)
3. new city centres, each with their own identity, within the larger metropolitan area
4. phasing of development to maximise the use of existing infrastructure before opening up new areas to subdivision
5. reserve multi-purpose utility corridors
6. develop Sydney, Newcastle and Wollongong as "one linear urban complex"
7. create new commercial areas in the suburbs to balance employment across the metropolitan area.

The green belt survived, in much reduced form, as linear parkland from the western expressway reservation west of Prospect Reservoir south of Campbelltown. (The more distant green belt formed by a chain of national parks from Broken Bay to Port Hacking remains to this day.) The planned expressway network, too, was retained and expanded.

== New city centres ==
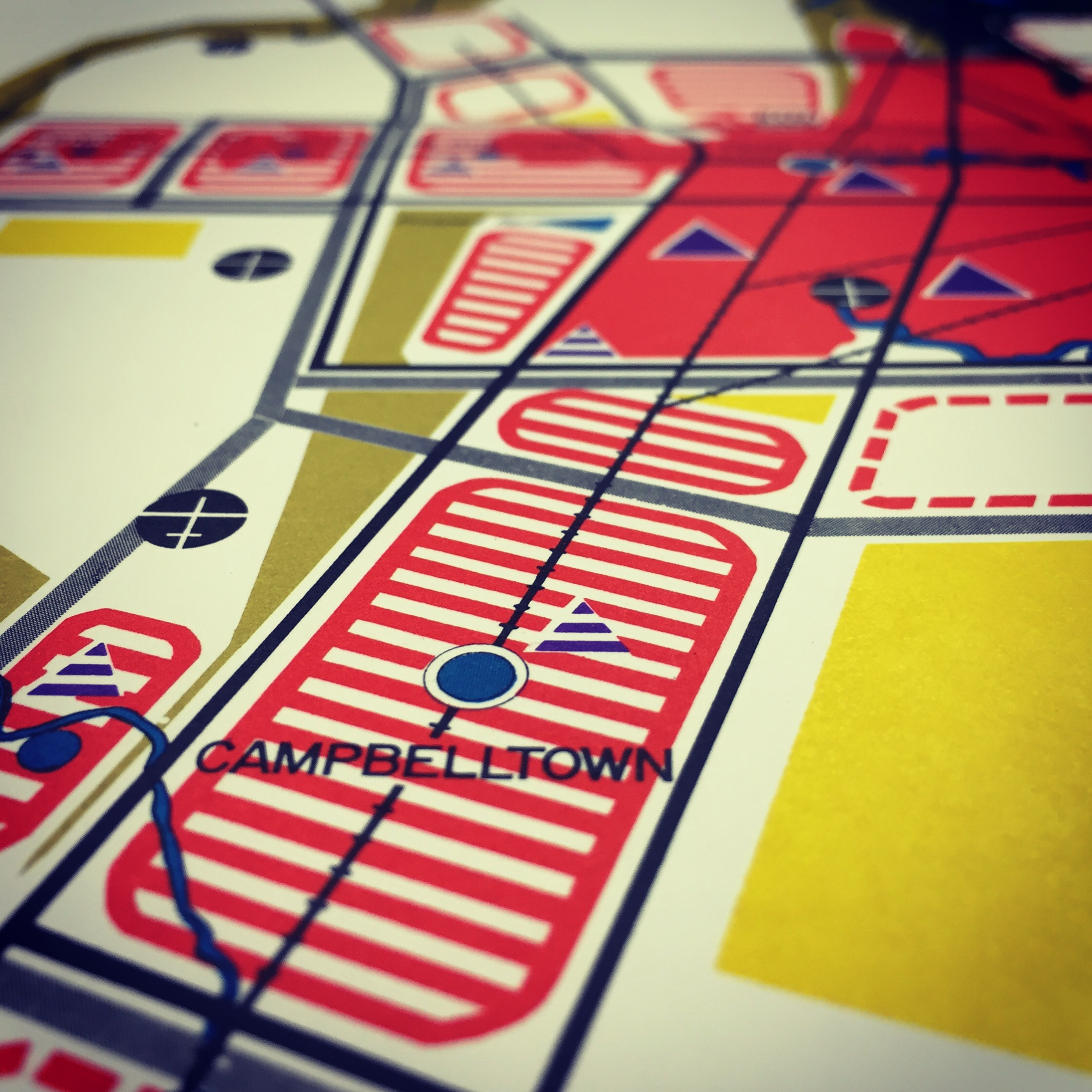
The SROP called for development along the Main South railway line and a major new centre at Campbelltown.

To reduce congestion, the Plan called for new city centres across the metropolitan area, each with its own distinct identity and the full range of inner-city amenities. Two centres were given special prominence: Parramatta, in the geographic centre of the Sydney Basin, and Campbelltown, in the south-west. The rapid growth of Parramatta as a commercial centre would require, in the words of the Plan, "boldness, imagination, vigorous action and the utmost co-operation" between landholders, developers, local and state government. Campbelltown was allocated space for a university, which later became part of the University of Western Sydney.

Other city centres the plan sought to foster were:

- Blacktown, Mount Druitt and Penrith, along the western railway line
- a future site in the "Rouse Hill–Maraylya area" once the area was developed
- Chatswood, to serve the North Shore and Northern Beaches
- Camden and Appin in the south-west.

The SROP required that major commercial and retail developments be sited on the existing railway network, preventing the development of car-dependent standalone shopping malls on the urban fringe. Though initially resisted by the retail sector, this requirement eventually succeeded in integrating malls with town centres.

== New suburbs ==
The plan identified new corridors for development along the main western and southern railway lines. In the longer term, it recommended investigation of new suburbs along the Richmond branch line, at Appin in the Southern Highlands, in the Gosford and Wyong areas, the Forest District and Holsworthy.

== Infrastructure ==
In addition to dedicated utilities corridors, the plan contained an ambitious infrastructure agenda:

- 350 miles of new expressway
- new university campuses at Campbelltown and Penrith
- responding to increased trade and containerisation by shifting more port facilities out of Sydney Harbour, to the northern shore of Port Botany
- expansion of Sydney Airport, including additional land on the Kurnell Peninsula
- a new international airport in the vicinity of Wyong, plus a number of smaller airfields across the city to serve general and freight aviation
- extension of the East Hills railway line from East Hills to connect with the Main South line at Glenfield
- a new railway line from the CBD to the Eastern Suburbs, terminating at the University of New South Wales
- acquisition of more hydrofoils for the harbour ferry network
- establish commuter car parks and bus–rail interchanges, and reorient the bus network to feed passengers onto trains
- a "rapid transit" train system between Penrith, Parramatta and the CBD, with faster, lighter rolling stock running on dedicated tracks.

== Legacy ==
Since World War II the watchword had been 'populate or perish' – but by the middle of the 1970s such sentiments could no longer secure support for major projects. The planners delivering the SROP faced criticism on cost, heritage, environmental and social-policy grounds. The troubled Mount Druitt and Green Valley public housing estates, the contentious demolition of older inner-city homes to build expressways, a deteriorating economy and a more febrile political atmosphere combined to force a rethink of the city's approach to growth.

The Askin government responded in 1974, merging the SPA with the Department of Environment to form a new Planning and Environment Commission, forerunner of today's Department of Planning. The SROP was effectively torn up in 1977, when the Wran Labor government cancelled a slew of major projects and began selling off infrastructure reservations in return for political support from the powerful Green bans movement. A review of metropolitan planning followed in 1980, and a new scheme, Sydney Into Its Third Century, was published in 1988.

Yet much of what the SROP envisaged came to fruition, including much of the motorway network, Western Sydney Parklands, the University of Western Sydney, Port Botany, more integrated public transport services and – in the near future – rapid transit trains and a Second Sydney Airport.

In retrospect, the SROP underestimated urban density and failed to anticipate the falling number of people per household, meaning that the footprint earmarked for five million people by 2000 ended up accommodating only four million. While Chatswood and Parramatta developed into fully-fledged city centres, Campbelltown did not attract the same degree of commercial growth.

== See also ==
- County of Cumberland planning scheme, 1948
- Sydney Into Its Third Century, 1988
- Urban planning of Sydney
