= Newbury principles =

Urban planning guideline

The Newbury Principles collectively refer to an urban planning guideline stating that decisions should be made based only on the planning considerations relevant to the current development, even if the consideration of ulterior purposes may lead to a greater public good. In practice, the principles are used as a test to verify the validity of conditions to be imposed by a planning authority.

Specifically, the decision of the House of Lords in Newbury District Council v Secretary of State for the Environment contains the following three principles when considering the reasonableness of imposing conditions on consents:

1. It must be imposed for a planning purpose.
2. It must fairly and reasonably relate to the development for which permission is being given.
3. It must be reasonable.

== Application in Australian Planning Decisions ==
The Newbury principles are applied in Australia, and have been cited by courts in New South Wales and Western Australia. The Newbury test also remains in general application in the courts of New Zealand.

=== NSW Environmental Planning & Assessment Act 1979 (EP & A Act 1979) ===
The power to impose conditions on development consent in NSW derives from the heads of consideration under S.4.15 of the EP & A Act 1979 (formerly S.79C) and S.4.17 of this Act. The purpose of these provisions is to provide for the various effects of a development consent which commonly arise in the assessment of development applications.

In specific instances it will be for conditions to be explicitly worded by assessment staff to deal with specific issues of impact or ongoing management. To satisfy the Newbury Principles all such conditions must:

- serve a planning purposes;
- be clear, concise and measurable;
- must relate to the development; and
- must be reasonable having regard for the scope of development and must be enforceable (the Wednesbury Principle).

It remains the responsibility of councils to ensure that conditions are imposed having appropriate regard for key planning principles, as contained within relevant planning policies and which do not unreasonably burden the consent holder. In all instances the assessment officers must have regard for the contents of the development application at hand and the requirements of the EP&A Act and the Regulations to ensure that the development will meet legislative requirements.
