= Sydney Inner Metropolitan =

The Sydney Inner Metropolitan may refer to any one of Australia's oldest and most established areas:

- Sydney central business district
- City of Sydney, the Sydney central business district and surrounding inner city suburbs
- Lower North Shore (Sydney) region
- Eastern Suburbs (Sydney) region
- Inner West region
