= County of Cumberland planning scheme =

1948 urban plan in NSW, Australia

The County of Cumberland planning scheme, commonly known as the Cumberland Plan, was a land use and transport strategy developed by the Cumberland County Council in Sydney in 1948 and adopted by the Government of New South Wales in 1951. The plan's key elements were a green belt around Sydney and a radial motorway network, neither of which eventuated on their intended scale.

The Cumberland Plan was developed by the council's chairman John Percival Tate and chief planner Sidney Luker. It "advocated decentralization, zoning, green belts, open spaces, and improved road and rail systems".

Though Sydney had had a comprehensive plan for its railways and a number of planned suburbs, including the city centre itself, the city as a whole had been allowed to grow organically. Suburban development in the early 20th century followed a 'starfish' pattern, closely tied to the railway and tramway lines that radiated from the centre. The McKell Labor government sought to create a framework for rapid metropolitan growth in the postwar period, and legislated in 1944 for the creation of a single Sydney-wide planning authority, governed by representatives of the various local councils. The Cumberland County Council commenced operations in July 1945.

An independent and illustrated account of the preparation of the plan was published by Arthur Winston in 1957. The plan was resisted by NSW Government agencies, landowners and local residents and lost its patron when the county council was abolished in 1963. The plan was eventually superseded by the Sydney Region Outline Plan in 1968.

== The Green Belt ==
The most striking feature of the Plan was a vast green belt to hem in the city's sprawl. Beginning near Pennant Hills, the five-kilometre-wide belt would have curved through Western Sydney, encircling Baulkham Hills, Blacktown, Seven Hills and Liverpool before ending on the banks of the Georges River opposite East Hills. A non-contiguous section would then have covered the western Sutherland Shire, roughly bordered by the Georges River in the north and the Woronora River in the east. Motorists travelling north on the Cumberland Highway would have seen, with a few exceptions around Liverpool and Toongabbie, only green space to their left.

The Green Belt augmented an already extensive national parks system around Sydney, stretching from Royal National Park in the south to Ku-ring-gai Chase National Park in the north.

== Roads ==
The Plan reserved corridors for:

- a north-eastern road, roughly along the alignment of the Warringah Expressway, crossing Middle Harbour and following Wakehurst Parkway and Pittwater Road to Palm Beach
- a northern road, roughly along the alignment of today's Victoria Road, the M2 Hills Motorway and the Pacific Motorway
- a western road, roughly along the alignment of today's M4 Motorway
- a southern road, roughly along the alignment of the F6 corridor, but passing to the west of Sydney Airport
- a south-western road, branching off the southern road near Tempe and roughly following the alignment of today's M5 Motorway
- a ring-road, roughly along the alignment of the A3 ring-road between Macquarie Park in the north and Miranda in the south.

== History ==
Early investigations underpinning the 1951 Plan were in fact undertaken more than a decade earlier by the Department of Main Roads. The investigations were detailed in a report entitled "Main Road Development Plan for Sydney Metropolis and County of Cumberland - Part 1 Investigations Relating to the Present and Future Extent and Pattern of the Metropolis" (DMR, 1940).

The DMR commenced surveys of land use, population densities and traffic flows in 1943. In 1945, it issued a report titled the "County of Cumberland Main Road Development Map". When the Cumberland County Council was formed in 1946, it used some of the data collected by the DMR.

The Cumberland County Council plan did not differ greatly from that produced by DMR. The Main Road Development Plan "formed, with some small amendments, an important part of the Master Plan" prepared by the Cumberland County Council. The DMR's road planning "required little alteration" and was "apparently incorporated with little alteration" into the Cumberland County Council's plan in 1948.

The draft plan prompted nearly 3500 objections.

== See also ==
- Sydney Region Outline Plan, 1968
- Urban planning of Sydney
- 1955 Plan for the Metropolitan Region, Perth and Fremantle
