= Employment zone =

Employment Zones were areas within the UK designated as such to 'loosen restrictions' and requirements on government assistance in job acquisition. Those living in Employment Zones were able to get financial assistance to set up in business, improve their skills or even buy clothes for a job interview. The zones were managed by the Department for Work and Pensions.

== Employment Zones ==
Fifteen areas across the UK were classified as Employment Zones. Typically, private sub-contractors would bid for workfare contracts for the designated areas blighted by long-term unemployment.

The following companies were classed as Employment Zones providers:
Reed in Partnership PLC
Pertemps Employment Alliance Ltd
Working Links (Employment) Ltd
The Wise Group
Pelcombe Training Ltd
Ingeus (formerly Work Directions UK Ltd)
TNG Workzone

=== Criticism of Employment Zones ===
Variant magazine published an article discussing Employment Zones.
A.W.o.L. - an independent unemployed group in Brighton and Hove - was set up in response to the creation of an Employment Zone.
