= Housing Delivery Authority =

Government agency in New South Wales, Australia

Agency overview
- Formed: 18 December 2024
- Jurisdiction: New South Wales, Australia
- Headquarters: Parramatta Square, Darcy Street, Parramatta NSW
- Minister responsible: Paul Scully, Minister for Planning
- Agency executive: Simon Draper, Chair
- Parent department: Department of Planning, Housing and Infrastructure
- Key document: Environmental Planning and Assessment Act 1979 (NSW)
- Website: Housing Delivery Authority on the NSW Department of Planning website

The Housing Delivery Authority (HDA) is an agency of the New South Wales state government in Australia. It was created to meet New South Wales's commitments under the National Housing Accord to develop 377,000 new homes by July 2029. It is part of a broad housing reform agenda including premier Chris Minns' decisions to rezone areas to allow for greater density of residences in high-demand areas and ranking councils based on frequency of housing approvals in addition to his plan to rezone Woollahra railway station to allow for new homes next to a transport corridor.

The Housing Delivery Authority allows for the government to bypass the authority of local councils to block planning decisions by declaring a development as state significant. The government has stated that the Housing Delivery Authority will shave off one year from a development proposal to a new build. The application process is available for new developments that are valued of at least $60 million (about 100 or more homes) in Greater Sydney and approximately $30 million for regional areas of New South Wales, which builds about 40 or more homes. The minister for planning and public spaces, Paul Scully, retains full control of which projects to approve or reject.

== History ==
The Housing Delivery Authority was created in December 2024 to enable New South Wales to keep pace with the state's target of 377,000 new dwellings by 2029 under the National Housing Accord amid a lack of housing, leading to higher prices for existing stock.

Since November 2025, the Housing Delivery Authority has been enshrined in legislation rather than a ministerial order as was the case previously. This was part of amendments to the state's Environmental Planning and Assessment Act 1979.

In May 2026, The Sydney Morning Herald reported that the commercial zones in Parramatta, North Sydney and the Sydney CBD would be made exempt from the HDA pathway.

=== Impact ===
The Sydney Morning Herald has estimated that 300 projects have been recommended for fast-tracking by the Housing Delivery Authority and they have assessed 609 projects in total since February 2025.

The Australian Financial Review estimated in February 2025 that 6,500 new homes across 11 developments will be fast-tracked following a decision by the Housing Delivery Authority. The areas targeted include Rhodes, North Parramatta, Canada Bay, Westmead, Ryde, Leppington, Austral, Parramatta, Miranda and Waterloo. The Housing Delivery Authority aims to approve 100 projects by the end of 2025 and has received 160 expressions of interest since January, which the Australian Financial Review estimates to equal 100,000 new homes.

In December 2025, the New South Wales government announced that the minister for planning had approved the first lot of homes to be built under recommendations made by the agency.

By June 2026, the Housing Delivery Authority had recommended the approval of 124,000 homes, including high-density apartment buildings. Most homes have been centred around the North Sydney, Lane Cove, Parramatta, Canada Bay, Burwood and Ryde council areas.

== Membership ==
The agency is currently staffed by at least four people. These are the secretary of the premier's department Simon Draper, the secretary of the department of planning Kiersten Fishburn, and the chief executive officer of Infrastructure NSW, Tom Gellibrand; the agency also had Aoife Wynter on its staff as executive director of panels and housing delivery but was forced to leave her position for using artificial intelligence (AI) to take action on consequential decisions. Fishburn, Gellibrand and Draper are the main decision-makers within the agency.

== Reception ==
=== Criticism ===
Shortly after the agency was announced in December 2024, Local Government NSW president Darriea Turley stated that the Housing Delivery Authority would be a "Christmas gift to developers" and remove the community's voice from inputs on decisions regarding housing developments.

Member of federal parliament for the seat of Wentworth in the Eastern Suburbs of Sydney Allegra Spender has said that AI should be used where possible in planning decisions, pushing back against the agency for suspending Wynter for using her husband's AI software to make decisions.

Various councils such as Hills Shire mayor Michelle Byrne have criticised the agency's work in fast-tracking development proposals, she said "it feels good at the time, but they're not thinking about the consequences". City of Sydney lord mayor Clover Moore has also criticised the agency, saying it will allow "poor quality homes that will blight Sydney for generations to come", she also criticised the agency for not considering residents' needs and a lack of transparency.

=== Praise ===
The Property Council of Australia has congratulated the Housing Delivery Authority for recommending fast-tracking of 12 projects worth 6,855 new homes, they also made mention of the location of new houses being a key consideration.

== Related agency ==
The Investment Delivery Authority is a similar agency to the Housing Delivery Authority. It is composed of four members, those being: Simon Draper, secretary of the treasury department of the New South Wales government Michael Coutts-Trotter, Kiersten Fishburn, and Tom Gellibrand. Funding to accelerate the creation of the agency came in the 2025 New South Wales state government budget.

It was established by a memorandum issued by the premier's department. The minister for planning, treasurer, and the minister for industry and trade collectively have control over approving recommendations by the Investment Delivery Authority.

Applications for fast-tracked funding have come from data centres, technology projects, renewable energy projects, energy security projects, and hotels. To apply for fast-tracked funding under a recommendation from this agency, a project needs to be valued at $1 billion or more. Hospitality projects such as hotels need to be valued at $200 million or more to apply for fast-tracked funding. The Infrastructure Delivery Authority has a goal of bringing forward 30 large projects along with $50 billion of development annually. The Investment Delivery Authority requires that projects start construction in a fast timeframe.

The Investment Delivery Authority's work is supported by a multi-agency taskforce within Investment NSW.

The minister for innovation, science and technology, Anoulack Chanthivong, has praised the agency for being able to fund the growth of Tech Central, a conglomerate of multiple sites across inner Sydney. Businessman Mike Cannon-Brookes is a proponent of the Tech Central project. The project was also funded through a $38.5 million grant in the 2025 New South Wales budget.

=== Reception ===
The announcement of the Investment Delivery Authority has been warmly received by Business NSW, the Committee for Sydney, and the Property Council of Australia.
