= Environmental Planning and Assessment Act 1979 =

Law in New South Wales

Parliament of New South Wales
- Long title: An Act to institute a system of environmental planning and assessment for the State of New South Wales.
- Citation: Environmental Planning and Assessment Act 1979 (NSW)
- Passed by: Parliament of New South Wales
- Passed: 22 November 1979
- Assented to by: Governor Roden Cutler
- Assented to: 21 December 1979
- Administered by: Department of Planning and Environment

Legislative history
- Bill title: Environmental Planning and Assessment Bill 1979
- Introduced by: William Haig
- Introduced: 13 November 1979
- Status: Amended

The Environmental Planning and Assessment Act 1979 is an Act of the New South Wales Parliament.

== History ==
In September 2025, Chris Minns' Labor government signalled their intention to significantly amend the legislation, with the legislation now including the government's existing Housing Delivery Authority and a new Development Coordination Authority.

== Controversy over part 3A ==
The Act gained considerable controversy with the introduction of section 3A that effectively allowed the Planning Minister to declare a project as of "State significance" and assume direct approval delegation. Although it was introduced to streamline the planning process and fast track the assessment of large infrastructure projects, a public perception of its misuse was a significant factor in the defeat of the Keneally government.

== Part 4 ==
Part 4 of the Act includes provisions which allow proponents to lodge development applications to seek consent to carry out development under the Act.

== See also ==
- Environment of Australia
- Environmental planning
