= Greater Sydney Commission =

Former New South Wales government agency

The Greater Cities Commission (formerly the Greater Sydney Commission) was an independent agency of the New South Wales Government responsible for land use planning across the Six Cities Region in New South Wales, Australia. The agency was brought into effect through the Greater Cities Commission Act 2022 which stipulated the composition of the agency and its responsibilities. The Greater Cities Commission was created for Greater Sydney, Central Coast, Newcastle and Wollongong. The objectives of the commission were to act on housing supply issues (including a diversity of housing types), to promote sustainable and environmentally-friendly development, to support housing that fosters productivity liveability and environmental quality, to provide First Nations people with opportunities in their local area, to promote economic activity, and to act on other issues surrounding land use.

== History ==
=== Greater Sydney Commission ===
Under minister for planning, Pru Goward, the Greater Sydney Commission was announced in parallel with A Plan for Growing Sydney in December 2014 and formally empowered with the passing of the Greater Sydney Commission Act 2015 under minister for planning Rob Stokes. The commission was established to unify and improve strategic spatial planning for the metropolitan area of Sydney, Australia. The commission was led by Lucy Turnbull as chief commissioner from 2015 until her resignation in March 2020. The role of chief commissioner was subsequently held by Geoff Roberts, previously the deputy chief commissioner.

=== Formation of Greater Cities Commission ===
In December 2021, NSW Premier Dominic Perrottet announced intentions for a new Cities ministry to oversee a region of 'Six Cities' encompassing Greater Sydney, the Central Coast, Newcastle, and Wollongong. Subsequently, the Greater Cities Commission Act 2022 came into force, creating a new regional agency known as the Greater Cities Commission, and repealing the Greater Sydney Commission Act 2015. The reformed Commission oversaw a broadened remit encompassing the Six Cities Region: incorporating the Eastern Harbour City, the Central River City, and Western Parkland City districts introduced under the Metropolis of Three Cities Plan as well as the Central Coast City, the Lower Hunter and Newcastle City, and the Illawarra-Shoalhaven City.

== Dissolution ==
In June 2023, the newly elected Minns government announced that the staff of the Greater Cities Commission would be folded back into the Department of Planning and Environment. The commission was legally dissolved on 1 January 2024, with its strategic planning functions absorbed by the new Department of Planning, Housing and Infrastructure and some other functions reverting to Investment NSW and the Office of Health and Medical Research.
