= Alexandria to Moore Park Project =

Road widening project in Sydney, Australia

The Alexandria to Moore Park Project (Note: Previously known as the Alexandria to Moore Park Connector or Alexandria to Moore Park Connectivity Upgrade) (A2MP) was a proposed east-west arterial road widening project to increase traffic capacity through the City of Sydney suburbs of Alexandria and Waterloo. Originally announced in 2016, on 27 October 2026 Transport for NSW announced the project would not proceed and they did not plan to further develop the proposal. The status of Stage 1 features, such as the Botany Road and McEvoy Street intersection (major design feature 4) and the Lachlan Street widening, is unclear.

The plans extended from Sydney Park in the west to Moore Park in the east, utilising Euston Road, McEvoy Street, a realigned intersection at Bourke Road, Lachlan Street and Dacey Avenue. In 2019, the Sydney Morning Herald reported plans were scaled back due to heavy opposition. The December 2016 and June 2017 Community Updates remained the ultimate design to be delivered in stages.

The NSW February 2026 Department of Planning, Housing & Infrastructure Infrastructure Opportunities Plan stated intersection upgrades at McEvoy Street and Botany Road were Funded for delivery by Transport for NSW, with completion expected in 2026. A2MP was part of the TfNSW Network Integration program (Note: Project New M5 (M8) - Alexandria to Moore Park - Stage 1, is under WestConnex Planning Condition E40 b) iii), with Description To address increased traffic flows from St Peters Interchange to the east (and vice versa) for M8 generated traffic until M4/M5 link opens.), which was renamed from WestConnex Enabling works.

The project has been covered in detail by the Sydney Morning Herald, Daily Telegraph, South Sydney Herald, and The Beast. There is also considerable Sydney Morning Herald coverage of past proposals for the corridor.

== Purpose ==
The road capacity upgrade was planned to accommodate large numbers of vehicles exiting WestConnex, and stage 1 was carried out under WestConnex planning condition E40 b iii. In 2017, Roads & Maritime Services (RMS) stated traffic would surge, partly due by WestConnex, over 50% in the 4 years to 2021. Traffic forecasts were used to justify more lanes and larger intersections making up the project. It was estimated to cost at least $1 billion. RMS argued the third WestConnex stage from Haberfield to St Peters would "take traffic away from this corridor" in 2023.

The Stage 1 Review of Environmental Factors stated the primary purpose of the project was to "Improve intersection performance". The 2019 Review of Environmental Factors stated if no changes were made, "average speeds on the local network are expected to decrease by 20 to 30 per cent in peak periods by 2021." The average bus speed along the corridor was forecast to decrease 15% in peak times by 2021, with reliability and delay impacts for bus routes along Botany Road, Bourke Street and Elizabeth Street.

Planning documents state the road capacity improvements are required to reduce congestion and prepare for an increase in traffic, and to "improve traffic flow and road safety along the road corridor".

In November 2017, RMS stated traffic would surge over 50% in the 4 years to 2021. In November/December 2019, RMS predicted travel times when travelling from the west to the east would increase by 40%. The April 2020 Submissions Report claimed that if there were no changes, average speeds on the road network were expected to decrease by 20 to 30 per cent in peak periods by 2021.

== Project stages ==
In December 2016, the Sydney Morning Herald stated the state government was set to announce a major road upgrade to the road corridor. Road planners wanted to "improve traffic flows between the exit and entry ramps to WestConnex near Sydney Park at St Peters". The NSW Government had committed $5.2 million to planning intersection upgrades as of December 2016.

The proposal was supported by Duncan Gay and opposed by Matt Thistlethwaite, Alex Greenwich, Ron Hoenig, Marjorie O'Neill, Jenny Leong and Clover Moore. Randwick Labor councillors stated councillors across Randwick, Waverley and Woollahra "mobilised" against the plan. Action for Public Transport opposed the continuous flow intersection.

42 properties, including 9 residential properties, were to be affected by the project under the preliminary design.

The project proposed a 12 lane continuous-flow intersection with an estimated cost of $500 million, which would be the largest non-motorway intersection in New South Wales.

In December 2016 "Consultation on strategic corridor" was undertaken. In June 2017 the preliminary concept design was displayed. In October 2017 the Community Consultation Report was released.

In March 2017, local media stated "there is an immediate need for transparency and detailed information."

In August 2017, the South Sydney Herald reported RMS told residents it expects population growth to use up the extra capacity within 10 years.

In October 2017, Alex Greenwich requested details about the project in the NSW Legislative Assembly, however in November he was directed to the RMS website.

The business case for the project was expected to be completed in 2017.

In May 2017, contractors began destroying at least 70 trees to widen Euston Road.

In April 2017, the Community Consultation Report was released. The project team was considering one way streets at Botany Road and Wyndham Streets (extending the Southern Arterial Route) in April 2017.

In April 2018, Marjorie O’Neill called for a moratorium on the proposal until there was consultation with affected councils.

=== Stage 1 (2019) ===
In July 2019, a decision to deliver the project in stages was made.

The Sydney Morning Herald reported the plans for the project were scaled back due to resident concerns and "some really strong views" from the City of Sydney Council. Clover Moore was "very pleased" that Transport for NSW was rethinking the scope of the project. The preferred concept design for the project was planned to be released in late 2019.

In November 2019, RMS released the Review of Environmental Factors for the "Alexandria to Moore Park Stage 1 Project". The City of Sydney "considered that the REF contained a poor justification for the proposal". The number of lanes on Lachlan Street was proposed to double.

Stage 1 was carried out under WestConnex planning condition E40 b iii, and was found to have "Neutral" "Compliance with planning condition" and "Neutral" "Alignment of movement and place". WestConnex M8 (New M5) Conditions of Approval E40 stated at 12 months and 5 years after the commencement of operation (of the New M5), the state roads department "must prepare a Road Network Performance Review Plan" including "Euston Road, between Sydney Park Road and Botany Road" (E40 B iii)

==== Botany Road and McEvoy Street Intersection Upgrade ====
At Botany Road and McEvoy Street, the Alexandra to Moore Park Project forms an intersection with the proposed Southern Arterial Route.

Improving the intersection at Botany Road and McEvoy Street was "Major design feature 4" of in the November 2019 Stage 1 REF. The proposal aim was to "Improving intersection capacity".

In response to feedback from the June 2017 concept design, Transport for NSW made "Amendments to the "Wyndham Street and Botany Road intersection configuration" to reduce the impact to bordering properties.

In 2023, $13.5 million of funding was allocated for upgrading this intersection. Ron Hoenig claimed the project to increase intersection capacity would ease traffic induced by WestConnex, stating "These improvements at McEvoy Street and Botany Road will help to ease traffic gridlock that is already taking a toll on Waterloo and Alexandria as a result of WestConnex."

As of September 2023, the project was in the planning and design stage. The project was to be delivered to completion by June 2026.

The NSW Department of Planning, Housing and Infrastructure Infrastructure Opportunities Plan, published 26 February 2026, stated "intersection upgrades at McEvoy Street and Botany Road" were "Funded for delivery" by Transport for NSW, with completion expected in 2026. The contract with Arup Group for the detailed design of the intersection has been extended multiple times, (Note: See archive.org snapshots) and as of June was due to be conclude at the end of July 2026 with an amount payable of $2,195,737.97. As of September 2026, the contract was due to be completed at the end of October with the same amount payable.

The intersection is documented in the Accelerated Infrastructure Fund (AIF). As of March 2026, the AIF states the "Improvment [sic] work at McEvoy Street and Botany Road." work as part of the "McEvoy Street and Botany Road, Waterloo intersection improvements" has received $13.5m of grant funding, has a co-contribution amount of $4.5m, has a total project cost of $18m, and has a "Total dwellings supported" value of 10,000. As of September 2026, the round 3 (tranche 2) project is in construction with an estimated completion of 2028.

As of July 2026 the project was added to the Transport Infrastructure Projects Pipeline. Construction procurement was confirmed for Q4 2026 to Q2 2027, with construction confirmed from Q3 2027 to Q4 2028.

Traffic modelling published in 2019 predicted that morning peak delays at the intersection would reduce due to intersection changes, afternoon peak delays would increase if the proposal was implemented. (Note: "Table 6-12 Summary of current and future intersection performance (Arup, 2019)", "Table 6-12, shows that for future morning and afternoon peak, the proposal would improve intersection performance.") The Traffic Impact Assessment stated the "2021 without Project" traffic volumes were "impacted by latent demand due to upstream congestion."

Near the Botany Road/McEvoy street intersection is an area with historical archaeological potential, in an area formerly occupied by the St Silas School and Church. A section 139 excavation permit would be required from the NSW Heritage Division. St. Silas's Church of England was built about 1858. St. Silas' Church was the "rendervous of the suburban Celestials". The Anglican Church of St James (in Beaconsfield) was originally attached to this church.

The Stage 1 EIS found this intersection upgrade would directly impact 3 mature trees.

On 10 September 2026, Clover Moore wrote to Jenny Aitchison to request reconsideration of the Botany Road Bus Lane and McEvoy Street Intersection Upgrade., and also wrote to John Graham in September. She claimed the Transport Impact Assessment for the latest proposal for Botany Road does not make a compelling case for spending, and was concerned the Transport for NSW Network Operations Team was operating in isolation from broader Government of New South Wales objectives.

The Botany Road and McEvoy Street intersection and bus corridor improvements project was first published on 14 September 2026. Transport for NSW conducted its initial community engagement to help finalise the design in September. Transport for NSW was not required to conduct consultation, however sought feedback in September.

Clover Moore criticised the project as a road-widening project pursued under the guise of bus improvements.

==== Lachlan Street improvements ====
In October 2026, Transport for NSW announced the Lachlan Street improvements project under the Network Efficiency Program. (Note: The Network Efficiency Program page was updated on October 7.) This project includes widening on the south side of Lachlan Street. Transport for NSW stated the merge of two lanes into one creates a pinch point that can affect traffic flow and safety.

== Impact ==
=== Traffic ===
The McEvoy Street and Lachlan Street arterial route is currently capacity constrained at a number of intersections.

A 2018 traffic study predicted additional traffic capacity created by the project "has the potential to reduce demand on lower-order east-west corridors through the Waterloo Precinct such as Henderson Road, Raglan Street and Wellington Street." It found congestion at the McEvoy Street approach to Botany Road would be slightly improved by opening vehicle access to Pitt Street from McEvoy Street. The proposed design was "developed in conjunction with RMS, including members of the Alexandria to Moore Park Connectivity Upgrade project team."

=== Road Widening ===
Construction of the Alexandria to Moore Park Project would require the "bulldozing" of homes and businesses from Alexandria to Waterloo. There is an existing road widening order on the corridor which has been in place for many years.

Road widening for the project would remove over 100 trees.

Under the 2016/2017 proposal, 42 properties (including 9 residential properties) were to be affected by the project under the preliminary design. The Moore Park View Hotel (at Lachlan and South Dowling streets) was one of the properties planned for possible acquisition in late 2017.

Transport for NSW stated in the Stage 1 Submissions Report "It is well known that the Sydney road network has a significant amount of latent / suppressed demand and that increasing capacity will only improve vehicle travel times for a short period". It also claimed reducing travel times and congestion "would help manage the anticipated increase in traffic volumes along the corridor including through better performance at key intersections used by bus routes".

=== Public Transport ===
While consideration was requested, dedicated bus lanes and "Reallocation of road space for public transport priority at key intersections along the corridor" were considered outside the scope of the project. The report stated road space reallocation would instead be considered as part of planning for "new major transport projects" such as the Waterloo Metro station or Eastern Transit Corridor. The report pointed out "There is no bus route that travels along the full extent east-west extent of the proposal area."

=== Speed limit ===
The Alexandria to Moore Park project proposed to increase speed limits to 60 km/h.

In August 2018, the City of Sydney was urging the state government to implement a 40 km/h speed limit across the A2MP project.

Following a review in 2019, Transport for NSW reduced the speed limit from 60 km/h to 50 km/h along the proposed route.

TfNSW stated in April 2020 they would initiate a review to reduce the speed limit to 40 km/h after the opening of the New M5 and St Peters Interchange (WestConnex) "to support the government’s commitment to Vision Zero."

The WestConnex M8 opened in July 2020.

The speed limit changes in November 2024 that included "St Peters and Alexandria" excluded the state roads making up A2MP. As of March 2026, speed limits along the corridor remain 50 km/h.

=== McEvoy Street and Lachlan Street intersection ===
An intersection redesign at McEvoy and Lachlan Streets was proposed. In December 2016, RMS was developing designs to upgrade the intersection to improve traffic flows "between the WestConnex portal at Sydney Park and South Dowling Street". City of Sydney staff expressed concern to the RMS "about the impact of the widening of the intersection".

Roads & Maritime Services services purchased land (Note: Lot 11 DP 1112470, with address 1-9 Lachlan Street, Waterloo) at the corner of Lachlan and Bourke Streets in 2007. The land contained 44 trees. Approximately 2,200 square metres of the Dahua site (with Sydney Water heritage buildings) is zoned for arterial road reservation in the 2012 Sydney LEP. The Majesty Properties site at 230-234 McEvoy Street also has a reservation.

As of 2010, there were "no RMS plans to realign Lachlan Street in the short term".

Thrive Early Learning Centre Waterloo directly outlooks the park which will be removed when the intersection is realigned. As of 2014, it was stated RMS plans to realign Lachlan Street in the medium to long term, and that this "could cause safety concerns with vehicles travelling relatively close" to the childcare centre. No detailed RMS drawings were available.

Outside the Sydney Gate Childcare Centre, tree removal will be required. Obligations for this development to build a footpath through the park for a future alignment were removed. Conditions for tree removal were stated in an August 2024 letter.

== History ==
There have been a number of proposals for road widening or expressways along the project corridor.

=== County of Cumberland planning scheme (1951) ===
The County of Cumberland planning scheme included an arterial road along the McEvoy Street corridor, from Newtown station to Anzac Parade.

Early investigations for the 1951 Plan were undertaken more than a decade earlier by the Department of Main Roads.

The City of Sydney Planning Scheme (1958) was implemented to support the County scheme. The zoning map of the 1958 City of Sydney Planning Scheme includes a brown ("County Roads") line along McEvoy Street, but did not include a realigned intersection at Bourke Street.

=== "East-west" expressway (1961) ===
The 1961 De Leuw Cather (DLC) Geometric Design Study proposed a new "east-west" route, similar to the 1974 Midwestern Expressway, to take pressure off the proposed (and unbuilt) Ultimo Interchange.

This proposal included an interchange at the approximate location of Rozelle Interchange and an interchange at the approximate location of Enmore Road / Stanmore Road / Edgeware Road. The expressway was proposed approximately from Victoria Road at Darling Street, intersecting with the Western Expressway west of Haberfield (approximately at the present day Wattle Street Offramp of the M4), through the new interchange (approximately Enmore Road / Stanmore road / Edgeware Road), intersecting the Southern Expressway east of the current Sydney Park Road and Euston Road intersection, crossing the Green Square station intersection, crossing the intersection at Alison Road and Anzac Parade, and approximately following Lang Road terminating at Syd Einfield Drive. (Note: Map titled "Revised Study Network".)

In the 1960s, the government contracted De Leuw, Cather & Company to design an overpass at the intersection of Anzac Parade, Alison Road, Dacey Avenue and Martin Road. The consultants did not include detailed design of the bridges. This intersection may have been in the Department of Main Roads 10 year plan for the 1960s. This intersection was later the site of the proposed continuous-flow intersection.

=== Midwestern Highway (Sydney Area Transportation Study, 1974) ===
The Sydney Area Transportation Study (SATS) recommended "Dacey Avenue/Lachlan Street/McEvoy Street/Copeland Street/Swanson Street" route be developed to a "major regional road standard with six traffic lanes" from Anzac Parade to King Street, Newtown, as work to be done 1975-2000.

SATS also recommended development of the "Midwestern Highway", a "major artery" including a segment from Alexandria to Anzac Parade. It was to connect from the Johnston's Creek Route to Anzac Parade with 4 through lanes of expressway standard. It was suggested this section was phased from 1991 to 2000. Roads recommended in the general location for this route included Erskineville Road, Swanson, Copeland, Fountain, McEvoy and Lachlan Streets and Dacey Avenue.

=== Pak Poy and Kneebone Consulting traffic study (1981) ===
A 1981 traffic study recommended the function of existing arterial routes (Princes Highway, Botany Road and Mitchell Road/McEvoy Street) be "reinforced" in preference to the development of new freeway systems.

=== Traffic and Transport in South Sydney (1981) ===
A 1981 report suggested a route following O'Dea Avenue and Allen Street to link with McEvoy Street/Euston Road as preferred to upgrading McEvoy Street to an arterial road. The report found McEvoy Street was a major barrier for access to Waterloo Oval.

=== Pyrmont-Alexandria Traffic Management Proposal (1987) ===
As part of the (dismissed, but as built) "Wyndham Street Residents' Alternative", the EIS for the Pyrmont-Alexandria Traffic Management Proposal included "...To maximise efficiency at the Botany Road/McEvoy Street intersection, the proposed widening of McEvoy Street between Wyndham Street and Botany Road would be part of this alternative".

=== 1996 RTA Study ===
In 1996 the Roads & Traffic Authority sponsored a study to identify future road network needs in South Sydney and Mascot. It recommended a route between Randwick and Tempe which included Dacey Avenue and McEvoy Street, and intersected Anzac Parade, the Eastern Distributor, the Southern Arterial Route, and the Princes Highway/M5 East.

=== South Sydney Local Environmental Plan (1998) ===
The South-Sydney Local Environmental Plan (LEP) is a document outlining zoning in the South Sydney area. The plan included an arterial road reservation, including a realigned Bourke Street intersection.

=== Green Square Town Centre Masterplan (2003/2004) ===
The Green Square Town Centre (GSTC) Masterplan recommended the east-west arterial route of Lachlan and McEvoy Streets be constructed between South Dowling Street and Elizabeth Street as a medium term recommendation (along with the extension of the Southern Arterial Route).

Long term recommendations of the report included "Completion of the east-west arterial route from Anzac Parade to Princes Highway" and upgrading the intersection of Lachlan Street and South Dowling Street.

A "New East-West Relief Route" was discussed, which would travel from "Botany Road to Bourke Street to relieve pressure due to Green Square generated traffic on the Botany Road / Bourke Street intersection." The report considered this route a critical element of the Green Square road system.

The report claimed the South Sydney Section 94 Contributions Plan 2003 (South Sydney Council) included $5,140,000 for such an east-west route.

The report included that the City of Sydney council may not support the road proposals "recommended in order to accommodate increased vehicular trips".

==== Zetland Area Traffic Study (2003) ====
The Zetland Area Traffic Study (Note: Also known as the Zetland Traffic Study) was part of The Green Square Town Centre (GSTC) Masterplan. It was being finalised and was scheduled to be reported in November 2004.

The Zetland Area Traffic Study recommended the upgrading of the Lachlan Street / McEvoy Street state arterial route. It stated the highest priority section was between Elizabeth Street and South Dowling Street.

=== McEvoy Street Arterial Route (2008) ===
A May 2008 development assessment named a "McEvoy Street Arterial Route" as a "Future Traffic Arrangement" (alongside a Southern Arterial Route extension). It stated "A scheme has been identified to develop the McEvoy Street route to provide an arterial link between the Eastern Distributor/Anzac Parade and the Princes Highway at St Peters, however there is no program for this work at the present time".
