= Southern Arterial Route =

Arterial road corridor in Sydney, Australia

Southern Arterial Route New South Wales
- One-way pair through Ultimo, Chippendale, Redfern and Waterloo
- 1987 EIS proposed Southern Arterial Route (Overpass Turbo map, derived from EIS map)

General information
- Type: Road
- Opened: 1987–1992

The Southern Arterial Route is a proposed and partly implemented arterial road corridor in inner city Sydney, New South Wales, Australia.

Conceived in the 1970s and 1980s after a cancelled urban expressway scheme, the arterial corridor was partially implemented in the 1980s-1990s as a high capacity one-way pair through the now high-density suburbs of Ultimo, Chippendale, Redfern and Waterloo.

The current route design as a paired one-way road system was first formally detailed in the 1987 Environmental Impact Statement for the Department of Main Roads Pyrmont - Alexandria traffic management proposal, though there were similar proposals in 1969 and 1983.

The project attracted significant community opposition and remains incomplete, with later proposals either to extend the arterial south or remove it (revert it to two-way operation). Only two of three stages were completed due to strong community opposition. Stage 1 covered Ultimo to St Paul's Place / Cleveland Street. Stage 2 was originally planned to connect St Paul's Place / Cleveland Street to Bourke Road, Alexandria, however, was only completed to Henderson Road. Stage 3 was cancelled in 1993.

The 1993 Citizen's Response summary stated "if people count, Stage 3 of the Southern Arterial will not be built", and "on the same grounds, Stage 2 will be undone or significantly modified." It recommended that "Ideally we need a solution to the problems of Stage 2 which does not involve the evils of Stage 3."

In the decades since there have been numerous proposals (or references to unpublished proposals) to extend the one-way pair further south, or partially revert it to two-way operation. Parallel underground motorways, heavy rail and metro lines have been completed since the original proposal.

Directly adjacent to the arterial route, Waterloo station opened in 2024, and the Waterloo renewal project will build over 3,000 new apartments. By 2030, Green Square to the south of the corridor will be the densest urban area in Australia.

The Sydney Morning Herald has covered the project in detail, with articles covering the project proposals, road opening, residents, council and editorial backlash, views by political figures, on funding announcements or mentions in passing.

== Route ==
The current route is a One-way pair from Pyrmont to Waterloo.

In the southbound direction, this route takes Harris Street, Regent Street, and Botany Road. In the northbound direction, the route takes Henderson Road, Wyndham Street, Gibbons Street, Regent Street, Cleveland Street, Abercrombie Street and Wattle Street.

At Regent Street north of Cleveland Street, the route combines into a two-way road and later splits again.

At Henderson Road, outside Waterloo station, the route combines from a one-way pair into two-way roads at a dogleg intersection.

Until Stage 2, a local resident of Wyndham said street was quiet outside of the weekday peak hours and "At the weekends, you could have a picnic in the street."

== Origins and early road planning for the corridor (1930s-1970s) ==
=== County of Cumberland planning scheme ===
Prior to plans for the one-way pair, there were plans for a large surface expressway in parallel to the future corridor of the Southern Arterial Route. Plans for a major expressway along this alignment were perhaps first touted from 1938. The County of Cumberland planning scheme, gazetted in 1951, depicted the Southern Expressway as a major expressway running south from Ultimo.

=== Botany Road and Regent Street widening ===
In 1956, a government gazette approved the widening of Botany Road and Regent Street (Main Road No. 170) between Henderson Road and Cleveland Street.

In 1971 the City of Sydney Planning scheme was gazetted, based on the County of Cumberland planning scheme. This added a road reservation for Botany & Regent Street to be widened to 25.6 metres, allowing the road to be widened from a 4 lane to 6 lane road.

=== 'Proposed Truck Route' plan of 1969 ===
The "Proposed Truck Route" plan of 1969, prepared by Cameron and McNamara, was almost identical to later Arterial/Gateway/Distributor/Link announcements. This truck plan included a one-way pair from Ultimo to Bourke Road (Green Square), with a dashed line for a new road directly from Gibbons Street at Lawson Street to near Abercrombie Street.

=== F6 Southern Expressway ===
By 1970, the City of Sydney Planning Scheme map showed an expressway parallel on the west side of the future Southern Arterial Route corridor. A detailed map for Camperdown, Darlington, Forest Lodge, Glebe and Ultimo included a shaded area for the Southern Expressway - requiring the demolition of wide tracts of buildings.

The 1974 Sydney Area Transportation Study recommended retaining the urban expressways.

The February 1976 UTAC report made several recommendations including that "Construction of the first stage of the North Western Expressway be completed as the replacement route for the present Pyrmont Bridge, but further construction west of Darling Harbour be suspended and suitable links to the existing street network be developed" (4d). These links were described in the Glebe Island Arterial (Anzac Bridge) Environmental Impact Statement, which also stated "separate investigation into the possibility of upgrading the southern approaches to the Glebe Island Arterial by making Harris Street and Wattle Street a one way pair over part of their length is presently in hand and does not form part of this E.I.S.".

=== Cancellation of the parallel F6 Southern Expressway corridor ===
By 1974, the City of Sydney described uncertainty over expressway plans were causing "increasing blight" in west Chippendale.

On the 23rd February, 1977 the Wran Government announced it would abandon significant plans for urban expressways in Sydney.

The corridor reservation from the city to Huntley Street, Alexandria was eliminated but the corridor from that point to Tempe was retained.

The DMR investigated a number of alternatives to the Southern Expressway following the Wran government cancellation of urban freeway corridors.

== Early plans for the one-way pair arterial (1970s-1980s) ==
=== 1974 ===
In 1974 the City of Sydney Council recommended a Southern Arterial route as an alternative to the F6 Southern Expressway reservation.. The council action priority was to investigate a 4 lane, grade separated road. It was proposed to utilise the land of the Metropolitan Goods and Main Western railway lines, rather than the current one-way pair model.

This proposal almost exactly matched the recommendation made by the Sydney Area Transportation Study (SATS) study, which was to extend the Western Distributor as a 4-lane freeway through Ultimo to Cleveland Street, with construction from 1981 to 1990. The construction of the Sydney Entertainment Centre later made this route "difficult to achieve".

=== 1980 ===
The 1980 City of Sydney Strategic Plan encouraged comprehensive studies of a Southern Arterial from Day Street to South Sydney.

The 1980 short term road hierarchy recommended swapping the 1979 designation of Harris Street as a minor arterial road and Wattle Street as a Major arterial road, and to upgrade Harris Street as an interim Southern Arterial. The Longer Term Road Hierarchy recommended Development of a Southern Arterial.

The 1980 City of Sydney Strategic Plan described the lack of this road as an obvious omission from state government plans. It stated that the "excess capacity in the ultimate North Western Freeway upper level roadways" could be utilised by the construction of a Southern Arterial. It claimed a grade separated route would be required in the longer term and requested the Department of Main Roads to undertake preliminary planning "as soon as possible."

Corridor options for the route included:

1. using the Darling Harbour Goods Yard railway corridor
2. a one-way pair using Harris and Jones or Wattle Streets
3. an elevated expressway or cut-and-cover tunnel Jones Street, with grade separation at Broadway and Cleveland Street, and a new bridge crossing the railway lines at Redfern
4. further west utilising the Johnston Creek County Road route
5. using some part of the previously designated F6 Southern Freeway corridor

The Traffic Authority of NSW started the Sydney Road Hierarchy Plan (SRHP) in 1980, and was anticipated to be completed in June 1982. The Traffic Authority advised Sydney councils early in 1981 about its intent to undertake the plan. This plan also incorporated a concept of truck routes - the conclusion was that DMR roads should generally be designated as truck routes, and should be progressively upgraded to meet the criteria stated. The project was stated in the Traffic Authority's strategic document (June 1980).

=== 1981 ===
In 1981 there was a perception by residents that traffic is 'getting worse'. South Sydney residents saw themselves as being under siege by traffic, particular from heavy commercial vehicles, with a worsening situation. Traffic flow statistics did not back this up generally. The Citizens' Impact Study on Traffic and Transport established that in South Sydney the majority of people surveyed felt is a major contributing cause of ill-health. "Coughs, headaches, irritability, tension, sore eyes, stress, respiratory problems and sinusitis" were the main health effects reported.

A 1981 traffic study by Pak Poy and Kneebone recommended the function of existing arterial routes (Princes Highway, Botany Road and Mitchell Road/McEvoy Street) be reinforced in preference to the development of new freeway systems. Recommendation 4 was to support the declaration of "truck routes" composed of arterials and sub-arterials with some time-limited exceptions. It was recommended for council to "resist the construction of the Southern Freeway.

As "during the process of collecting information and receiving public submissions, little interest was expressed in the provision of cycling facilities", "consequently no serious consideration was given to the planning of cycle paths in the municipality", or to connect with adjacent land use "which could be expected" to generate cycle trips. The reservations of arterial and sub-arterial roads were to be "fully committed" to vehicular traffic.

A report titled "Traffic and transport in South Sydney" (published by the South Sydney Committee of the Australian Assistance Plan) identified that Botany Road had the highest rate of accidents [sic] of all "Main Roads" in South Sydney, with 377 crashes. Regent Street was the highest rated of "Other Streets" with 99 crashes. "Intersections with more than 18 Accidents" (over an unspecified timeframe) were "Botany Road and McEvoy Street" and "McEvoy and Elizabeth Streets" with equal 41 crashes. (Note: Department of Motor Traffic transport Accident Research Unit)

=== 1983 ===
==== 1983 Plan of Action for South Sydney Improvements ====
In March 1983, the Sydney City Council developed a Plan of Action for Environmental Improvements in the South Sydney area, recommending a one-way pair along Botany road and Wyndham Street terminating at Cleveland Street and O'Riordan Street.

There was a long-standing proposal to improve the capacity of the Botany Road/Regent Street route by widening the road reserve through the City area. This was a long term proposition and would involve "extensive property resumption and road reconstruction". An "alternative low cost scheme" to improve the arterial route was outlined as a one-way pair between St Paul's Place and Green Square, New South Wales.

The area of road carriageway available for "intersection improvements" at St Paul's Place was restricted by the railway overpass. Schemes to straighten the alignment were deemed to be "very expensive", and so the restricted carriageway was considered to "preclude" the development of a cost effective scheme for short term implementation. It was expected the "level of service offered" could be improved by "converting Botany Road/Regent Street and Wyndham Street/Gibbons Street" to a one-way pair between "Lawson Square and Green Square", and implementing closures of roads intersecting with Botany Road as indicated in the South Sydney Traffic Study.

A short length of new roadway was deemed to be required to connect Gibbons Street through to Regent Street at the northern end, and Wyndham Street through to Botany Road at the southern end. The required land for the roadway at the north was owned by the State Rail Authority, which was deemed to be favourable to facilitate acquisition as the scheme would resolve access problems associated with the State Rail Authority proposal to develop the airspace above Redfern railway station, which "would enable that development to proceed".

The "only disbenefit" of the scheme was that "traffic levels on Wyndham Street/Gibbons Street would be increased by approximately 50%", and this traffic would be to the detriment of residents on Wyndham Street and Gibbons Street.

==== 1983 City of Sydney Plan ====
The Sydney City Council's revised strategic plan (City of Sydney Plan) was published on the 6th of December 1983. The Lord Mayor of the City of Sydney called on the Federal Government to fund (through its export roads grant scheme) the construction of a southern arterial road from "Darling Harbour to the industrial areas of South Sydney and Port Botany.

The route was proposed on the grounds of freeing up road capacity, claimed to be needed for development in Haymarket and Darling Harbour. Department of Main Roads developed a concept utilising a 2 lane road (one lane each way) in the cutting for the Darling Harbour Goods Yard railway line, using the railway tunnel under Railway Square, with a focus on serving freight between the now defunct Port Jackson port and Botany Bay Port. It stated there was no logic building a road with more capacity due to capacity constraints of the Western Distributor and Harbour bridge to the north, and Botany Road/Regent Street to the south. It also mentioned "proposals to upgrade the Botany Bay/Regent Street arterial route."

The 1983 plan also sought state government funding for the route, and planned for construction to increase traffic capacity for the Botany Road/Regent Street arterial route and the intersection at St Pauls Place. It proposed investigation into the one-way pair proposal for Botany Road/Regent Street and Wyndham Street/Gibbons Street. It suggested a possible roundabout at St Pauls Place (over the railway tracks), or if that didn't enable enough traffic, an unconventional intersection design including a 10-lane wide intersection with 2 hook turn lanes in each west-west direction and 6 centre through lanes.

It rationalised a one-way pair conversion of Botany Road, Regent Street and Wyndham Street/Gibbons Street from Lawson Square to Green Square as a cheaper alternative to acquiring and demolishing many Redfern buildings to widen Botany Road/Regent Street. The widening was estimated to cost around $12 million, with the estimated cost of the one-way scheme to be $1.2 million. It did not discuss any social or environmental cost of widening the road, only the financial cost of property acquisition. It stated this one-way scheme would increase traffic levels on Wyndham Street/Gibbons Street by approximately 50%.

==== Australian Roads Federation Proposal (1983) ====
In 1983 after two years of preparation the "influential" roads construction lobby group Australian Roads Federation proposed a $1.5 billion plan for Sydney's roads, including 155 kilometres of urban freeways and 245 kilometres of improve arterial roads. The proposals were prepared by Sinclair Knight & Partners. The "Development of Harris Street - Botany Road and Wattle Street - Wyndham Street as a surface high capacity one-way pair from Blackwattle Bay to Botany" was one of 6 main features of the proposal. This may be the study referenced in a 1987 newspaper article calling for a southern arterial road.

=== 1984 ===
In May 1984, the City of Sydney Council put out a notice of a public meeting to "discuss the proposal to convert Botany Road/Wyndham Street Redfern into a one-way pair" at 7:30pm on May 23, 1984 at the Redfern Town Hall two days beforehand and on the day.

The November 1984 Sydney Road Hierarchy Plan (SRHP) Summary Report included a note that "Wilson St/Abercrombie St route south of Cleveland St is not favoured by Council as a sub-arterial but has been agreed to in the short term pending improvements to St Pauls Square and Botany Road."

=== 1985 ===
In 1985, there was provision for a future corridor for a southern arterial road, but no allocation of funds.

== Pyrmont-Alexandria traffic management proposal (1986-1990s) ==
=== Southern Arterial Route announcement ===
The proposal by the DMR of a one-way pair system of Wattle/Abercrombie Streets northbound and Harris/Regent Streets southbound was announced in April 1986. In April it was believed the road would require the resumption of 7 properties with 5 further properties further affected. It was forecast to cost $12 million. Work was expected to begin early in the financial year from mid-1986, wholly funded by the state government. The plan included new roundabouts at present day Euston Road and Sydney Park Road, and at Bridge Road and Wattle Street. It was considered as a bypass of the existing two-lane Princes Highway through Newtown.

A January 1987 article suggests that "in the face of such obtuseness" regarding increased traffic due to the Darling Harbour Project, "it was understandable that local residents commissioned their own "community impact statement" of traffic management by the Department of Main Roads" in Ultimo, Pyrmont and Chippendale from an independent consultant, Mr Jonathan Falk, last year". It also suggested converting the "existing railway lines under Pier Street and Broadway", also known as The Goods Line into a road.

Amid concern in 1987 about traffic congestion caused by cars on George Street, Sydney delaying buses (before a bus lane was installed in July 1997), Opposition spokesperson on transport at the time Bruce Baird claimed "Every major traffic study on the area agreed on the solution to the problem" - "A southern arterial road should be built to provide an access road from the western distributor to the southern suburbs, greatly reducing traffic congestion in the area".

An undated technical report on acoustic impacts of the route exists.

=== City of Sydney Council reaction to the southern road route ===
On 26 May 1986, the City of Sydney Council discussed the Glebe Island Arterial (Anzac Bridge) and a southern road route. The minutes suggest the council was surprised by the plans and only learned about them via a "recent press release by the Minister for Roads on the proposed southern road route from Pyrmont to the Princes Highway, St. Peters." The council carried a motion including the "Department of Main Roads be requested to brief appropriate Aldermen on the proposed one-way pairing of Botany Road and Wyndham Street" and the "State Government's proposal to construct a southern road route from Ultimo to Green Square, Alexandria". There was also concern an EIS was not being prepared - the council requested "written representations to the Minister for Roads and Minister for Planning and Environment seeking an urgent assurance that an Environmental Impact Statement will be prepared and exhibited in accordance with Part V of the Environmental Planning and Assessment Act".

On 8 December 1986, "Mr. Peter Thornton, MacDonald Wagner Pty. Ltd., together with Mr. Peter Melser of M.S.J. Keys Young, Mr. Chris Hallam, Traffic Planner, and Mr. Ross Nettle of the Department of Main Roads, presented a briefing on the proposal by the Department of Main Roads to develop an arterial route between Pyrmont and St. Peters."

=== Environmental Impact Statement ===
As early as 6 August 1986, Laurie Brereton advised the community that an Environmental Impact Statement (EIS) was not warranted. According to the SOS, lobbying by the SOS Committee and others secured an EIS.

In February 1987, the Department of Main Roads (New South Wales) released the EIS for the Pyrmont-Alexandria traffic management proposal. Originally, the minister referred to the proposal as the "Paired Roads System", then the "Southern Road System" and finally the "Southern Arterial Link". The SOS group criticised the final name of the EIS as "soft", and claimed "it is a freeway system".

The EIS claimed in section 3.8.2 that the streetscape of Redfern is "derelect" and "dilapidated". It claimed in section 4.1.4 that it was "unlikely that the number of pedestrian accidents would significantly increase". Section 4.5 of the EIS claimed that air quality would be improved and noise would be reduced. The EIS claimed it would benefit residents of Abercrombie Street.

The proposal included Princes Highway widening (at current Sydney Park Road), "Mitchell Road Extension" (now known as Sydney Park Road) and a roundabout at Euston Road and Mitchell Road (now known as Sydney Park Road). (Note: Leaflet titled "The Southern Arterial Proposal" stating "Make your objection to the proposal by Friday, April 3")

The road's "controversial environmental impact statement was approved by the State Government in mid-1987".

==== Alternatives to the proposal ====
The EIS discussed a number of alternatives to the proposed Southern Arterial Route, including:

- 'do nothing'
- the "Botany Road Widening Scheme Option"
- the "Broadway Rail Tunnel Option"
- the "High Standard Limited Access Route" option
- the "Public Transport Option"
- (alternatives to an open cut at Fig Street)
- The "Wyndham Street Residents' Alternative"

===== The High Standard Limited Access Route =====
This alternative was for a limited access route - but specifically not the Southern Expressway proposal as the land for this corridor was sold after the 1976 government decision. This alternative was studied by Project Planning Associates Pty. Ltd. (1986) on behalf of the Department of Main Roads. It was to involve a "grade separated route along Fig, Wattle, Abercrombie, Holden, Regent, Gibbons, and Wyndham Streets" at an estimated cost of $65.8 million. It was found to "affect" 164 properties and 4 parks. The EIS understands in 1987 that a "high capacity limited access route would cause severe severance effects in the community and in particular would affect the aboriginal housing area in Chippendale as a result of the need to cross the railway on a new alignment".

This alternative was dismissed due to less favourable "community impact, cost and time for construction", as well as "significant disruption to traffic, particularly on major cross streets such as Broadway and Cleveland Street" during construction.

===== The Public Transport Option =====
The Public Transport Option was dismissed as "Diversion of car drivers and passengers to the existing rail network is not considered likely" because "it would require a significant shift in attitude to transport by current and future corridor users" among other stated reasons. The EIS also stated that "neither rail or bus public transport satisfies the objectives of the Proposal as set out in Section 2.1".

===== The Wyndham Street Residents' Alternative =====
The EIS discussed an alternative presented by the residents of Wyndham Street. It states that in terms of projected benefits, the half of the proposal north of St Paul's Place has a higher priority than the southern half.

This alternative prescribes the "one-way pair to extend to the south only to Henderson Road/Raglan Street, with both Wyndham Street and Botany Road staying two-way roads south of this point".

Traffic modelling is presented for this alternative, summarised by "These results are significantly worse than the 'no Proposal' results and very significantly worse than those for the Proposal. It is apparent that the Wyndham Street residents' alternative is not a feasible alternative to the Proposal". The one-way pair currently ends at Henderson Road / Raglan Street, becoming two-way roads south of this point, the same as this proposal.

=== Reaction to the Environmental Impact Statement ===
South Sydney residents, angered by the proposed Southern Arterial Route, decided to submit their concerns to the Department of Main Roads on the night of the 5th of March 1987. The residents claimed the proposed route would cause major access issues to schools, community facilities and shopping arcades for people living on either side of the road system.

=== EIS approval and implementation ===
On 23 March 1987, the City of Sydney Council sought an urgent briefing on the "proposed Southern Road System", and an extension of time after 3 April 1987 for the Council's EIS submission. The Save Our Suburbs and UPROAR groups were also invited to address the Council before the briefing.

On 26 May 1987, the City of Sydney Council reiterated a request for "an Inquiry into the Southern Road System under the Environmental Planning and Assessment Act", and request that if the proposal proceeds "serious consideration be given to the alternative Scheme for the Redfern/Waterloo Section of the proposal, prepared by Council Officers."

The City of Sydney Council received correspondence from:

- "Laurie Brereton, Minister for Public Works, Ports and Roads, dated 2nd October, 1987" that he "concurs with the decision of the Minister for Planning and Environment not to hold an Inquiry under Section 119 of the Environmental Planning and Assessment Act into the proposed Southern Arterial Route"
- "A letter from UPROAR dated 6 October 1987" that refers to the "decision of the Minister for Planning and Environment not to hold an Inquiry on the Southern Arterial Route" and requests the council write to the Premier to seek "assistance for the setting up of the task force to satisfy Council's decision of 9th March, 1987"
- "A letter from SOS (Save Our Suburbs) dated 12th October, 1987", which includes a "copy of the opinion of the Department of Housing officers on the Southern Arterial Road Proposal" and "urging Council not to adopt the recommendation of the Works Committee at Council on 13th October, 1987, relating to the Southern Arterial Road"

In October 1987 the City of Sydney council resolved that "no objection be raised to the road works and traffic management works required for the completion of Stage 1 of the Southern Arterial Route between Pyrmont and Alexandria" was carried. Commissioner Oakes asked the City Engineer to advise council of the consequences if the council did object to the proposal; they "informed the Council that the proposed works were to coincide with the opening of the Glebe Island Arterial Road towards the end of this year and it was considered that the works would improve the movement of traffic by conversion to one-way traffic of streets such as Wattle Street, Harris Street, Regent Street and Abercrombie Street and that the alternative of leaving the streets as two-way traffic movement would lead to further congestion and chaos".

== Construction of stages 1 and 2 ==
=== Stage 1 ===
Stage 1 of the Southern Arterial Route was the section north of Cleveland Street.

Stage 1 of the Southern Arterial opened on 13 December 1987. A newspaper on 12 and 14 December by the Department of Main Roads described the new traffic arrangements. A map was displayed below the notice text.

At noon on July 27, 1988, a ramp from Harris St to the Darling Harbour Viaducts opened. A DMR press release stated that "There will be a lighted pedestrian subway under the new connecting ramp." and "Pedestrians in the Ultimo area are now well served by grade separated road crossings and regulated crossings at traffic signals."

=== Stage 2 ===
On 16 March 1987, the NSW State Government announced Sydney is to have a 93-kilometre orbital route linking all major incoming highways, a second Spit Bridge to improve traffic flow, and another harbour crossing by the end of the century. "upgrading of the Southern arterial link" was also included. This plan didn't represent increased road spending, but assumed the current spending of $1 billion a year would continue. Traffic consultants and engineers met on the morning of the 17th of March 1987 at Sydney Town Hall on what the Government should have included in Roads 2000. The Roads 2000 plan included a proposal for an orbital route around Sydney, and "the Southern Arterial route from Sydney City to Alexandria" made up part of this route. A the time of the announcement of Roads 2000 the only completed sections of the orbital were "short sections" of the Southern Arterial and Prospect Arterial.

On 2 September 1988, the Department of Main Roads gave notice of a proposal to "fix and/or refix the levels of Main Road No. 170 - Regent Street between Redfern Street, Redfern and Meagher Street, Chippendale.

On 17 October 1988, the City of Sydney Council resolved that no objection be raised to the works required for Stage 2 of the Southern Arterial Route (from Cleveland Street, Redfern, to Bourke Road, Alexandria), based on a 17th October 1988 report by the City Engineer.

Estimates in 1988/1989 for the cost of the Southern Arterial Route between Harris Street, Pyrmont and Botany Road, Waterloo was estimated to total $23,470,000 having started in 1986, expected expenditure in 1988/89 was $5,465,000, expenditure to 30/06/88 to be $2,843,000, with completion estimated in 1992.

The Roads & Traffic Authority notice for the South Western (F5) Freeway EIS public exhibition stated "The Proposal would form an integral link between the Pyrmont-Alexandria (Southern Arterial) Traffic Management Scheme" and the South Western Freeway.

The Southern Arterial Route was mentioned in the City West Regional Environmental Study as a required improvement of the road network improvement in the short to medium term. While stating that "The major arterial road improvement in the area is the Southern Arterial...", the 1990 City West Urban Strategy report stated that "With the high public transport mode split, the arterial road system has capacity to accommodate the level of development proposed."

In a three-page 'informative feature' spread in The Eastern Herald (The Sydney Morning Herald) in May 1991, the Roads & Traffic Authority announced a $1 billion program of works for the next five years.

It included that the RTA had undertaken a $39 million scheme for roadworks along the streets of the southern arterial route. It stated that completed works included:

- the Fig Street ramp
- widening of Cleveland Street to six lanes between St Paul's Place and Abercrombie Street

It stated that works yet to be completed included:

- Gibbons Street had not yet been extended north from Lawson Square
- McEvoy Street had not yet been widened
- Wyndham Street and Gibbons Street will become one-way northbound from Green Square to Lawson Square and beyond
- Regent Street and Botany Road will become one-way southbound from north of Lawson Square to Green Square
- a one-way northbound connection was to be implemented from Botany Road to Wyndham Street.

It also stated that 13 properties would be wholly or partially required for the work. It claimed "eleven of these properties were in the Cleveland Street / Regent Street section and are generally old commercial buildings in poor repair", that "Four of these buildings are State Rail Authority-owned" and that "None is considered to be of special historical or architectural value".

It was stated on the same page that the "Major road program for Sydney Central-South" included the Southern Arterial as one of 22 capital works projects part of a $1 billion road program over the next 5 years.

A 1992 photo depicts the construction of the Gibbons Street segment from Lawson Street to Cleveland Street.

A March 1992 Draft Plan for a nearby park anticipated that the Southern Arterial Route, due to be completed in 1996, would "alleviate some traffic management problems existing along King Street, Newtown and perhaps reduce some of the pedestrian access problems along City Road".

A March 1992 newspaper article stated that parts of the Southern Arterial through Redfern were part of $1.5 billion of road projects announced by Minister for Public Works and Roads Mr Murray to be completed in 1992. The Prime Minister at the time Paul Keating announced had announced in a recent economic statement introduction of tax-free bonds aimed at encouraging private industry to invest in public road building. The stage of the Southern Arterial through Redfern (the "widening of Cleveland Street and the widening of the bridge over the railway line at St Paul's Place") was anticipated to be opened by the end of March 1992. The next stage - "a new connection between Regent Street and Lawsons Square" - was anticipated to be opened by the end of August 1992.

Over the six week period leading up to the opening, residents and workers endeavoured to stop the introduction of stage two through lobbying, a media campaign and a blockade of Regent Sheet.

== The impact of the opening of Stage 2 ==
Stage 2 of the Southern Arterial Route was opened on June 21, 1992. A newspaper notice by the Roads & Traffic Authority on 19 and 20 June stated "the reorganisation will reduce congestion, offer smoother journeys to and from the Central Business District and provide improved conditions for pedestrians, locally." The included map reflects the current state of the road network.

Heavy vehicle traffic on Wyndham Street increased after the opening. There was a "dramatic increase in traffic", causing residents to suffer sleep disturbances at night and interfering with conversations inside residents homes. Crossing the street became difficult "particular for children, the aged, disabled and mentally ill". An interviewed resident stated that the neighbours sold and moved out due to high lead levels in their daughter's blood.

Residents living in the high rise on the corner of Pitt Street and Raglan Streets experienced windows shaking when trucks pass, and vibration caused structural damage to "several homes in Philip St recently". The intersection of Raglan Street and Henderson road (with the dog leg turn into Gibbons Street) was considered to be "a nightmare intersection both for pedestrians crossing, and traffic conflicting".

Pedestrian access across Regent Street became more difficult, particularly for elderly people, who both have to wait a long time for the traffic signals to change and have insufficient time to make the crossing. Pedestrian crossings on both Raglan Street and Cope Street, and across Elizabeth Street near Phillip Street were requested by residents. Residents called for "pedestrian underpasses or overpasses at Redfern St and Raglan St to ameliorate the impact of the paired roads on pedestrian traffic", and to facilitate public transport access.

Residents noted the decline in the shopping centre over twelve months and have "serious concerns" increased difficulty in getting to the shops will lead to closure of businesses required by the community. The Food for Less supermarket suffered a 30% decline. There was concern local shoppers without cars would have no access to a supermarket at all.

A real estate agent informed a local resident that the Southern Arterial wiped $50,000 off the value of his house (in 1993).

While the RTA's traffic consultant concluded Wyndham Street "does not experience a high level of truck activity", residents described trucks disturbing the relative quietness of the night "like explosions".

"Mike", who lived on a busy corner of Wyndham ran (as of 1993) "a kind of unofficial St John's Ambulance station from his house", coming out to look after the victims lying on the road. He told the Citizen's Advocate (for stage 3) "Since I've lived here I've lost 5 blankets.. and saved two lives.". In December 1992 a car crashed into his house. Mike stated "They are crucifying the people who live here".

A local resident interviewed (Note: Joyce, an 11 year resident of Buckland Street (as of 1993)) stated there was a big turnover of residents in Wyndham Street in the 6 years from 1987 to 1993.

The RTA "promised to continue to monitor the noise" from the introduction of the Southern Arterial Route, however the Citizen's advocate did not believe this was done.

The Education Department sent out engineers to investigate air conditioning troubles at Alexandria Public School in Mitchell Road (now Alexandria Park Community School). They concluded the windows should stay sealed because the noise from the traffic if opened would be "unbearable" (their word) for teachers and kids.

The principal of the Alexandria Public School in Mitchell Road (now Alexandria Park Community School) stated in 1993 he was "not game" to have his pupils tested for lead levels in their blood. They stated "if they're high over in Balmain, there's no way they aren't going to be as high here".

The "Waterloo shopping centre" (described as the intersection Regent/Botany/Raglan/Henderson) was impacted by the opening of stage 2. The manager of Fleming's FOOD FOR LESS described a 10% drop of business due to stage 2.

== Stage 3 ==
Stage 3 of the Southern Arterial Route never proceeded.

The Roads and Traffic Authority carried out a fresh EIS (rather than rely on the 1987 EIS, six-years-old at the time) due to protests by local citizens and due to the number of traffic developments that had occurred. These residents also insisted on a "citizens' advocate". The RTA decided to undertake a number of studies to contribute to the EIS. The Traffic Study (Note: the draft "Social Impact Analysis" described this study as "this", the same study.) was contracted to Project Planning Associates in April 1993. Studies were commissioned on heritage, vibration, noise, air pollution, and landscaping.

A draft Traffic Study was produced in mid June 1993.

As part of the Social Impact Study of the proposed Stage 3, 3 public meetings were called (attended "some 95 people"), 8200 leaflets were distributed with reply paid cards.

The implementation of Stage 2 created such congestion that it drove people to support Stage 3 on the grounds that it would abolish the bottleneck at Henderson Road/Raglan Street/Wyndham Street.

Traffic on Mitchell/Henderson was predicted by consultants to return to current (1993) levels in a dozen years in the best case scenario, with the night traffic being 30% higher than even Wyndham. (Note: Table 8.2 and Figure 17 - source unstated, likely the Stage 3 EIS)

Stage 3 of the Southern Arterial was predicted to cut average delays by 12 seconds, from 24 to 12 seconds (and rising from 12 to 25 seconds by 2005). Average delays (for cars) on Wyndham street was modelled to drop from 34 seconds to 6 seconds before going back up to 32 seconds by 2005. Average delays (for cars) was predicted to drop from 42 seconds to 36 seconds on Botany Road before rising to 51 seconds by 2005.

Hall Greenland stated the computer model used by the consultant to evaluate stage 3 was apparently the RTA's official model, SCATES, which to their knowledge had never undergone any independent assessment. The 1987 EIS on all stages of the Southern Arterial referenced an earlier RTA (then DMR) computer model, TRANPLAN.

The 1987 TRANPLAN model predicted that traffic on the main arterial routes in the area would rise by 14% in the thirty years 1981 to 2011, but in reality there has been a 27% increase in traffic on South Dowling, Princess Highway and Regent Street over the four year period 1987 to 1991 (according to the RTA).

The EIS traffic consultant for the Stage 3 was stated on a leaflet by The Public Practice to be Ross Nettle.

=== Cancellation of Stage 3 ===
In Winter 1993, Marg Barry wrote an article in the Inner Voice publication titled "Southern Arterial Grinds to a Halt". This article describes the "massive" 46.5% drop in funds for transport and communications and the resultant meeting at the RTA. It states within days of budget day "members of the Southern Arterial Stage 3 Environmental Impact Study (EIS) Working Party had letters from the RTA putting the EIS into slow gear on the grounds that: "Until some decisions are taken about the termination point for the M5 East Motorway, we will not be able to assess the possible traffic impacts on the Traffic Study for the Southern Arterial Stage 3 EIS. As a result (it) will take longer than we anticipated, and we will have to delay considering most issues until some time next year."

As there were three possible termination points for the M5 under consideration, the RTA decided that these variations restricted the accuracy of forecasts and conclusions in the Traffic Study. The RTA deemed the EIS process for Stage 3 should be delayed until greater clarification was available.

The Inner Voice article outlines the state of the EIS documents at the time - at that point the EIS Working Party had received Traffic, Air Quality and Heritage Reports, a Noise Quality Study had been completed, the Social Impact Study was to be concluded and the Landscaping Study was put on hold. (Note: The City of Sydney hold planning documents for Stage 3, including the plan, EIS, heritage study, air quality assessment.) The "chief conclusion" of the Citizens' Advocate, Hall Greenland, was "If people count, Stage 3 of the Southern Arterial will not be built (and) Stage 2 will be undone or significantly modified".

In Spring 1993, the same publication published an article titled "A Solution in Search of a Problem?". It states the conclusion of the draft Social Impact Assessment of the Southern Arterial Stage 3 route was that "Stage 3 seems to be a solution in search of a problem". The article states the report found the costs outweighed the benefits and discerned a fundamental disagreement between residents and traffic planners when it came to impact evaluation, and the consultants were asked to draw the Social Impact Study to a close when the future of Stage 3 became uncertain.

The summary of the report "discusses the need for action if Stage Three does not eventuate due to: a serious traffic problem from congestion at Henderson Road where the one-way pair from Stage 2 switches back to two 2-way roads; a continuing traffic problem for Wyndham Street residents (due mainly to trucks and congestion), or; a continuing traffic problem for the shopping centre (due to speed down the one-way stretch)". One of the three recommendations of the residents workshop which concluded the study was that Botany Road should be reverted to being two-way through the shopping centre.

A heritage study and an air quality assessment and draft noise assessment were completed in August 1993. An RTA letter on August 20 1993 outlined the "overall Noise Assessment Study awaits better traffic forecasts".

At a meeting held on October 11 1993, the "RTA's response to the Social Impact Analysis Report Chapter 6.2 "Proposed alleviating measures" was given", and the South Sydney City Council's comments on the Heritage Study were given.

A 30 November 1993 letter to members of the working group stated "You will be contacted in 1994, when the M5 Motorway situation becomes clearer, regarding the future timetable for this Working Party".

== Later Proposals and Studies (1990s-2020s) ==
=== Proposals to extend the Arterial in the 1990s ===
==== Funding in the 1997-1998 NSW budget ====
Partial funding was allocated in the 1997-98 budget to complete the route, named the "BOTANY TO CITY VIA SOUTHERN ARTERIAL - SOUTHERN ARTERIAL ROUTE STAGE 3: ROBEY ST, MASCOT TO HENDERSON RD, WATERLOO". Completion was expected in 1999. It states expenditure to the 30th of June 1997 was $150,000, and budget allocation for 1997/98 was $4,000,000. It states the estimated total cost was $15,000,000.

The Southern Arterial does not appear in the 1998/1999, 1999/2000 or 2000/2001 budget papers, or the RTA Annual Report 2000.

The 1997 Draft Environmental Impact Statement for the Second Sydney Airport assumed the "Southern Arterial to Green Square (Wyndham St/Botany Street as one way pair) including extension of Wyndham Street to O'Riordon Street (2 lanes each way)" would be completed by 2001, and that a "one-way pair between Green Square and Robey Street" along O'Riordan Street and Bourke Road was "under consideration" by the Roads and Traffic Authority. This report assumes "One way pair O'Riordan St southbound, Bourke Rd northbound, between Green Square and Robey St (6 lanes from 4 lanes)" would be completed by 2006.

=== Proposals to extend the Arterial in the 2000s ===
A November 2002 report on the Port Botany expansion stated that the proposed arterial was considered "a long-term proposition". A traffic assessment in May 2008 "envisaged" that the paired one-way route "will be extended at some future time along Botany Road and Wyndham Street to at least Green Square and possible further south."

The 2001 Green Square proposal included that the Roads and Traffic Authority planned to extend the Southern to the Green Square intersections.

==== Roads Boost for South Sydney program (announced 2003) ====
On 24 January 2003, the Minister for Transport and Minister for Roads Carl Scully announced a 10 (or 8) year road works program. A press release states that in excess of $80 million had been allocated. The first priority was the southern arterial route extension and an upgrade of an intersection at Green Square. It states "The southern arterial proposal will help solve this problem by extending the one way pair arrangement of Botany Road being one way southbound and Wyndham Street being one way northbound between Green Square and Henderson Road".

==== Funding in the 2003 RTA Annual Report ====
In the Major works appendix of the 2003 RTA Annual Report, funding for the Southern Arterial Route is documented. It is listed as "Botany to City Via Southern Arterial Southern Arterial at Green Square". "Announced completion" is listed as 2005, estimated total cost is $10,000,000, 2002-2003 expenditure is listed as $155,000 and expenditure to the 30th of June 2003 is listed as $450,000.

==== 2003 Study (Botany Road and Wyndham Street Southern Arterial Route Corridor Improvement Study) ====
The Green Square Road Hierarchy and Traffic Study recommend the extension of the Southern Arterial south along Botany Road and Wyndham Street to Green Square, New South Wales by 2006.

On 11 April 2005, the City of Sydney Council discussed the Zetland Area Traffic study. Report papers for this meeting make reference to an earlier study of this corridor. The Botany Road and Wyndham Street Southern Arterial Route Corridor Improvement study examined the option of creating a 'one-way pair' route between Botany Road and Wyndham Street by extending the existing one-way system south of Henderson Road to the Green Square intersection. The study found the corridor would have more capacity as a one-way system than a two-way system and would increase the capacity of the corridor, but the effects would be relatively localised. It was stated other network road works "would remain unchanged" irrespective of whether a one or two way system was adopted.

The preferred option of the traffic management plan retained two-way operation along both Botany Road and Wyndham Street.

A unanimously carried resolution a City of Sydney acknowledgement that mode shift to public transport would be required to accommodate peak trip volumes and that "...parts of the road network will have less traffic carrying capacity than required to accommodate expected peak period traffic volumes according to the analysis undertaken in the study...", however that "further improvements in modal split away from private vehicles and towards public transport will be required to accommodate the demand for trips if the exemptions above are supported".

Further context of the City of Sydney position on the one-way pair was detailed in the 11th of November 2004 council item regarding the Green Square Town Centre Draft Masterplan and Local Environmental Plan and Related Matters. Under "External State Arterial Road (RTA) upgrade requirements", a 'Medium Term' Recommendation included "Capacity improvements (including a recommended option for one-way pair) along the Botany Road and Wyndham Street corridor to the Green Square Intersection".

Paragraph 136 states "Council may not necessarily support some of the state road works that these studies have recommended in order to accommodate increased vehicular trips. The ‘oneway pair’ option for Botany and Wyndham Roads is one such example. Whilst the traffic modelling indicates that one-way pairing will ultimately be required, the urban design and amenity impacts of such an option conflict with Council's objectives for the area.".

==== Redfern tunnel proposals (2004) ====
In cabinet papers, dated October 2004 and seen by the Sydney Morning Herald on 29 November 2004, six tunnel options were presented as part of plans for redevelopment of Redfern:

This corridor, while underground rather than an elevated expressway, would have been similar to the "High Standard Limited Access Route" alignment presented in the 1987 EIS.

An alternative pedestrian overpass was considered at a lower cost than road tunnels.

==== Funding in 2004-2006 RTA Annual Reports and State Budgets ====
The RTA announced funding of $10 million for implementation beginning from the 2003-2004 financial year.

The arterial appears in the 2004 RTA Annual Report under "APPENDIX 01 // MAJOR WORKS (AS PER 2003 BUDGET PAPER No.4)". Listed as "Botany to City via Southern Arterial, Southern Arterial and Green Square", announced completion is listed as NA, estimated total cost is listed as NA, 2003-2004 expenditure is listed as $237,000 and expenditure to June 2004 is listed as $687,000.

In the 2005 RTA Annual Report, the "Southern Arterial and Green Square (planning)" project appears. Annual completion date is listed as NA, estimated total cost is listed as NA, 2004-2005 expenditure is listed as $14,000 and Previous Year's expenditure is listed as $687,000.

The "Integrated transport network" section of the "Infrastructure Statement 2005-06" includes (under chapter 2 Policies, 2.1 Planning, METROPOLITAN STRATEGY) the following discussion of the Arterial: "Improving existing transport networks through initiatives such as the planning for the Southern Arterial and Green Square road networks and the Westlink M7 and Cross City Tunnel, both of which are nearing completion,...". It states these improvements are included as "Significant infrastructure related initiatives influenced by the Metropolitan Strategy".

The project doesn't appear in the 2006 RTA Annual Report.

==== Green Square Road Hierarchy and Traffic Study (RTA, unknown date) ====
The April 2010 "Planning Proposal: transport Report for Proposed Town Core Sites within the Green Square Town Centre" by Colston Budd Hunt & Kafes Pty Ltd, on behalf of "Green Square consortium and Landcom" references a one-way pair study. This report states (2.19) that "The RTA has investigated a plan to convert Botany Road and Wyndham Street north of Green Square into a one-way pair in order to extend the Southern Arterial route from Raglan Street/Henderson Street in Redfern southwards to Green Square. O’Riordan Street would then form the continuation of this route southwards to the airport. This proposal was investigated in the “Green Square Road Hierarchy and Traffic Study”. The RTA has decided not to proceed with the plan and has prepared an alternative detailed scheme to upgrade the intersections of Bourke Street with Botany Road, O’Riordan Street and Wyndham Street, in order to provide additional capacity and a configuration that would be compatible with the proposed development of the town centre.

The City of Sydney Planning Policy Sub-Committee stated in 2007 that "The arterial network is under the care and control of the RTA which has future plans to complete the Southern Arterial route".

=== Proposals to remove the Arterial in the 2000s ===
==== Redfern Waterloo Authority Request (2006) ====
As of February 2006 the Redfern-Waterloo Authority's vision was to reinstate two way traffic operations on Regent and Gibbons Streets. They believed it would create a safer main street and pedestrian environment. The RWA believed the restoration of Regent Street to two way traffic is feasible.

In April 2006 Clover Moore's submission to the submission to the Redfern Waterloo Authority's draft Built Environment Plan as the Member for Bligh stated that "The Roads and Traffic Authority has not agreed to any action on area road traffic and has been long committed to the Regent and Gibbons Streets two-way pair."

In December 2006 the South Sydney Herald published that the Redfern-Waterloo Authority had been trying to convince the Roads & Traffic Authority (RTA) of the merits of reverting Regent Street to two-way traffic. The Redfern-Waterloo Authority and the RTA met to discuss the issue, however the RTA reportedly confirmed its position to retain one-way operation.

==== Redfern Pedestrian Cycling and Traffic Calming Resolution (2007) ====
The City of Sydney Council resolved on 7 May 2007 as part of the Redfern Redfern Pedestrian Cycling and Traffic Calming (PCTC) Plan (formerly Local Area Traffic Management Plan) to support to returning the Regent/Gibbons/Wyndham/Botany and Elizabeth/Chalmers one-way streets to two-way traffic flow. The council also gave support to develop a strategy to implement these changes in consultation with the Redfern-Waterloo Authority, the Roads & Traffic Authority and the community.

Botany Road, Gibbons, Regent and Wyndham Streets north of Henderson Road are classified as State Roads and are the responsibility of the NSW Government, administered by Transport for NSW.

The City of Sydney Council stated they would write to the new Minister for Roads seeking action on converting the Regent Street/Botany Road and Wyndham Street / Gibbons Street one-way pair to two-way operations.

==== Corridor Action Plan for Botany Road between the CBD and the Green Square Urban Renewal Area (2009) ====
A stakeholder meeting between the City of Sydney, Transport for NSW (then NSW Transport and Infrastructure), the Roads & Traffic Authority, Landcom, the Redfern-Waterloo Authority, the Department of Planning and RailCorp was held in August 2009. The aim of the meeting was to progress a detailed Corridor Action Plan for Botany Road between the CBD and the Green Square Urban Renewal Area. The City of Sydney raised the two-way proposal as an issue to be addressed in this action plan. A consultant was engaged for this study to consider the Regent Street/Botany Road and Wyndham Street/Gibbons Street one-way pair.

=== Proposals to extend the Arterial in the 2010s ===
==== State Infrastructure Strategy (Infrastructure NSW, 2012) ====
The 2012 State Infrastructure Strategy recommended converting Bourke Rd and O’Riordan St (as north as Green Square) into three-lane one way routes.

==== NSW Long Term Transport Master Plan (2012) ====
In December 2012 the NSW Long Term Transport Master Plan included "Sydney Airport to the CBD" as one of Sydney's 6 most constrained road corridors. Transport for NSW was identifying upgrades to Botany Road to improve the flow of traffic (including bus traffic).

Actions included (under a pinch points improvement program) implementing one-way pair operation on Bourke Street, Bourke Road and O'Riordan Street, priority measures, examination of an alternative cycleway route, and dedicated bus-lane on each road.

==== Mascot to Eveleigh Road Network Plan (RMS, June 2018) ====
The "Mascot to Eveleigh Road Network Plan" (RNP) is discussed in the April 2021 "Botany Road Corridor - Transport and Traffic" report. This report states the RNP "connects the strategic aspirations of Future Transport 2056 with the practical requirements of road network users". It states one "opportunity" discussed in the RNP is "Consider the opportunity for an extension of the one-way pair".

==== Traffic and Transport Context Report (Jacobs, June 2018) ====
This report is summarised and discussed in the 2021 Botany Road Corridor Urban Design Study. This 2021 study states the 2018 report discusses either extending or removing the one-way pair. The advantage identified for extending the one-way pair is "Possible opportunities for additional mid-block crossing opportunities", however several disadvantages are identified. There are no disadvantages identified in the June 2018 report to removing the one-way pair.

=== Proposals to extend the Arterial in the 2020s ===
==== Simulation of extending one-way pair (VLC, May 2024) ====
A May 2024 article by VLC discusses a simulation of extending the one-way pair. It states "The aim of this test is to see if these changes could enable an overhaul of signal timings and intersection configuration to significantly improve walkability and add public green space without undue loss of function for car and commercial vehicle drivers". It include a possible further investigation could include "O’Riordan St tunnel to remove even more surface traffic to improve pedestrian accessibility".

==== Future Transport 2056: South East Sydney Transport Strategy (Economic scenario) (TfNSW, 2020) ====
The "Economic scenario" of the Future Transport 2056: South East Sydney Transport Strategy included "Extension of the Botany Road / Wyndham Street one-way pair to Mascot (via O’Riordan Street / Botany Road)" as part of the "Transport Network Assumptions".

=== Proposals to remove the Arterial in the 2020s ===
==== Botany Road Corridor - Transport and Traffic (Cattell Cooper, April 2021) ====
The April 2021 Cattell Cooper report "Botany Road Corridor – Transport and Traffic" states "The removal of the one-way pair offers opportunities for Regent Street that have the potential to increase its place function, moving it from a vibrant street to a ‘place for people’ and reducing the need for future compromise."

==== Botany Road Corridor Urban Design Study (TZG for City of Sydney, March 2021) ====
The Botany Road Corridor Urban Design Study study recommends that the one-way pair is removed to improve amenity and safety for pedestrians, cyclists, residents and bus users, and converted to two-way traffic.

This study references the previous two reports: "High level options to remove the one way pairs and reconfigure two-way pairs have been previously developed by Jacobs in their 2018 Report. Cattell Cooper with the City of Sydney have developed these options in more detail, to inform the Urban Design study."

==== Future Transport 2056: Tech Central Camperdown-Ultimo Place-based Transport Strategy (Transport for NSW, November 2021) ====
Strategic direction 1 of this strategy is "Creating walkable streets and places". Under "Priorities for investigation" 1.6 ("Better connections from Haymarket to Eveleigh, Redfern and Waterloo"), an investigation priority is "c) Reconfiguration of the one-way pairs through Redfern to create a people friendly public transport spine along Regent Street and a traffic bypass on Wyndham Street". Under "Strategic Direction 2: Enhancing access by cycling and public transport within and beyond Tech Central's boundaries", priority "2.8 - An efficient and equitable allocation of road space and capacity" includes "...to review current road space allocation, road network priority and road network operations throughout Tech Central, including:...h) The conversion of one-way pairs to two-way operations on roads that support rapid bus lines and to support lower traffic speeds and volumes in locations with high place function such as Regent Street/Botany Road in Redfern and Harris Street in Ultimo." Regent Street, Botany Road and Harris Street all make up the Southern Arterial Route one-way pair. This strategy was released in November 2021.

== Criticism and Community Response ==
Across multiple stages of the scheme there was strong opposition to implementation of the road from local residents groups and the City of Sydney council, with considerable coverage from The Sydney Morning Herald.

The South Sydney SOS Campaign Committee was a "coalition of residents from the Redfern Aboriginal Community, Waterloo, Redfern, Chippendale, Alexandria, Darlington, Ultimo-Pyrmont Erskineville & Beaconsfield areas" with the aim to oppose the "Southern Road System", protect suburbs from the road system, and ensure better alternatives were introduced. SOS sent letters to Laurie Brereton, Bob Carr, MSJ Keys Young (Urban Planning Consultants), Mr. G. Potter, and the council. The SOS group collected detailed traffic counts in March 1987 and March 1988, disputing official traffic counts.

=== Criticism in 1984 ===
In May 1984, the City of Sydney council convened a meeting to discuss implementation of "virtually the same proposal". The SOS group described the meeting as "hostile" claimed the meeting rejected the proposal.

=== Criticism in 1986 ===
On April 28 1986 Laurie Brereton announced the project to the press.

In May 1986, the ALP alderman Margaret Barry on City of Sydney Council accused the State Government of building 'freeways by stealth'

On June 1 1986, 150 people expressed "outright opposition" at a public meeting of the South Sydney (Committee of the) Australian Assistance Plan. It was resolved at the meeting to call on the Minister for Environment and Planning, Bob Carr, to order a public inquiry and release an environmental impact statement on the read development. The SOS Committee was set up and "authorised" at this meeting.

A mid-1986 article in the Inner Voice magazine ("Residents Oppose Southern Arterial Paired roads") detailed public opposition. It states "some 100 South Sydney residents at a public meeting in early June declared their outright opposition to the NSW Government's $12 million Southern Arterial to link Pyrmont with St. Peters". Concerns included that the proposal would "increase the volume, size and speed of traffic, thus increasing traffic hazards, but also increasing noise and air pollution". It also refers to the proposal as the 'Paired One-Way Road System' and calls for an EIS to be prepared.

In 1986 residents and businesses in Pyrmont, Ultimo and Chippendale commissioned an independent report assessing the impact of traffic proposals by the DMR in these suburbs. This report found the traffic management proposal for Ultimo, Pyrmont, Chippendale, and the associated DMR proposals were inadequate because no broad alternatives or the role of public transport were considered. The report recommended the DMR not proceed with the traffic management scheme as planned. Council Aldermen Michael Mobbs and Bill Hunt called on the Minister for Roads Laurie Brereton to abandon his plans for the southern road system, announced in April. This study criticised (as the NRMA had also done) the Government's alternative plans for one-way traffic on Harris, Regent, Wattle and Abercrombie streets as short-term solutions to a much larger problem. The study says there were cheaper alternatives to the Glebe Island arterial road and that money committed to it "could be better utilised in developing a Southern Arterial route which has been proposed in no less than seven separate studies", though a separate article states it criticism of the "traffic management proposal for Ultimo, Pyrmont, Chippendale, and the associated DMR proposals" because the proposal was "only a low-cost scheme and short-term with few if any benefits" and a "lack of longer-term planning and need for a southern arterial corridor."

Other critical articles in the Inner Voice journal include "Roads 2000" in June/July 1986.

=== Criticism in 1987 ===
The NRMA's deputy chief engineer criticised the southern arterial for being a short-term solution, but called for major new roads: "the Government's plans for one-way traffic on Harris, Abercrombie, Regent and Wattle streets represented an improvement, but were only a short-term solution, calling for a "major bypass route for north–south traffic to go through Darling Harbour on the western side. Residents of Pyrmont and Ultimo formed an action group named UPROAR - Ultimo-Pyrmont Residents Opposed to Arbitrary Redevelopment.

Director of NSW Traffic Authority Harry Camkin wrote an article on January 16th to claim the "tremendous traffic snarls" foreshadowed by Jonathan Falk would like be in the absence of effective planning, of which one mention was "...traffic improvements on Harris/Wattle and the Botany/Wyndham streets corridor are planned...".

On 19 January 1987, Alderman Michael Mobbs wrote to the Sydney Morning Herald to criticise a January 16 letter by Mr H. Camkin as "an inadequate response to informed public criticism". This letter states the "Traffic Authority does not answer criticism of the Government's failure to accept those recommendations seen by its traffic consultants as fundamental to the success of the Darling Harbour Project", including, along with limiting car parking at Darling Harbour, "to build a southern arterial beside the rail line along the Darling Harbour site to keep regional traffic out of Haymarket, Pyrmont and Ultimo's narrow streets and separate it from the heavy Parramatta Road traffic."

The SOS group claimed none of their concerns were addressed in the EIS released on March 2 1987.

SOS claimed their measurements of peak hour traffic volumes on Gibbons Street and Regent Street were 27% to 31% above current volumes in Fig 4.2 of the EIS.

In 1987 there were fears of "traffic chaos" due to the Darling Harbour redevelopment. A July 5 article states that Jonathan Falk, author of the independent report commissioned by residents, criticised the Darling Harbour Authority for only focusing on short-term solutions, and that there would be "tremendous traffic snarls" due to a lack of long-term planning.

On 17 July 1987, a group of 60 demonstrators opposed to the proposed southern arterial traffic link blocked traffic in Redfern for an hour. The South Sydney residents marched to the middle of Regent Street at 1pm with banners and placards. The demonstrators were members of Save Our Suburbs (SOS). One demonstrator, Rev Harry Smart, said "We have tried all other methods to make ourselves heard - letters, phone calls - but it did not work and so now we must do this." Some drivers shouted abuse at the demonstrators and police asking the demonstrators to clear the road, were delayed by the protest. No arrests were made.

=== Criticism in 1988 ===
A 1988 newspaper article was titled "Road Plan Will Divide Redfern". The Save Our Suburbs spokesperson Chris Peken was quoted as saying "They're putting freeway conditions through the middle of a densely populated community". A community member Lisa Clement claimed that "Residents in the area already have cracks in their walls because of continual heavy traffic". A "local activist" Margaret Barry is quoted stating that "It's crazy to bring more traffic into the city," and that "We should be upgrading public transport systems instead and using rail systems for freight". The article also states "The Aboriginal Legal Centre will be demolished to make way for the freeway", that "Residents in this area [Chippendale] will be isolated" and that "Businesses in this area [within the one-way pair south of Cleveland Street] will be badly affected". Chris Peken stated "It's disastrous for the small businesses trapped in between".

During an election highlight on transport in 1988, the Sydney Morning Herald posed questions to local candidates. The response of Clover Moore on the Southern Arterial Route, then campaigning as an Independent for Bligh, was:

The southern arterial route from Darling Harbour to the south-west, opposed by the elected City Council, is a "Claytons" freeway, cutting a swathe though Pyrmont, Ultimo and Redfern and Waterloo, and causing major environmental problems and destroying historic buildings.

Other critical articles in the Inner Voice journal include "SOS on SOUTHERN ARTERIAL" in December 1988

=== Criticism in 1989 ===
The South Sydney Community Transport Committee of the South Sydney Community Aid Co-Op was continuously involved in the Save Our Suburbs (S.O.S) campaign to prevent the development of the twin-roads proposal from Pyrmont to Alexandria.

This involvement included considerable local effort in tabulating statistics of road usage, presentation of submissions and direct action in the form of protests and transport stoppages. The City of Sydney Archives hold the records of the South Sydney Community Aid group.

=== Criticism in 1992 ===
In May 1992, a newspaper article was titled "Road 'will cut Redfern in two'". The South Sydney Transport Group (SSTG) claimed Regent Street will become a "virtual freeway". Jack Carnegie, the convenor of the SSTG, said the new system would increase traffic in an area already burdened by vehicles and smog, and that "It will cut a swathe through Redfern — the community will be cut in two". He also stated Waterloo was also one of the poorest suburbs in Sydney had a large number of elderly residents, many of them public housing tenants, whose lives would be endangered by increased pollution and traffic. Transport planners at the council said that, while the changes were a fait accompli, the council would push for a pedestrian mall and "slow traffic zone" near Redfern station to mitigate its impact. A spokesperson for the RTA claimed that "upgraded traffic signals and new pedestrian crossings would actually make the area safer". The article states that plans for the southern arterial road were initiated during the reign of Laurie Brereton, the Federal MP for Kingsford Smith at the time of the article.

On 11 June 1992, The Eastern Herald published a letter titled "Southern Arterial must be stopped" (dated May 31) by a local resident named M. Moffat (living on Buckland Street, Alexandria). This letter claimed the arterial is based on road plans developed 30 years ago and "resurrected (not initiated) by L. Brereton".

On 16 June 1992, a newspaper article titled "Residents aim to block new road" stated that residents were considering a legal challenge to stop stage two of the Southern Arterial Road System, alleging that the environmental study for the project is out of date. The coordinator of South Sydney Community Aid Jack Carnegie, stated "Direct action against the Southern Arterial Road System is planned". The article states "In 1987, residents blockaded Regent Street in a protest against stage one of the road." The Mayor of the City of South Sydney said the "council had been opposed to the RTA plans in the beginning but had resolved to work with them to get the best deal for the residents". Requests the council made to the RTA were "providing a pedestrian zone to Redfern station, a tunnel under Lawson Square and a right-hand turn from Regent Street into Cleveland Street. He said "All we got was the pedestrian zone," and "We are still pushing for the rest." He also raised concerns that children were running across Wyndham Street to Alexandria Park. Local resident Vanessa Grimley (who had lived on Wyndham Street for eight years), said she has seen one of her neighbour's children knocked over by a car and that "Making Wyndham Street one-way will make the traffic faster." The diagram of the Proposed Southern Arterial in this article still depicted two-way traffic south of Henderson Road. Local residents followed through on their direct action and stood in front of cars on the opening Sunday.

A Sydney Morning Herald article on 25 June 1992 covered backlash to the opening of Stage 2 of the southern arterial road through Redfern ("Row erupts as southern road opens"). This article stated the EIS was "completed amid controversy in 1987", and that opponents state "there has already been a marked increase in the volume and speed of traffic through Redfern since last Sunday". The South Sydney Transport Group convenor Jack Carnegie said the State Government and the RTA should never have considered placing the road through an area already choked with smog, with a large number of elderly residents, and with one of the lowest car ownership rates in Sydney. An RTA spokesman denied that extra traffic generated by the third runway, the harbour tunnel and an influx of thousands of new inner-city residents under the city west strategy would have "any significant impact" on the southern arterial.

Critical articles in the Inner Voice journal include "Traffic Chaos in Redfern" in Winter 1992.

=== Criticism in 1993 ===
Critical articles in the Inner Voice journal in 1993 include "Southern Arterial Grinds to a Halt" in Winter 1993 and "A Solution in Search of a Problem?" in Spring 1993.

In 1993 The Reverend F.T. Turvey, a retired minister of the Uniting Church and Chairman of the Environmental Sub-committee of the South Sydney Community Aid Co-Op, condemned the inhumanity of the Southern Arterial traffic system increasing the volume and speed of traffic through Redfern and Alexandria. He wrote that road transport systems are a major cause of suffering imposed on local residents and visitors to South Sydney.

== Safety ==
There are frequent crashes, including fatal crashes, along the route.

Harris Street "has high accident rates involving pedestrians" and residents "report pedestrian safety risks due to large volumes of fast-moving through traffic". In 2012, Alex Greenwich requested Gladys Berejiklian (the Minister for Transport at the time) to reduce the speed of Harris Street from 50km/h to 40km/h. The Government did not consider reducing the speed limit "as it is a major state road".

On May 12 2026, a person driving a truck struck a woman in her 80s who was walking on Harris Street. The woman died at the scene.

== Current Status and Future ==
There is no current public Transport for NSW position on the extension or removal of the Southern Arterial Route (reversal to two-way operation).

In the City of Sydney Council meeting on 20 June 2022, the council carried a motion to support the removal of the one-way pair of Regent Street and Gibbons Street and reinforce the high street character of Regent Street, however acknowledges TfNSW is the public authority responsible for managing the state roads. It states A key recommendation is the removal of the Gibbons Street / Regent Street one-way pair operation and the reinstatement of two-way traffic flow. It states TfNSW's submission notes "the conversion of the existing one way pairs would require a separate detailed investigation to determine the feasibility and implications for the existing and future transport network".

The planning documents for the Sydney Gateway Project state that as a result of its construction "O’Riordan Street and Botany Road will carry around 30% less traffic in 2026".

A letter detailing a transport impact assessment for a nearby development states that "Sydney Gateway Road Project would result in a reduction in daily traffic by 30%-31% on O’Riordan Street and 26%-28% on Botany Road", and that this would justify the reallocation of signal timing.

The Future Transport 2056 transport strategy included that "Extension of the Botany Road / Wyndham Street one- way pair to Mascot (via O’Riordan Street / Botany Road)" as part of the "Transport Network Assumptions" in the "Economic scenario".

== Related studies and projects ==
=== Western Distributor Road Network Improvements ===
In August 2022 Transport for NSW published the Review of Environmental Factors for the "Western Distributor Road Network Improvements" project. Primary goals of the project were to increase road "operational efficiency", increase "efficiency at local intersections" and to "reduce queues" (for cars).

On 15 November 2023, the pedestrian crossing at Harris Street south of Allen Street was removed. The crossing was removed to improve intersection efficiency. This had the effect of increasing vehicle capacity from the Anzac Bridge onto the Southern Arterial southbound.

MP Alex Greenwich described the project as representing "more 1950s road planning".

The City of Sydney submission did not support the project. It stated that due to the removed crossing, people wanting to cross the southern leg of Allen Street / Harris Street would have to make three separate crossings, potentially increasing their delay by up to three minutes. The potential benefit to cars was modelled to be 8 seconds in the AM peak.

=== Sydney Metro - Waterloo Station Transport Impact Assessment ===
While the Sydney Metro - Waterloo Station Transport Impact Assessment did not make any recommendation to remove or extend the one-way pair, it includes discussion of the transport modelling and signalling requirements for the one-way pair. It stated "these modelling results are sensitive to signal settings and cycle times. SIDRA has optimised the phasing to produce the least vehicle delay with a cycle time of 130 seconds for both signalised intersections. In reality shorter cycle times would result in improved pedestrian performance but increased delay for vehicles".

=== Sydney Metro City & Southwest: Chatswood to Sydenham Conditions of Approval ===
As the Waterloo station sits adjacent to the Southern Arterial Route, some of the intersections are captured by Condition of Approval D12 of the Sydney Metro City & Southwest project.

Condition D12 states:

D12: Traffic on local roads around each station must be monitored 12 months before the CSSI commences operation and for a period of no less than 12 months after commencement of operation. If monitoring indicates unacceptable traffic intrusion on local roads/streets as a result of operation of the CSSI beyond those that could reasonably be predicted in the EIS and/or Interchange Access Plan(s) in Condition E92, appropriate traffic management measures to mitigate the monitored impacts must be implemented following consultation with the Sydney Coordination Office and Relevant Road Authorities.

This requirement was interpreted in the Block 1 Report as measuring and preserving the vehicle Level of Service metric at nearby intersections. Relevant intersections for the Southern Arterial Route are Botany Road at Henderson Road/Raglan Street and Botany Road at Buckland/Wellington Streets.

=== Intersection Improvements at Regent Street and Cleveland Street ===
In January 2025, Transport for NSW announced a project for "improving safety and efficiency" at the intersection of Regent Street and Cleveland Street in Chippendale. This project added an additional Slip lane for vehicles turning left from Regent Street into Cleveland Street (ie. northbound along the Southern Arterial Route). Construction began on January 13 and took 15 days.

This was carried out under the TfNSW Network Efficiency Program, which includes "upgrades to traffic signals, turn bays, and intersections to improve travel times and congestion".

=== WestConnex IWT BBJV report ===
Changing traffic patterns on the Southern Arterial was mentioned in two options (one unbuilt, one dismissed) in an early report discussing Inner West Tunnel portals preceding a detailed business case for WestConnex. This was one of multiple engagements regarding this topic by Roads & Maritime Services in 2012 and 2013.

The City Road functionality plug-in was designed to add ramps and portals from the WestConnex tunnel to City Road (west of Cleveland Street). One reason this option was not pursued was that it changes traffic patterns for drivers approaching the city by "directing M5 traffic away from the southern arterial approaches to the CBD towards the Broadway approach".

An alternative "plug-in" is the South Sydney IWT ramps to Henderson Road, which were designed to improve accessibility between the Inner West Tunnel and the southern approaches to the city. Henderson Street was described as a road with "direct access through to Australian Technology Park and the southern arterial one-way pairs of Wyndham Street (northbound) and Regent Street (southbound)."

=== Infrastructure Opportunities Plan (2026) ===
The 2026 Greater Sydney Infrastructure Opportunities Plan included a number of projects eligible for in-kind funding to support delivery of medium and high density housing. This plan includes a number of intersection upgrades along the Southern Arterial Route.

The upgrade at McEvoy Street and Botany Road is expected to be completed in 2026 at a cost of $18 million. This intersection is also on the Alexandra to Moore Park Project (A2MP) corridor.

It also includes upgrades to "Improve pedestrian safety, priority and amenity" at Bay Street and Broadway and at Broadway and Wattle Street.
