= Harris Street =

Street in Sydney, Australia

Harris Street, inner Sydney New South Wales
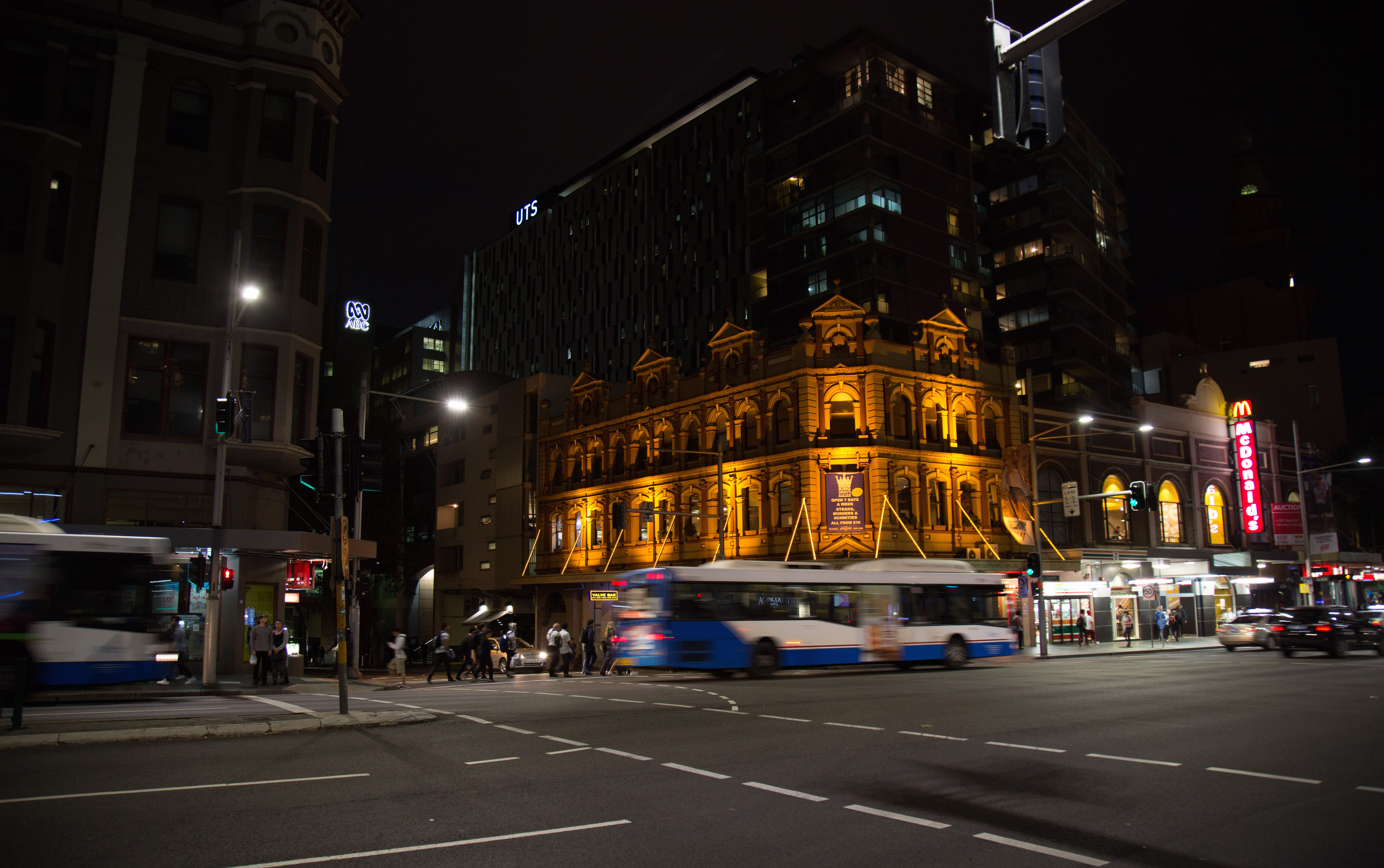
- George Street, looking towards the Harris Street intersection through to the left (by the bus). The Verve Bar is on the corner.
- Coordinates: 33°51′56″S 151°11′30″E (North end); 33°53′02″S 151°12′08″E (South end)

General information
- Type: Street
- Length: 2.2 km (1.4 mi)
- Former route number: Metroad 2 (1993–2007); State Route 11 (1990–1992); National Route 1 (1986–1992) (through Ultimo)

Major junctions
- North end: No through road Pyrmont, Sydney
- Bowman Street; Pyrmont Bridge Road; Western Distributor; Fig Street; William Henry Street; George Street; Broadway
- South end: Regent Street; Ultimo, Sydney

Location(s)
- Suburb(s): Pyrmont, Ultimo

Harris Street is the main thoroughfare in the Inner West suburbs of Pyrmont and Ultimo in Sydney, New South Wales, Australia. It runs from the northern tip of the Pyrmont peninsula to Broadway in the central business district. Harris Street was formerly lined by industrial sites such as the Ultimo Power Station, Ultimo Tram Depot and the Government Printing Office. South of Pyrmont Bridge Road, it forms part of the Southern Arterial Route.

However, redevelopment of Pyrmont from a largely industrial suburb to a more residential and commercial precinct has seen the University of Technology, Sydney and the Australian Broadcasting Corporation call Harris Street home. Until the late 1950s electric trams ran down the length of Harris Street, when they were replaced by bus services.

As part of the Western Distributor, in May 1980 Harris Street was converted to one way in a northerly direction from Fig Street to Union Street; it returned to a two-way street in 1995 after the Western Distributor was extended via the Anzac Bridge. On 13 December 1987, Harris Street was converted to one way southbound from Mary Ann Street to Broadway as part of the opening of Stage 1 of the Southern Arterial Route.

== Safety ==
Harris Street "has high accident rates involving pedestrians" and residents "report pedestrian safety risks due to large volumes of fast-moving through traffic". In 2012, Alex Greenwich requested Gladys Berejiklian (the Minister for Transport at the time) to reduce the speed of Harris Street from 50km/h to 40km/h. The Government did not consider reducing the speed limit "as it is a major state road".

On May 12 2026, a person driving a truck struck a woman in her 80s who was walking on Harris Street. The woman died at the scene.

== See also ==
- Southern Arterial Route
- Anzac Bridge
