= Michael Mobbs =

Australian writer

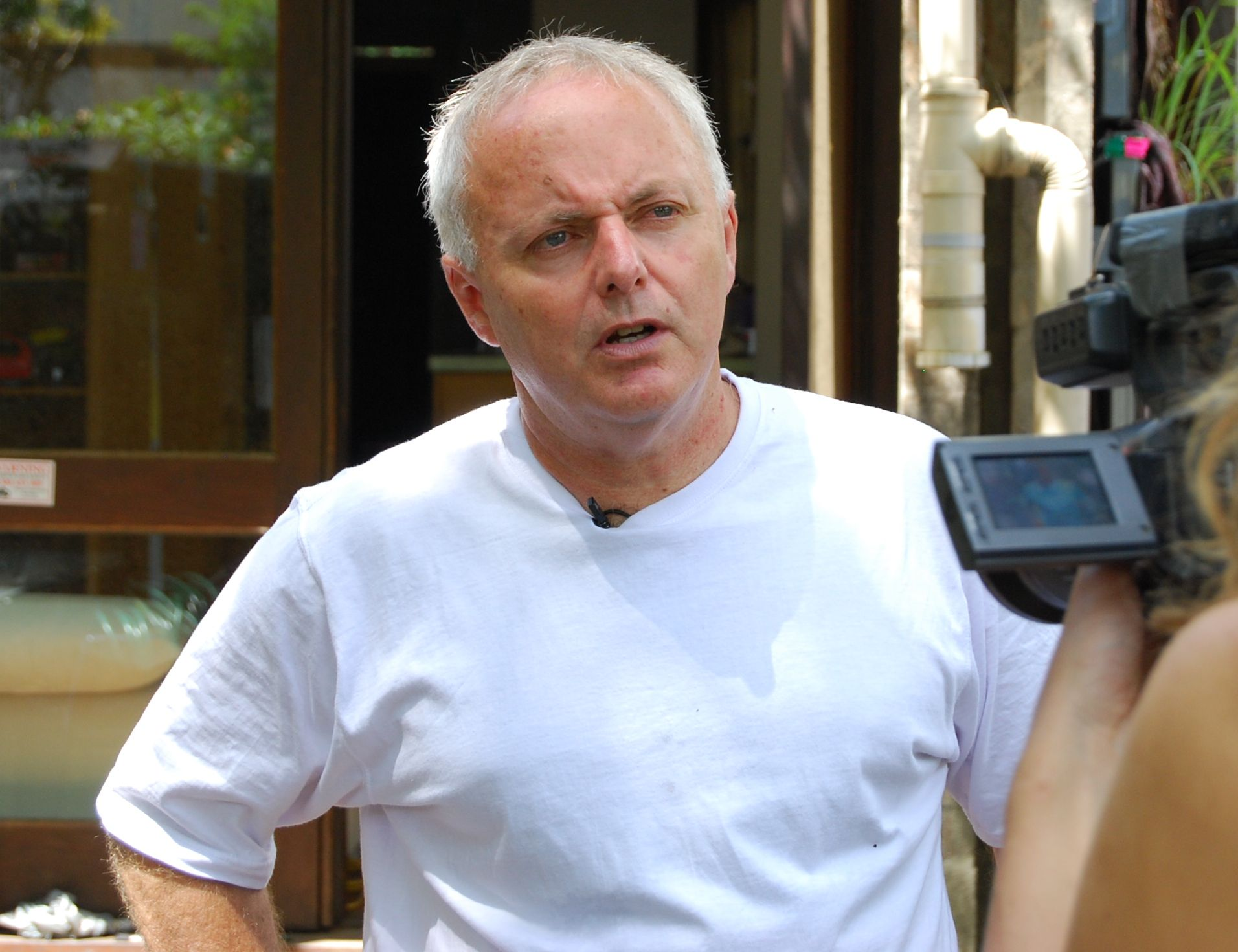
- Born: 6 June 1950
- Occupations: Author and sustainability consultant
- Website: sustainablehouse.com.au

Michael Mobbs is a Sydney-based author and environmental consultant. He graduated from the Australian National University with a Bachelor of Laws in 1975 and then worked as an environmental lawyer for 19 years. Through this work he developed an interest in sustainability. Mobbs served as an Independent Alderman on the City of Sydney Council from 1985 to 1987. In the 1990s Mobbs converted his Chippendale home into a more sustainable house by modifying the water, energy and waste systems. He regularly opens his house for guided public tours.

In 2009, The (Sydney) Magazine listed Michael Mobbs as one of Sydney's 100 most influential people. He has an ongoing role in the urban food growing movement in Sydney and has been a contributor to the Chippendale verge gardens.

== Books ==
- Sustainable House: Living for our futures. Marrickville, NSW: Choice Books. 1998. ISBN 094727748X.
- Sustainable House. Sydney, NSW: UNSW Press. 2010. ISBN 9781920705527.
- Sustainable Food: Growing food in the city. Sydney, NSW: NewSouth Publishing. 2012. ISBN 9781920705541.
