= Roads & Traffic Authority =

Government agency in New South Wales, Australia

Roads and Traffic Authority
- RTA logo from 1989 until 2009

Statutory authority overview
- Formed: 16 January 1989
- Preceding agencies: Department of Main Roads; Department of Motor Transport; Traffic Authority
- Dissolved: 31 October 2011
- Superseding Statutory authority: Roads and Maritime Services Transport for NSW
- Jurisdiction: New South Wales
- Headquarters: Sydney
- Employees: 7.523 (June 2011)
- Annual budget: A$4.8 billion (2011)
- Minister responsible: Minister for Roads
- Statutory authority executive: Michael Bushby, CEO
- Key document: Transport Administration Act 1988 (NSW)
- Website: Archived link to their homepage

Logo used by RTA between 2009 and 2011, which includes the NSW government's Waratah emblem

The Roads and Traffic Authority (RTA) was an agency of the Government of New South Wales responsible for major road infrastructure, licensing of drivers, and registration of motor vehicles. The RTA directly managed state roads and provided funding to local councils for regional and local roads. In addition, with assistance from the federal government, the RTA also managed the NSW national highway system. The agency was abolished in 2011 and replaced by Roads and Maritime Services.

== History ==
The Department of Main Roads (DMR) was established in November 1932, and undertook works across New South Wales, including maintenance of all major roads into Sydney and programs of road reconstruction, construction, upgrading and rerouting. The DMR was also responsible for many ferries and bridges in New South Wales.

On 16 January 1989, the Department of Main Roads, Department of Motor Transport, and the Traffic Authority were amalgamated to form the Roads & Traffic Authority under the Transport Administration Act, No. 109, 1988 (NSW).

On 1 November 2011, the Roads & Traffic Authority merged with NSW Maritime to become Roads & Maritime Services (RMS). Planning and co-ordination functions were transferred to Transport for NSW. On 1 December 2019 the RMS was dissolved by act of parliament and merged with Transport for NSW.

== Regions of the RTA ==
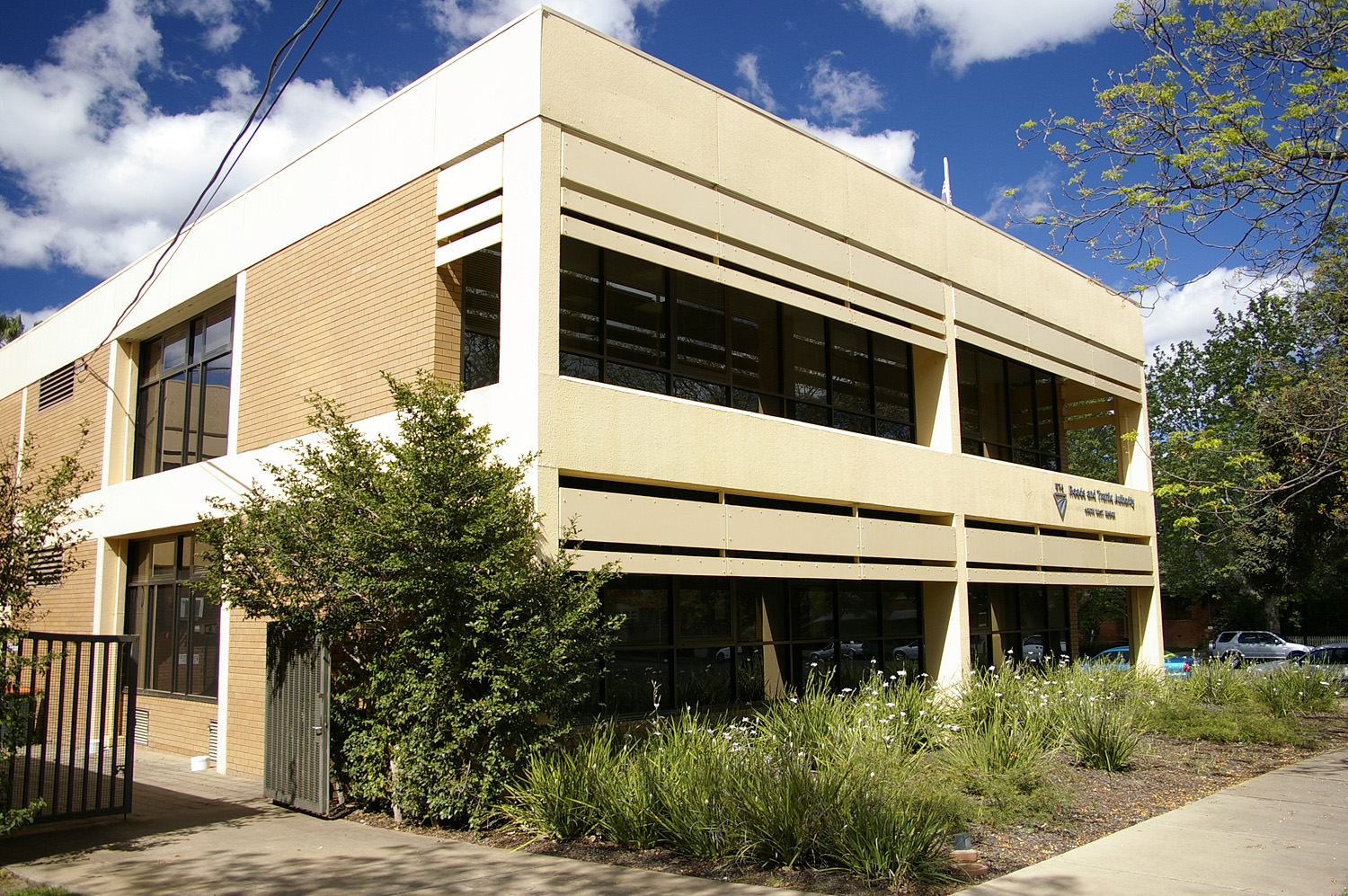
RTA South West Region offices in Wagga Wagga

The Roads & Traffic Authority was divided into six regions:

- Sydney region encompassed the area of the Sydney metropolitan and the Blue Mountains areas
- The Hunter Region encompassed the Hunter Region, Central Coast and the southern portion of the Mid North Coast
- Northern Region extended from about Taree to the Queensland border, and goes as far inland as Tamworth, called "New England"
- Southern Region encompassed the land south east of the ACT and the Illawarra area near Wollongong
- South West Region encompassed essentially the land west of the Australian Capital Territory to the South Australia border, extending from the Murray River up to around West Wyalong called the Riverina
- Western Region encompassed the remaining section in the west and north west of the state

== Functions ==
The Roads & Traffic Authority had managed 4,787 bridges and 17,623 km (10,950 mi) of state roads and highways, including 3,105 km (1,929 mi) of national highways, and employed 6,900 staff in more than 180 offices throughout NSW, including 129 Motor Registries Offices.

=== Vehicle registration ===
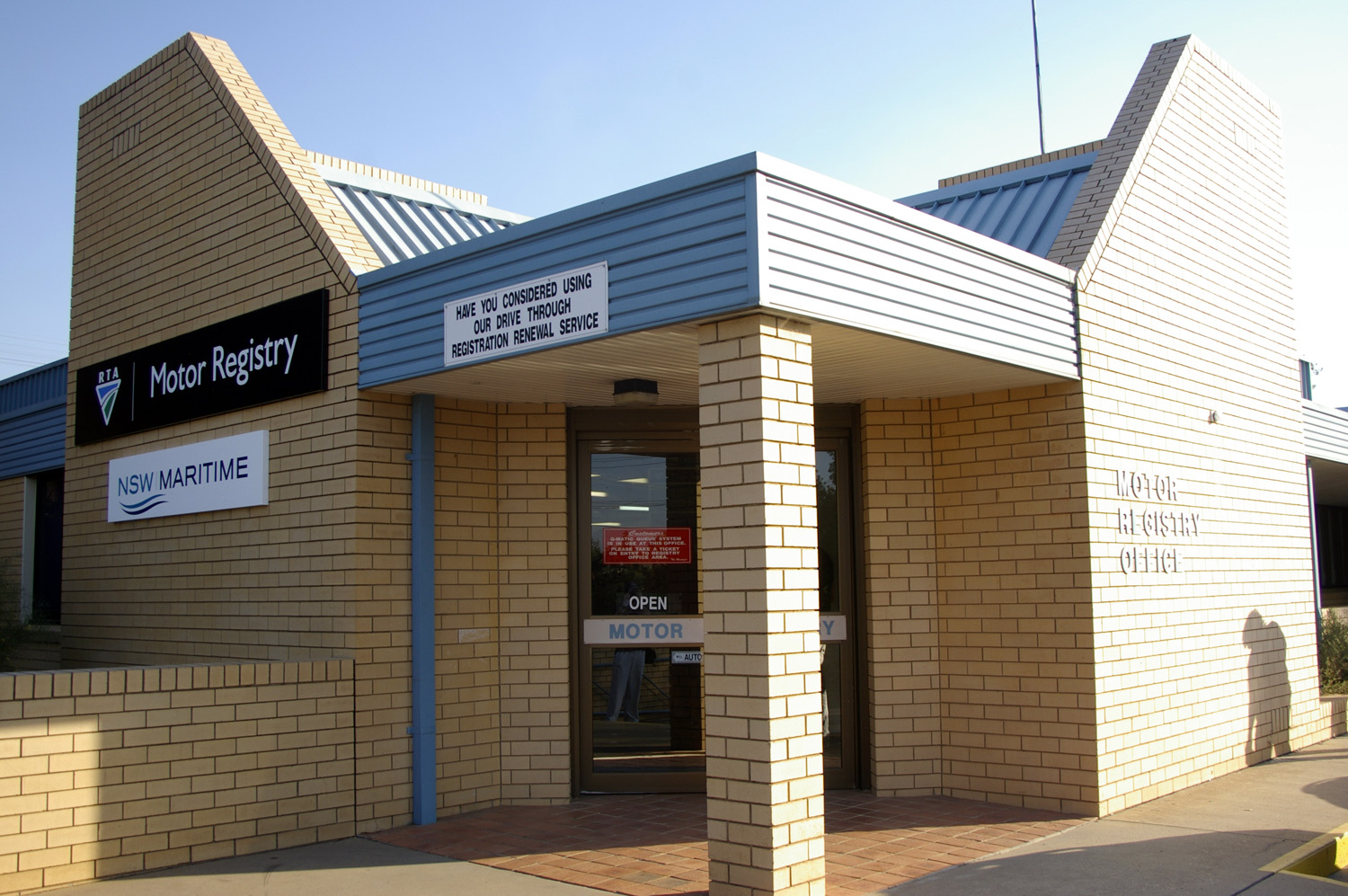
RTA Motor Registry Office in Wagga Wagga

The RTA was responsible for the registration of vehicles (including the issuing of registration plates) and the issuing of drivers licences in New South Wales, including testing and administering of licences. Additionally, the RTA produced photo cards for identification of non-drivers and issued photographic firearms licences for the New South Wales Police Firearms Registry, security licences for the New South Wales Police, Commercial Agents & Private Inquiry Agents cards and mobility parking permits.

=== Major incident response ===
Within NSW, the Transport Management Centre was responsible for managing special events and unplanned incidents and disseminating information to motorists. It is the central point for identifying and directing the response to incidents such as crashes, breakdowns and spills. It passes on information to the public through the media, the RTA call centre and variable message signs along routes.

In 1999 the NSW Transport Management Centre (TMC) established Traffic Commander and Traffic Emergency Patrol (TEP) services throughout the Greater Urban Area of Sydney to provide 24-hour 365-day-a-year coverage to "Manage the traffic arrangements around an incident scene and return the road to normal operating conditions with the utmost urgency."

Traffic commanders took command of traffic management arrangements at an incident (such as a motor vehicle collision) and liaise with other response agencies such as the police, and assist in clearing the road and minimising the effects and disruption to traffic. Traffic Emergency Patrols vans patrolled major road routes and respond to unplanned incidents with the aim of returning the road to normal operating conditions as soon as possible. Both traffic commanders and TEP units carry a wide array of traffic management devices such as traffic cones, barrier boards and road signage. Both also are permitted to use and display red and blue emergency lighting and are designated as 'emergency vehicles'.

=== Completed projects ===
- Dual carriageway completion on the whole Hume Highway and the Great Western Highway (between Sydney and Katoomba only).
- Lawrence Hargrave Drive
- North Kiama Bypass
- Sydney Orbital Network (including Westlink M7, Cross City Tunnel, Lane Cove Tunnel, Western Distributor, General Holmes Drive, M4 Motorway, Southern Cross Drive, Sydney Harbour Bridge, Sydney Harbour Tunnel, Cahill Expressway, M5 Motorway, M2 Hills Motorway, Gore Hill Freeway, Warringah Freeway and Eastern Distributor).

=== Ferry services ===
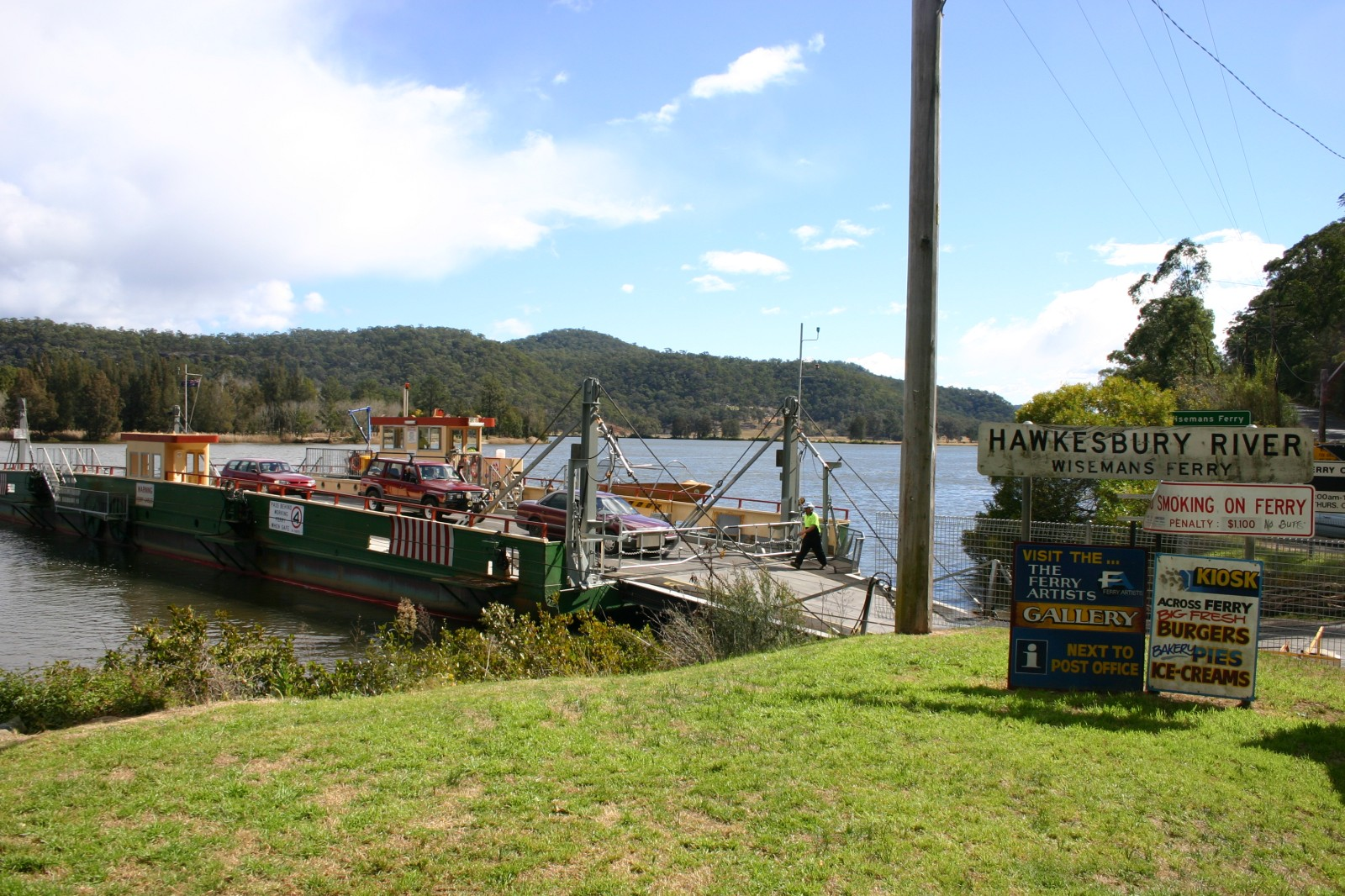
Wisemans Ferry

The RTA was responsible for the provision of several car ferries, all of which were toll-free, including:

- Berowra Waters Ferry, across Berowra Waters
- Lawrence Ferry, across the Clarence River
- Mortlake Ferry, across the Parramatta River in Sydney
- Sackville Ferry, across the Hawkesbury River near the village of Sackville
- Speewa Ferry, across the Murray River between New South Wales and Victoria
- Ulmarra Ferry, across the Clarence River
- Webbs Creek Ferry, across the Hawkesbury River in the village of Wisemans Ferry
- Wisemans Ferry, across the Hawkesbury River in the village of Wisemans Ferry
- Wymah Ferry, across the Murray River between New South Wales and Victoria

=== Criticism ===
The Citizen's Advocate for the proposed Stage 3 of the Southern Arterial Route claimed in 1993 that "some RTA personnel" have confidence that "not enough people care enough for there to be any danger of their plans not being realised."

The NRMA criticised the RTA for planning to reduce the length of transit lanes by 18% between 2007/08 and 2010/11, according to the RTA's 2010 report.
