= Redfern-Waterloo Authority =

Defunct agency in Australia

The Redfern Waterloo Authority, formerly the Redfern-Eveleigh-Darlington Program, was an agency of the Government of New South Wales with responsibility for the "Urban Renewal of the Built Environment, Human Services and Employment and Enterprise in Redfern-Waterloo".

The Authority was established under section 6 of the Redfern–Waterloo Authority Act 2004 on 17 January 2005.

The Authority was dissolved as per clause 3 of the Redfern–Waterloo Authority Repeal Act 2011 on 1 January 2012.
