= Waterloo metro station, Sydney =

Sydney Metro station

Waterloo
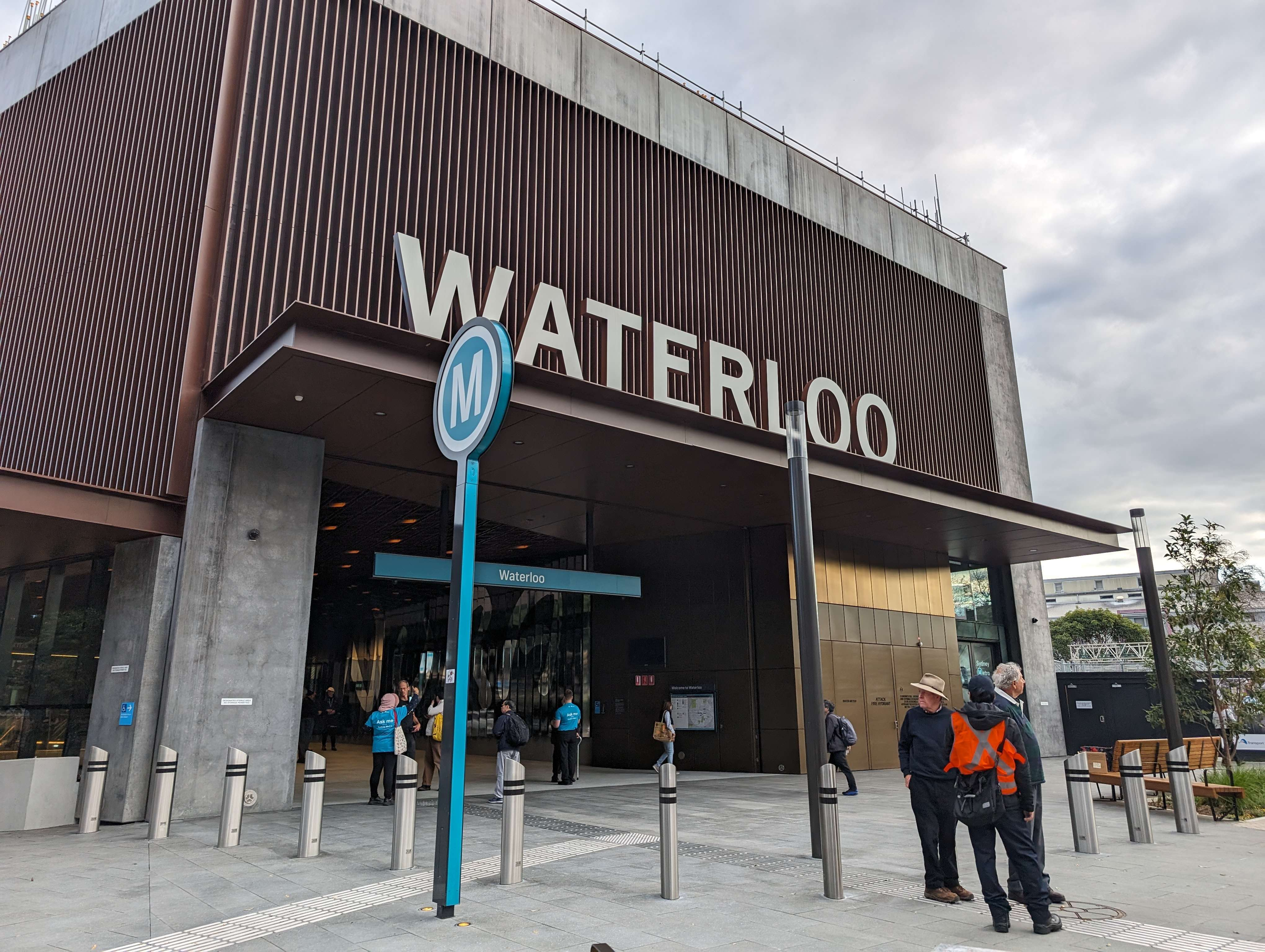
- Station building and entrance, August 2024

General information
- Location: Cnr Raglan Street & Cope Street, Waterloo
- Coordinates: 33.8975686°S 151.2001193°E
- Owner: Transport Asset Manager of New South Wales
- Operator: Metro Trains Sydney
- Line: Metro North West & Bankstown Line
- Platforms: 2
- Tracks: 2
- Connections: Bus

Construction
- Structure type: Underground
- Accessible: Yes

Other information
- Status: Open
- Website: Sydney Metro

History
- Opened: 19 August 2024

Services
Preceding station	Sydney Metro	Following station
Central towards Tallawong	M1 Metro North West & Bankstown Line	Sydenham towards Bankstown
Location

Waterloo metro station is an underground rapid transit station in Waterloo, Sydney, Australia. It forms part of the city section of the Metro North West & Bankstown Line. Consideration was given to building the line via Sydney University, however in December 2015, the State Government confirmed the line would be built via Waterloo. It opened on 19 August 2024.

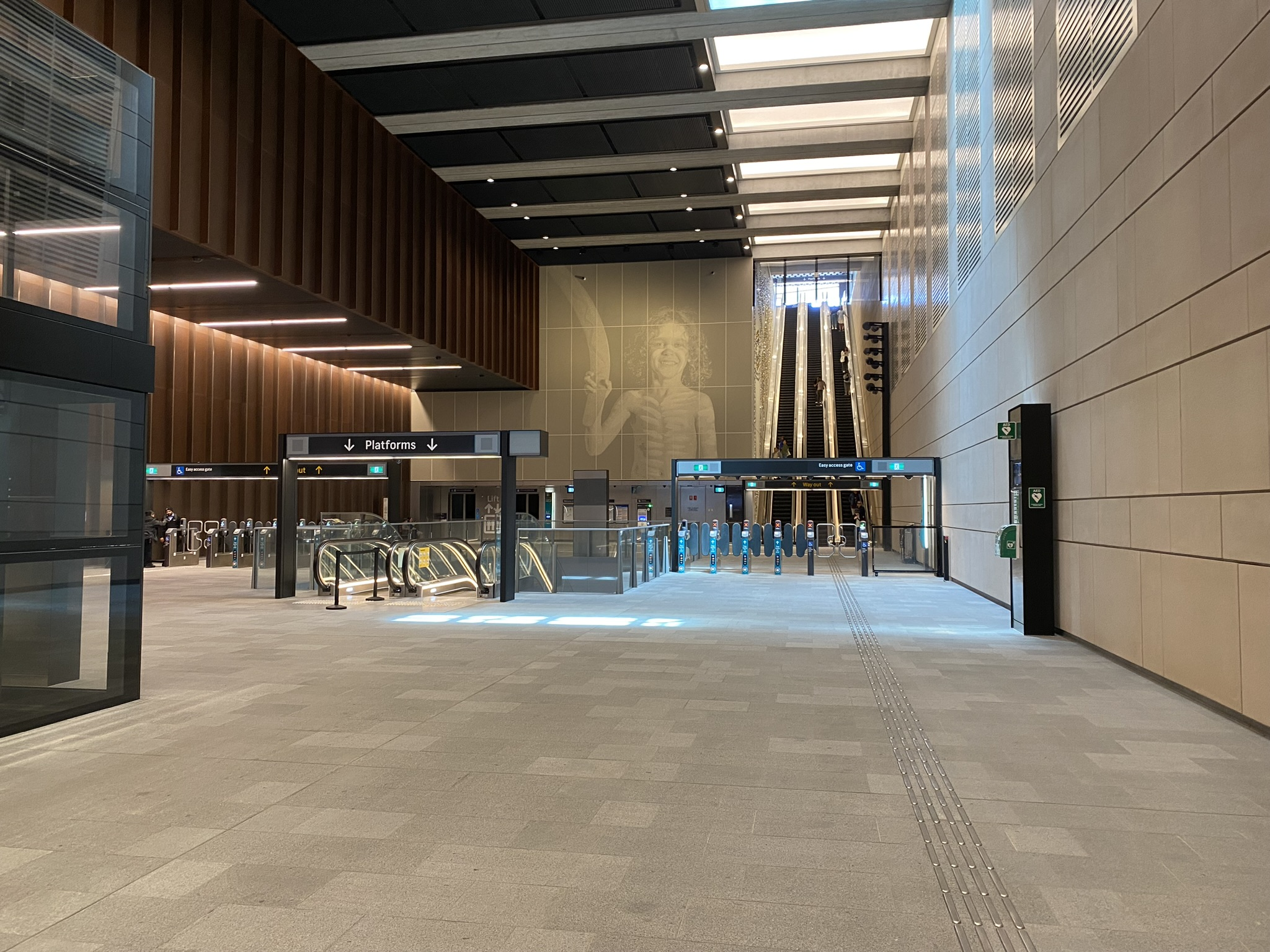
Concourse, October 2024

== Platforms and services ==
Platform	Line	Stopping pattern	Notes
1	M1 Metro North West & Bankstown Line	Services to Tallawong	
2	M1 Metro North West & Bankstown Line	Services to Bankstown	
