= Simpson-Lee House I =

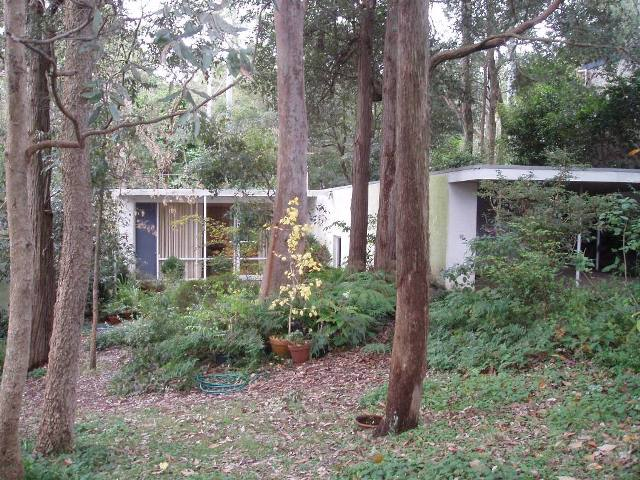
- Front of house seen through garden

- Location within Sydney Location within Australia
- 33°43′49″S 151°06′56″E
- Location: 23 Roland Avenue, Wahroonga, New South Wales, Australia

History
- Built: 1958–1962
- Built for: Professor Geelum and Mrs. Sheila Simpson-Lee

Site notes
- Architect: Arthur Baldwinson
- Architectural style: Australian modernist

New South Wales Heritage Register
- Official name: Simpson-Lee House I; Simpson Lee House
- Type: State heritage (built)
- Designated: 27 November 2009
- Reference no.: 1800
- Type: House
- Category: Residential buildings (private)
- Builder: George M. Koch (member, Master Builders' Association)

Simpson-Lee House I is a heritage-listed residence located at 23 Roland Avenue, in the Sydney suburb of Wahroonga in New South Wales, Australia. It was designed by Arthur Baldwinson and built from 1958 to 1962 by George M. Koch. It was added to the New South Wales State Heritage Register on 27 November 2009.

== History ==
=== The House ===
Simpson-Lee House I Wahroonga was commissioned by Professor Geelum and Mrs. Sheila Simpson-Lee and designed by Arthur Baldwinson in 1957. Construction took place in two stages, the first during 1958 and again in 1962. The house was small and built in two stages as it was built utilising loans available under the University Housing Scheme.

The house represents the evolution of Baldwinson's thinking beyond his earlier European influenced designs into a more site-responsive, locally adapted modernism which in this case, particularly flowed through the co-operation of literate, informed clients.

The design of the house reflects the needs and sensibility of the clients and their own sophisticated understanding of architecture even though they had no formal architectural training. The Simpson-Lees originally were drawn to the work of Sydney Ancher however Geelum's sister who worked for the Institute of Architects suggested they might like the work of Arthur Baldwinson who also happened to work with Geelum at Sydney University.

Professor and Mrs Simpson-Lee have lived in the house since it was built. Professor Simpson-Lee died but Mrs Simpson Lee remains in the house and it is retained much as it was when it was first built, including the majority of the contents. The garden has also been maintained as was originally designed.

=== The architect ===
Arthur Baldwinson (1908–1969) is one of Australia's first generation of prominent modernist architects who experienced the European modernist movement first hand. From 1932 until 1937 Baldwinson spent time in London where he worked for Maxwell Fry and as a full-time assistant to Walter Gropius, developing a unique and intimate understanding of the theories of modern architecture. This experience of working in London with two of the early twentieth century's most important architects, greatly influenced Baldwinson' s design philosophy for the remainder of his professional life working in architecture.

Baldwinson returned to Australia in 1937 determined to plant the flag of "the new architecture". Before the 1939–45 War he played a pioneer role in the formation of an Australian MARS (Modern Architecture Research Society) group, the Design and Industries Association (DIA) and the design of modernist houses drawing on his London experience.

During World War II, Baldwinson worked for the Commonwealth Aircraft Factory designing and constructing buildings for the manufacture of the Beaufort Bomber. By 1943, he was Chief Architect for the Beaufort Division. Baldwinson later developed an all-steel pre-fabricated "Beaufort" house for post-war sale to the Victorian Housing Commission in 1946. He also had his own practice and in 1938 designed the ground breaking Collins house at Palm Beach. According to Greg Holman ( Author of Thesis on Baldwinson) only the Prevost house by Sydney Ancher exhibited a similar level of understanding of the modern movement at time.

Commencing practice with Eric Gibson, an engineer in 1946, Baldwinson soon began designing what became known as the "Artists" houses. He designed houses and studios for Douglas Annand, William Dobell, Max Dupain, Geoff and Dahl Collings, Alistair Morrison, Brett Porter, Elaine Haxton, Desiderius Orban and Russell Drysdale. He concluded his partnership with Gibson in 1950 and formed a partnership with Charles Vernon Sylvester-Booth in 1953; later Charles Peters joined them in 1956 to form Baldwinson, Booth and Peters. This practice lasted until 1958. Their Hotel Belmont, in the Newcastle suburb of Belmont won the 1956 NSW RAIA Sir John Sulman Medal for a public building. Baldwinson also designed the Mandl House, Wahroonga (1953) and the Simpson-Lee House, Wahroonga (1958) during this partnership. Supported by his teaching salary, Baldwinson designed and built his own residence at 79 Carlotta Street, Greenwich (1954). Baldwinson formed a new partnership with recent Sydney University graduate Geoffrey Twibill which was to last until late 1959.

In 1960, Baldwinson closed his formal practice but continued to work on commissions. He designed the Hauslaib House, Point Piper (1960), the Pennington House, Whale Beach (1960), the Robinson House, Castle Cove (1963) and his last completed house for the artist Desiderius Orban, Northwood (1968)

He became a Senior Lecturer in the University of Sydney architecture faculty in 1952 where he remained until his death. In his later years, Baldwinson devoted himself to teaching and travel. In 1969 he died in Sydney from congestive heart failure.

A member of the first Australian generation of modernist architects, his contemporaries include Roy Grounds (1905–1981) and Frederick Romberg (1910–1992) in Victoria and Sydney Ancher (1904–1979) and Walter Bunning (1912–1977) in NSW. Their respective Australian architectural careers in modernism began in the late 1930s.

Baldwinson's palette of materials was consistent throughout his practice: bagged brick, weatherboard or horizontal tongue & groove cladding, irregular ashlar-laid sandstone and concrete. Although his practice was occasionally involved in commercial commissions, his greatest accomplishments lie in the adaptation of the principles and materials of European modernism for the small-scale suburban Australian house. He helped to pioneer free-plan concepts, the "scientific kitchen", flat roof treatments and function-derived placement of windows and doors. (RAIA Nomination)

Baldwinson is an important Australian architect, taking his place with the best of twentieth century Australian architects, such as Sydney Ancher and Harry Seidler.

== Description ==
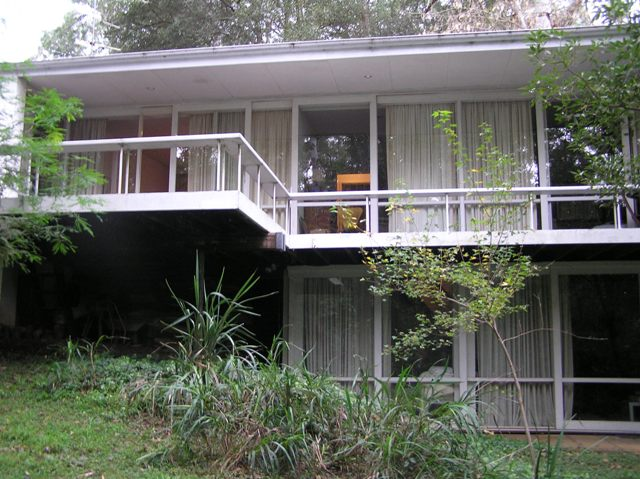
Rear elevation

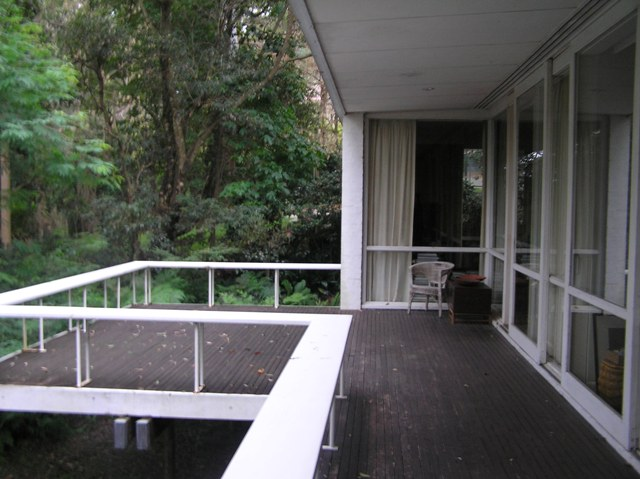
Rear deck with handrail seat

Glenn Murcutt's description of the site for Ku-ring-gai Council, 1998:

"The Roland Avenue house was commissioned by Professor Geelum and Mrs. Sheila Simpson-Lee, in 1957. Construction took place in two stages, the first during 1958 and again in 1962. As a consequence of the single continuous occupation and ownership since 1958, the house is in its original condition. It has been carefully maintained, without structural changes or changes to finishes, - and beautiful, it is! The house is modest in size, reflecting the Modernist ethic of modest housing standards of the time. Furthermore, the house is representative of Baldwinson's mature work. It is an exceptionally good example of early 1960s modern architecture in Australia. The house is in very good condition and has "aged" beautifully over the forty odd years since construction.

The building is set well back from Roland Avenue, it is superbly sited, responding to the site contours with apparent ease. The gravel surfaced pedestrian access and driveway passes through large eucalypts and other mature flora, it is angled across the depth of this long and comparatively narrow block. The setback from the Roland Avenue boundary to the house is in excess of 30 metres. This area has been generously landscaped with native and exotic trees and shrubs and provides the dominant visual element to the street. The siting minimises the building's visual impact on the streetscape and presents a discreet face to Roland Avenue. Privacy from Roland Avenue is therefore achieved for the occupants, enabling an appropriate and generous use of glass.

A planar wall forms one side of the carport and extends into the sitting room where it is punctuated by the fireplace. This wall is a very strong element and it establishes the direction of the entry and makes for containment of the paved entry courtyard. The planning is clear and it is beautifully simple.

The house is entered through the deep front garden and then alongside the strong whitewashed wall which leads to the paved entry court. The entry door - within the floor to ceiling glass wall - is directly off the entry court and leads into the sitting room via a subtle, shared entry/hallway space. The sitting and dining rooms are combined and planned so as to form a clear link to the suspended timber, western facing, deep veranda. The veranda is contained on its south by another planar wall which is an extension of the bedroom wall and to the west by a generous low level seat which in no way interrupts the connection between the veranda space and the landscape. A section of the veranda projects into the native Australian vegetation and sandstone outcropped landscape. Privacy to neighbours is achieved through the largely blank side "bagged" brick walls. The floor to ceiling glass between the entry court, sitting and dining rooms and the veranda, separates as well as connects the internal rooms to the external spaces and landscape. The kitchen and laundry share the small northern courtyard and are separated from the living spaces. The kitchen has a close and direct connection to the carport via the small courtyard. Directly off the entry, a bedroom connects with the western veranda and the small well planned bathing space serves the main house. A stair links the hall/entry space to a lower study/bedroom.

The skillion roof which extends from the carport, over the day living spaces and veranda, is a powerful and unifying element commonly used by proponents of the "Modern Movement". The section through the house responds directly and logically to the falls presented by this site.

Upper and lower level spaces connect visually and physically to the natural landscape of native plants, sandstone rocks and the gully, with ease. Walls extend from the exterior landscape to form planes defining the interior spaces. Floor to ceiling glass walls are set between solid wall planes and reinforce the connection of rooms to external spaces and to the native wooded gully landscape. The front garden and courtyards have been planted to the original design and they are now mature. The planting provides for added and necessary privacy for neighbours as well as for the occupants.

Finishes are unpretentious, being cement painted, "bagged" and rendered to solid and cavity brickwork walls. Floors are waxed narrow timber flooring boards to the upper level spaces, the kitchen left unfinished and is washed timber, with pigmented waxed concrete to the lower level spaces. The ceilings are fibrous plaster fixed to timber roof and floor construction. The colours are white externally and white to shades of grey internally with floors of warm tallow wood browns. Finishes are as originally applied and the colours substantially the same as originally scheduled.

Spatially, the house is an excellent example of a work holding to the principles of the "Modern Movement" in architecture and an exemplar of Arthur Baldwinson's architectural contribution to this country.'

=== Further information ===
The original documentation for the house including architectural drawings, specifications and colour schemes are held in the Caroline Simpson Library of the Historic Houses Trust. There is a complete collection of Arthur Baldwinson papers in the Mitchell Library.

== Heritage listing ==
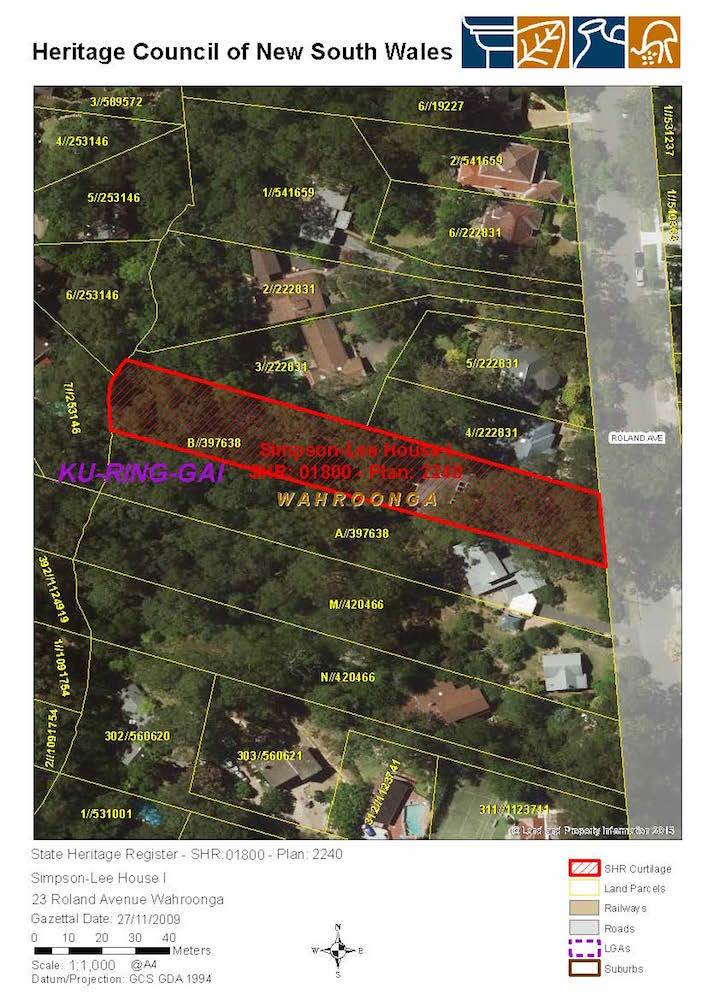
Heritage boundaries

Dating from 1957, Simpson-Lee House I Wahroonga is of State significance as an excellent and intact example of the work of early modernist architect Arthur Baldwinson. One of the earliest proponents of modernism in NSW, Baldwinson was responsible for bringing the sophistication of European modernism to Australia and developing it into a locally adapted, site responsive architecture. Having worked as assistant to international architects Walter Gropius and Maxwell Fry whilst in London, Baldwinson gained an understanding of modernism which he then translated into the Australian environment. Through his architecture and the establishment of the Modern Architecture Research Society (MARS) which he founded with Walter Bunning, Morton Herman and others he influenced his contemporaries and future generations of Australian architects.

The Simpson-Lee house represents an excellent example of Baldwinson's architecture and is likely to be the most intact of all his buildings. Demonstrating an innovative approach to the incorporation of outdoor spaces, sensitive to the environment and place, it is a benchmark house for the manner in which the interior and exterior is integrated. Simpson-Lee House I is likely to be of State significance for its research value as a resource that demonstrates many features of modernist architecture and design in theory and practice, and especially for its capacity to illuminate the work of Baldwinson. It is also likely to be of State significance for being an excellent representative example of mid twentieth century Australian modernist residential design, complete with intact interiors and garden setting. Simpson-Lee House I Wahroonga is highly regarded as an outstanding work of architecture by the architectural profession, a house which was aesthetically distinctive for its time and now exemplifies an architectural style.

Simpson-Lee House I was listed on the New South Wales State Heritage Register on 27 November 2009 having satisfied the following criteria.

The place is important in demonstrating the course, or pattern, of cultural or natural history in New South Wales.

Simpson-Lee House I Wahroonga is of State significance for its role in the history of Australian architecture and house design. As an exemplary piece of modernism springing from first hand experience with European modernism but adapted so successfully to the Australian climate it reflects changing attitudes to architecture at a residential level in mid twentieth century NSW.

The place has a strong or special association with a person, or group of persons, of importance of cultural or natural history of New South Wales's history.

Simpson-Lee House I Wahroonga is of State significance for its historical associations with the prominent modernist architect Arthur Baldwinson. One of the earliest proponents of modernism in NSW Baldwinson was responsible for bringing the sophistication of European modernism to Australia and developing it into a locally adapted, site responsive architecture. Having worked as assistant to international architects Walter Gropius and Maxwell Fry whilst in London, Baldwinson gained an understanding of modernism which he then translated into the Australian environment. Through his architecture and the establishment of the Modern Architecture Research Society (MARS) which he founded with Walter Bunning, Morton Herman and others he influenced his contemporaries and future generations of Australian architects. Also significant is the association with Geelum and Sheila Simpson-Lee, the clients, who are historically important for their role as patrons of modern architecture. The Simpson-Lee's commissioned both the house in Wahroonga by Baldwinson and a house in Mount Wilson by Glenn Murcutt which has emerged as one of his finest works to date, a factor he attributes to the contribution of his clients.

The place is important in demonstrating aesthetic characteristics and/or a high degree of creative or technical achievement in New South Wales.

Simpson-Lee House I Wahroonga is of State significance as an excellent and intact example of the work of early modernist architect Arthur Baldwinson. It is an excellent example of mid twentieth century modern domestic architecture in Australia. It has aesthetic value arising from its design, setting and completeness in presentation. The house represents the evolution of Baldwinson's thinking beyond his earlier European influenced designs into a more site-responsive, locally adapted Modernism. Demonstrating an innovative approach to the incorporation of outdoor spaces, sensitive to the environment and place, it is a benchmark house for the manner in which the interior and exterior is integrated - a theme developed by followers throughout the 1960s. Simpson-Lee House I Wahroonga is highly regarded as an outstanding work of architecture by the architectural profession, a house which was aesthetically distinctive for its time and now exemplifies a style. Glenn Murcutt has written: 'Spatially, the house is an excellent example of a work holding to the principles of the "Modern Movement" in architecture and an exemplar of Arthur Baldwinson's architectural contribution to this country. The house sits so quietly and it is entirely unpretentious.'

The place has a strong or special association with a particular community or cultural group in New South Wales for social, cultural or spiritual reasons.

Does not meet this criterion.

The place has potential to yield information that will contribute to an understanding of the cultural or natural history of New South Wales.

Simpson-Lee House I Wahroonga is of State significance for its research value as a resource that demonstrates many features of modern architecture and design in theory and practice, and especially for its capacity to illuminate the work of Baldwinson. The house also has educational potential because it is held in such high esteem by the Australian architectural fraternity including eminent architects such as Glen Murcutt who has commented on Baldwinson's achievements. There is also research potential for studying the productive relationship between the architect and the clients. Glen Murcutt has suggested that the Simpson-Lees are amongst his most knowledgeable, architecturally fluent clients.

The place possesses uncommon, rare or endangered aspects of the cultural or natural history of New South Wales.

Does not meet this criterion.

The place is important in demonstrating the principal characteristics of a class of cultural or natural places/environments in New South Wales.

Simpson-Lee House I Wahroonga is of State significance as an excellent, intact mid twentieth century example of Australian modernist residential design, complete with interiors which reflect its clients' knowledge and interest in design. Simpson-Lee House I Wahroonga is an excellent, representative and intact example of the residential work of Arthur Baldwinson, one of the first generation of Australia's prominent modernist architects. It is a defining example of the outstanding design skills of a well regarded Australian architect and which clearly demonstrates his integration of the lessons of European modernism in an Australian setting.

== See also ==
- Australian residential architectural styles
