= Wahroonga railway station =

Railway station in Sydney, New South Wales, Australia

Wahroonga
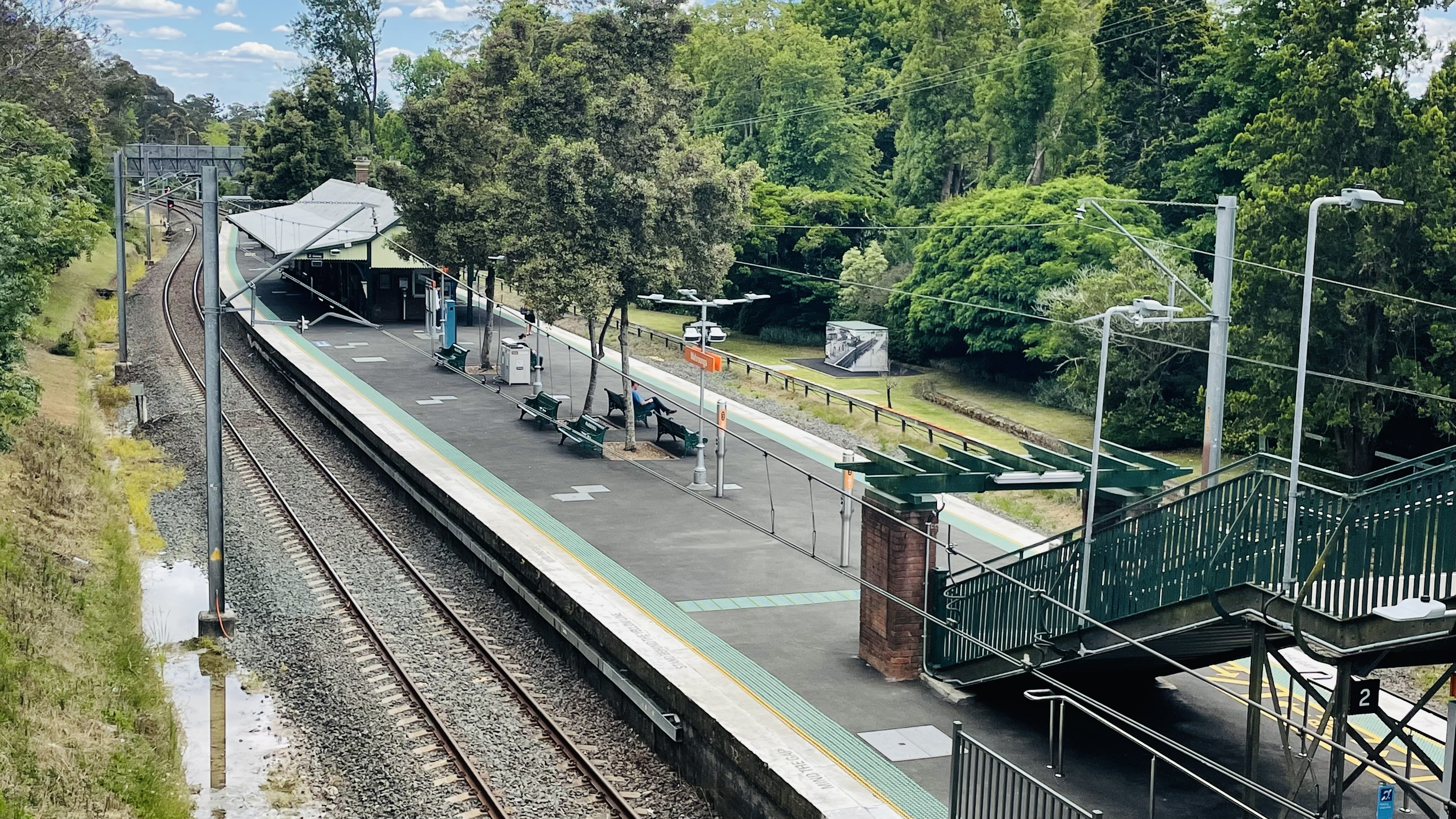
- Northbound view of platform looking at station building further up, seating and stairs, November 2022

General information
- Location: Redleaf Avenue, Wahroonga, New South Wales, Australia
- Coordinates: 33°43′03″S 151°07′01″E
- Elevation: 197 metres (646 ft)
- Owner: Transport Asset Manager of New South Wales
- Operator: Sydney Trains
- Line: North Shore
- Distance: 22.77 km (14.15 mi) from Central
- Platforms: 2 (1 island)
- Tracks: 2
- Connections: Bus

Construction
- Structure type: Ground
- Accessible: Yes

Other information
- Status: Weekdays: Staffed: 6am to 7pm: Weekends and public holidays: Staffed: 8am to 4pm
- Station code: WHG
- Website: Transport for NSW

History
- Opened: 1 January 1890 (136 years ago)
- Electrified: Yes (1927)
- Former names: Noonan's Platform (construction); Pearce's Corner (1890)

Passengers
- 2023: 899,090 (year); 2,463 (daily) (Sydney Trains, NSW TrainLink)

Services
Preceding station	Sydney Trains	Following station
Warrawee towards City	North Shore & Western Line	Waitara towards Berowra

New South Wales Heritage Register
- Official name: Wahroonga Railway Station group; Pearce's Corner; Noonan's Platform
- Type: State heritage (complex / group)
- Designated: 2 April 1999
- Reference no.: 1280
- Type: Railway Platform / Station
- Category: Transport – Rail
- Builders: E. Pritchard & Co. contractor (first 1890 line)
Location

Wahroonga railway station is a heritage-listed suburban railway station located on the North Shore line, serving the Sydney suburb of Wahroonga. It is served by Sydney Trains T1 North Shore & Western Line services. It was built from 1890 to 1910 by E. Pritchard & Co., contractor (first 1890 line). It is also known as Wahroonga Railway Station group and Pearce's Corner; Noonan's Platform. The property was added to the New South Wales State Heritage Register on 2 April 1999.

== History ==
Railway and tramway plans for the area were discussed by the authorities in the 1880s.

With the building of the North Shore Line from Hornsby to St Leonards, a station was constructed under the name Noonan's Platform due to the close proximity of a property belonging to Patrick Noonan within the new railway's boundary. The station officially opened on 1 January 1890 as Pearce's Corner. It was renamed Wahroonga only eight months later, on 30 August 1890.

At this time, Wahroonga was a short brick faced platform and small timber building located on the south side of the single line. The entire station lay south of a level crossing with then Noonan's Road, later renamed Coonanbarra Road.

The single-track North Shore railway line that went from Hornsby to St Leonards in 1890, constructed by E. Pritchard & Co. contractor, reached Milsons Point in 1893. The North Shore Ferry Company had been carrying passengers from Milsons Point to Circular Quay since the 1860s and by the 1890s around 5 million people crossed the harbour by this means every year. Offering suburban subdivisions along the railway line in advance of the stations, speculators developed Ku-ring-gai well before completion of the North Shore Bridge in 1932 set off another flurry of real estate promotion. Ku-ring-gai grew slowly in the 19th century, its population being 4,000 by 1901. However, over the next two decades its population quadrupled. By this time, with its large residences in beautiful, leafy surrounds, it had changed from a district with a dubious reputation to one that attracted people of high socio-economic status, 73 per cent of whom were home owners.

On 24 October 1901, Pymble News reported that "trees have been planted on the sides of the station. This work will add immeasurably to the attractions of Wahroonga in the eyes of visitors to the Railway Station.". These trees were California fan palms (Washingtonia filifera) & Mexican fan palms (Washingtonia filifera var. robusta).

The present station building at Wahroonga, together with the road bridge over the line and pedestrian steps at Redleaf Avenue was provided about 1906 in anticipation of the double line. A duplicated line was completed in May 1909 and the 12 mile section between Hornsby and Milson's Point was opened in early 1910. Island platforms were part of the duplication arrangements. The booking/station master's office is located in the platform building at the Sydney end adjacent to two ticket issuing windows. The pedestrian footbridge at Coonanbarra Road was built at this time when the level crossing was closed.

A new road overbridge was built on the southern end of the platform and this replaced the level crossing at the north of the station. Access to the new island platform was via a set of steps from the new overbridge. Train services continued to be steam-hauled on this line until c.1927 when alterations allowed for electrification of the line between Milson's Point and Hornsby. Automatic colour light signalling was installed between Lindfield and Hornsby (including Wahroonga) on 8 May 1928. Steam trains were withdrawn in July 1928. When the Sydney Harbour Bridge was opened on 20 March 1932, the North Shore train services connected with the rest of the Sydney suburban railway system.

The 1926 Wahroonga Progress Association's Annual Report stated the railway station garden "for 9 years in succession, with one exception, has gained first prize in the competition for privately maintained railway station gardens".

A pair of brick entrance piers were built at the foot of the pedestrian steps with timber covering in the mid-1930s, similar to the set at Killara, since demolished.

In the 1920s or 1930s, Hill's fig trees(Ficus microcarpa var. Hillii) were planted on the island platform, replacing the earlier fan palm trees. Shrubs and trees have been planted in the centre line of the platform on both sides of the centrally located building since the platform's earliest days.

In early years, Old Milson's Point, Bay Road, St. Leonards, Chatswood, Lindfield, Gordon, Pymble, Turramurra, Wahroonga and Hornsby Stations had goods yards. All but St. Leonards, Chatswood and Hornsby yards had disappeared by the mid-twentieth century, and the latter three did not survive into the late twentieth century. Grounds on the east and west of the tracks are also densely planted with a mixture of native and exotic trees and shrubs. These are maintained by Hornsby Shire Council. In 2009 the Hill's fig trees on the platform were replaced with blue berry ash (Elaeocarpus reticulatus) as the figs' roots were lifting pavement and causing trip and risk hazards. The new trees have a more upright, narrow habit which should suit the constricted corridor between the railway overhead power lines. The platform upgrade include relocation of seats and re-paving of the platform surface.

In May 2022, an upgrade to the station was completed and opened including a new lift and accessible toilet, while the Illoura Avenue bridge was also refurbished.

== Description ==
=== Landscape ===
Wahroonga station is the highest on the North Shore railway line at 189.9 metres (623 ft) AHD. What is significant about the route is the fact that the topography is steep, rising from near sea level at Kirribilli and Lavender Bay.

It is set in a cutting with elevated road and pedestrian bridges over this, connecting Wahroonga to its east and west. The main shopping centre is on its eastern side, flanked by Redleaf Park. The station and its surroundings are a superb example of the early 1900s Sydney suburban railway station architecture and design, set among gardens lovingly tended by the Ku-ring-gai Council and local residents. Until the time of the listing, (1999) the whole of the station platform, building, steps and overhead bridge were virtually unchanged from the time each unit was built.

The landscape includes:

- the whole of the station area as landscape precinct as part of larger landscape precinct in Wahroonga area
- brick walls, 1909
- 1910s – plantings to platform area and gardens around station area.

Trees (five Hill's fig trees (Ficus microcarpa var.'Hillii') and some shrubs are planted on the island platform give added importance to the pleasant visual appearance. Their presence is unique on this line and unusual in a railway setting due to the difficulty in easy maintenance where road access is not available. They date to the 1910s as evidenced in photographs.

Shrubs and trees have been planted in the centre line of the platform on both sides of the centrally located building since its earliest days.

Grounds on the east and west of the tracks are also densely planted with a mixture of native and exotic trees and shrubs. These are maintained by Ku-Ring-Gai Shire Council. There is a dense mixed planting on the eastern side's grounds. This includes the unusual large shrub, horned holly (Ilex cornuta), native cypress/Port Jackson pine (Callitris columellaris), strawberry tree (Arbutus unedo), a rare rainforest tree, the Davidson plum (Davidsonia pruriens), Camellia japonica cv.s and laurustinus (Viburnum tinus). The western side grounds plantings include a tall swamp cypress (Taxodium distichum) and a hoop pine (Araucaria cunninghamii).

=== Buildings ===
station building – type 11, initial island/side building brick, 1906

=== Structures ===
- platform faces – brick, 1906
- brick arch overbridge, 1909
- steps – steel fabricated down end, c. 1900
- pedestrian footbridge at North end of station

The station building is representative of a high quality of railway station building which was to be found elsewhere on the north shore railway line, but the environment at Wahroonga places it in a much higher category due to the complementary gardens and trees.

A footbridge across the northern end of the platform (but giving no access to it) leading to and from both sides of the Coonanbarra Road, is unusual for the Sydney suburban area. Plans have been made to construct a set of access stairs from this bridge to the platform.

The overbridge carrying Redleaf Avenue over the line at the southern end consists of concrete arches over each railway track supported by brick piers carrying the road over the railway line and brick abutments on the footpaths above and early example of this construction in Sydney.

The station complements the small shopping centre and office buildings in the surrounding streets on the southern side of the line. Two ticket collecting booths in brick stand at the foot of the Redleaf Avenue stairs dating from the 1930s and are unusual to the north shore line.

=== Condition ===
As at 14 January 2009, until the time of the listing, the whole of the station platform, building, steps and overhead bridge were virtually unchanged from the time each unit was built.

The spacing of the new trees respects a range of issues including avoiding disturbed sub-platform areas. In early years, Old Milson's Point, Bay Road, St. Leonards, Chatswood, Lindfield, Gordon, Pymble, Turramurra, Wahroonga and Hornsby Stations had goods yards. All but St. Leonards, Chatswood and Hornsby yards had disappeared by the mid-twentieth century, and the latter three did not survive into the late twentieth century.

=== Modifications and dates ===
- 1890: the first station, a short brick faced platform and small timber building, was opened south of a level crossing with the then Noonan's Road (Coonanbarra Road).
- c. 1900: the steps were steel fabricated on the down end.
- 1906: the platform faces were reconstructed with brick.
- c. 1906 the level crossing was closed when the present building, together with the road bridge over the line, Coonanbarra Road pedestrian footbridge and pedestrian steps at Illoura Avenue were built in anticipation of line duplication.
- 1909: a brick arch overbridge was built
- c. 1910: appropriate shrubs and trees were planted in the centre line of the platform on both sides of the centrally located building.
- 1930s: a pair of brick entrance piers were constructed at the foot of the pedestrian steps with timber covering, similar to Killara's (since demolished).
- 1982: SRA sealed the platform with bitumen, causing one Hill's fig tree's death and another needed much attention
- 2001: the replacement and raise in height of the bridge deck.
- 2009: the Hill's fig trees were replaced with Elaeocarpus reticulatus, and the platform itself was repaved. Platform seats were also relocated.
- 2022: the platform and bridge were refurbished, whilst the entrance was replaced and the station was made accessible with a lift.

== Services ==
=== Platforms ===
Platform	Line	Stopping pattern	Notes
1	T1	services to Epping & Hornsby via Strathfield, Richmond, Penrith & Emu Plains	
2	T1	services to Hornsby & Berowra	

=== Transport links ===
CDC NSW operates one bus route via Wahroonga station, under contract to Transport for NSW:

Illoura Avenue:

- 576: to North Wahroonga

Wahroonga station is served by one NightRide route:

- N90: Hornsby station to Town Hall station

== Gallery ==
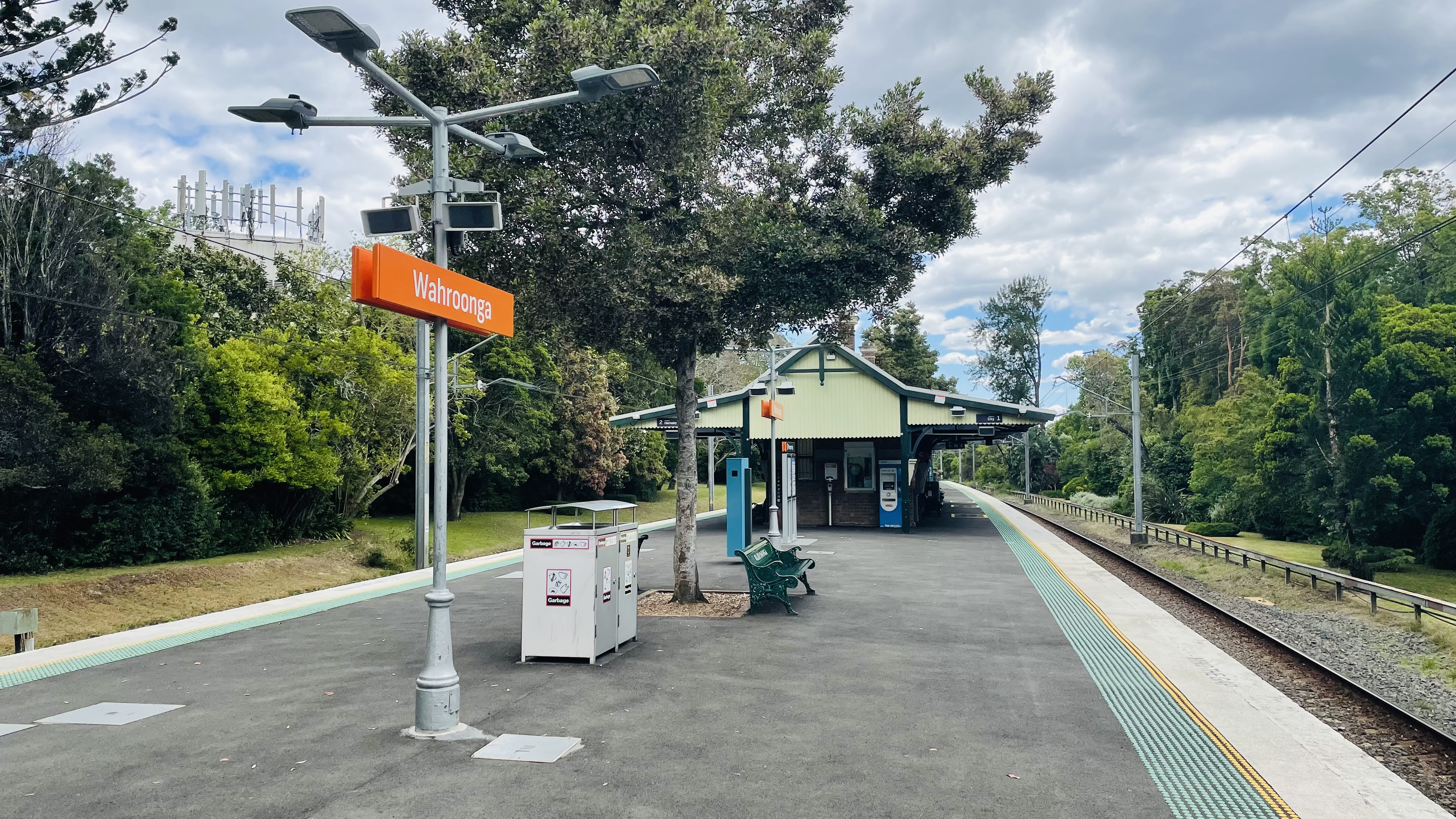
Looking north from the island platform

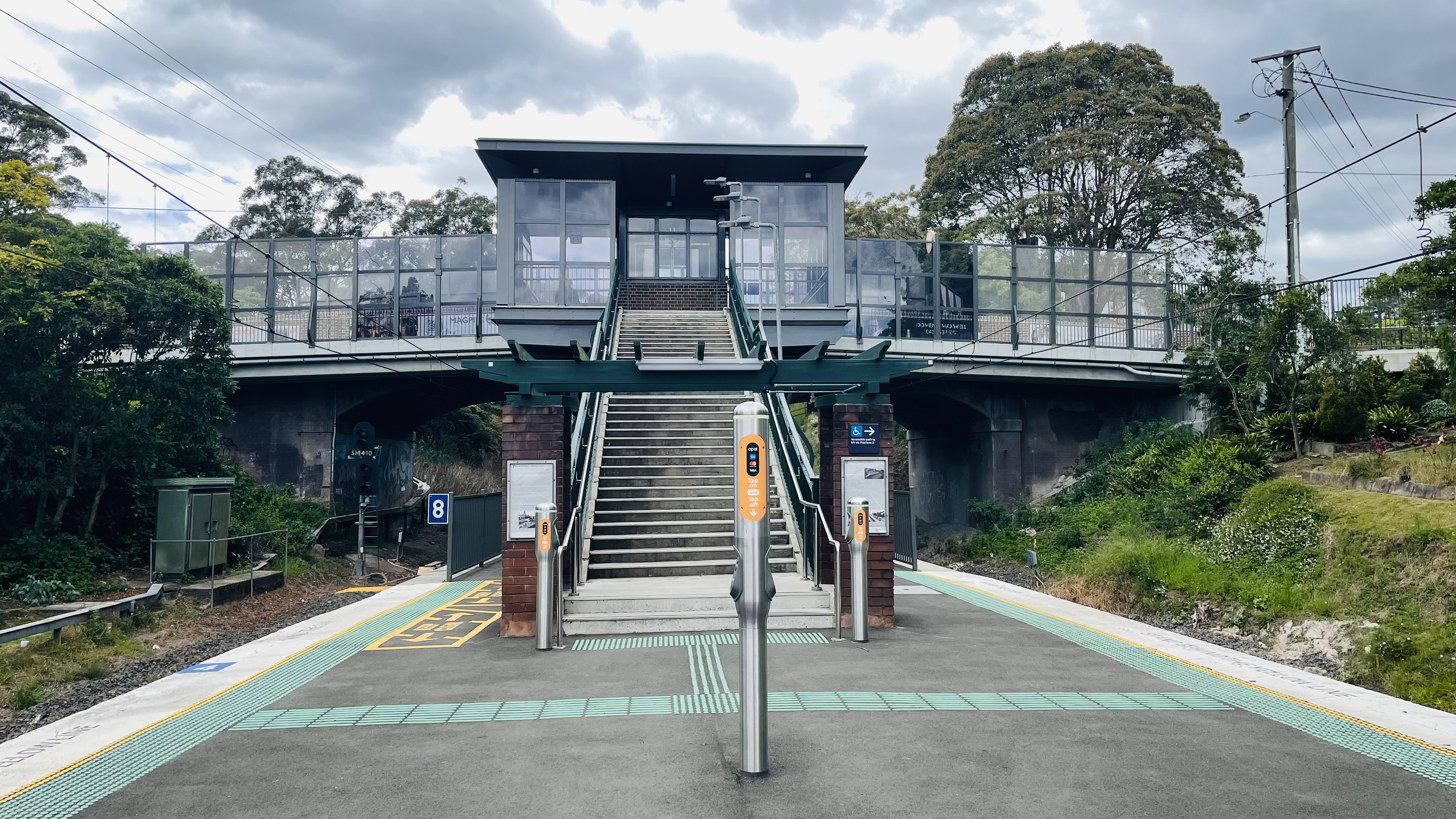
Platform view towards the exit

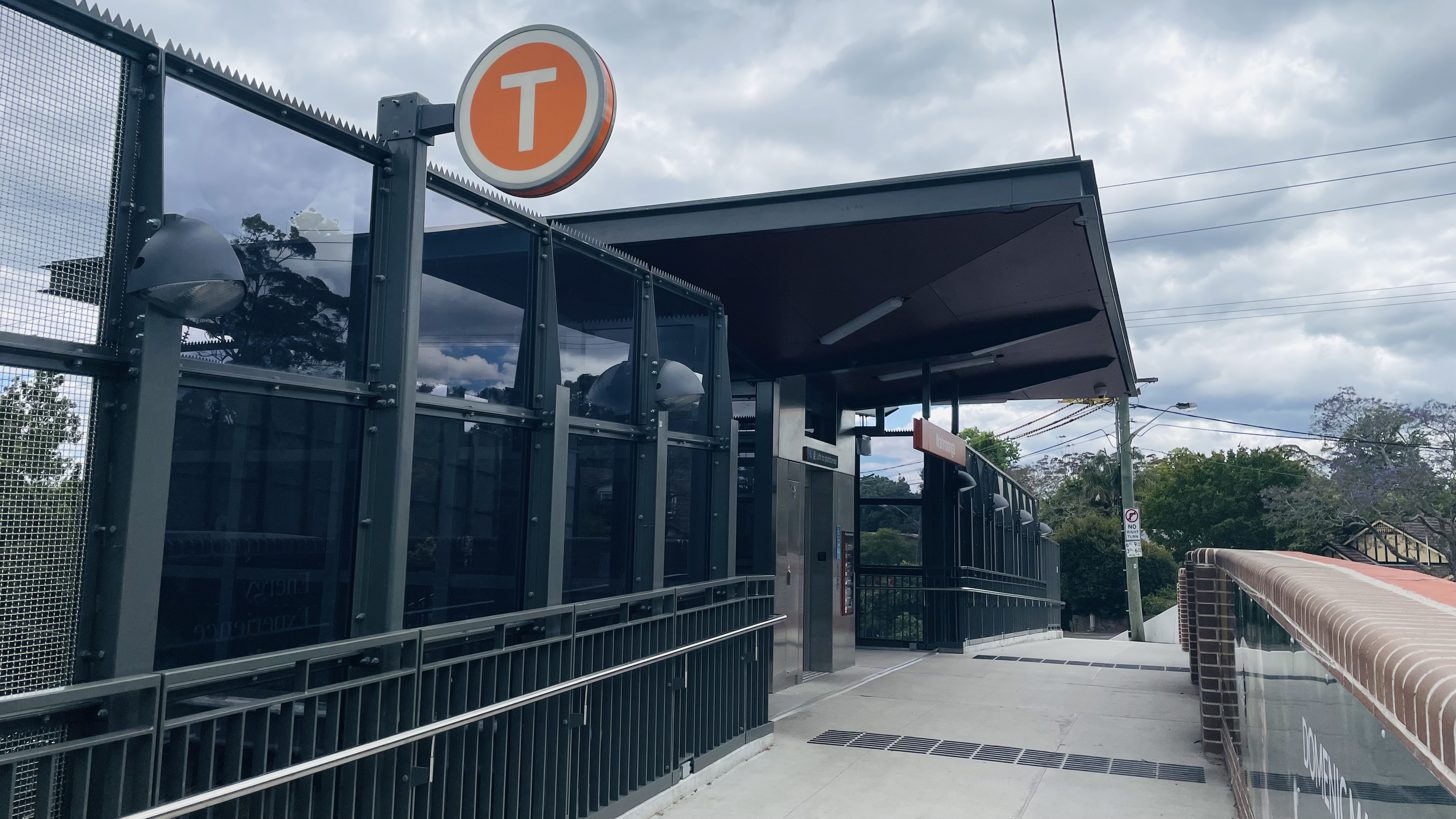
Entrance on Illoura Avenue

== Heritage listing ==
Wahroonga railway station was listed on the New South Wales State Heritage Register on 2 April 1999 having satisfied the following criteria.

The place possesses uncommon, rare or endangered aspects of the cultural or natural history of New South Wales.

This item is assessed as historically rare. This item is assessed as arch. rare. This item is assessed as socially rare.

== See also ==
- List of railway stations in Sydney
