= Waitara railway station =

Railway station in Sydney, New South Wales, Australia

Waitara
- Northbound view from Platform 2 looking at station building, October 2026

General information
- Location: Alexandria Parade, Waitara, New South Wales; Australia
- Coordinates: 33°42′36″S 151°06′16″E
- Elevation: 185 metres (607 ft)
- Owner: New South Wales Government via Transport Asset Manager of New South Wales
- Operator: Sydney Trains
- Line: North Shore
- Distance: 24.21 km (15.04 mi) from Central
- Platforms: 2 (1 island)
- Tracks: 2
- Connections: Bus

Construction
- Structure type: Ground
- Accessible: Yes

Other information
- Status: Weekdays: Staffed 6am to 7pm; Weekends and public holidays: Staffed 8am to 4pm
- Station code: WTA
- Website: Transport for NSW

History
- Opened: 20 April 1895 (131 years ago)
- Rebuilt: 1909
- Electrified: Yes (1927)

Passengers
- 2023: 1,392,600 (year); 3815 (daily) (Sydney Trains, NSW TrainLink)

Services
Preceding station	Sydney Trains	Following station
Wahroonga towards City	North Shore & Western Line	Hornsby towards Berowra
Location

Waitara railway station is a suburban railway station located on the North Shore line, serving the Sydney suburb of Waitara. It is served by Sydney Trains T1 North Shore & Western Line services.

== History ==
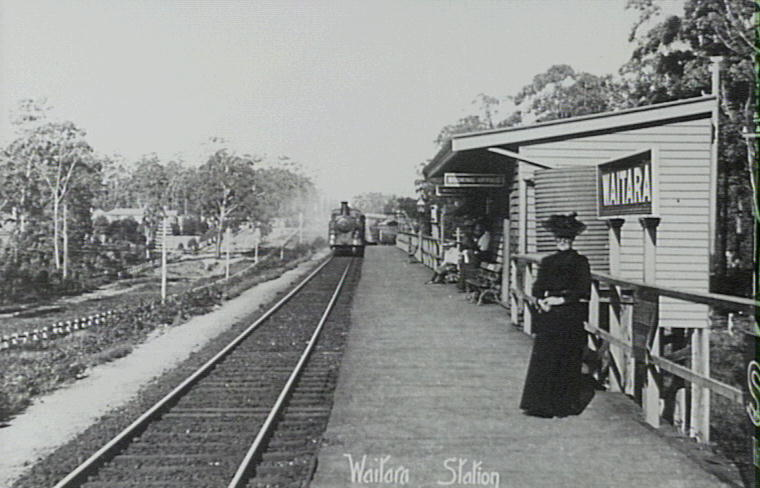
The first station seen in 1907.

Waitara station opened on 20 April 1895. The original station was replaced by the present structure in 1909 when the line was duplicated.

Waitara is one of a very few stations in Australia to have the origins of the name come from a Māori word; it means "pure water". It was suggested to the Railway Commissioner by Myles McRae, who had owned land at Hurstville called "Waitara," which he had purchased from G. B. Walker, a manager of a land company.

The station completed an upgrade in February 2024 where a new underpass was constructed at the northern end of the station which was complete with accessible access from both Alexandria Parade and the commuter carpark on Waitara Avenue, this was along with two new lifts built to provide that accessible access, an extended canopy to the new northern entrance to the platform, and a new small bike rack.

North-east entrance to the underpass constructed in 2024

View from the north-east entrance into the underpass constructed in 2024

South-west entrance with lift to the underpass constructed in 2024

== Services ==
=== Platforms ===
Platform	Line	Stopping pattern	Notes
1	North Shore & Western Line	services to Epping & Hornsby via Strathfield, Richmond, Penrith & Emu Plains	
2	North Shore & Western Line	services to Hornsby & Berowra	

=== Transport links ===
CDC NSW operates two bus route via Waitara station, under contract to Transport for NSW:

Pacific Hwy:

- 589: Hornsby station to Sydney Adventist Hospital
- 600: Hornsby station to Parramatta

Waitara station is served by one NightRide route:

- N90: Hornsby station to Town Hall station

== Gallery ==
Southbound view from the island platform after the 2024 upgrades

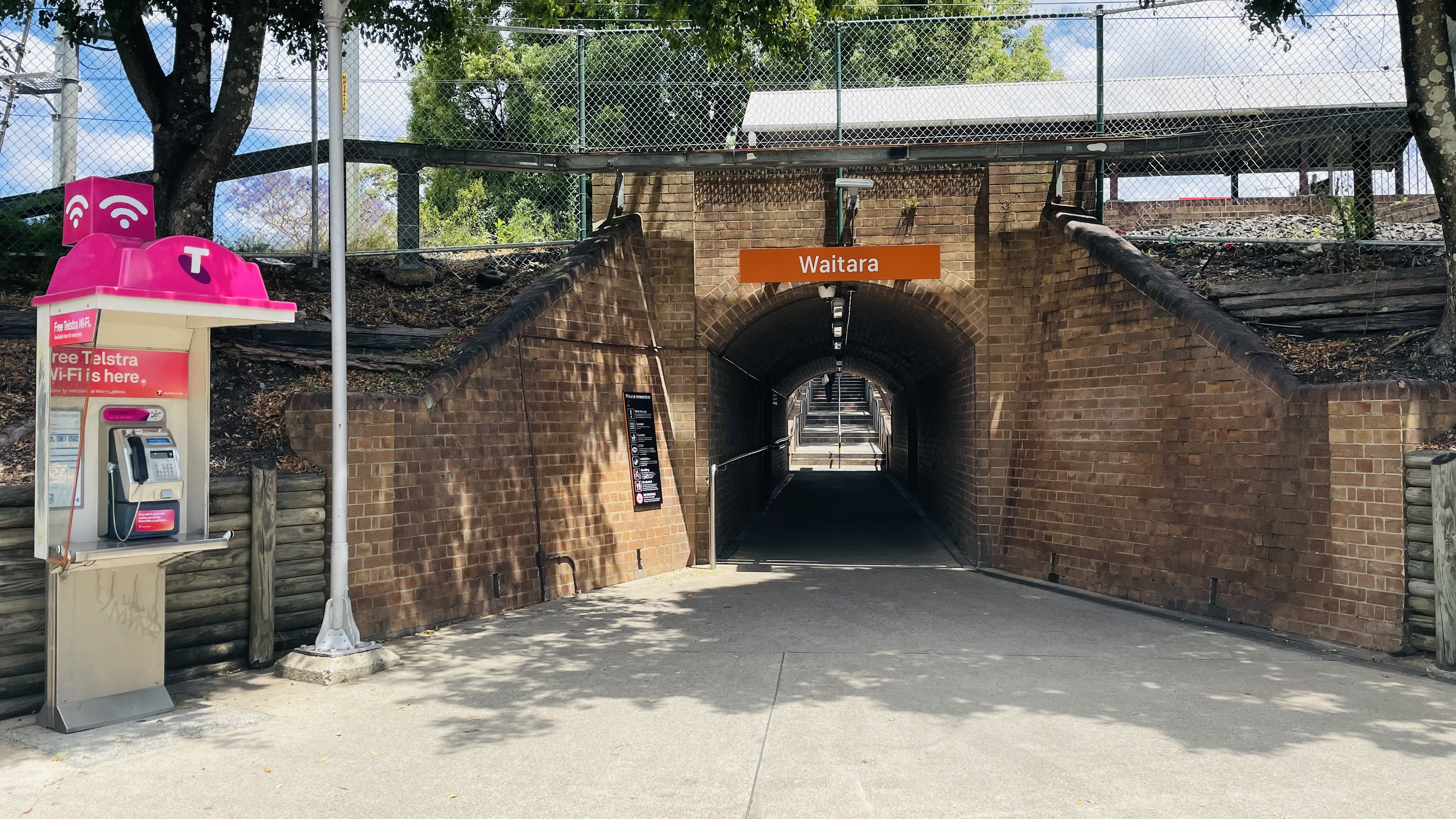
Southern underpass

Station seen from carpark
