= Deborah Schofield =

Australian economist

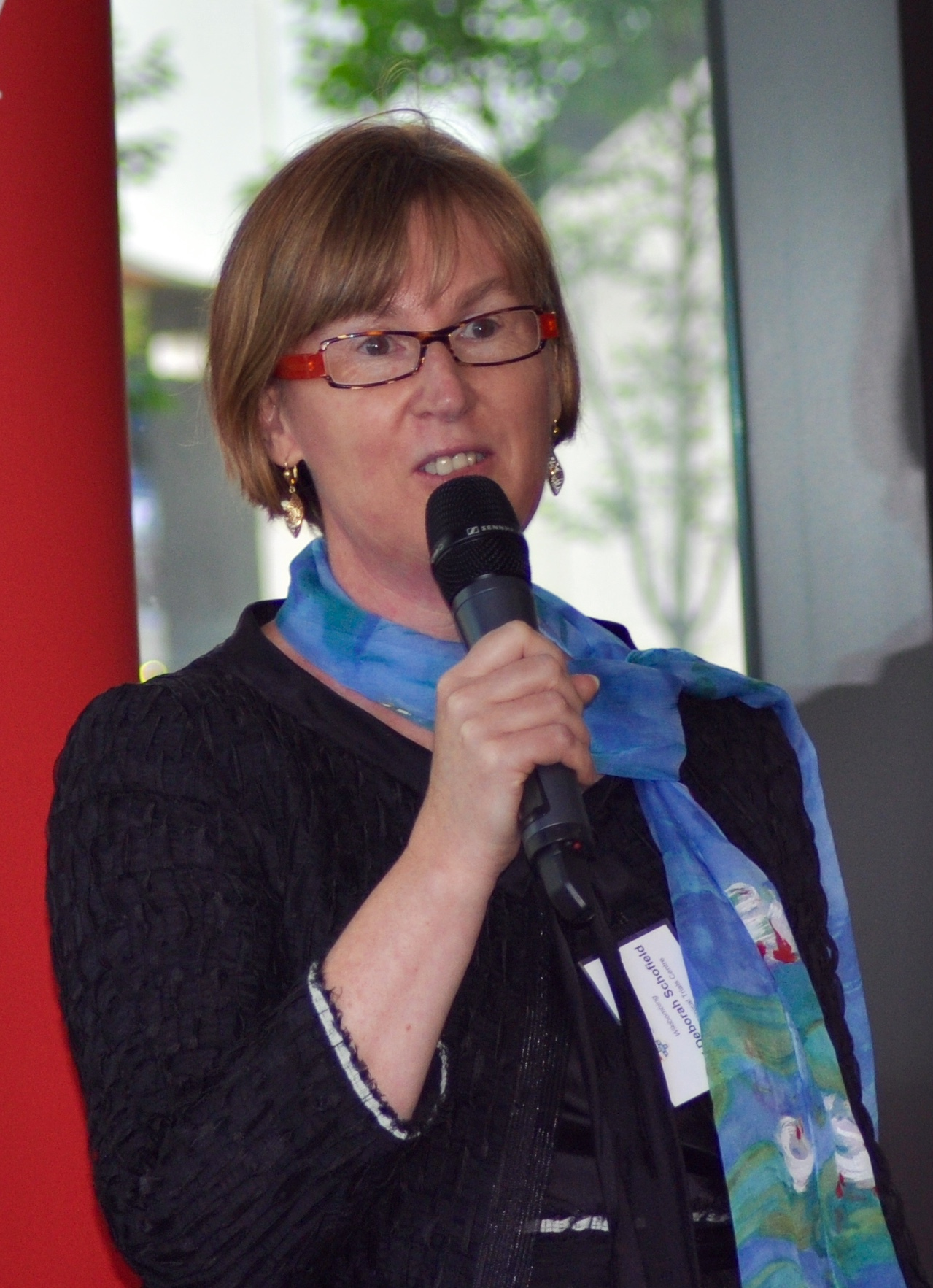
Deborah Schofield in 2014

Deborah Schofield is an Australian academic in the Macquarie Business School, Macquarie University where she is the director of the Centre for Economic Impacts of Genomic Medicine (GenIMPACT)

== Background ==
Schofield was born in 1965 in Wahroonga, Sydney. She has worked for the Australian Government, in academia and clinical practice and studied health microsimulation modelling at National Centre for Social and Economic Modelling.

Prior to joining Macquarie University and the University of Sydney, Schofield worked for a decade in senior governmental roles where she led the development of major new policies.

== Education ==
Schofield began her career with a Bachelor of Speech Therapy from the University of Queensland in 1986, which she followed up with Graduate Diploma in Computing Science from the University of Canberra in 1993. She received a PhD in applied microsimulation modelling in 1999, also from the University of Canberra.

== Research ==
Schofield's research includes assessments of the productivity impacts of illness. She currently leads a research program at Macquarie University on the relationship between health and social policy. The applications of microsimulation Schofield and colleagues pioneered helps to ensure health care funding is sustainable and labour force participation is maximised. This assists governments providing the information needed by policymakers who impact health, the labour market, income and taxation policy.

The purpose of Schofield's research is to ensure that the health and aged care systems meet the demands of an ageing population. It uses data drawn from her own work, other studies and publicly available datasets in areas as diverse as IQ deficits caused by anaemia in pregnancy, poverty and mental illness, genetic testing for highly disabling childhood genetic disorders, chronic pain and whole genome sequencing.
