= Wahroonga =

- Suburb
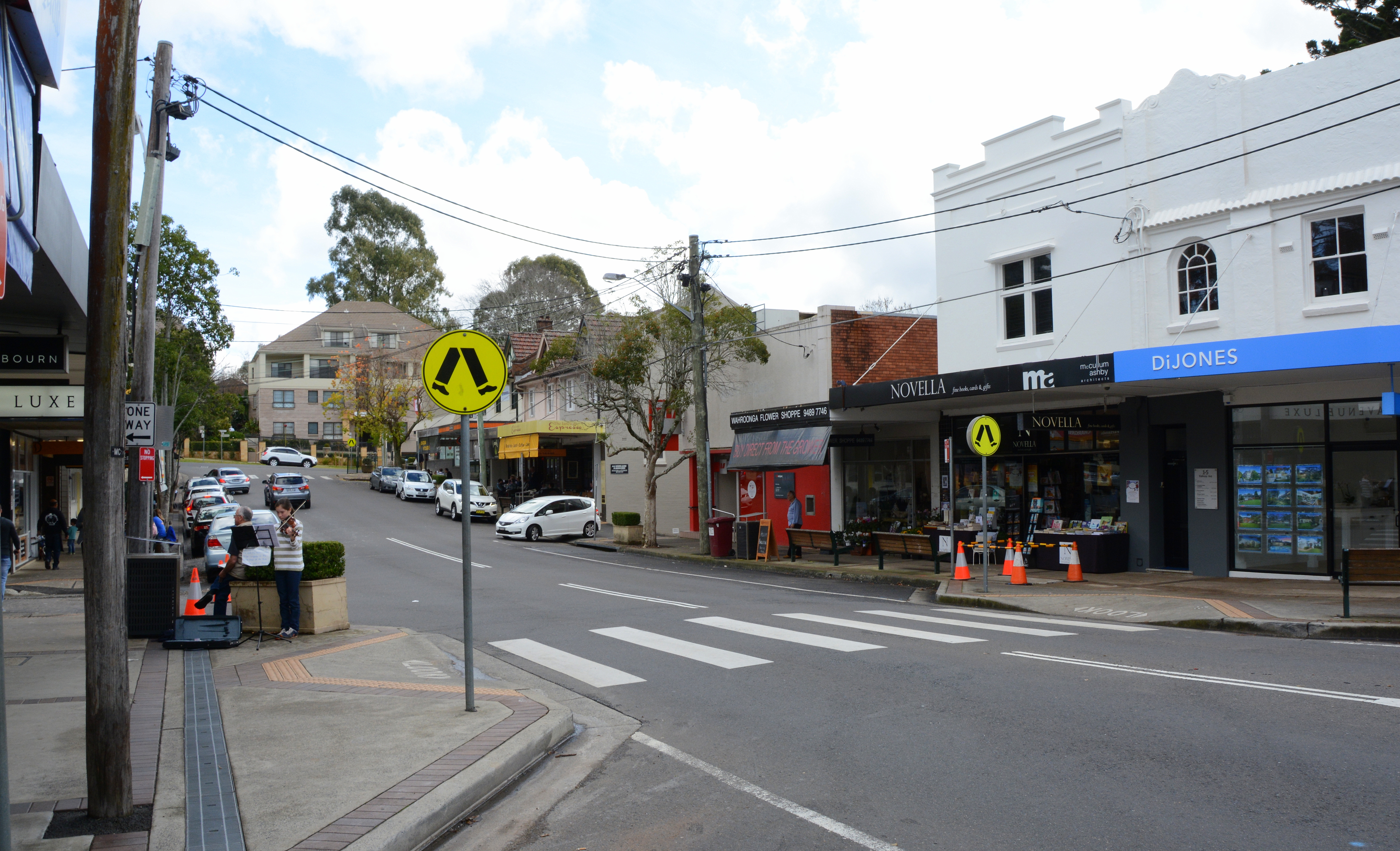
- Railway Avenue

- Interactive map of Wahroonga
- Country: Australia
- State: New South Wales
- City: Sydney
- LGA: Ku-ring-gai Council Hornsby Shire
- Location: 18 km (11 mi) north-west of Sydney CBD
- Established: 1822

Government
  - State electorate: Wahroonga
  - Federal division: Bradfield (Ku-ring-gai) (Note: Ku-ring-gai streets of Mount Pleasant Avenue and Waratah Way are in the Federal Division of Berowra.) Berowra (Hornsby)

Area
  - Total: 8.09 km^{2} (3.12 sq mi)
- Elevation: 202 m (663 ft)

Population
  - Total: 13,104 (ERP (Note: Meaning "Estimated Resident Population".) 2023)
  - Density: 1,620/km^{2} (4,200/sq mi)
- Postcode: 2076
Suburbs around Wahroonga
Hornsby; Waitara	North Wahroonga	North Turramurra
Normanhurst; Thornleigh	Wahroonga	Turramurra
Pennant Hills	Warrawee	South Turramurra

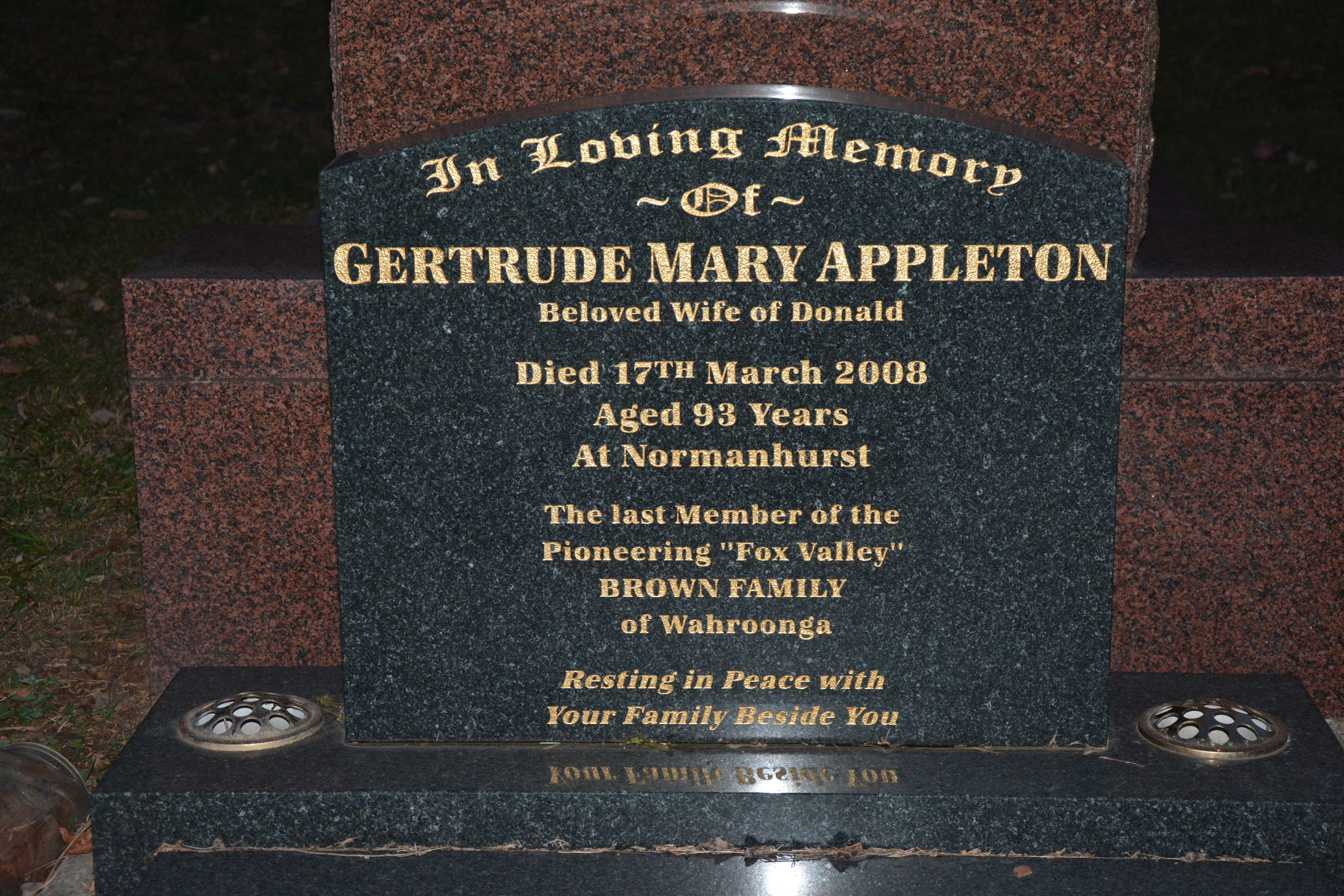
Grave of Gertrude Mary Appleton, last member of the Brown family, who played a large part in developing Wahroonga

Wahroonga is a suburb on the Upper North Shore of Sydney, in the state of New South Wales, Australia, 18 kilometres north-west of the Sydney central business district, in the local government areas of Ku-ring-gai Council and Hornsby Shire. North Wahroonga is an adjacent separate suburb of the same postcode.

== History ==
Wahroonga is an Aboriginal word meaning our home, likely originating from the Kuringgai language group. Early British colonists of New South Wales utilized the area for its tall trees. Wahroonga was first colonised by the British in 1822 by Thomas Hyndes, a convict who later became a wealthy landowner.

Hyndes's land was later acquired by John Brown, a merchant and timber-getter. After Brown had cleared the land of timber, he planted orchards. Later, Ada, Lucinda and Roland Avenues were named after three of his children. His name is in Browns Road, Browns Field and Browns Waterhole on the Lane Cove River. The last member of the Brown family was Gertrude Mary Appleton, who died in 2008 at the age of ninety-three. She is buried in the cemetery of St John the Baptist Church, Gordon.

After the North Shore railway line was opened in 1890 it became a popular place for wealthy businessmen to build out-of-town residences with large gardens. Wahroonga Post Office opened on 15 October 1896. Much of this development occurred in the 1920s and 1930s.

The Sydney Adventist Hospital was opened in Wahroonga by the Seventh-day Adventist Church on 1 January 1903.

Wahroonga Great War Memorial was unveiled on 28 February 1925 by Australian prime minister Stanley Bruce. The stone pillar honours local member services, in remembrance to those who lost their lives as soldiers during World War I.

=== Heritage listings ===
The following properties in Wahroonga are listed on the New South Wales State Heritage Register:

- The Briars, 14 Woonona Avenue
- Evatt House, 69 Junction Road
- Highlands, 9 Highlands Avenue
- Jack House, 62 Boundary Road
- Mahratta, 1526 Pacific Highway
- Purulia, 16 Fox Valley Road
- Rose Seidler House, 69–71 Clissold Road
- St John's Uniting Church, 61–65 Coonanbarra Road
- Simpson-Lee House I, 23 Roland Avenue
- Wahroonga railway station, North Shore railway, Pacific Highway
- Wahroonga Reservoir, 1678 Pacific Highway and Woonona Avenue

=== Other notable buildings ===
Berith Park, in Billyard Avenue, was designed by F. Ernest Stowe for Alfred Smith, who bought the land in 1897. The house was finished c. 1909.

Howard Joseland designed several houses in the Arts and Crafts style in Wahroonga including, in Water Street, Westholme in 1894 for John Bennett, one of the pioneer developers of the suburb. Bennett migrated from England with his wife and acquired property in 1893. Another house was added at the other end of the block, and this was demolished in 1991 after changing hands several times. Joseland also designed The Gatehouse, also in Water Street, originally part of the John Williams Hospital that includes the Federation mansion Rippon Grange, designed by Joseland. Joseland also designed Craignairn in the Arts and Crafts style, at the corner of Burns Road and Cleveland Street, for Walter Strang; and Joseland built his own home, Malvern, two doors away in Burns Road, in the Federation Bungalow style, described as "unpretentious and solidly comfortable." Also on Burns Road, Joseland designed Coolabah, another Federation Bungalow house.

Wahroonga is known for its tree-lined, shady streets, and well maintained gardens; including Water Street, Burns Road, Iloura Avenue, and Billyard Avenue.

== Commercial areas ==
The main shopping and commercial area is the Wahroonga Village located adjacent to the west side of the railway station. It has a variety of stores including several cafes, restaurants, health stores and boutiques as well as an IGA supermarket.

The smaller commercial centres are the Hampden Avenue shopping strip in east Wahroonga, and Fox Valley Shopping Centre on Fox Valley Road in south west Wahroonga.

=== Fox Valley Road/Comenarra Parkway ===
There is also a commercial area at the intersection of Fox Valley Road and The Comenarra Parkway which contains the Sydney Adventist Hospital, Globalstar's Australian office, and the offices of the South Pacific Division of Seventh-day Adventists.

== Sports ==
The Wahroonga Rugby Club, nicknamed the "Tigers" is the local rugby union team and the suburbs leading local sports team. The team plays home games at Cliff Oval in North Wahroonga. The team is affiliated with the Gordon Rugby Club, as Wahroonga falls within Gordon's catchment area. Knox Grammar School which is located in Wahroonga like other boys private schools considered exclusive in Sydney is a traditional rugby union school. Wahroonga doesn’t have a cricket club playing in the suburb, but is represented by name by the St Ives-Wahroonga cricket club who play in nearby St Ives. Other nearby cricket clubs include the Kissing Point Cricket Club, in nearby South Turramurra, the local team south of pacific highway. the Normanhurst Warrawee Cricket Club in nearby Normanhurst who shares the 2076 postcode with Wahroonga, the Thornleigh Cricket Club, and the Pennant Hills Cricket Club. In rugby league, Wahroonga falls within the catchment area of the North Sydney Bears, officially the North Sydney District Rugby League Football Club, the only team in the Sydney Metropolitan Area without Rugby League representation to have a junior catchment area. The Ku-ring-gai Cubs and Asquith Magpies are the local teams. The Ku-ring-gai Cubs who play at Memorial Park in Turramurra represent the Ku-ring-gai parts of the suburb, whilst the Asquith Magpies are the local team for the Hornsby Shire parts of the suburb, as their licensed club is Magpies in nearby Waitara.

== Transport ==
Wahroonga railway station is on the North Shore railway line, with frequent Sydney Trains services to Central and Hornsby.

Wahroonga is the Sydney end of the M1 Motorway to Newcastle. The Pacific Highway connects Wahroonga by road with the rest of the North Shore and Pennant Hills Road's northern end begins in Wahroonga and intersects the M1 Motorway at Pearce's Corner. The Comenarra Parkway is a minor arterial road that stretches from Thornleigh to West Pymble via Wahroonga and South Turramurra. Wahroonga is also the northern end of the NorthConnex motorway tunnel.

CDC NSW provides bus services to parts of Wahroonga such as the 576 to Wahroonga Station, 576T to Turramurra Station, 575 to Macquarie University or Hornsby Station via Turramurra, and the 591 to St Ives Community Centre or Hornsby Station.

== Parks ==
Wahroonga Park is located to the north of the railway station, and features a significant number of well established introduced trees, a rose garden and a children's playground. The Glade, located near Abbotsleigh, has an oval, two tennis courts, a half basketball court and cricket nets. There is also a small Blue Gum High Forest, next to the tennis courts. Browns Field is a small sporting oval, formerly a historic logging area. Sir Robert Menzies Park is a small park located within Fox Valley.

Ku-ring-gai Chase National Park is located north of Wahroonga. It is the second oldest national park in Australia and is very popular, offering many walking tracks, picnic spots and Aboriginal sites with rock carvings. The park has a large proportion of the known Aboriginal sites in the Sydney area.

== Schools ==
Primary:

- Wahroonga Public School
- Waitara Public School
- Prouille Catholic Primary School
- Wahroonga Preparatory School

Secondary:

- St Leo's Catholic College
- St Edmund's School for students with vision impairment and other special needs

K–12:

- Knox Grammar School
- Abbotsleigh School for Girls
- Wahroonga Adventist School
- St Lucy's School for children with disabilities

== Gallery ==
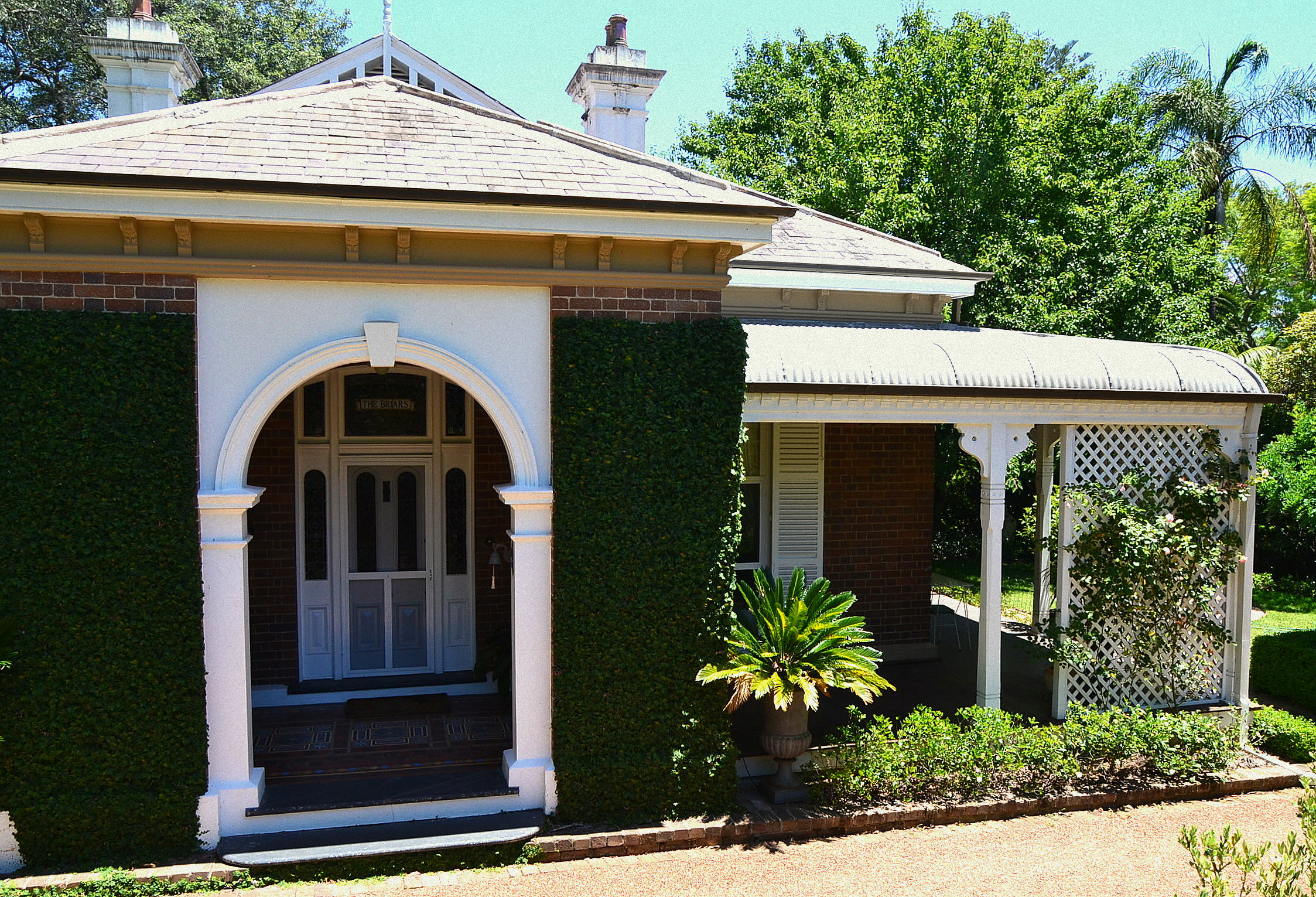
The Briars

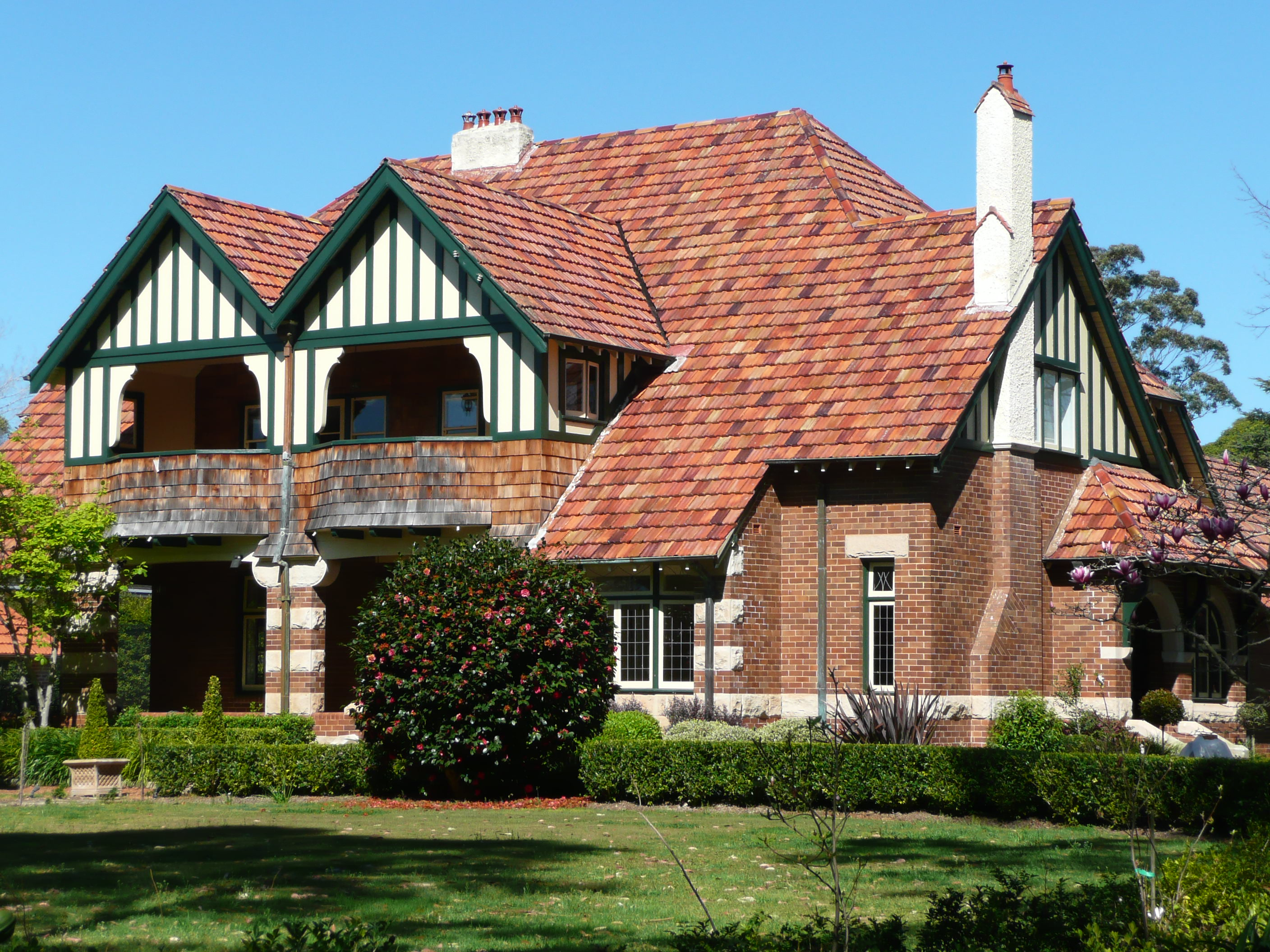
Craignairn heritage-listed home, Burns Road

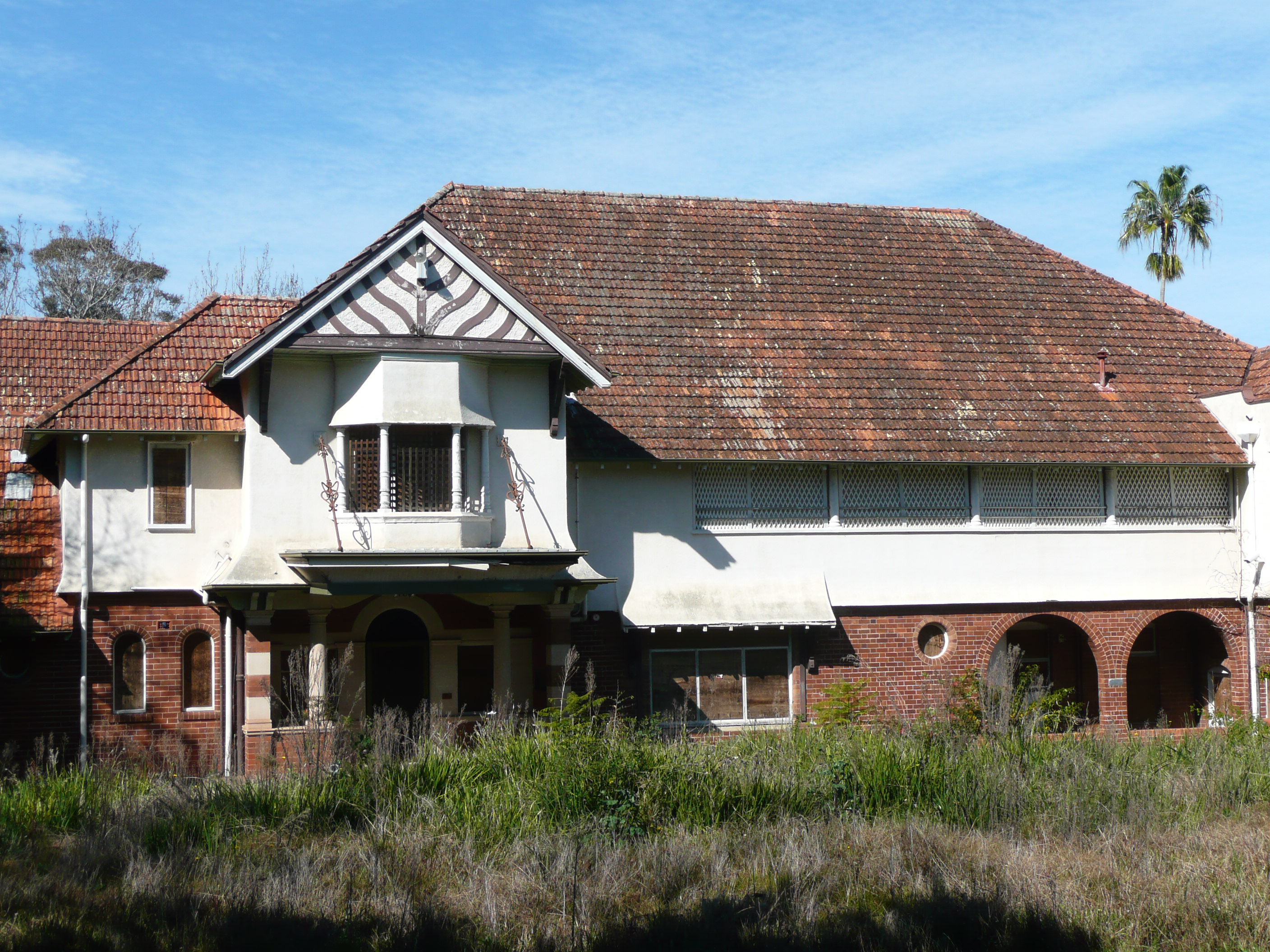
Rippon Grange, heritage-listed mansion, Water Street

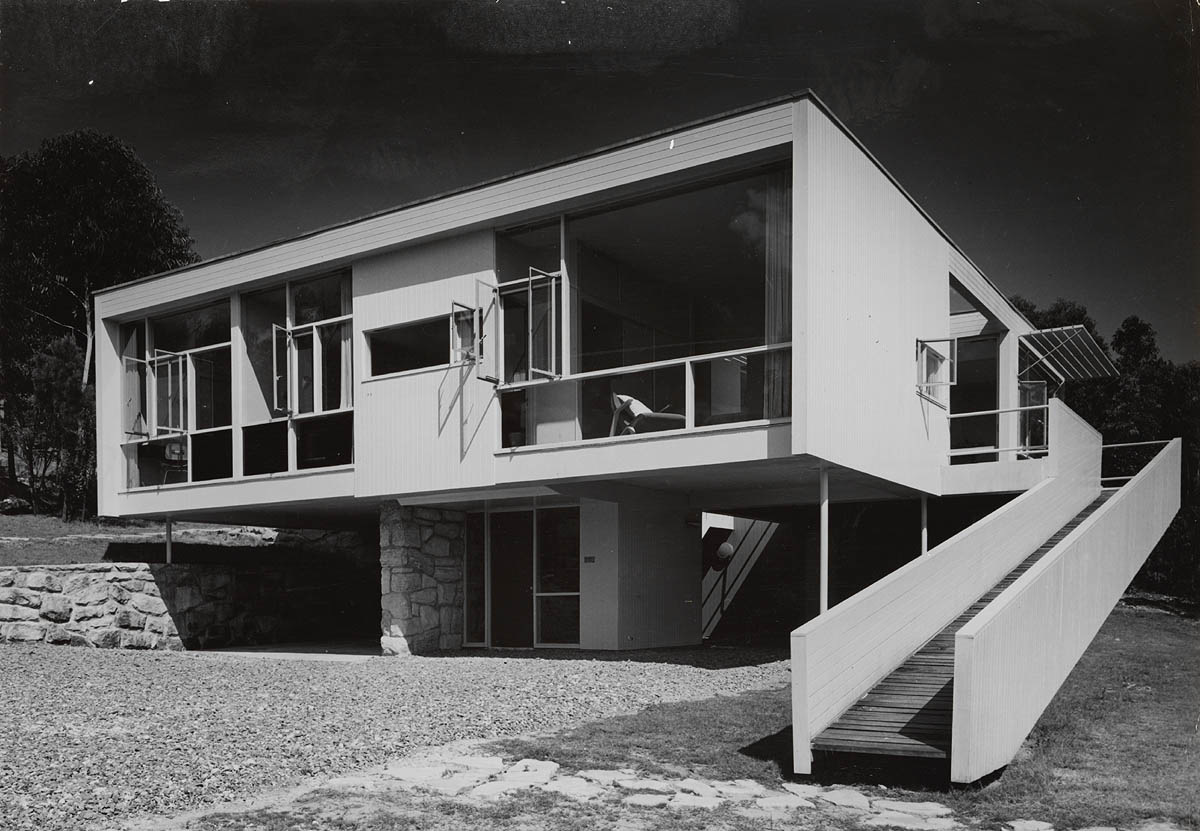
Rose Seidler House, Clissold Road

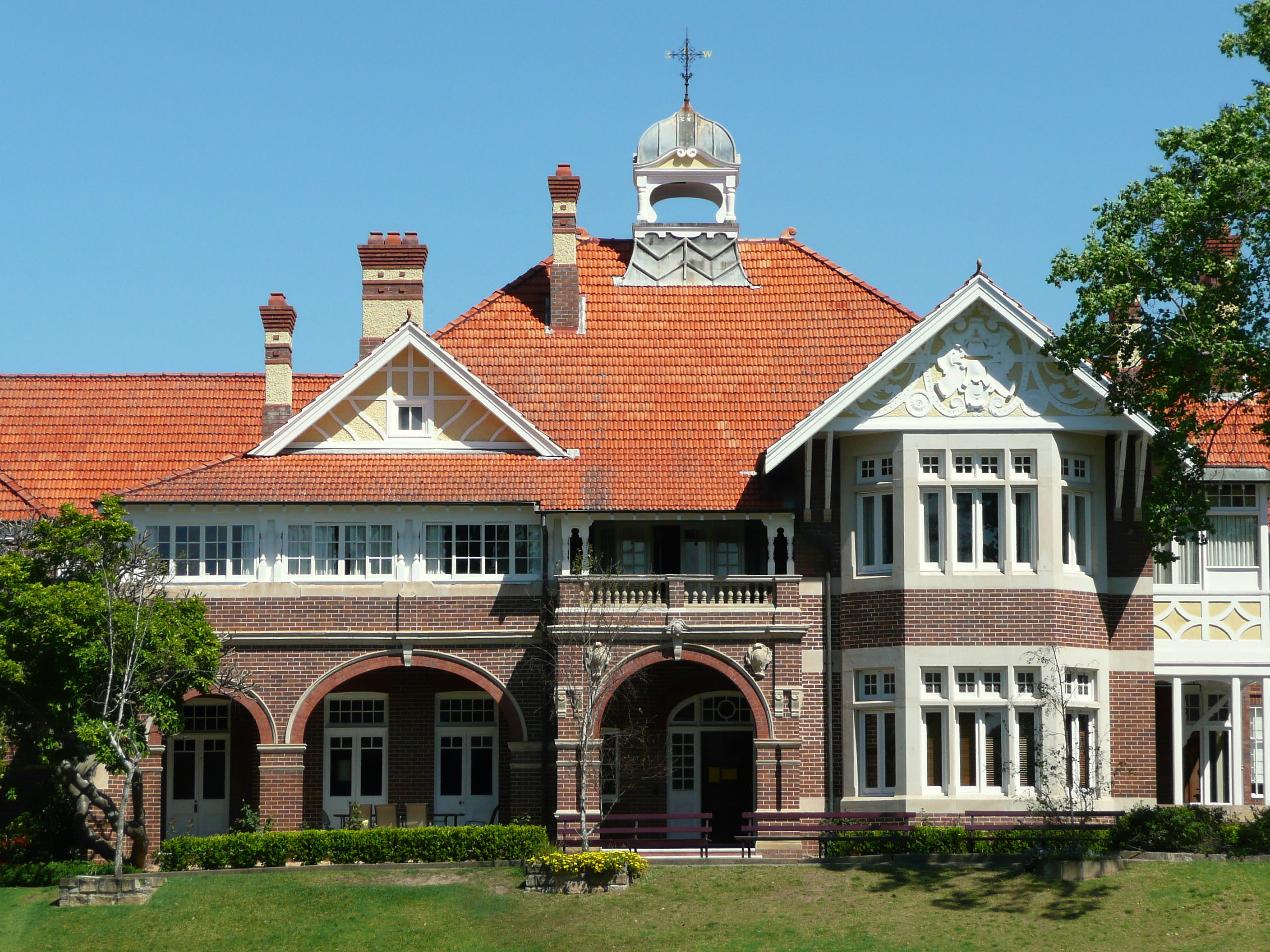
Knox Grammar Preparatory School

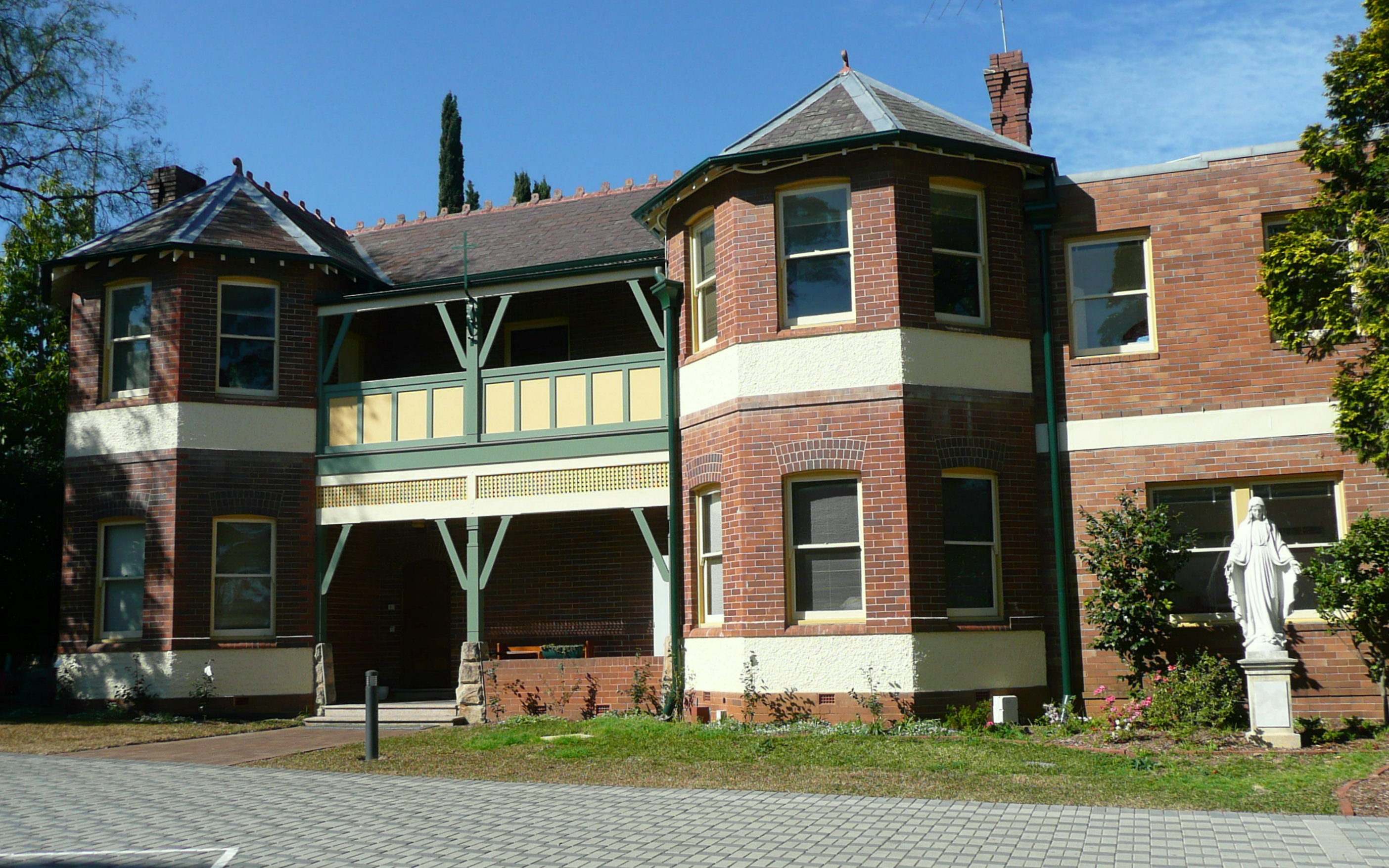
St Lucy's School

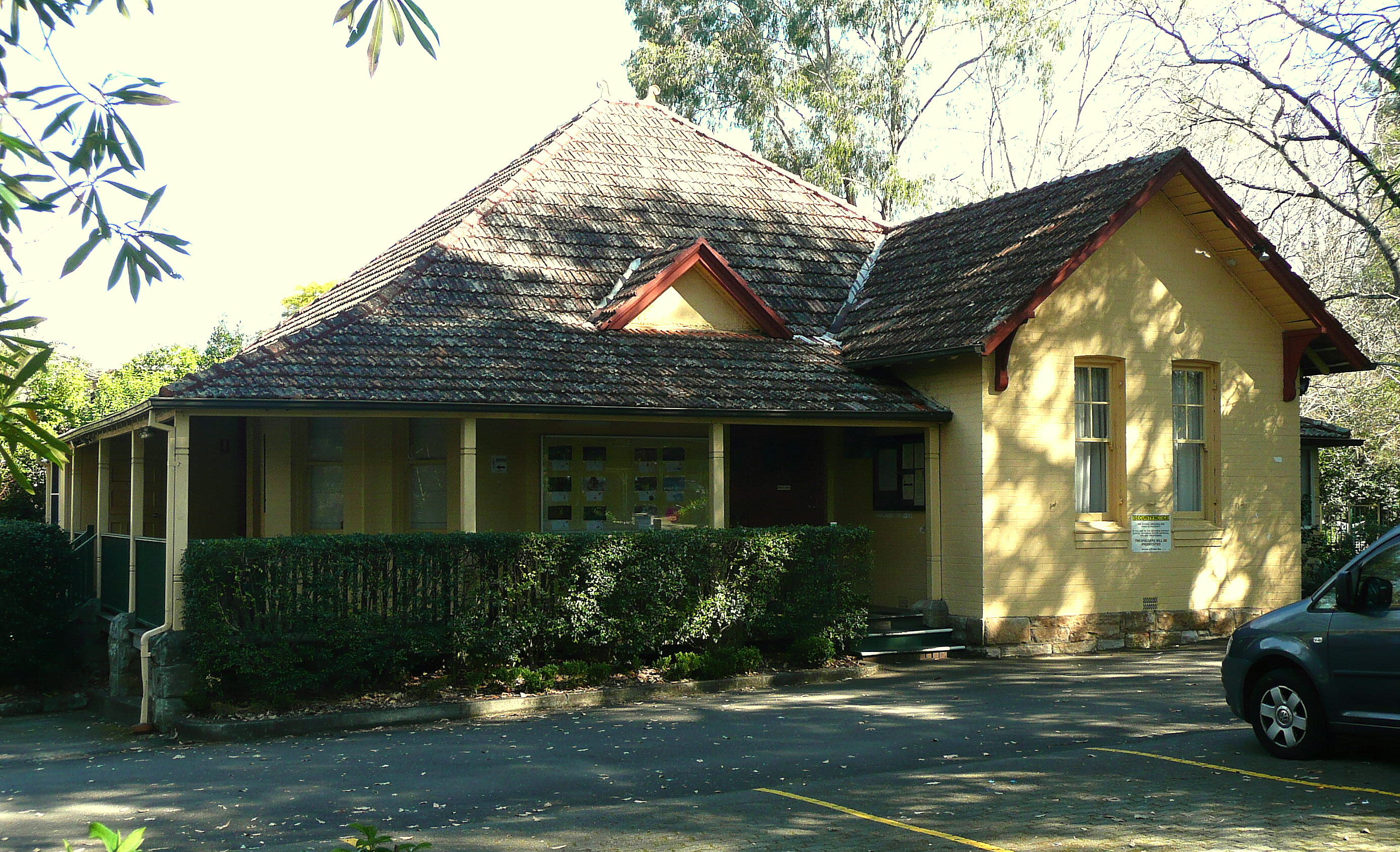
Prouille School

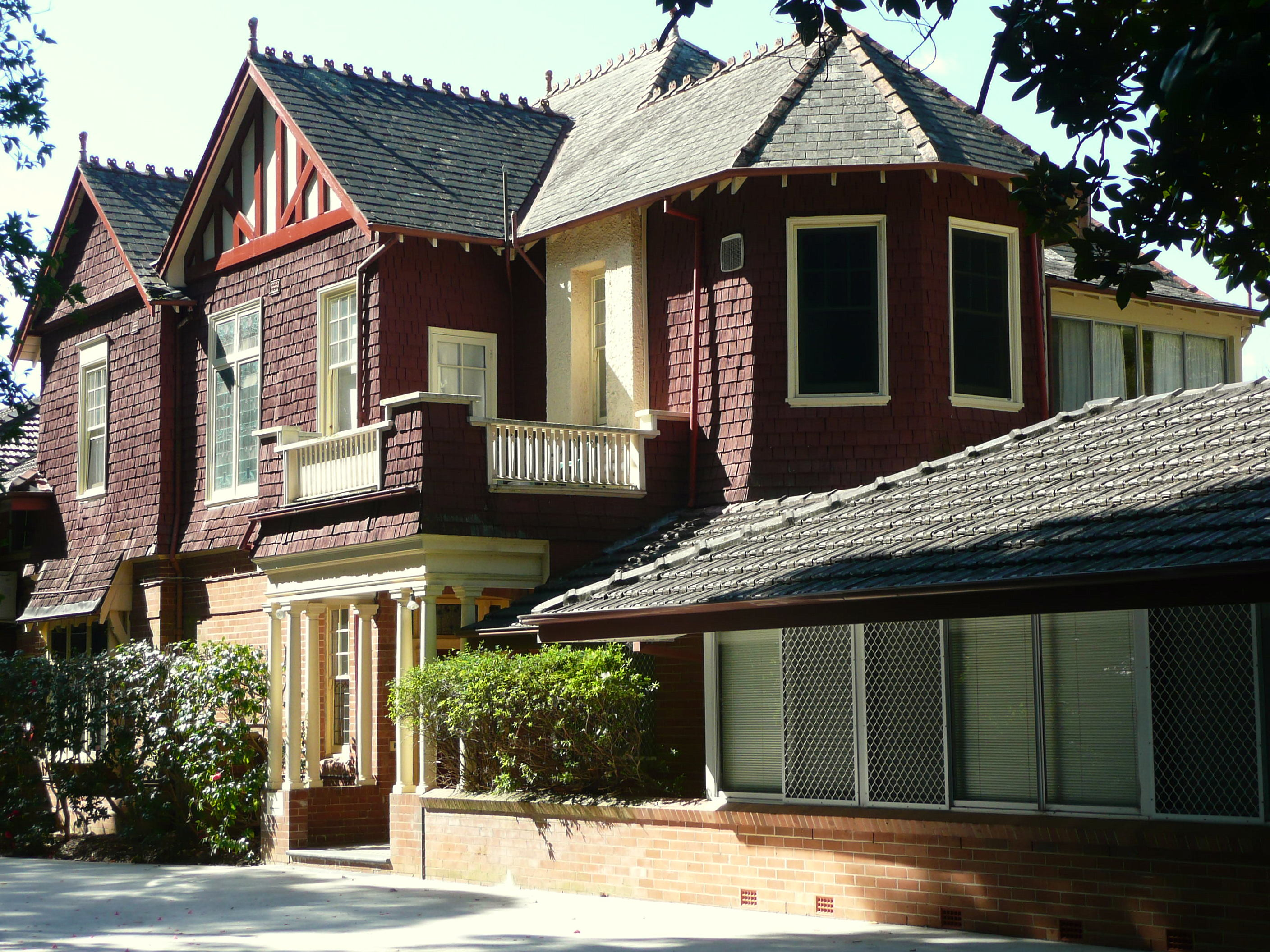
St Edmund's School

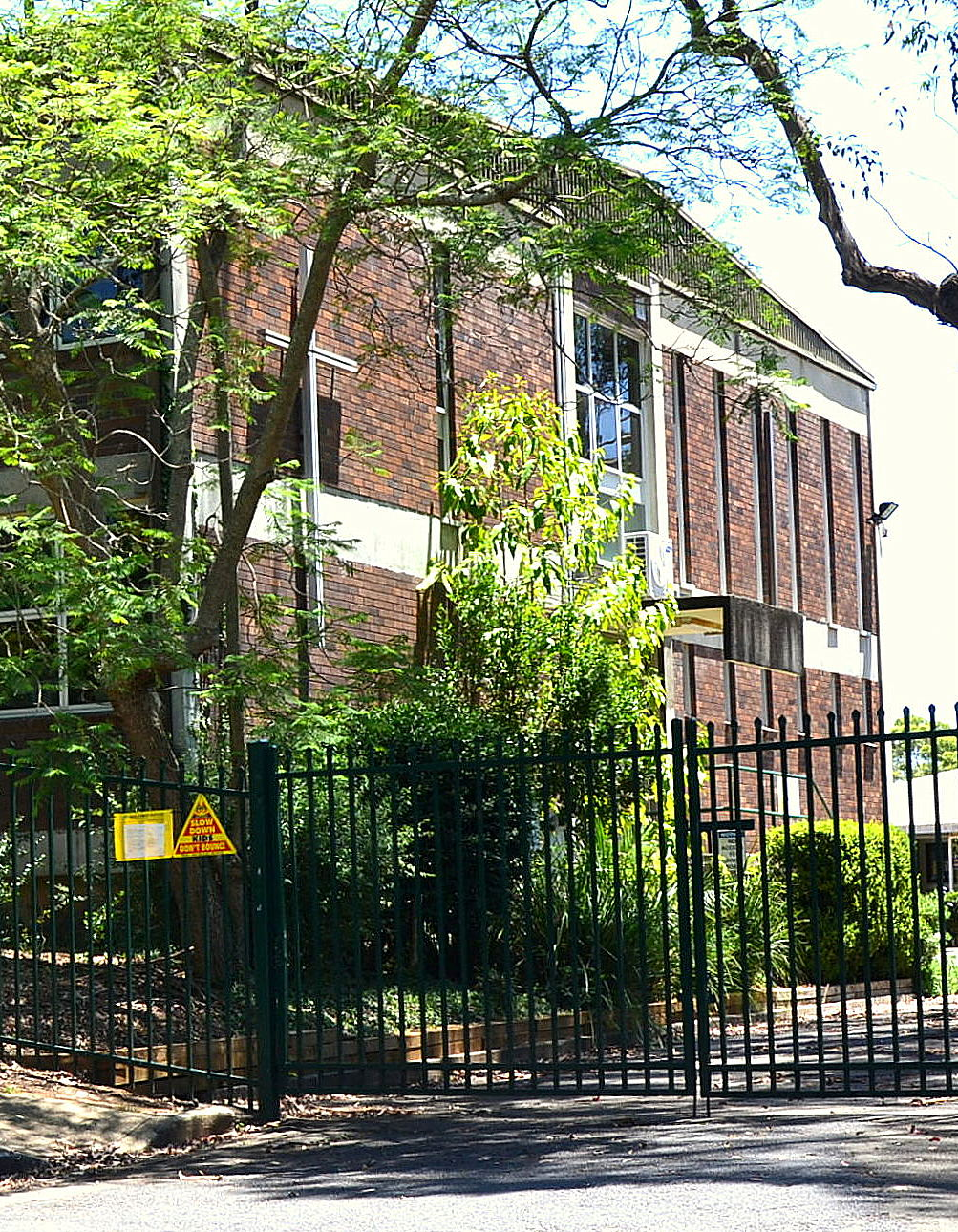
St Leo's Catholic College

== Population ==
=== Demographics ===
According to the 2021 census, there were 17,853 residents in Wahroonga. 59.3% of people were born in Australia, the most common other countries of birth were China (excluding Special Administrative Regions and Taiwan) 8.2%, England 4.9%, India 2.9%, South Africa 2.6% and Hong Kong 1.9%. 67.9% of people only spoke English at home, other languages spoken at home included Mandarin (10.2%), Cantonese (3.5%), Korean (1.8%), Hindi (1.4%) and Persian (1.3%). The most common responses for religion in Wahroonga were No Religion 35.5%, Catholic 19.5%, Anglican 16.4% and Uniting Church 3.7%; a further 4.5% of respondents elected not to disclose their religion.

=== Notable residents ===
- Halse Rogers Arnott, medical practitioner, company director and former chairman of Arnott's, lived on Burns Road
- Kevin Best, artist
- Dorothy ('Dot') Butler, bushwalker, mountaineer, and conservationist, lived on Boundary Road
- David Campese, former Wallaby
- Mike Carlton, journalist and radio host
- Grace Cossington Smith, Australian artist and pioneer of modernist painting, attended Abbotsleigh School
- Clive Evatt, politician and barrister
- Nicholas Fitzgerald, football (soccer) player for the Brisbane Roar
- Martin Flood, Australian quiz champion
- Adam Garcia, actor
- Peter Garrett, frontman of 1980s band Midnight Oil and former member of the Australian House of Representatives for Kingsford Smith from 2004 to 2013 was born and raised here.
- Mel Gibson, actor, was educated by members of the Congregation of Christian Brothers at St Leo's Catholic College during his high school years
- Stuart Inder, journalist, editor and specialist in Pacific Islands affairs
- Hugh Jackman, actor
- Howard Joseland, architect, responsible for many of Wahroonga's early homes
- Ian Jackman, judge
- Matt Kean, Member of the New South Wales Legislative Assembly representing the neighbouring district of Hornsby.
- Sir Lionel Lindsay, artist, lived in Burns Road.
- John Lynch, historical linguist of the Oceanic languages
- Richard Makinson, physicist
- Ollie McGill, keyboardist and backing vocalist for The Cat Empire
- Ellyse Perry, Australian dual-international footballer and cricketer
- Jacob Preston, rugby league player
- Deborah Schofield, director of the Centre for Economic Impacts of Genomic Medicine at Macquarie University
- Natalie Tobin, association football player for Sydney FC
- John Toohey, founder of Tooheys Brewery and politician, lived at Innisfail, now part of Knox Grammar School
- William Hardy Wilson, architect, artist and author
- William Windeyer, justice of the Supreme Court of New South Wales and decorated soldier
- Harry Wolstenholme, lawyer and amateur ornithologist lived in Wahroonga
