= Waitara, New South Wales =

Waitara
- Suburb
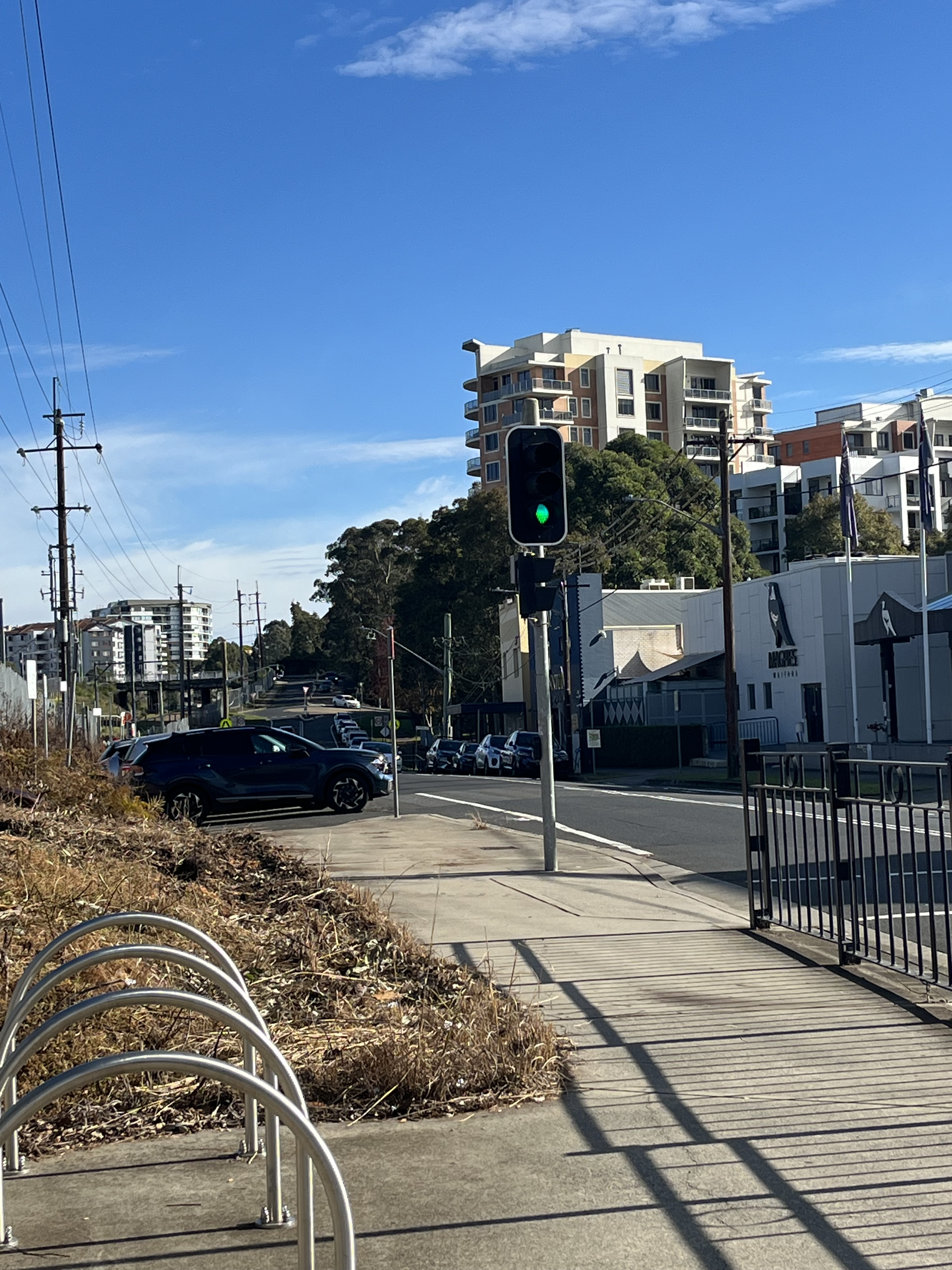
- Alexandria Parade

- Interactive map of Waitara
- Country: Australia
- State: New South Wales
- City: Sydney
- LGA: Hornsby Shire
- Location: 18 km (11 mi) north-west of Sydney CBD

Government
  - State electorate: Wahroonga
  - Federal division: Berowra
- Elevation: 187 m (614 ft)

Population
  - Total: 7,837 (2021 census)
- Postcode: 2077
Suburbs around Waitara
Hornsby	Hornsby	Asquith
Hornsby	Waitara	North Wahroonga
Normanhurst	Wahroonga	Wahroonga

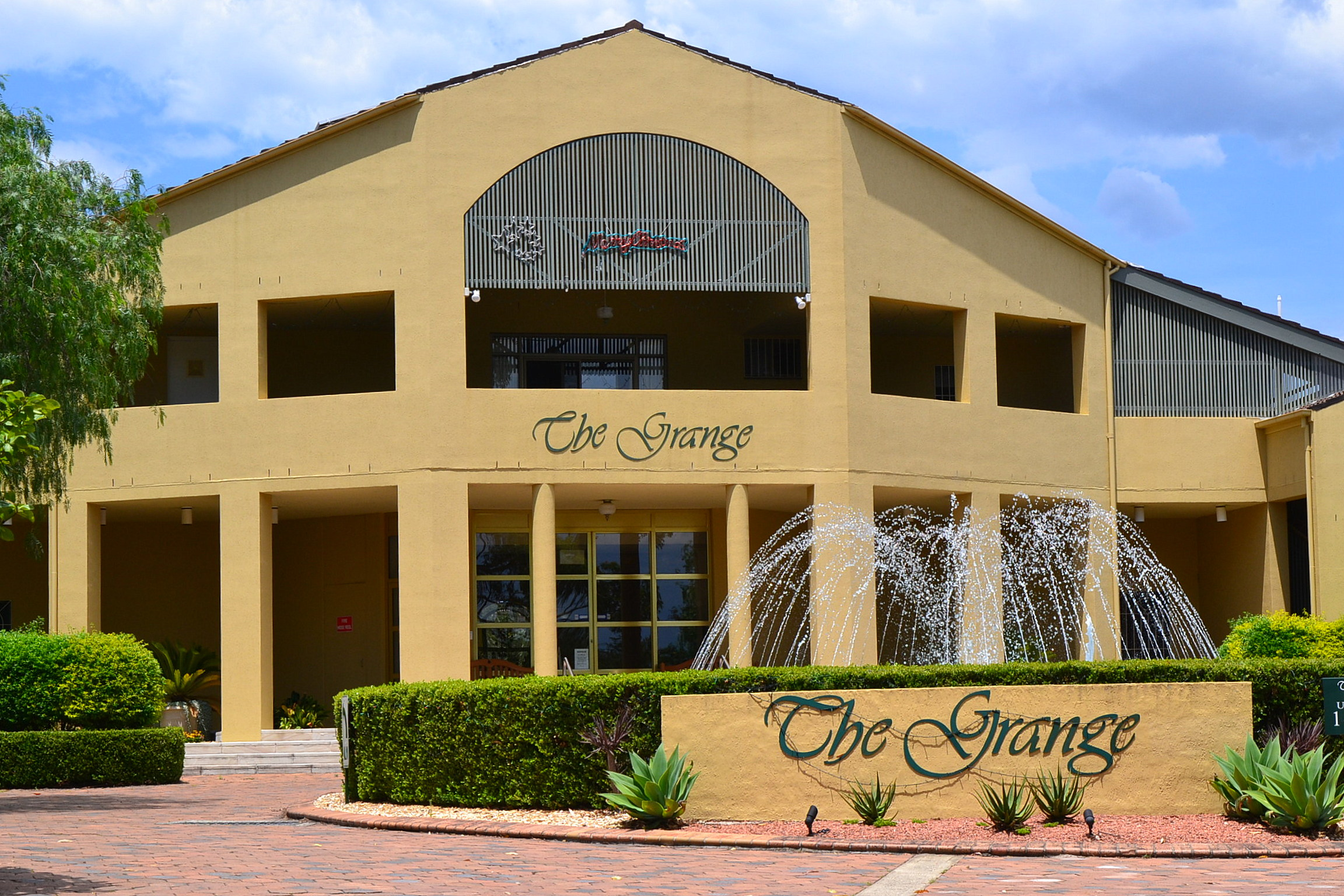
The Grange Village, an over 55s lifestyle village built by Lend Lease

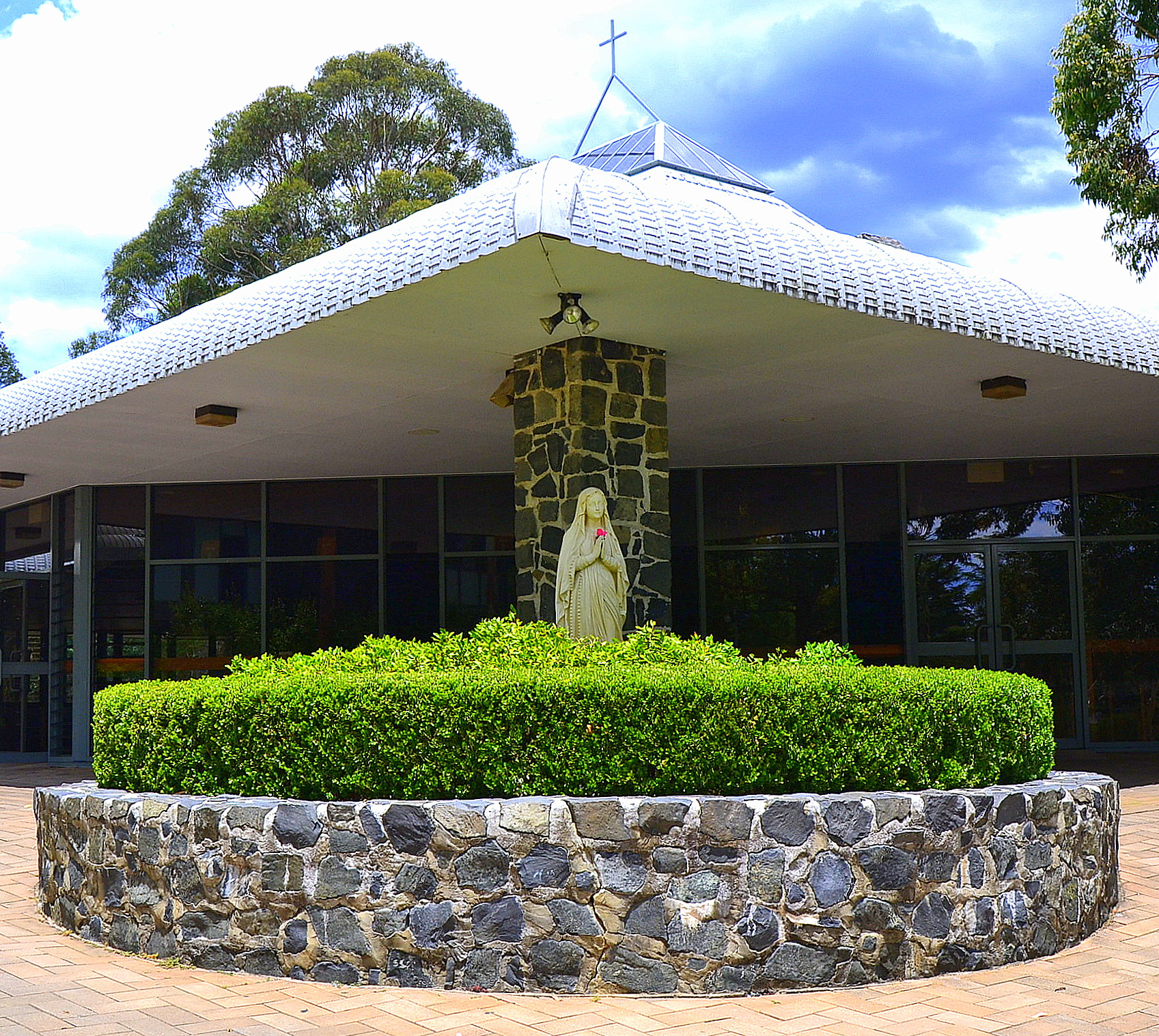
Our Lady of the Rosary Cathedral

Waitara is a suburb in the Upper North Shore region of Sydney, in the state of New South Wales, Australia 19 kilometres north-west of the Sydney central business district, in the local government area of Hornsby Shire.

== History ==
Waitara is a word in the Māori language that means hail, pure water or hail, wide steps. (There is also a town in New Zealand named "Waitara".)

=== European settlement ===
Myles McRae once owned land in Southern Sydney, near Hurstville. When he sold that land to a development company, the manager used the name Waitara for the subdivision project. McCrae later bought land near Hornsby and when the railway station opened in 1895 he suggested the name Waitara, which was formally adopted.

Waitara Post Office opened on 1 October 1913 and closed in 1986. Waitara East Post Office opened on 1 June 1966 and closed in 1994.

== Transport ==
Waitara railway station is on the North Shore railway line of the Sydney Trains network. It was originally known as Sandy Bank.

CDC NSW operates five bus routes through the suburb of Waitara:

- 575: Macquarie University to Hornsby
- 587: Westleigh to Hornsby
- 589: Sydney Adventist Hospital to Hornsby
- 591: St Ives to Hornsby
- 600: Parramatta to Hornsby

== Commercial and community facilities ==
Waitara's commercial centre is along the Pacific Highway, which includes various shops and a pub, the Blue Gum Hotel. A pub has existed in some form on the same site as the current Blue Gum Hotel since 1884 with varying different names, but two fires destroyed the original hotel buildings. The current building was completed in 1962.

On the other side of the railway station, there is a rugby league club, a gym, a retirement village, and a large oval named after cricketer and commentator Mark Taylor. Police & Community Youth Clubs also has a facility that is used for indoor sports, gymnastics, and events, and has a café inside.

== Schools ==
- The public school is Waitara Public School, which has two O.C (opportunity class) classes. (Located in Wahroonga).
- The Catholic school is Our Lady of the Rosary Primary School. It was established in approximately 1918 and was located on the Pacific Highway opposite the railway station. It has since been relocated to Yardley Avenue.

== Churches ==
- Our Lady of the Rosary Catholic Church was originally situated on the Pacific Highway opposite Hornsby railway station. It was later relocated to 27 Yardley Avenue. It has since become the cathedral church of the Roman Catholic Diocese of Broken Bay and is known as Our Lady of the Rosary Cathedral, Waitara. It is the namesake of the hymn tune Waitara.
- Waitara is home to a large Korean Catholic Community Church, which has produced the youth activity group WCKYS. The latter can be divided into three subgroups: Kerygma, J.O.Y. and Youth Legion of Mary. Kerygma group organises the youth mass, while J.O.Y. (Jesus Others and You) consists of teachers of Waitara Korean Sunday School.
- The Anglican Church of Waitara (All Saints) is located on the corner of Burdett Street and Palmerston Road. In addition to church services, there are a number of other events during the week including ESL classes, children's groups, youth groups and Bible studies.
- The Seventh-day Adventist Church, located at the corner of Park Avenue and Alexandria Parade, was established in 1903.

== Population ==
The 2021 census community profile for Waitara revealed roughly equal proportions of men (48.4%) and women (51.6%) in a total population of 7,837. The median age of the Waitara population was 36 years of age, which was similar to the national median of 38. The most common ancestries in Waitara were Chinese 25.5%, Indian 17.0%, English 12.3%, Australian 10.3% and Korean 4.8%. 31.4% of people were born in Australia, the next most common countries of birth were India 16.2%, China 14.7%, South Korea 3.6%, Philippines, 3.5% and Iran 3.4%. 30.6% of people spoke only English at home. Other languages spoken at home included Mandarin 15.5%, Hindi 7.0%, Cantonese 6.2%, and Persian (excluding Dari) 3.8%. The average household had 2.4 people. The most common responses for religion were No Religion 34.3%, Hinduism 19.2%, and Catholicism 13.6%.
