= North Wahroonga =

- Suburb
- Interactive map of North Wahroonga
- Country: Australia
- State: New South Wales
- City: Sydney
- LGA: Ku-ring-gai Council
- Location: 23 km (14 mi) north-west of Sydney CBD
- Established: 1822

Government
  - State electorate: Wahroonga
  - Federal division: Bradfield
- Elevation: 194 m (636 ft)

Population
  - Total: 2,100 (2021 census)
- Postcode: 2076
Suburbs around North Wahroonga
Asquith	Mount Colah	North Turramurra
Hornsby	North Wahroonga	North Turramurra
Waitara	Wahroonga	Wahroonga

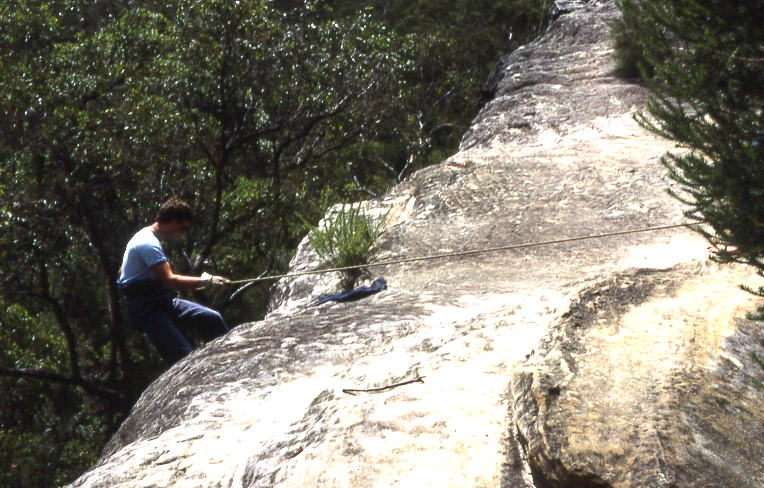
Abseiling in bush near Cliff Avenue

North Wahroonga is a suburb on the Upper North Shore of Sydney, in the state of New South Wales, Australia. North Wahroonga is located 23 kilometres north-west of the Sydney central business district, in the local government area of Ku-ring-gai Council. Wahroonga is a separate suburb, to the south.

North Wahroonga is bounded by the F3 Sydney-Newcastle Freeway on the west and the Ku-ring-gai Chase National Park on the north.

== History ==
Wahroonga is an Aboriginal word meaning our home.

=== European settlement ===
In the early days of British settlement in New South Wales, the main activity was cutting down the tall trees which grew there. The Wahroonga area was first settled in 1822 by Thomas Hyndes, a convict who became a wealthy landowner. Later there were many orchards, and when the railway was built it became a popular place for businessmen to build out-of-town residences with large gardens in the 1920s and 1930s.

== Transport ==
CDC NSW operates two bus routes through North Wahroonga:

- 576: North Wahroonga to Wahroonga
- 576T: North Wahroonga to Turramurra

== Population ==
In the 2021 Census, there were 2,100 people in North Wahroonga. 58.0% of people were born in Australia. The next most common countries of birth were China 7.0%, and South Africa 5.2%. 70.0% of people spoke only English at home. The most common responses for religion were No Religion 36.0%, Catholic 18.9%, and Anglican 17.0%.
