= Arthur Baldwinson =

Australian architect

- Born: Arthur Norman Baldwinson; 26 February 1908; Kalgoorlie, Western Australia
- Died: 25 August 1969 (aged 61); St Leonards, Sydney, Australia
- Education: Gordon Institute of Technology (now Deakin University), Geelong
- Occupation: Architect
- Years active: 1931–1960
- Awards: Sir John Sulman Medal, 1956
- Practice: Baldwinson, Booth and Peters
- Buildings: Beaufort House, Hotel Belmont, Dobell House
- Projects: MARS
- Design: Early Australian modernism, the 'Artist's Architect'

Arthur Norman Baldwinson (1908–1969) was one of Australia's first generation of prominent modernist architects to experience the European modernist movement first hand. His modernist contemporaries include Roy Grounds and Frederick Romberg in Victoria, as well as Sydney Ancher and Walter Bunning in New South Wales; their respective Australian architectural careers in modernism began in the late 1930s. Baldwinson's active professional career as an active practising architect was relatively short (1938–1960).

== Early life ==
A talented sketcher, Baldwinson was encouraged to study architecture and in June 1925 enrolled at the Gordon Institute of TAFE, Geelong, Victoria. Baldwinson won the William Campbell sketching competition in 1930 and next year was admitted as an associate of the Royal Victorian Institute of Architects (RVIA). (Bogle, M, 2011) He also won first prize in the 1930 RVIA Bronze Medal for measured architectural drawing (student prize). Baldwinson's winning entry was described in the RVIA Journal "to be congratulated upon the very excellent standard of his work throughout, which in the opinion of the assessors, in every way merits the award of the R.V.I.A. Bronze Medal. The composition of the sheets has been skilfully handled and the drafting and rendering in particular, are excellent. The field notes also exhibit evidence of considerable skill with the pencil on the part of the competitor and of precision and care in the measuring of the work." In 1931 Baldwinson was awarded first prize in the Drawing and Design (Silver Medal) for students by the RVIA.

The Depression brought building to a standstill. After saving £42 for the fare, in April 1931 Baldwinson reached London where he was employed as a casual illustrator and in the office of the Australian-born architect Raymond McGrath. (Apperly & Reynolds 1993, Baldwinson) Baldwinson described his own work as being "in the real spirit of modern architecture" (Arthur Baldwinson, diary 1934). On his return to Australia in 1936 he worked in both Sydney and Melbourne before establishing his own practice in 1938. (Apperly & Reynolds 1993, Baldwinson)

Baldwinson was inspired by modernism from his earliest designs. He looked to contemporary modernist principles and the theories of Walter Gropius, the founder of the Bauhaus. He became convinced that new building techniques allowed the architect to create original forms, cleansed of surface ornament and free from historical style. (Apperly & Reynolds 1993, Baldwinson)

== Biography ==
Baldwinson was born in Kalgoorlie, West Australia in 1908. He trained in architecture (1925–1929) under George R. King, the head of the architecture program at the Gordon Institute of Technology, Geelong, Victoria. Baldwinson's work, especially in the areas of drawing and rendering, was exemplary and this led King to ask him to stay on as 'Architectural Instructor'. Baldwinson held a teaching position from 1930 until 1932 when he left for London.

In London, Baldwinson was first employed in the office of Raymond McGrath, an architecture graduate from the University of Sydney. While there, Baldwinson worked alongside such major talents like Serge Chermayeff and Wells Coates. McGrath's practise at the time included designing the interiors for the BBC's studios at Portland Place, London. In mid-1934, Baldwinson worked for the firm Adams Thompson and Fry during the period when principal partner and co-founder of MARS (Modern Architectural Research Society), Maxwell Fry, in collaboration with social reformer Elizabeth Denby, was designing Kensal House, the progressive, modernist housing scheme for the Gas Light and Coke Company.

== Early career ==
In October 1934, Maxwell Fry formed a partnership with Walter Gropius with whom Baldwinson worked directly until early 1937. Gropius departed for the United States in March 1937. Baldwinson was actively involved in the design and drawings of Gropius's commissions including: Isokon 3 medium density project, Windsor; the E. W. Levy House, Chelsea; the Donaldson House, Sevenoaks; the Impington Village College, Cambridgeshire and the Christ's College project for Cambridge University.

=== Return to Australia ===
In January 1937, Baldwinson began his return trip to Australia with a determination to plant the flag of "the new architecture"; he took up a position with Stephenson & Meldrum, first in their Melbourne office, then later in Sydney as Stephenson & Turner. In early 1938 Baldwinson entered the annual Victorian Timber Development Association (TDA) prize for residential timber buildings and won in three categories. Soon after this success, he established his own practice in Pitt Street, Sydney. In 1938–1939, he formed a brief design partnership with fellow-West Australian, John Oldham (Oldham & Baldwinson) to design a workers' housing project near Coomaditchy Lagoon, Port Kembla.

In 1938, Baldwinson had his first solo commission, Collins House at Palm Beach. Baldwinson designed a red-stained weatherboard house on a sandstone plinth comprising an external stair ramp, two bedrooms, upper-level verandah and playroom on the lower level. The house received considerable media attention.

=== World War II service and the Beaufort Division ===
During World War II, Baldwinson worked for the Commonwealth Aircraft Corporation designing and constructing buildings engaged in the manufacture of aircraft. By 1943, he had been promoted Chief Architect of the Beaufort Division, Department of Aircraft Production (DAP). Baldwinson later developed an all-steel pre-fabricated 'Beaufort' house for DAP post-war sale to the Victorian Housing Commission in 1946. This was Australia's first fully factory-manufactured prefabricated steel house.

Arthur Baldwinson's dream of the 'machine-made house' was part of the early 20th century modernist vision of standardised housing with factory-produced interchangeable components, modular plans and elevations produced at a price accessible to every citizen.

The ambitious prefabricated steel house known as the 'Beaufort House' was designed and developed by the Beaufort Division of the Commonwealth Department of Aircraft Production (DAP). located at Fishermen's Bend, Melbourne and Essendon Airport. The highly efficient Beaufort Division manufactured twin engine Beaufort Bombers under license during World War II.The Beaufort House was designed by Arthur Baldwinson (Chief Architect) and the staff of the Beaufort Division.

Eight models of the steel house were designed but only one prototype had been fabricated by the first exhibition date in 1946. While it is not clear if all models proceeded to prototype, two types were built (Type 2 and Type 8) and supplied as public projects in Melbourne and Canberra. The Beaufort House was first exhibited in 1946 in Treasury Gardens, Melbourne and its second appearance was in 1947 in the Canberra suburb of Ainslie. (Bogle, M, 2011)

=== MARS ===
In 1939, Baldwinson became a founding member of the Modern Architectural Research Society (MARS) which was disbanded late in 1943 when most of its members were away on war service. MARS Group, was a British architectural think tank founded in 1933 by several prominent architects and architectural critics of the time involved in the British modernist movement. The quiet, unassuming modesty which had so endeared Arthur Baldwinson to his friends may help to explain why his achievement was relatively unrecognised in his lifetime.(Bogle, M, 2011, MARS) Baldwinson was also on the organising committee for the formation Australia's first industrial design organisation, the 'Design and Industries Association of Australia' (DIAA).

== Career after World War II ==
In 1946, Baldwinson returned to Sydney and formed a partnership with Melbourne engineer, Eric Gibson. As Gibson and Baldwinson, Gibson managed the office in Melbourne and Baldwinson supervised the Sydney office. In this partnership Baldwinson produced his best residential designs for a number of Sydney's Contemporary Artists Society (CAS) members. These avant-garde clients included Alistair Morrison, William Dobell, Harold Clay, Geoff and Dahl Collings, James Andriesse, Max Dupain and Elaine Haxton. In 1950 he concluded his partnership and applied for a lectureship at Sydney University School of Architecture, Design and Planning. By 1952, he was a Senior Lecturer in the architecture faculty.

In 1953, Baldwinson formed a partnership with Charles Vernon Sylvester-Booth; in 1956 Charles Peters joined the firm to form Baldwinson, Booth and Peters. The partnership lasted until 1958 with Baldwinson concentrating on residential designs, which he favoured, while Booth and Peters pursued commercial work. One of their designs, Hotel Belmont, near Newcastle won the NSW RAIA Sir John Sulman Medal in 1956.

During this partnership, Baldwinson also designed the Mandl House, Wahroonga (1953) and the Simpson-Lee House, Wahroonga (1957). He also designed and built his own residence at 79 Carlotta Street, Greenwich (1954) funded by his teacher's salary. The Carlotta Street house is the most precise essay on Baldwinson's restrained modernist philosophy. Baldwinson's palette of materials was consistent throughout his practice: bagged brick, weatherboard or vertical tongue-and-groove cladding and concrete contrasted against the irregularities of regional sandstone. Although his practice was occasionally involved in commercial commissions, his greatest accomplishments lie in the adaptation of the principles and materials of European modernism for site-specific suburban Australian houses. He helped to pioneer free-plan concepts, site-adjusted residential design, the 'scientific kitchen', flat roof treatments and the functional placement of windows and doors to create a distinctly regional variation of European modernism. In his development of a Sydney basin form of regional modernism, he is a precursor to the much-debated 'Sydney School' of residential architecture of the later 20th century. Internal disputes forced the dissolution of the Baldwinson, Booth and Peters partnership and Baldwinson immediately formed a new partnership with recent Sydney University graduate Geoffrey Twibill. The partnership lasted until late 1959.

Late in 1960, Baldwinson closed his formal practice but continued to teach and accept private commissions in the Sydney suburbs, designing the Hauslaib House, Point Piper (1960), Pennington House, Whale Beach (1960), Robinson House, Castle Cove (1963) and his last completed house for the artist Desiderius Orban, in Northwood (1968). He continued to teach at the University of Sydney until 1969. With Elspeth, he travelled abroad in 1961 and 1966–1967. At weekends he visited and photographed old buildings for the NSW branch of the National Trust of Australia. Baldwinson died of myocardial infarction on 25 August 1969 in Royal North Shore Hospital.

== Gallery ==
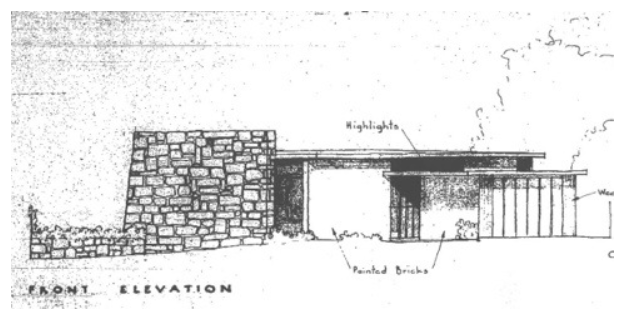
Front elevation of the Andriesse House, 1947

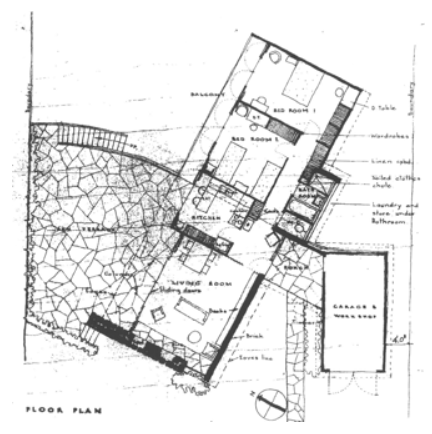
Floor plan of the Andriesse House, 1947

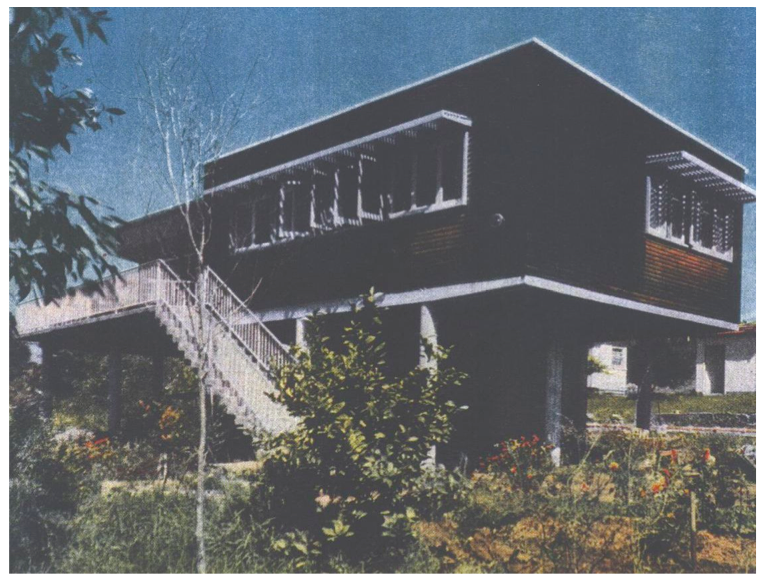
Photograph of the Clay House from Australian Home Beautiful (cover)

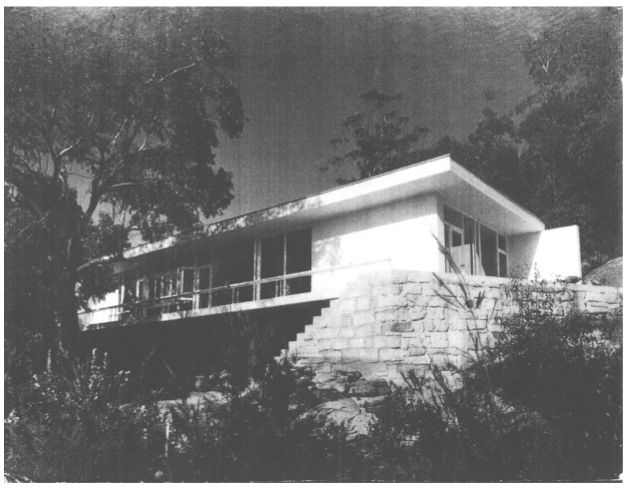
Photograph of the Collings House, 1950

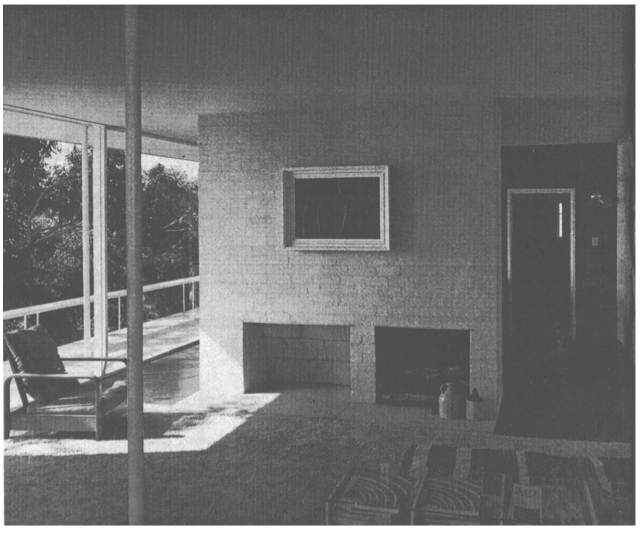
Interior photograph of the Collings House, 1950

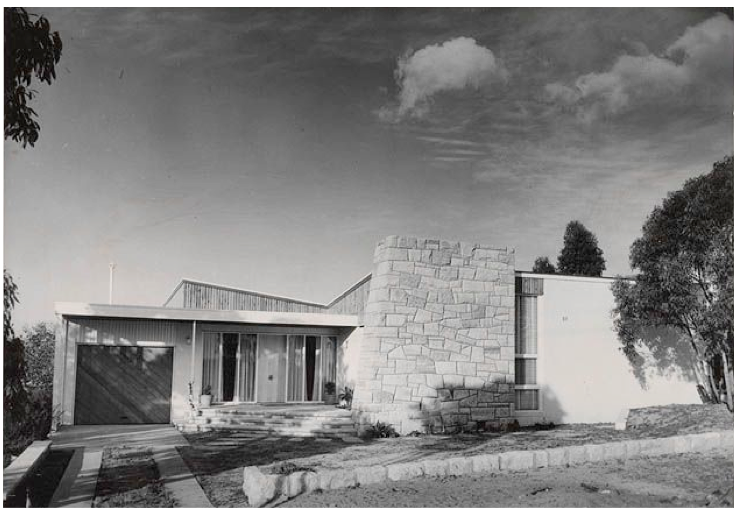
Photograph of the Davies House, 1951

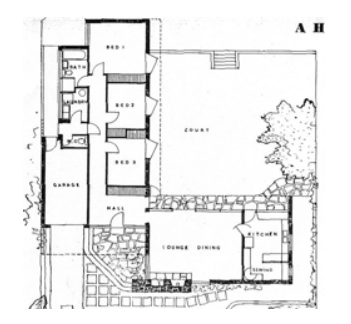
Floor plan for the Davies House, 1951

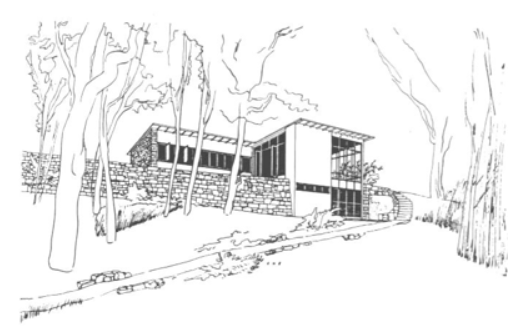
Sketch design for the Dobell House with the final composition reversed.

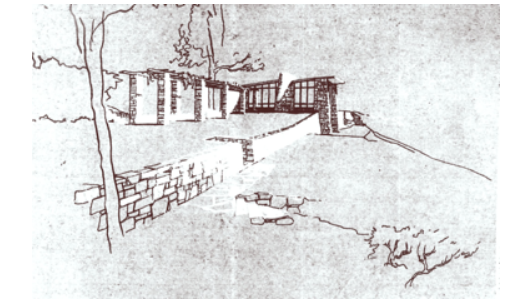
Sketch design B for the Dobell House 1947

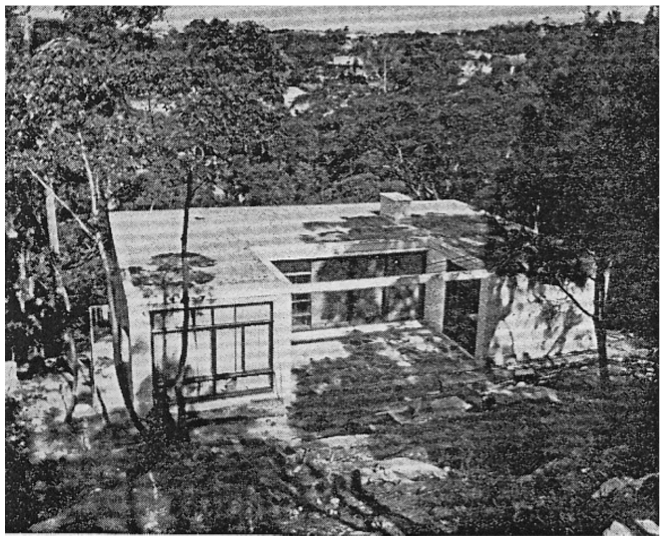
Photograph of the Abbot House, 1951

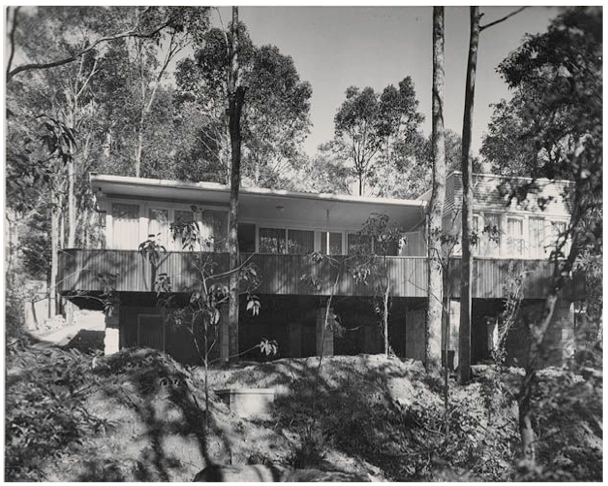
Photograph of the Adnam House, 1950

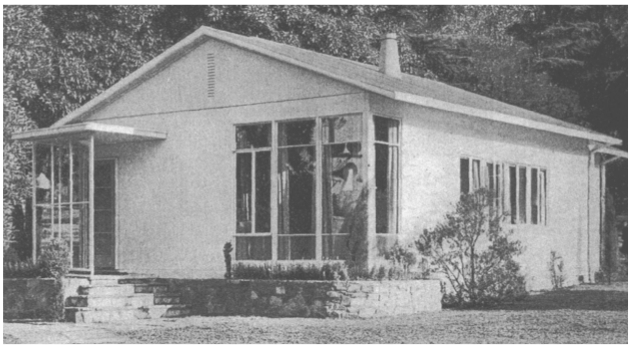
From the Beaufort Homes Brochure

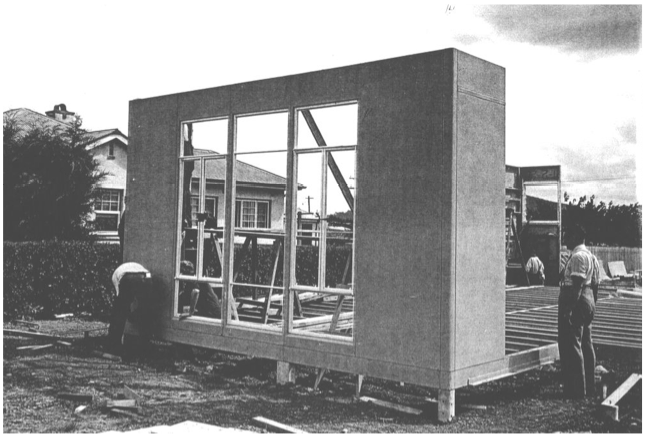
Beaufort House under construction

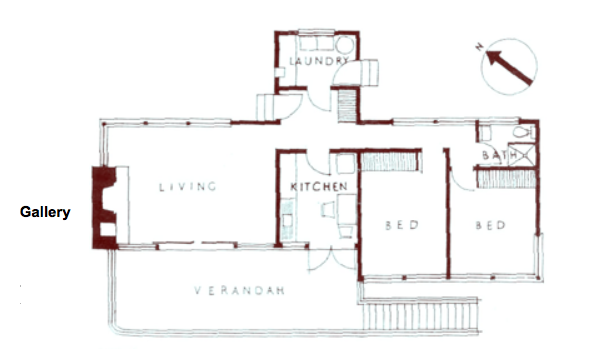
Floor plan for the Wilkinson House, 1947
