= Berowra (disambiguation) =

Berowra in New South Wales is a suburb of northern Sydney, Australia. It is also the namesake of the Division of Berowra, an Australian Electoral Division that includes that suburb and others

Berowra may also refer to :

- Berowra Heights, a neighbouring suburb
- Berowra Waters, a neighbouring suburb
- Berowra railway station, in the suburb
