= Berowra Creek, New South Wales =

Berowra Creek
- Suburb
- Interactive map of Berowra Creek
- Coordinates: 33°34′37″S 151°7′41″E
- Country: Australia
- State: New South Wales
- LGA: Hornsby Shire

Government
  - State electorate: Hawkesbury
  - Federal division: Berowra

Population
  - Total: 213 (2011 census)

Berowra Creek was a remote northern suburb of Sydney, in the state of New South Wales, Australia. The former suburb of Berowra Creek was composed of several different waterfront locations near and around the 30 km long Berowra Creek watercourse, within the Hornsby Shire Council area. Access to these waterfront locations is via boat only. The use of the name "Berowra Creek" as a suburb was discontinued in 2021, with the area being merged into the neighbouring locality of Berowra Waters.

== Population ==
According to the 2011 census of Population, there were 213 residents in Berowra Creek. 82.4% of people were born in Australia. The most common countries of birth were England 5.1%, New Zealand 2.3% and Hong Kong (SAR of China) 1.4%. 90.3% of people only spoke English at home. The only other responses for 'language spoken at home' were Urdu 3.2%, Dutch 1.4% and Greek 1.4%. The most common responses for religious affiliation were Anglican 35.6%, No Religion 21.8% and Catholic 20.8%.
