= Maroota =

- Suburb
- Interactive map of Maroota
- Country: Australia
- State: New South Wales
- LGA: The Hills Shire and Hornsby Shire
- Location: 49 km (30 mi) northwest of Sydney CBD

Government
  - State electorates: Hawkesbury; Hornsby
  - Federal division: Berowra
- Elevation: 228 m (748 ft)

Population
  - Total: 616 (2021 census)
- Postcode: 2756
Suburbs around Maroota
Leets Vale	Webbs Creek	Wisemans Ferry
Lower Portland	Maroota	Laughtondale
South Maroota	Glenorie	Canoelands

Maroota is a suburb to the north-northwest of Sydney, New South Wales, Australia. Maroota is located 49 kilometres from the Sydney central business district, in the local government areas of The Hills Shire and Hornsby Shire. Maroota along with its surrounding suburbs, including Wisemans Ferry on the Hawkesbury river to its north, are geographically the northern most suburbs in Sydney.

Maroota is located at a high point, about 200 m above sea-level, on the ridge-following Great Northern Road (now renamed Old Northern Road). This was the main early road, constructed by convict gangs, from Sydney north to Singleton in the Hunter Valley.

Maroota is situated on, and owes its nature to, a residual mass of Tertiary river sand deposit (the Maroota Sand) which geologists think may be the oldest known remnant of the largest waterway in the Sydney region, the Nepean-Hawkesbury system.

== History ==
The first attempt to settle Maroota, as a soldier-settlement, failed totally. Some of the soldiers leaving the Army during an across-the-Empire downsizing in the wake of the Napoleonic wars bought land (sight-unseen) at Maroota, hoping to begin new lives as farmers. However, all of them as soon as they visited their new purchases were shocked and disappointed with what they found. They protested to the government that such barren sandy soil could never support them and their families, asking for replacement land to be granted to them elsewhere. What these early men did not know was that at but a short depth below surface the Maroota Sand was rich in groundwater. Later on, the land proved quite good and profitable for a variety of farming and orchard growing applications, and for limited grazing, once its true values and potential were realised.

A Weaver's Post Office was open by 1 January 1927. In 1956 its name was changed to Maroota, and it was closed in 1969.

In recent years Maroota has undergone transformation, becoming a growing centre of sand mining. As Sydney's major sand and gravel quarrying centre, at Castlereagh just north of Penrith, nears the end of its life Maroota becomes increasingly important for supplying sand to many users in the metropolis.

In 1970 Sydney's largest naturist club, Kiata Country Club, was established at South Maroota.

One Study, commenced in 2005, which seeks to draw together the history of Maroota, especially the natural and Aboriginal history, is at http://maroota.sands.googlepages.com

== Heritage listings ==
Maroota South has a number of heritage-listed sites, including:

- Wisemans Ferry Road: Great Drain
