= Fagan Park =

Park in Sydney, Australia

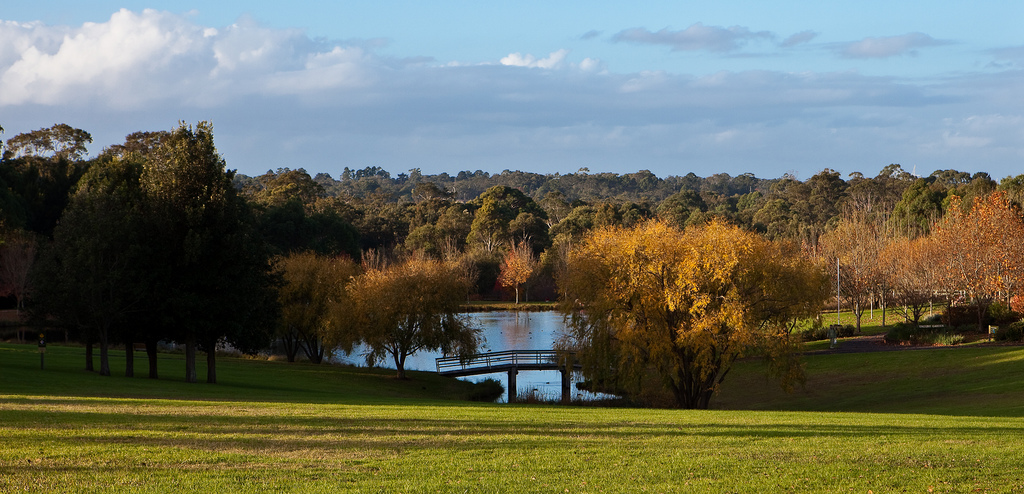
- Fagan Park in May 2009

- Location within Sydney
- Type: Urban Park
- Location: 38–48 Arcadia Road Galston, New South Wales
- Coordinates: 33°38′27″S 151°02′36″E
- Area: 55 ha (140 acres)
- Created: 1988
- Operator: Hornsby Shire Council
- Open: All year except Christmas Day
- Website: Hornsby Shire Council

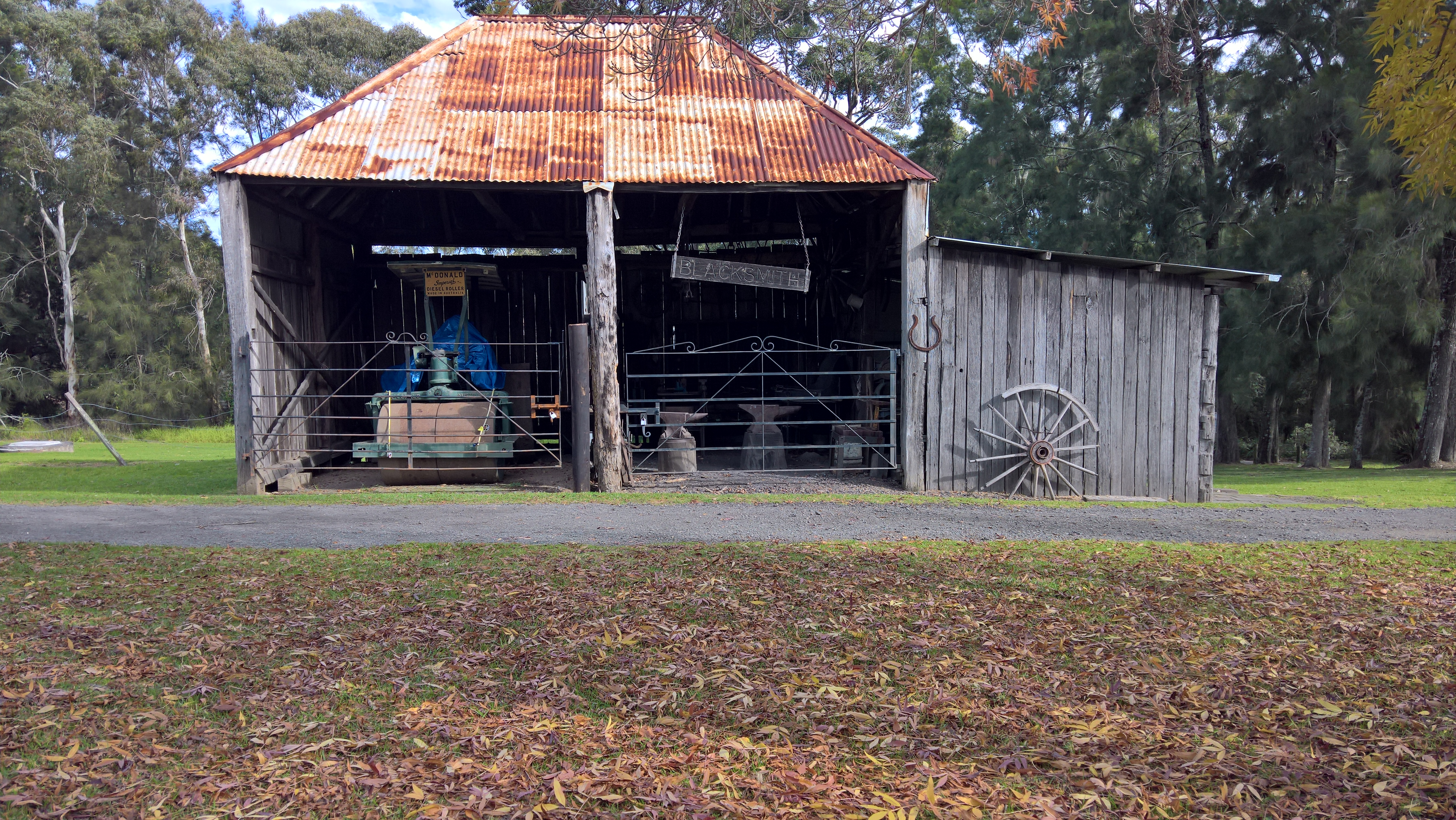
Part of the Fagan Park Museum

Fagan Park is a large recreational area located in Galston, a semi-rural area in Sydney, New South Wales, Australia. The park has been managed by Hornsby Shire since its opening in 1988, and covers an area of 55 hectares. The land that is now the park was home to the Fagan family until 1980, when Bruce Fagan and his sister, Ida, donated the land to the New South Wales State Government. Hornsby Shire Council was appointed sole trustee. The park was officially opened by the Premier of New South Wales, Nick Greiner, MP on 5 November 1988.

== History ==
=== The Fagan Family ===
William Fagan was a free settler who emigrated from Derry in Ireland who arrived in Sydney in 1848. He later married Ann Waddell and the couple had three sons and four daughters. After their marriage the Fagans purchased 70 acres (28 ha) of land in Arcadia, New South Wales and the family established a successful citrus orchard. They were pioneers in the citrus industry in Dural, Galston and Arcadia, on the north-western outskirts of Sydney. Two of William and Ann's sons, William and Samuel, worked in the family business and later began their own operation at Dural. In 1900, Samuel and his wife acquired land at Galston and conducted their business on the property. They constructed 'Netherby,' a house made of bricks that were hand made. The property was the largest orchard in Galston and had a sizable workforce.

By the early 1930s, because of the arrival of the Great Depression, Samuel Fagan commenced to closed down his orchards. Bruce Fagan, the youngest child in the family, ran a herd of Jersey dairy cattle on the property after the closure of the orchard. He later added a dairy building to the property and commenced a renowned cattle breeding programme. In 1980 Bruce Fagan and his sister, Ida, donated the original property, "Fagan Park," to the Department of Lands. The Hornsby Shire Council was appointed as the sole trustee for the park. Before his death in 1984, Bruce Fagan was consulted regarding development plans for the site.

=== Bicentennial project ===
The Bicentenary of Australia was celebrated in 1988. It marked the occasion of the beginning of European settlement of Australia, with the arrival of the First Fleet of British convict ships at Sydney in 1788. A national programme of events and celebrations was organised to celebrate the occasion and Fagan Park was adopted as Hornsby Shire Council's bicentennial project. The Council received a government grant towards the cost of the planned "Garden of Many Nations." The garden now covers 10 ha (25 acres) of the park and features the flora of countries from all over the world including North America and South America, Great Britain, Africa, Asia and the Netherlands The original homestead, 'Netherby', together with the original milking complex and packing shed, were also restored for the bicentennial year. "Netherby" is regularly opened for inspection and the packing shed and milking complex are used as a rural museum.

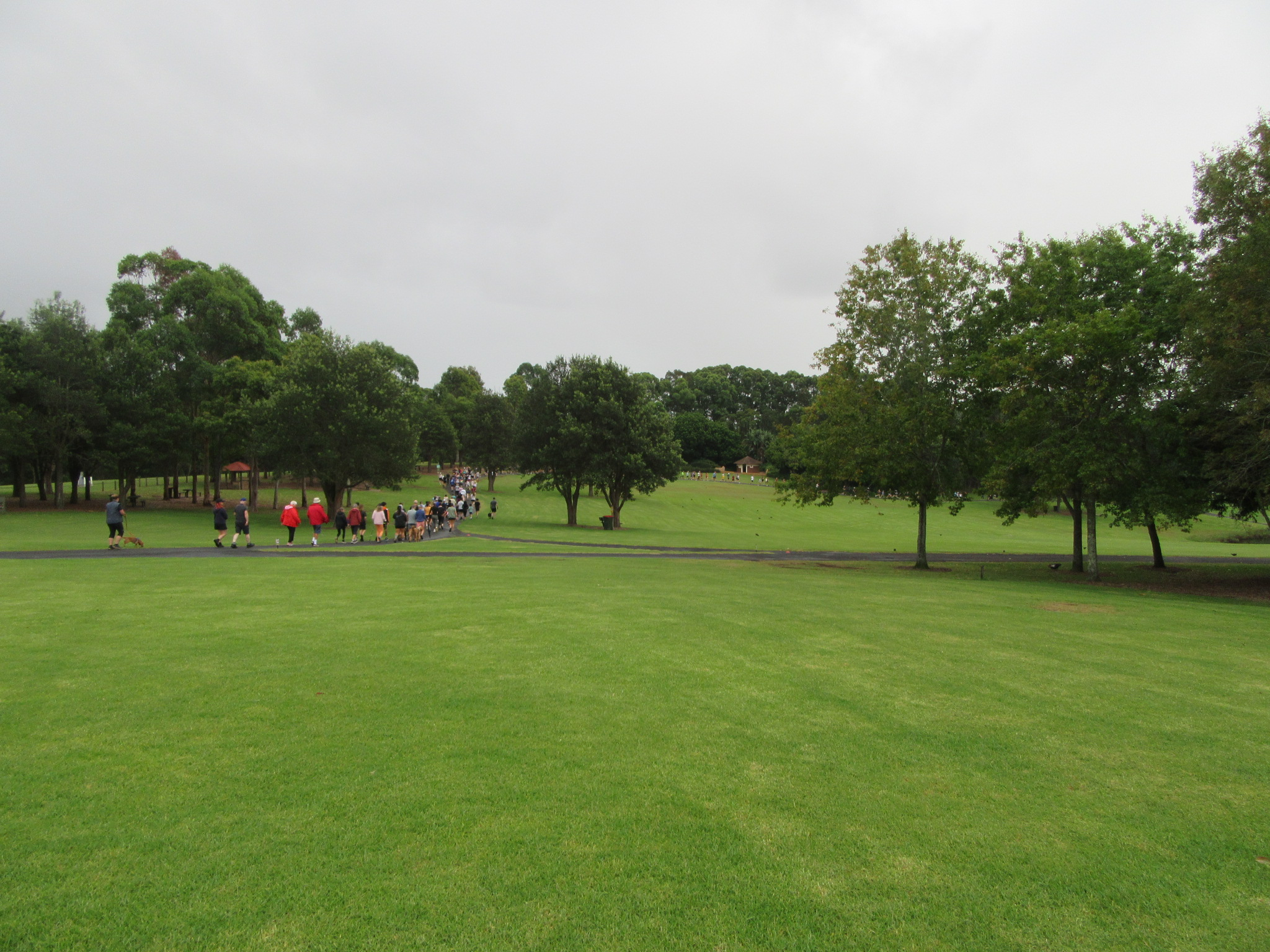
Fagan Park Galston showing start of Parkrun on 16 March 2024

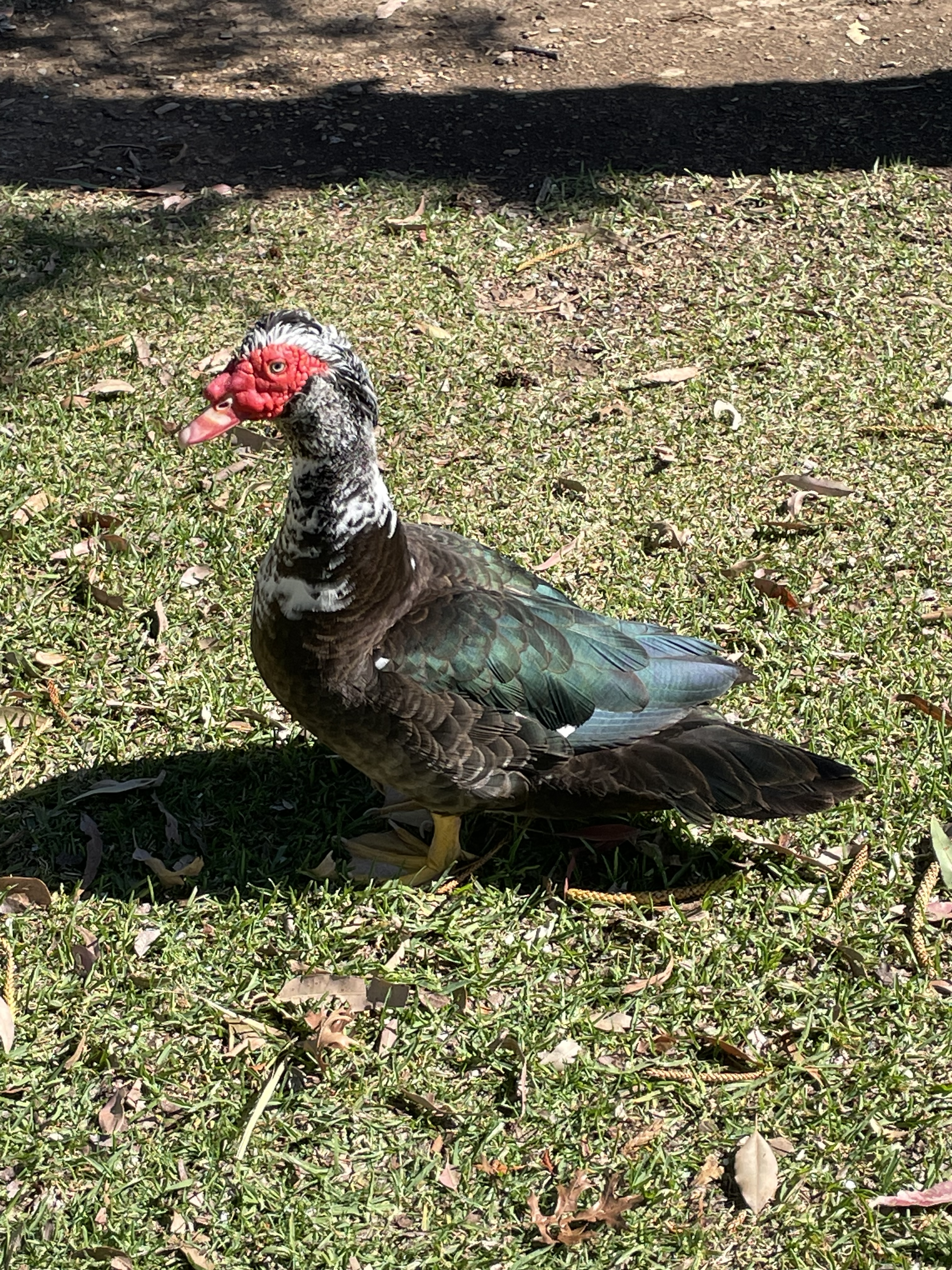
A muscovy duck located in Fagan Park.

== Sport and recreation ==
- The Galston Parkrun event is held every Saturday at 8 am. This is a timed run over 5 kilometres. It is organised by volunteers and is free of charge.
- The Hornsby Electric Model Flying Club meets in the park.
- The Friends of Fagan Park open all museums on Tuesdays (their volunteering day, from 1-4pm on the second Sunday each month, and conduct open days each year.
- The Fagan Park Eco Garden is a Council-driven community initiative that showcases environmentally friendly gardening techniques. Workshops are held regularly.
- Carr's Bush is an 8.5-hectare (21-acre) area of remnant bushland within the park. It contains a network of short walking trails.
- The "Garden of Many Nations" is available to all visitors to the park.

== Facilities ==
There are many facilities for visitors to Fagan Park including:

- Picnic tables
- Large picnic shelters which can be hired which seat 18 to 36 people, depending on the size of the structure hired.
- Barbecues
- Children's playgrounds
- Bushwalking trails
- Sealed paths for bicycle riding, walking and running
- Toilets
