= Berowra Waters =

- Suburb
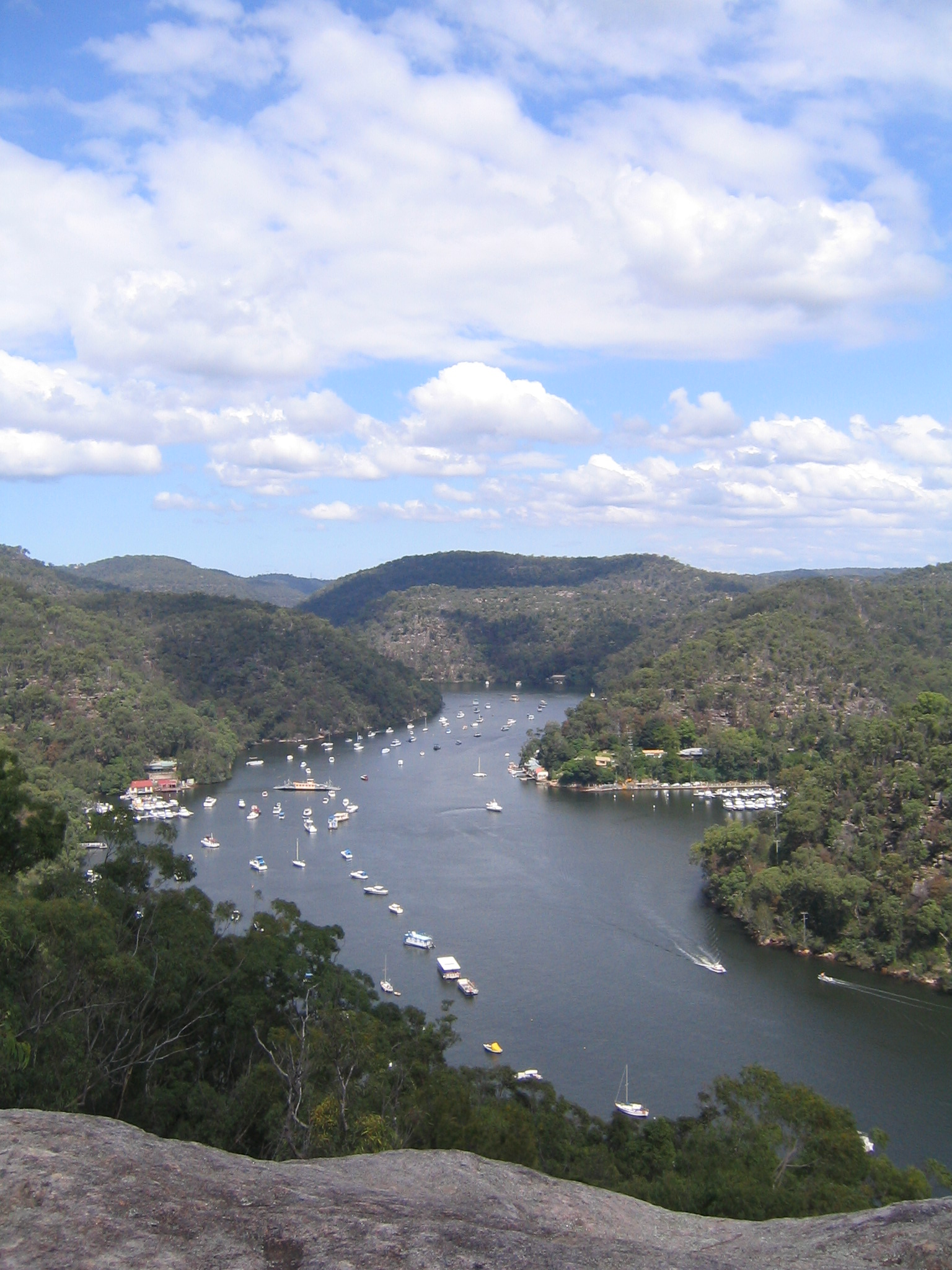
- Berowra Waters

- Interactive map of Berowra Waters
- Country: Australia
- State: New South Wales
- City: Sydney
- LGA: Hornsby Shire
- Location: 40 km (25 mi) north of Sydney CBD; 43 km (27 mi) south-west of Gosford

Government
  - State electorate: Hornsby
  - Federal division: Berowra
- Elevation: 7 m (23 ft)

Population
  - Total: 169 (2,021 Census)
- Postcode: 2082
Suburbs around Berowra Waters
Canoelands	Canoelands	Milsons Passage
Fiddletown	Berowra Waters	Cowan
Berrilee	Berowra Heights	Cowan

Berowra Waters is an outer suburb of Northern Sydney, in the state of New South Wales, Australia. Berowra is located 40 kilometres north of the Sydney central business district, in the local government area of Hornsby Shire. Berowra Waters is north-west of the suburbs of Berowra Heights and west of Berowra.

Berowra Waters is located on Berowra Creek, a tributary of the Hawkesbury River. The Berowra Waters Ferry, a toll-free car ferry, connects the east bank to the west bank with winding roads ascending uphill on both sides.

Notable residents include Australian actress Cate Blanchett and her husband Andrew Upton.

== History ==
It was thought that Berowra was an Aboriginal word that means place of many winds. However, it actually means 'place of many shells' referring to the many shell middens on Berowra Creek.

== Transport ==
A free three-lane punt, which operates 24/7, connects the two sides of Berowra Waters. The road on the eastern side has several hairpin bends.

== Landmarks ==
- Berowra Waters Inn was designed by architect Glenn Murcutt.
- Waterview Restaurant and Berowra Waters Marina.
