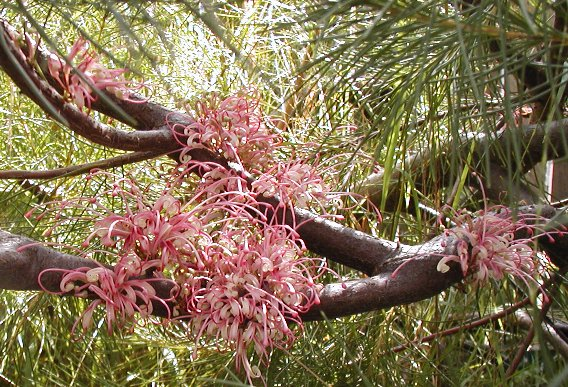

Scientific classification
- Kingdom: Plantae
- Clade: Tracheophytes
- Clade: Angiosperms
- Clade: Eudicots
- Order: Proteales
- Family: Proteaceae
- Genus: Hakea
- Species: H. bakeriana

Binomial name
- Hakea bakeriana F.Muell. & Maiden
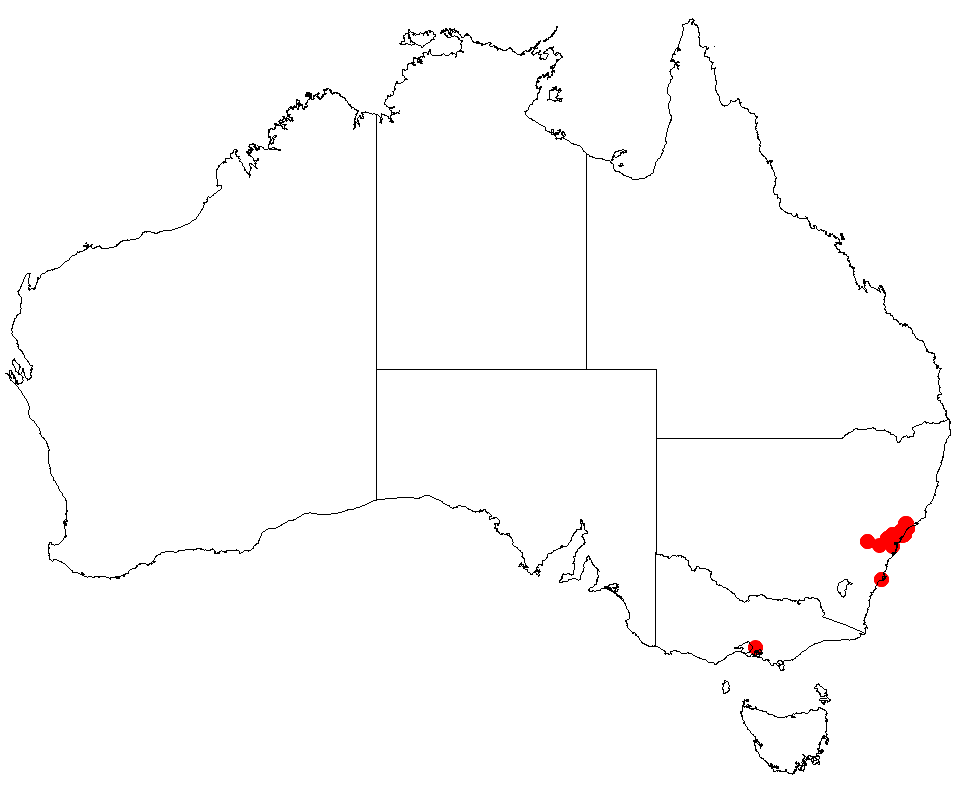
- Occurrence data from Australasian Virtual Herbarium

= Hakea bakeriana =

Species of shrub endemic to New South Wales, Australia

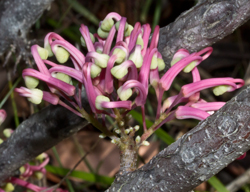
Flower close-up

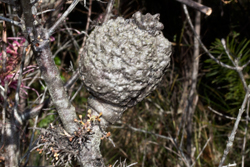
Fruit

Hakea bakeriana is a shrub in the family Proteaceae. It is endemic to the Central Coast of New South Wales, Australia. It is a dense shrub with sharply pointed, cylinder-shaped leaves and pink to crimson flowers in groups of between four and twelve. The fruit is a rough, wrinkled follicle which terminates in a short beak.

== Description ==
Hakea bakeriana is a dense, bushy, many-branched shrub growing to 1–2 m (3–7 ft) high and wide. It has a lignotuber from which it can resprout after fire. Smaller branches are densely covered in matted soft hairs. Simple leaves are cylindrical in shape, 5–11.5 cm (2–5 in) long and about 0.8–1.5 mm (0.03–0.06 in) in diameter, ending in a sharp point 0.7–1 mm (0.03–0.04 in) long. Between 4 and 12 fragrant flowers appear on a short, hairy, upright stem 4–30 mm (0.2–1 in) long. Flowers often appear below the leaves or from old wood. The pink to crimson perianth is 10–15 mm (0.4–0.6 in) long. The style is about 40 mm (2 in) long. Pinkish-white to deep pink flowers appear from late autumn to early spring. Woody fruit have a rough and deeply wrinkled surface with paler blister-like protuberances. Fruit are approximately 4.5–7 cm (2–3 in) long and 3.3–4.5 cm (1–2 in) wide. Fruit terminate in a beak either small and smooth or obscure.

== Taxonomy and naming ==
This species was first formally described by Ferdinand von Mueller and Joseph Maiden in 1892 from a specimen collected on "a barren patch of ground close to the bank of a creek at Wallsend". The description was published in the Macleay Memorial Volume of the Linnean Society of New South Wales. The specific epithet honours Richard Thomas Baker, teacher, economic botanist and later a curator of Sydney's Technological Museum.

== Distribution and habitat ==
Hakea bakeriana grows in heath, sclerophyll forest and in dry forests on the coast and nearby ranges of New South Wales between Newcastle and Glenorie.

== Use in horticulture ==
Hakes bakeriana has been grown for many years by local plant enthusiasts and is hardy in a range of soils and climates although does best in a sunny position. It is easily grown from seed but because of the species' restricted distribution, seed may be difficult to obtain.
