= Ahimsa (disambiguation) =

Ahimsa is a term meaning literally "non-harming", i.e. "non-violence".

Ahimsa may also refer to:

- Ahimsa in Jainism, a religious philosophy
- Ahinsa (1979 film), a 1979 Bollywood action film
- Ahimsa (1981 film), an Indian film in Malayalam
- Ahimsa (1987 film), a Sri Lankan film
- Ahimsa: Stop to Run, a 2005 Thai film
- Ahimsa, Cheltenham, the Marie Byles' house in Sydney, Australia
- "Ahimsa" (Supergirl), an episode of Supergirl
- "Ahimsa" (song), by U2
