= Forest Glen, New South Wales =

Forest Glen
- Suburb
- Interactive map of Forest Glen
- Coordinates: 33°33′2″S 151°1′11″E
- Country: Australia
- State: New South Wales
- City: Sydney
- LGA: Hornsby Shire
- Location: 54 km (34 mi) north-west of Sydney CBD

Government
  - State electorate: Hornsby
  - Federal division: Berowra
- Elevation: 204 m (669 ft)

Population
  - Total: 71 (SAL 2021)
- Postcode: 2157
Suburbs around Forest Glen
Canoelands	Canoelands	Canoelands
Glenorie	Forest Glen	Fiddletown
Glenorie	Glenorie	Fiddletown

Forest Glen is a semi-rural suburb of Sydney, in the state of New South Wales, Australia. Forest Glen is located 54 kilometres north of the Sydney central business district, in the local government area of Hornsby Shire and is part of the Hills District region.
