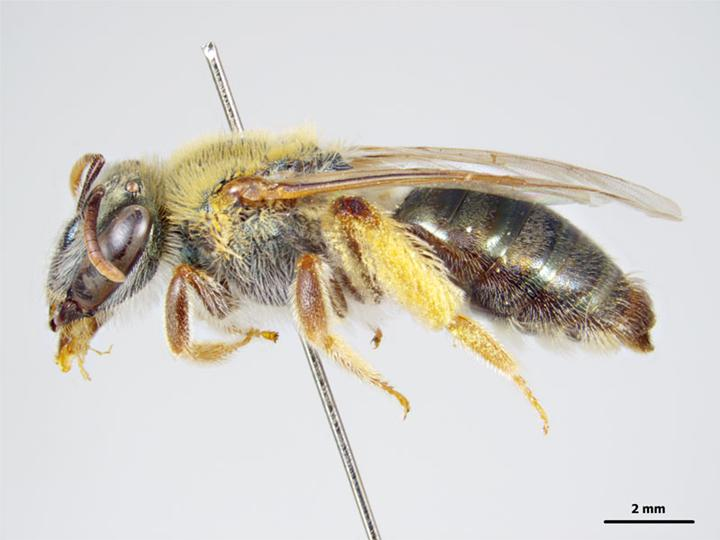
- Female

Scientific classification
- Kingdom: Animalia
- Phylum: Arthropoda
- Clade: Pancrustacea
- Class: Insecta
- Order: Hymenoptera
- Family: Colletidae
- Genus: Leioproctus
- Species: L. amabilis

Binomial name
- Leioproctus amabilis (Smith, 1879)

Synonyms
- Lamprocolletes amabilis Smith, 1879; Paracolletes carinatulus Cockerell, 1905; Paracolletes cupreus semipurpureus Cockerell, 1905; Paracolletes melbournensis Cockerell, 1910; Paracolletes mimulus Cockerell, 1910; Paracolletes ornatissimus Cockerell, 1916; Lamprocolletes cupreus minor Friese, 1924; Paracolletes semipurpureus frenchi Cockerell, 1929; Paracolletes festivus Cockerell, 1929; Paracolletes amabilis rufipes Cockerell, 1929

= Leioproctus amabilis =

Species of bee

Leioproctus amabilis, or Leioproctus (Leioproctus) amabilis, is a species of bee in the family Colletidae and subfamily Colletinae. It is endemic to Australia. It was described by English entomologist Frederick Smith in 1879.

== Distribution and habitat ==
The species occurs in eastern mainland Australia as well as in south-western Australia. Type localities include Oxley and Mackay, Queensland, Sydney and Berowra in New South Wales, as well as Melbourne and Rutherglen in Victoria.

== Behaviour ==
The adults are flying mellivores. Flowering plants visited by the bees include Eucalyptus and Melaleuca species.

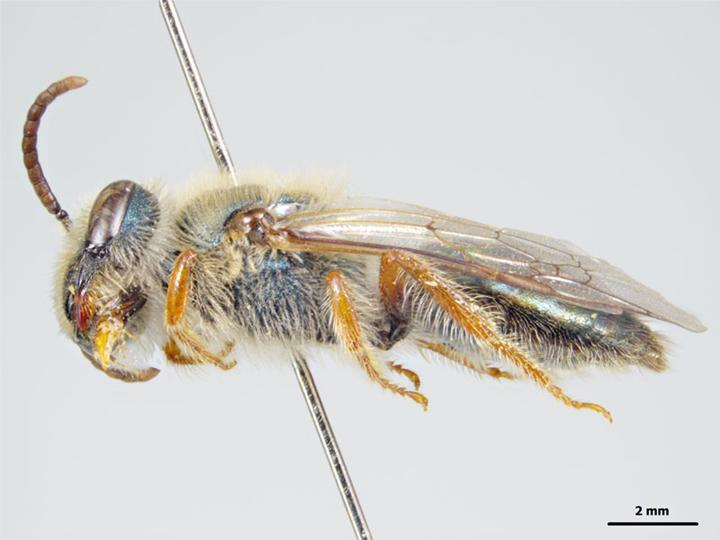
Male
