= Middle Dural =

- Suburb
- Interactive map of Middle Dural
- Coordinates: 33°39′20″S 151°1′15″E
- Country: Australia
- State: New South Wales
- City: Sydney
- LGAs: The Hills Shire; Hornsby Shire
- Location: 37 km (23 mi) north-west of Sydney CBD

Government
  - State electorates: Castle Hill; Hornsby
  - Federal division: Berowra
- Elevation: 181 m (594 ft)

Population
  - Total: 1,040 (2021 census)
- Postcode: 2158
Suburbs around Middle Dural
| Kenthurst | Glenorie | Arcadia |
| Kenthurst | Middle Dural | Arcadia |
| Dural | Dural | Galston |

Middle Dural is a semi-rural suburb of Sydney, in the state of New South Wales, Australia, 37 kilometres (23 mi) north-west of the Sydney central business district in the local government areas of Hornsby Shire and The Hills Shire. Dural is a separate suburb to the south.

== History ==
Dural is derived from Dooral-Dooral, an Aboriginal name meaning a smoking hollow tree. The original inhabitants of the Dural area were the Darug people. The name Dooral appeared on Surveyor James Meehan's map of April 1817 and originally covered the whole area including present day Glenorie, Galston, Arcadia and Dural. Timber cutters opened up the area in the early 19th century and the settlements were originally known as Upper, Middle, Lower, North and Little Dural. Located on the Old Northern Road, a historic road built by convicts between 1825 and 1836 to link early Sydney, in the Colony of New South Wales, with the fertile Hunter Valley to the north. In 1831 George Best established the Half-Way Inn at Middle Dural.

Since the 1970s the Banana Cabana Primate Sanctuary has existed in Middle Dural as a retirement facility for ex-circus and zoo monkeys such as hamadryas baboons, long-tailed macaques, rhesus macaques, black-handed spider monkeys, brown capuchins, common marmosets and even a tortoise species (leopard tortoise).

== Demographics ==
At the 2021 census, the suburb of Middle Dural recorded a population of 1,040 residents. Of these:

- The age distribution was older than the country in general: the median age was 46 years, compared to the national median of 38 years. Children aged under 15 years made up 17.8% of the population—the national average was 18.2%—and people aged 65 years and over made up 21.2% of the population, the national average was 17.2%.
- 73.4% were born in Australia, the next most common countries of birth were England 4.4%, Italy 2.8%, China 2.1%, India 2.1%, and Lebanon 1.6%. 48.2% of people had both parents born in Australia.
- 80.7% only spoke English at home; other languages spoken at home included Italian 3.4%, Arabic 2.1%, Mandarin 2.1%, Punjabi 1.1%, and Greek 1.0%.
- The median household weekly income was $3,067, compared to the national median of $1,746. The median monthly mortgage repayment was $3,588.
- 88.9% of households were family households, 11.1% were single-person households and 0.0% were group households. The average household size was 3.4 people.
