= Fiddletown, New South Wales =

Fiddletown
- Suburb
- Interactive map of Fiddletown
- Coordinates: 33.60259°S 151.04984°E
- Country: Australia
- State: New South Wales
- City: Sydney
- LGA: Hornsby Shire
- Location: 39 km (24 mi) north-west of Sydney CBD

Government
  - State electorate: Hornsby
  - Federal division: Berowra
- Elevation: 210 m (690 ft)

Population
  - Total: 259 (2021 census)
- Postcode: 2159
Suburbs around Fiddletown
Forest Glen	Canoelands	Canoelands
Glenorie	Fiddletown	Arcadia
Glenorie	Arcadia	Arcadia

Fiddletown is a semi-rural suburb of Sydney, in the state of New South Wales, Australia, 39 kilometres north of the Sydney central business district, in the local government area of Hornsby Shire.

== Landmarks ==
Fiddletown is a quiet rural suburb which features many orchards and rural properties. Fiddletown is home to a telephone exchange and Northholm Grammar School.

== History ==
Fiddletown was named for two brothers named Henstock and another young man named Small, who took up selections in the area. Each had a violin or fiddle. Areas here were mined for sandstone and people who came to work there lived in caravans and grew orange orchards, which can still be found in Marramarra National Park.

In recent years, the Geographical Names Board of New South Wales debated its amalgamation into the adjacent suburb of Arcadia. However, this attempt was unsuccessful.
