= Singletons Mill =

Outer Suburb of Sydney, New South Wales, Australia

- Suburb
- Coordinates: 33°27′54″S 151°04′05″E
- Country: Australia
- State: New South Wales
- City: Sydney
- LGA: Hornsby Shire

Government
  - State electorate: Hornsby
  - Federal division: Berowra

Singletons Mill is a suburb of Sydney, in the state of New South Wales, Australia. It is located in the Hornsby Shire local government area.

The town of Singleton was named after Benjamin Singleton. James and Benjamin had established a flour mill on Wheeny Creek near Kurrajong and later applied for land on the Hawkesbury River to set up a tidal mill, prior to 1820. The mill did very well; by 1834 James had built a larger mill downstream on the southern side. The water-driven wheel was five metres in diameter, and the grinding stones weighed one ton each.
