= Mount Kuring-gai =

- Suburb
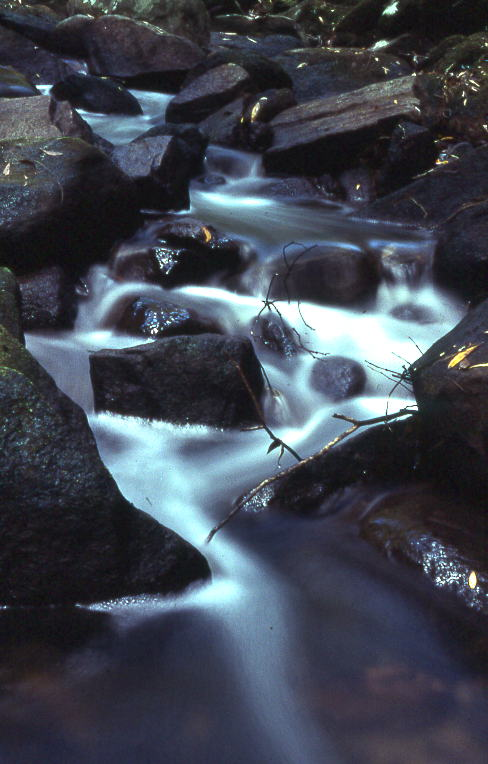
- Cascades along Calna Creek

- Interactive map of Mount Kuring-gai
- Country: Australia
- State: New South Wales
- City: Sydney
- LGA: Hornsby Shire
- Location: 31 km (19 mi) from Sydney CBD

Government
  - State electorate: Hornsby
  - Federal division: Berowra
- Elevation: 210 m (690 ft)

Population
  - Total: 1,766 (2021 census)
- Postcode: 2080
Suburbs around Mount Kuring-gai
| Berrilee | Berowra Heights | Berowra |
| Hornsby Heights | Mount Kuring-gai | Ku-ring-gai Chase National Park |
| Hornsby Heights | Mount Colah | North Turramurra |

Mount Kuring-gai is an outer suburb of Northern Sydney, in the state of New South Wales, Australia. Mount Kuring-gai is located 31 kilometres north-west of the Sydney central business district, in the local government area of Hornsby Shire.

== History ==
The name "Kuring-gai" derives from the Guringai Aboriginal people who were thought to be the traditional owners of the area. More contemporary research suggests that this was not the case.

The railway station opened on 5 October 1901 and was named Kuring-gai. The current station was constructed in 1909. The Mount was added to the name on 1 August 1904.

Kuring-gai Post Office opened on 27 January 1908 and was similarly renamed Mount Kuring-gai in 1933.

== Population ==
In the 2021 Census, there were 1,766 people in Mount Kuring-Gai. 70.9% of people were born in Australia and 80.6% of people spoke only English at home. The most common responses for religion were No Religion 36.9%, Catholic 18.0%, Anglican 14.2% and Hinduism 4.7%.

== Commercial areas and transport ==
The suburb is divided in two by the Pacific Highway, Main Northern railway line and the Pacific Motorway. The suburb is served by the Mount Kuring-gai railway station.

The eastern side is home to a primary school, community hall and sports oval. The western side has a shopping centre, Mount Kuring-gai railway station and a Telstra telephone exchange. The east and west sides are connected by a road bridge and a pedestrian bridge.

In 2010, the existing shopping centre was demolished and an Aldi store was built in its place, along with a variety of other stores.

Mount Kuring-gai also has an industrial area which is home to many diverse businesses such as a hot air balloon manufacturer, electronics companies, a school paint manufacturer, a book publisher and one bus depot of CDC NSW.

== Geography ==
Mount Kuring-gai is located approximately 7 km north of Hornsby. Its neighbouring suburbs are Berowra to the north, and Mount Colah to the south. Surrounded by bushland, it is bordered by Ku-ring-gai Chase National Park on the eastern side and by Berowra Valley Regional Park on the western side. There are several bushwalks starting in the suburb including the Great North Walk and a path to Apple Tree Bay. Mount Kuring-gai varies in altitude from about 57 m to 214–221 m above sea level.

== See also ==
- Dangar Island
- Hawkesbury River Railway Bridge
- Hawkesbury River
- Ku-ring-gai Chase National Park

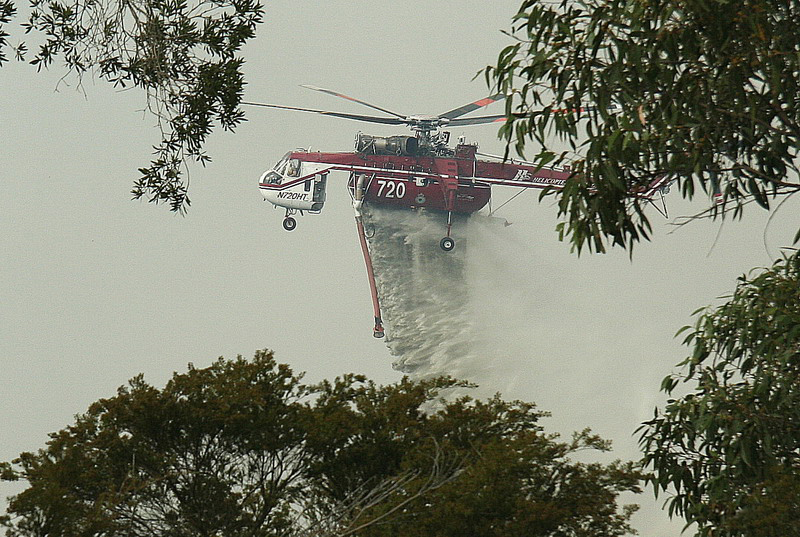
"Shania" (N720HT) dumping water at Mount Kuring-gai in April 2007

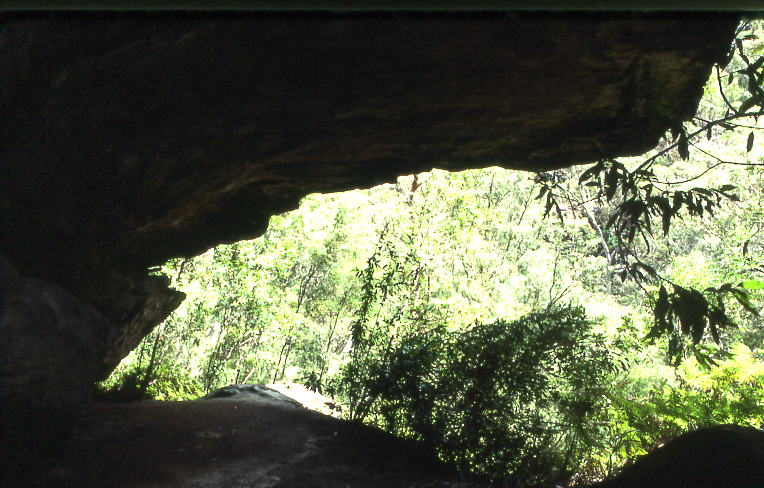
Rock shelter in Lyrebird Gully, where lyrebirds are occasionally seen
