= Division of Berowra =

Australian federal electoral division

Coordinates: 33.568°S 151.047°E

Berowra Australian House of Representatives Division
- Interactive map of electorate boundaries from the 2025 federal election
- Created: 1969
- MP: Julian Leeser
- Party: Liberal
- Namesake: Berowra
- Electors: 130,936 (2025)
- Area: 751 km^{2} (290.0 sq mi)
- Demographic: Outer metropolitan
Electorates around Berowra:
Macquarie	Macquarie	Robertson
Macquarie	Berowra	Mackellar
Greenway; Mitchell	Parramatta; Bennelong	Bradfield

The Division of Berowra (/bəˈraʊrə/) is an Australian electoral division in the state of New South Wales. The seat covers the northern parts of the Greater Sydney area in the local government areas of the Hornsby Shire and the Hills Shire.

It has been continuously held by the Liberal Party since it was first contested in 1969. Its current MP has been Julian Leeser since 2016.

== Geography ==
Berowra covers the northern parts of the Greater Sydney area with the local government areas of the Hornsby Shire and much of the Hills Shire. It also includes small parts of the City of Parramatta and Ku-ring-gai Shire. It includes the suburbs of Annangrove, Arcadia, Asquith, Beecroft, Berowra, Berowra Creek, Berowra Heights, Berowra Waters, Berrilee, Brooklyn, Canoelands, Cheltenham, Cherrybrook, Cowan, Dangar Island, Dural, Epping, Fiddletown, Fishermans Point, Forest Glen, Galston, Glenorie, Hawkesbury River, Hornsby, Hornsby Heights, Kenthurst, Laughtondale, Maroota, Middle Dural, Milsons Passage, Mount Colah, Mount Kuring-gai, Normanhurst, North Epping, Pennant Hills, Round Corner, Sackville North, Singletons Mill, South Maroota, Thornleigh, Waitara, and Westleigh; as well as parts of Castle Hill, Cattai, Glenhaven, Leets Vale, Lower Hawkesbury, Lower Portland, Maraylya, Wahroonga, West Pennant Hills, and Wisemans Ferry.

Since 1984, federal electoral division boundaries in Australia have been determined at redistributions by a redistribution committee appointed by the Australian Electoral Commission. Redistributions occur for the boundaries of divisions in a particular state, and they occur every seven years, or sooner if a state's representation entitlement changes or when divisions of a state are malapportioned.

When the division was created in 1969, it covered areas that were mostly part of the Division of Robertson previously.

== History ==
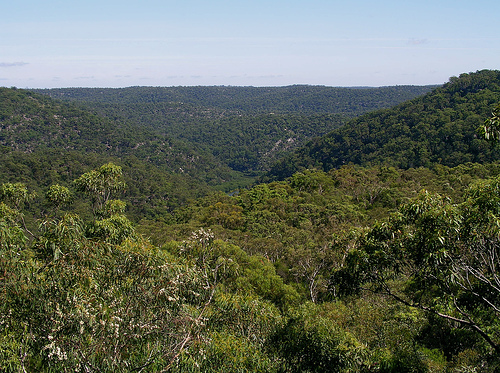
The region of Berowra, the division's namesake

The division was created in 1969 and is named for the area of Berowra. Its boundaries have changed little since it was created and includes the northern parts of the Greater Sydney area in the Hornsby Shire and part of the Hills Shire.

The seat has historically been viewed as a safe seat for the Liberal Party, but became slightly more marginal in 2022. In 2025, the seat became extremely marginal, held on a 1-point margin. The seat is currently held by Liberal Julian Leeser.

== Demographics ==
2021 Australian census
Ancestry
Response	Berowra	NSW	Australia
English	29.9%	29.8%	33.0%
Australian	26.6%	28.0%	29.9%
Chinese	15.0%	7.2%	5.5%
Irish	8.8%	9.1%	9.5%
Scottish	8.3%	7.7%	8.6%
Country of birth
Response	Berowra	NSW	Australia
Australia	62.2%	65.4%	66.9%
China	6.3%	3.1%	2.2%
England	4.0%	2.9%	3.6%
India	3.8%	2.6%	2.6%
Hong Kong	1.7%	0.6%	0.4%
South Korea	1.4%	0.7%	0.4%
Religious affiliation
Response	Berowra	NSW	Australia
No religion	34.4%	32.8%	38.4%
Catholicism	21.9%	22.4%	20.0%
Anglican	13.5%	11.9%	9.8%
Hinduism	4.7%	3.4%	2.7%
Language
Response	Berowra	NSW	Australia
English	66.9%	67.6%	72.0%
Mandarin	7.8%	3.4%	2.7%
Cantonese	3.9%	1.8%	1.2%
Korean	1.8%	0.8%	0.5%
Hindi	1.7%	1.0%	0.8%
Arabic	1.3%	2.8%	1.4%

== Members ==
Image	Member	Party	Term	Notes
	Tom Hughes (1923–2024)	Liberal	25 October 1969 – 2 November 1972	Previously held the Division of Parkes. Served as minister under Gorton and McMahon. Retired
	Harry Edwards (1927–2012)	Liberal	2 December 1972 – 8 February 1993	Retired
	Philip Ruddock (1943–)	Liberal	13 March 1993 – 9 May 2016	Previously held the Division of Dundas. Served as minister under Howard. Served as Chief Government Whip in the House under Abbott. Retired
	Julian Leeser (1976–)	Liberal	2 July 2016 – present	Incumbent

== Election results ==
2025 Australian federal election: Berowra
Party	Candidate	Votes	%	±%
Liberal	Julian Leeser	48,210	41.72	−5.47
Labor	Benson Koschinski	31,220	27.01	+3.19
Greens	Martin Cousins	13,781	11.92	−2.97
Independent	Tina Brown	13,135	11.37	+11.37
One Nation	Gerald Mattinson	4,705	4.07	+1.20
Trumpet of Patriots	Stephen Bastian	2,199	1.90	+1.48
Independent	Roger Woodward	1,236	1.07	+0.34
Fusion	Brendan Clarke	1,082	0.94	−0.45
Total formal votes		115,568	93.61	−0.65
Informal votes		7,892	6.39	+0.65
Turnout		123,460	94.34	+2.03
Two-party-preferred result
Liberal	Julian Leeser	59,673	51.63	−5.93
Labor	Benson Koschinski	55,895	48.37	+5.93
Liberal hold		Swing	−5.93	
