= Cheltenham, New South Wales =

Cheltenham
- Suburb
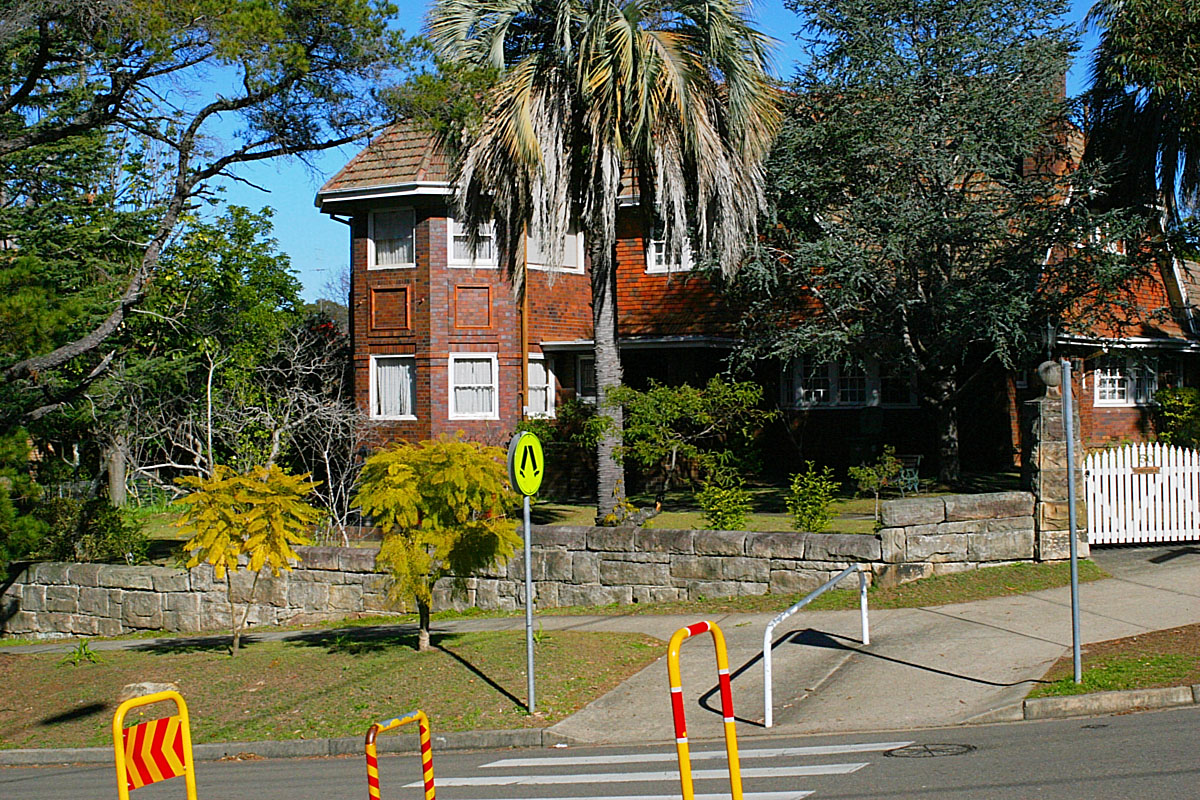
- House opposite Cheltenham Station

- Interactive map of Cheltenham
- Country: Australia
- State: New South Wales
- Region: Northern Suburbs
- City: Sydney
- LGA: Hornsby Shire
- Location: 18 km (11 mi) NW of Sydney CBD

Government
  - State electorate: Epping
  - Federal division: Berowra
- Elevation: 119 m (390 ft)

Population
  - Total: 2,166 (2021 census)
- Postcode: 2119
Suburbs around Cheltenham
Beecroft	Pennant Hills	Pennant Hills
Beecroft	Cheltenham	North Epping
Carlingford	Epping	Epping

Cheltenham is a suburb in the Northern Sydney region of Sydney, in the state of New South Wales, Australia. Cheltenham is 18 kilometres north-west of the Sydney central business district in the local government area of Hornsby Shire.

Cheltenham is a small residential affluent suburb with a distinctive English atmosphere, characterised by a number of 19th century mansions on tree-lined streets. Cheltenham shares its postcode of 2119 with Beecroft and has sometimes been viewed as part of the suburb. Most residents of Cheltenham see themselves as distinct from Beecroft, although local issues are addressed together in the Beecroft Cheltenham Civic Trust.

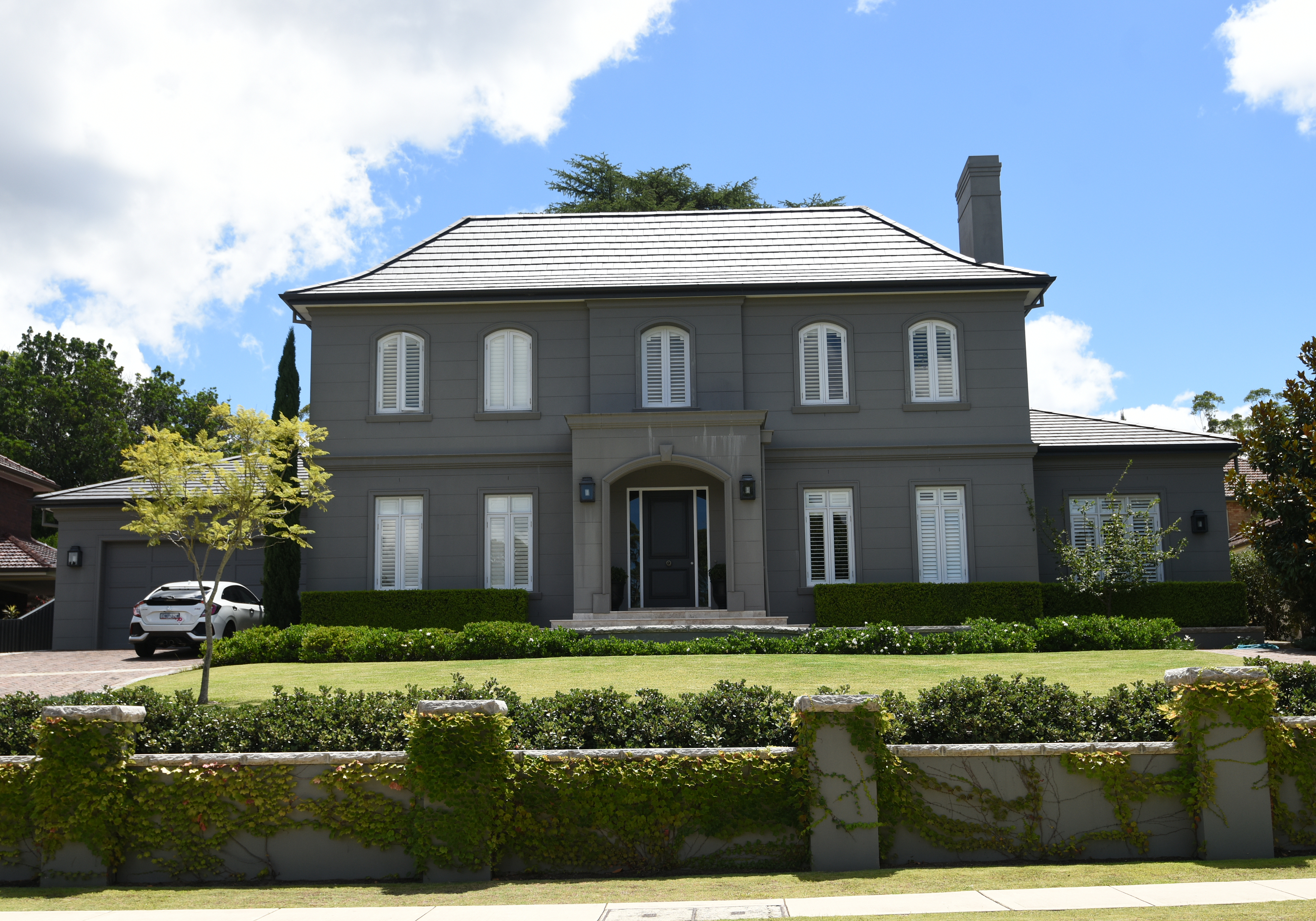
Suburban home in Cheltenham

== History ==
Cheltenham takes its name from a house built by William Chorley, a Sydney tailor and men's outfitter, who acquired the land when it was released from the Field of Mars Reserve. He named the house after his birthplace of Cheltenham, Gloucestershire, England. Chorley asked the government to build a station here and to name it after his property when it opened in 1898. Sutherland Road was named for John Sutherland, Minister for Public Works from 1887 to 1889.

== Beecroft Cheltenham History Group ==
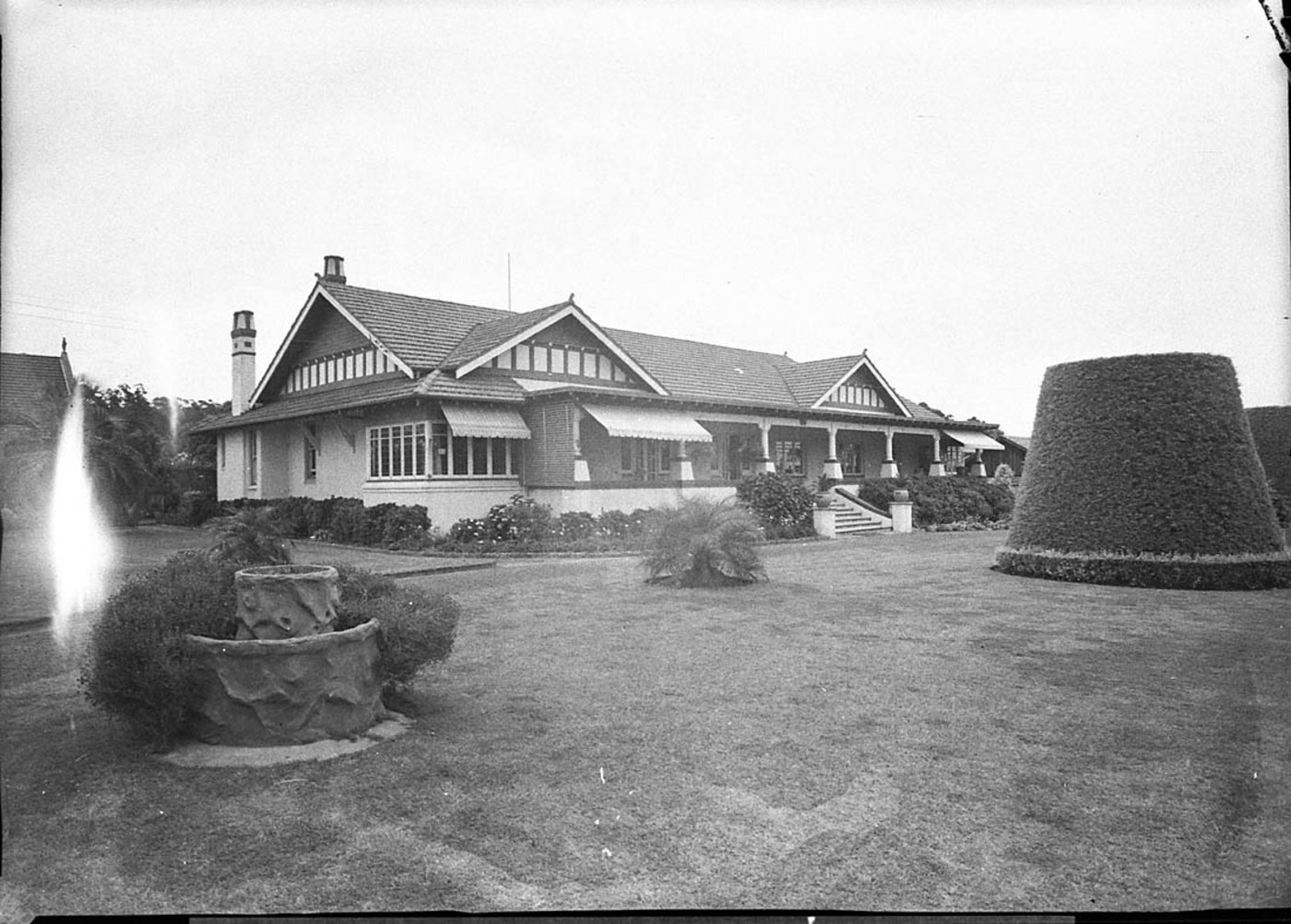
A Sam Hood photo of Mrs Surgeons Cheltenham home in 1941

The Beecroft Cheltenham History Group was founded in 1987 by local history enthusiasts to record the history of Beecroft and Cheltenham and to collect and preserve photos and other historical information relative to the area. Since 2005 it has been part of the Beecroft Cheltenham Civic Trust. In 1995 a book covering the history of Beecroft and Cheltenham up to 1914 was published. In 2004 a book on walks around the district was published. In 2005 a book about the Beecroft Children's Library was published.

== Heritage listings ==
Cheltenham has a number of heritage-listed sites, including Ahimsa at 67 Cobran Road.

== Demographics ==
According to the 2021 census, there were 2,166 residents in Cheltenham. These are sub-divided as follows:

Ethnic diversity
64.2% of people were born in Australia. The next most common country of birth was China at 9.5% followed by Hong Kong with 3.6%, England with 3.0%, India with 2.3%, and Sri Lanka with 1.7%. The most common ancestries in Cheltenham were English 27.2%, Australian 25.5%, Chinese 24.4%, Scottish 12.3% and Irish with 10.3%. 66.1% of people only spoke English at home. Other languages spoken at home included Mandarin 11.4%, Cantonese 7.2%, Tamil 1.4%, Korean 1.4%, Hindi 1.0%.
Age distribution
The median age of people in Cheltenham was 46, compared to the national median of 38. Children aged under 15 made up 16.6% of the population, and people aged 65 and over made up 19.3% of the population.
Income
Cheltenham is a wealthy suburb, with the median weekly household income being $3,573, more than double the national median weekly income of $1,746.
Housing
95.7% of the dwellings in Cheltenham are made up of separate houses.
Religion
The most common responses for religion were No Religion 39.2%, Anglican 15.2%, Catholic 14.1%, Hinduism 4.1% and Buddhism 3.5%.

== Transport ==
Cheltenham railway station is on the Northern Line of the Sydney Trains network. It is one of the few stations with no surrounding business district, due to William Chorley placing covenants on the surrounding land.

The M2 Hills Motorway runs along the southern border of the suburb. For many years, Sutherland Road ran through both Beecroft and Cheltenham, and acted as a shortcut between Beecroft Road and Epping Road. This road ran to the east of the Railway line and, during peak hour, was quite busy. With the opening of the M2 Hills Motorway in 1997, Sutherland Road was closed at the Devlins Creek bridge - where the M2 enters a tunnel under North Epping. The result of this closure is that the areas east of the railway line are now very quiet, and the house values have benefitted.

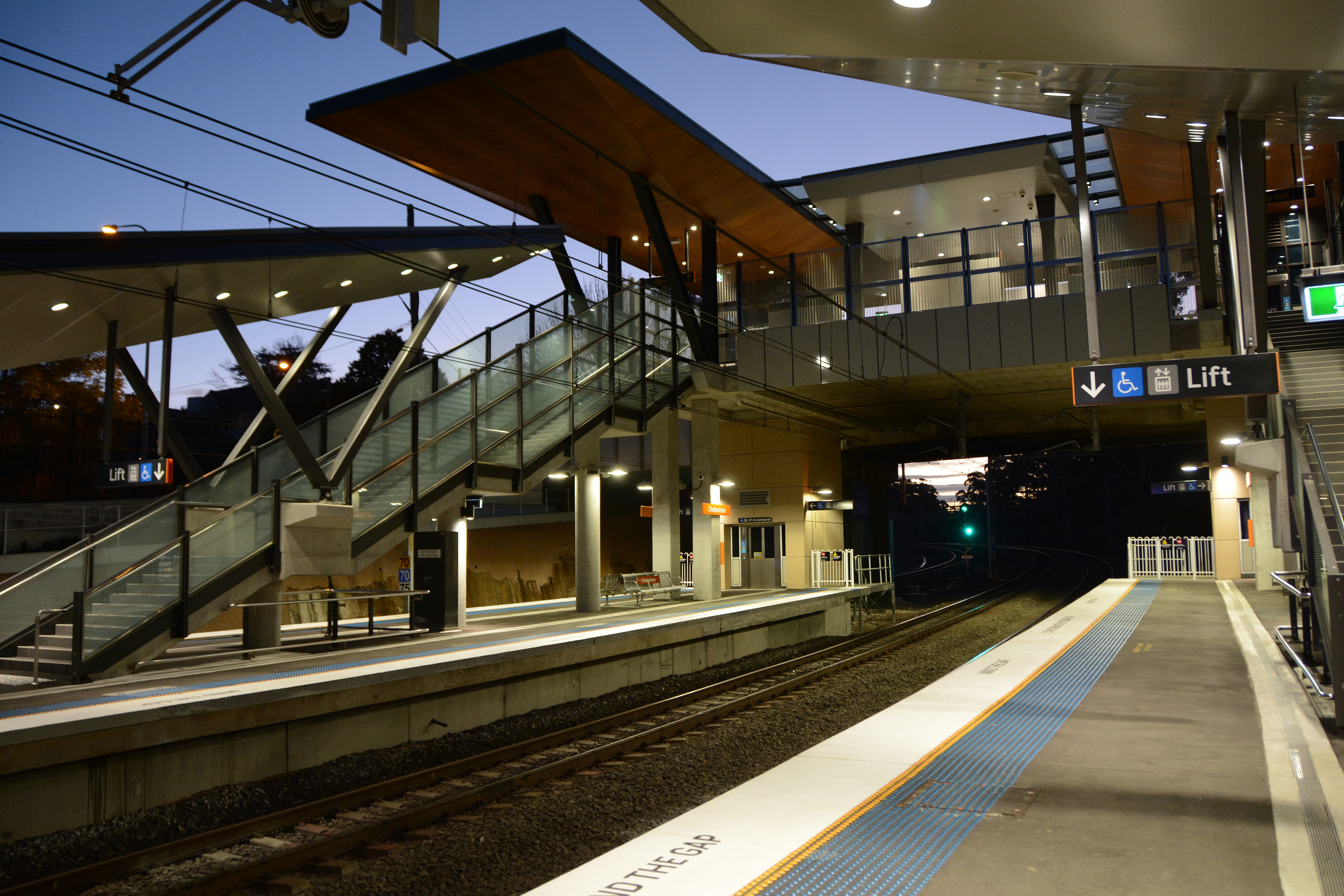
Cheltenham station platforms and bridge

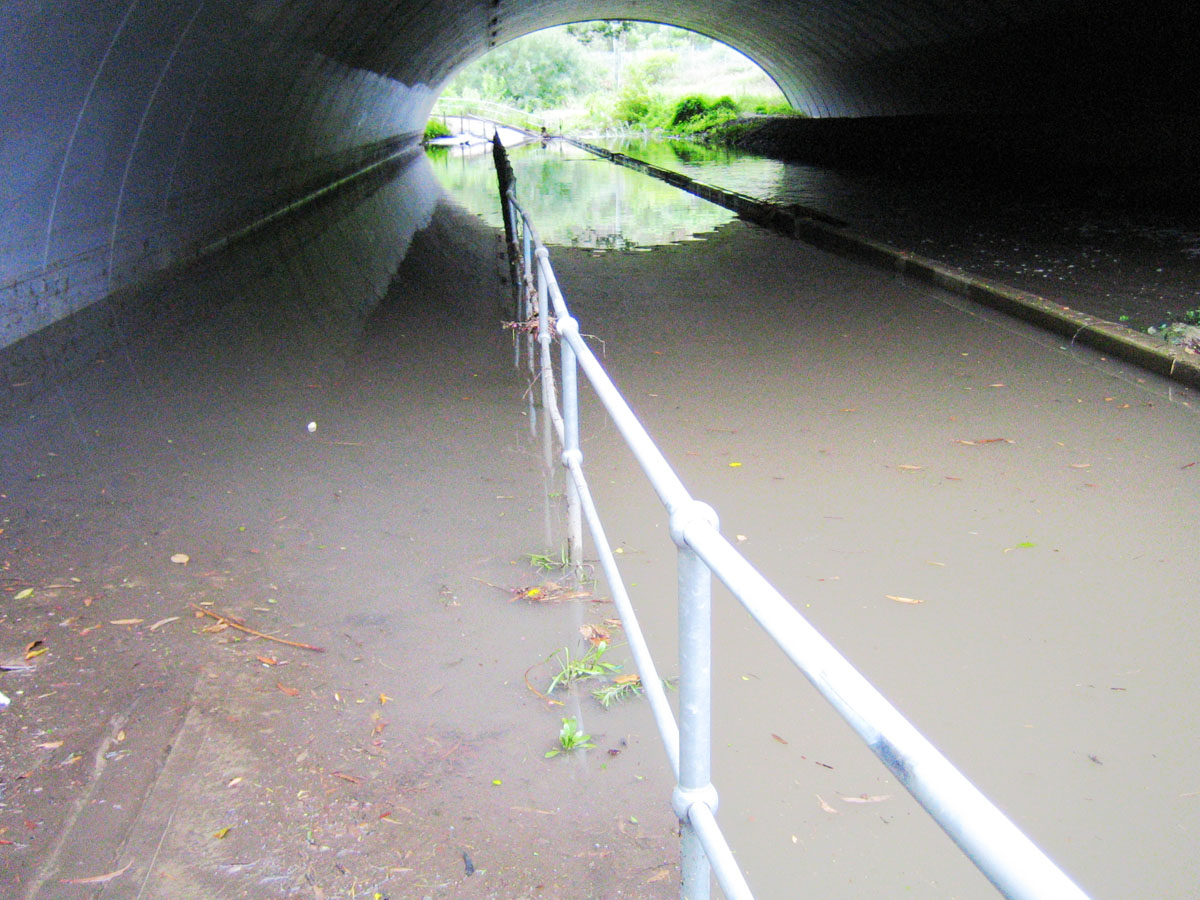
Devlins Creek, in flood under the M2, looking to Sutherland Road

== Schools ==
Cheltenham Girls' High School, a government school, is located along Beecroft Road and The Promenade. Beecroft Public School and Arden Anglican School are primary schools in nearby Beecroft.

== Commercial area ==
From its early days, Cheltenham was almost exclusively a residential suburb with no shopping area developed at all in its planning. Residents of Cheltenham often shop in Beecroft, Pennant Hills or Epping. The nearest shopping mall is in Carlingford.

== Ahimsa ==
Ahimsa (an Indian word meaning non-violence) is the name of a bush retreat located in Cobran Road. It was originally the home of the environmentalist Marie Byles, who died in the house in 1979. It can be accessed at the rear of Day Road and Cobran Road (both roads are cul-de-sacs). The site is administered by the National Trust of Australia. The house is leased privately but the bush area is open to the public within certain restrictions.
