= Leets Vale, New South Wales =

Leets Vale Sydney, New South Wales
- Coordinates: 33°25′55″S 150°57′4″E
- Population: 59 (2021 census)
- Postcode(s): 2775
- Elevation: 22 m (72 ft)
- Location: 83 km (52 mi) from Sydney CBD
- LGA(s): The Hills Shire
- State electorate(s): Hawkesbury
- Federal division(s): Macquarie; Berowra
Suburbs around Leets Vale:
Webbs Creek	Webbs Creek	Wisemans Ferry
Webbs Creek	Leets Vale	Laughtondale
Cumberland Reach	Maroota	Laughtondale

Leets Vale is a village near Sydney, in the state of New South Wales, Australia. It is 83 kilometres north-west of the Sydney central business district, in the local government area of The Hills Shire. The Hawkesbury River flows through the locality.

The area is scarcely populated and is not linked by any public transport. It is only accessible by road.
