= Laughtondale =

- Suburb
- Interactive map of Laughtondale
- Coordinates: 33°25′48″S 151°1′44″E
- Country: Australia
- State: New South Wales
- City: Sydney
- LGA: Hornsby Shire
- Location: 79 km (49 mi) from Sydney CBD

Government
  - State electorate: Hornsby
  - Federal division: Berowra
- Elevation: 14 m (46 ft)

Population
  - Total: 102 (2021 census)
- Postcode: 2775
- Parish: Frederick
Suburbs around Laughtondale
Wisemans Ferry	Gunderman	Gunderman
Maroota	Laughtondale	Gunderman
Maroota	Canoelands	Spencer

Laughtondale is a suburb of Sydney, in the state of New South Wales, Australia. It is located in the Hornsby Shire local government area.

== History ==
Laughtondale Post Office opened on 26 November 1910 and closed in 1966.

== See also ==
- Hawkesbury River
