= Arcadia, New South Wales =

Arcadia
- Suburb
- Interactive map of Arcadia
- Country: Australia
- State: New South Wales
- City: Sydney
- LGA: Hornsby Shire
- Location: 42 km (26 mi) north-west of Sydney CBD

Government
  - State electorate: Hornsby
  - Federal division: Berowra
- Elevation: 218 m (715 ft)

Population
  - Total: 1,475 (2021 census)
- Postcode: 2159
Suburbs around Arcadia
Glenorie	Fiddletown	Berrilee
Glenorie	Arcadia	Berrilee
Galston	Galston	Berrilee

Arcadia is a semi-rural suburb of Sydney, in the state of New South Wales, Australia 42 kilometres north-west of the Sydney central business district in the local government area of Hornsby Shire.

== History ==
Arcadia is derived from Arcadia, a region in Greece and in Greek mythology was a pastoral retreat.

Arcadia Post Office opened on 1 December 1895 (renamed from an earlier Upper Galston office) and closed in 1974.

=== Aboriginal culture ===
The original inhabitants of the area were the Darug people.

=== European settlement ===
The name Dooral appeared on Surveyor James Meehan's map of April 1817 and originally covered the whole area which includes present day Arcadia, as well as Dural, Glenorie and Galston.

Timber cutters opened up the area from 1817 and the early settlements were originally known as Upper, Middle, Lower, North and Little Dural. The name Arcadia was given to a public school that opened in this area in 1895 and was later adopted for the suburb.

== Demographics ==
According to the 2021 census of Population, there were 1,475 residents in Arcadia. 79.6% of residents were born in Australia. The most common other countries of birth were England (4.8%), New Zealand (2.0%), South Africa (1.0%), Scotland (0.9%) and China (0.9%). 88.1% of residents spoke only English at home. Other languages spoken at home included Italian (1.3%), Arabic (0.9%), Mandarin (0.9%), German (0.5%) and Croatian (0.4%). The most common responses for religious affiliation were No Religion, so described (33.3%), Catholic (27.0%) and Anglican (17.5%).

== Transport ==
Arcadia Road is the main road through the suburb that provides access from Galston and leads north into Bay Road to Berrilee and Berowra Waters. Arcadia Road also links to Cobah Road which leads north to Fiddletown.

== Landmarks ==
- St Benedict's Monastery
- St Columb's Anglican Church
- Arcadia Public School
- Arcadia Park – Arcadia Rural Fire Service is located here
- Arcadia Community Hall

== Schools ==
Arcadia Public School is the local primary school in Arcadia, catering for children from Kindergarten to Year 6.

A website and a book on the history of Arcadia the suburb and Arcadia Public School was created in 2014 as part of the Arcadia Public School 120th celebrations. The 120th Anniversary committee were the recipients of the 2015 Owen Nannelli Memorial Award presented by Hornsby Shire Council.

Northholm Grammar School uses an Arcadia address. Northholm is a private school catering for Kindergarten to Year 12.

== In the media ==
Arcadia Road and houses on Roscommon Road were featured in the Australian movie Tomorrow, When The War Began.
