= Hornsby Shire =

- Local government area
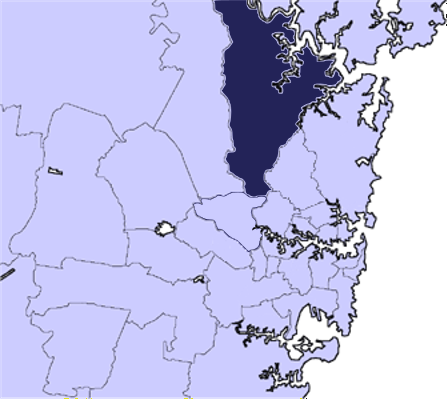
- Location in Metropolitan Sydney

- Interactive map of Hornsby Shire
- Coordinates: 33.7°S 151.1°E
- Country: Australia
- State: New South Wales
- Region: Northern Sydney; Upper North Shore (Parts)
- Established: 6 March 1906
- Council seat: Hornsby

Government
  - Mayor: Warren Waddell (Liberal)
  - State electorates: Castle Hill; Epping; Hornsby; Wahroonga
  - Federal division: Berowra

Area
  - Total: 455 km^{2} (176 sq mi)

Population
  - Total: 151,811 (2021 census)
  - Density: 333.7/km^{2} (864.2/sq mi)
- Website: Hornsby Shire
LGAs around Hornsby Shire
The Hills	Central Coast	Central Coast
The Hills	Hornsby Shire	Northern Beaches
Parramatta	Ryde	Ku-ring-gai

Hornsby Shire is a local government area situated on the Upper North Shore as well as parts of the Hills District, of Sydney in the state of New South Wales, Australia. The shire stretches from the M2 Hills Motorway in the south to the Hawkesbury River town of Wisemans Ferry, some 53 kilometres (33 mi) to the north, making it the largest local government council in the Greater Sydney Metropolitan region by total area. As of the 2016 census the shire had an estimated population of 142,667.

The mayor of Hornsby Shire is Cr Warren Waddell, a member of the Liberal Party, who was elected on 14 September 2024.

== Suburbs and localities in the local government area ==
Suburbs in the Hornsby Shire include:

- Arcadia
- Asquith
- Beecroft (shared with City of Parramatta)
- Berowra
- Berowra Heights
- Berrilee
- Bobbin Head
- Brooklyn
- Canoelands (shared with The Hills Shire)
- Castle Hill (shared with The Hills Shire)
- Cheltenham
- Cherrybrook
- Cowan
- Dangar Island
- Dural (shared with The Hills Shire)
- Fiddletown
- Forest Glen
- Galston
- Glenhaven (shared with The Hills Shire)
- Glenorie (shared with The Hills Shire)
- Hornsby
- Hornsby Heights
- Laughtondale
- Maroota (shared with The Hills Shire)
- Middle Dural (shared with The Hills Shire)
- Milsons Passage
- Mount Colah
- Mount Kuring-gai
- Normanhurst
- North Epping
- Pennant Hills
- Rogans Hill
- Round Corner
- Singletons Mill
- Thompsons Corner
- Thornleigh
- Wahroonga (shared with Ku-ring-gai Council)
- Waitara
- West Pennant Hills (shared with The Hills Shire)
- Westleigh
- Wisemans Ferry (shared with Central Coast Council, City of Hawkesbury and The Hills Shire)

== Demographics ==
At the 2016 census, there were 142,667 people in the Hornsby local government area, of these 48.8 per cent were male and 51.2 per cent were female. Aboriginal and Torres Strait Islander people made up 0.5 per cent of the population; significantly below the NSW and Australian averages of 2.9 and 2.8 per cent respectively. The median age of people in the Hornsby Shire was 40 years; slightly higher than the national median of 38 years. Children aged 0 – 14 years made up 19.5 per cent of the population and people aged 65 years and over made up 16.2 per cent of the population. Of people in the area aged 15 years and over, 58.8 per cent were married and 8.2 per cent were either divorced or separated.

Population growth in the Hornsby Shire between the 2001 census and the 2006 census was 4.58 per cent and in the subsequent five years to the 2011 census, population growth was 3.65 per cent. At the 2016 census, the population in the Shire decreased by 9.04 per cent brought about predominately by an adjustment in local government boundaries. The median weekly income for residents within the Hornsby Shire was higher than the national average. As of the 2021 Census, reflecting a national change in opinion towards religion, the amount of non-religious people increased to 36.0% from 28.9% recorded at the previous Census in 2016.

Selected historical census data for Hornsby local government area
Census year		2001	2006	2011	2016	2021
Population	Estimated residents on census night	144,692	151,325	156,847	142,667	151,811
Population	LGA rank in terms of size within New South Wales			16th	▼20th	
Population	% of New South Wales population			2.27%	▼1.91%	
Population	% of Australian population	0.77%	▼0.76%	▼0.73%	▼0.61%	
Cultural and language diversity						
Ancestry, top responses	English			23.5%	▼22.8%	▲27.6%
Ancestry, top responses	Australian			22.4%	▼19.7%	▲24.4%
Ancestry, top responses	Chinese			9.8%	▲10.6%	▲16.8%
Ancestry, top responses	Irish			7.1%	▲7.3%	▲7.8%
Ancestry, top responses	Scottish			6.3%	▼6.2%	▲7.8%
Language, top responses (other than English)	Mandarin	2.0%	▲3.5%	▲4.9%	▲7.2%	▲9.2%
Language, top responses (other than English)	Cantonese	4.6%	▲5.1%	▲5.2%	▼4.0%	▲4.1%
Language, top responses (other than English)	Korean	1.6%	▲2.1%	▲2.7%	▼2.3%	2.3%
Language, top responses (other than English)	Hindi	0.7%	▲1.1%	▲1.5%	▲1.6%	▲2.2%
Language, top responses (other than English)	Persian (excluding Dari)	n/c	n/c	n/c	▲1.2%	▲1.4%
Religious affiliation						
Religious affiliation, top responses	No religion, so described	14.0%	▲17.1%	▲21.9%	▲28.9%	▲36.0%
Religious affiliation, top responses	Catholic	24.6%	▼24.3%	▼23.6%	▼21.4%	▼19.2%
Religious affiliation, top responses	Anglican	23.4%	▼21.3%	▼19.0%	▼15.5%	▼12.2%
Religious affiliation, top responses	Not stated	n/c	n/c	n/c	▲7.3%	▼4.2%
Religious affiliation, top responses	Hinduism	1.8%	▲2.5%	▲3.5%	▲4.6%	▲6.7%
Median weekly incomes						
Personal income	Median weekly personal income		$580	▲$682	▲$793	▲$958
Personal income	% of Australian median income		124.5%	▼118.2%	▲119.8%	
Family income	Median weekly family income		$1,514	▲$2,119	▲$2,372	▲$2,825
Family income	% of Australian median income		147.4%	▼143.1%	▼136.8%	
Household income	Median weekly household income		$1,763	▲$1,824	▲$2,121	▲$2,417
Household income	% of Australian median income		150.5%	▼147.8%	▼147.5%	

== Council ==
=== Current composition and election method ===
A map of the three wards, showing party representation as of the 2021 local elections

Hornsby Shire Council is composed of ten councillors, including the mayor, for a fixed four-year term of office. The mayor is directly elected while the nine other councillors are elected proportionally as three separate wards, each electing three councillors. The most recent election was held on 4 December 2021, and the makeup of the council, including the mayor, is as follows:

Party	Councillors
Liberal	5
Greens	2
Labor	2
Independent	1
Total	10

The current Council, elected in 2024, in order of election by ward, is:

Ward	Councillor	Party	Notes
Mayor	Warren Waddell	Liberal	
A Ward	Jane Seaglove	Liberal	
A Ward	Nathan Tilbury	Independent	Resigned from Liberal Party in 2024
A Ward	Olivia Simons	Greens	
B Ward	Janelle McIntosh	Labor	
B Ward	Sallianne McClelland	Liberal	
B Ward	Monika Ball	Greens	
C Ward	Verity Greenwood	Liberal	
C Ward	Ben McSweeney	Liberal	
C Ward	Matthew Conley	Labor	

== Election results ==
=== 2024 ===
2024 New South Wales local elections: Hornsby
Party	Votes	%	Swing	Seats	Change
Liberal	36,720	44.0	−6.2	4	▼2
Greens	18,128	21.7	−6.4	2	▼1
Labor	15,638	18.8	+5.8	2	▲2
Independents	12,876	15.4	+7.6	1	▲1
Formal votes	83,362	92.9			
Informal votes	6,339	7.1			
Total	89,701			9	
Registered voters / turnout					

=== 2021 ===
2021 New South Wales local elections: Hornsby
Party	Votes	%	Swing	Seats	Change
Liberal	42,748	50.2	+6.3	6	▲4
Greens	23,904	28.1	+9.1	3	▲1
Labor	11,755	13.0	−3.8	0	▼2
Independent	6,664	7.8	−12.3	0	▼1
Formal votes	85,071	96.89			
Informal votes	2,732	3.11			
Total	87,803	100.00			

== History ==
Hornsby Shire is the traditional lands occupied by the Darug and Kuringgai peoples of indigenous Australians. While the northern part of the Shire via the Hawkesbury River was visited by the first European settlers in late 1788, due to the Shire's rugged landscape permanent European settlement did not begin until almost half a century later.

Hornsby Shire got its name from the town of Hornsby at the eastern end of the Shire, is derived from convict-turned-Constable Samuel Horne, who earned distinction by capturing bushrangers Dalton and MacNamara on 22 June 1830. In return he was granted land in the locality known as "Hornsby Place".

Hornsby Shire has remained largely rural for many decades. The construction of the Main North railway line in the 1880s opened up the Shire to the rest of Sydney and also to Newcastle, but it was not until motor vehicles became commonplace in the 1950s that the southern part of the Shire truly became part of Sydney's suburbia. The Shire was incorporated as a local government authority on 6 March 1906.

A 2015 review of local government boundaries by the NSW Government Independent Pricing and Regulatory Tribunal recommended that Hornsby Shire merge with adjoining councils. The government considered two proposals. The first proposed a merger of part of Hornsby with the Ku-ring-gai Council to form a new council with an area of 540 square kilometres (210 sq mi) and support a population of approximately 270,000. The second proposed a merger of parts of Parramatta, Auburn, The Hills, Hornsby, and Holroyd to form a new council with an area of 82 square kilometres (32 sq mi) and support a population of approximately 215,725. The outcome of the review was that the suburbs of Hornsby Shire Council south of the M2 joined an expanded Parramatta City Council. The NSW Government also gave in principle support for the Hornsby Shire suburbs north of the M2 to amalgamate with Ku-ring-gai Council. In July 2017, the Berejiklian government decided to abandon the forced merger of the Hornsby and Ku-ring-gai local government areas, along with several other proposed forced mergers. This failed merger resulted in the council losing lucrative area south of the M2 including Epping and Carlingford.

== Heritage listings ==
The Hornsby Shire has a number of heritage-listed sites, including:

- Brooklyn, Main Northern railway: Hawkesbury River railway station
- Cheltenham, 67 Cobran Road: Ahimsa, Cheltenham
- Galston, 161 Main Road: Tunks Creek Bridge
- Galston, 11 School Road: Galston Congregational Church Pipe Organ
- Hornsby, 2a Manor Road (Rosamond Street): Mount Wilga House
- Hornsby, Old Man's Valley, off Quarry Road: Old Man's Valley Cemetery
- Normanhurst, 82-84 Pennant Hills Road: Gilligaloola
- Wahroonga, 9 Highlands Avenue: Highlands

== Geography ==
Hornsby calls itself the 'Bushland Shire'. This is in reference to its location on a high ridge separating two expansive areas of natural bushland which consists of up to 70% of the total area: The Ku-ring-gai Chase National Park on the eastern side and the Berowra Valley Regional Park on the western side. These provide large areas of natural parkland that form a green belt running from Sydney at the south to the Hawkesbury River at the Shire's northern end. These parks are extremely popular with day-trippers from all areas of Sydney and provides diverse recreations such as bushwalking and boating.

The northern half of Hornsby Shire remains a semi-rural area, retaining a number of farmlands and market gardens. This area consists of small village settlements such as Mount Colah and Hornsby Heights. The village of Galston is the centre of this rural area.

The western part of the shire shares a 53-kilometre (33 mi) border with The Hills Shire and is separated from the rest of the Shire by national parks and the Galston Gorge.

The southern half of the Shire is urban, forming part of Sydney's suburbia on the North Shore and Northern Suburbs. Traditionally most of the Shire's residents live in free-standing houses, but in recent years a number of semi-detached housings as well as high-density apartments have appeared around Hornsby's central business district.

The Shire has several areas with industrial activity including Hornsby, Asquith and Thornleigh. The major commercial centres of the Shire, apart from Hornsby's central business district, are the suburbs of Pennant Hills and North Epping.

Local attractions in the Hornsby Shire include its easily accessible wilderness areas including part of the Great North Walk, parkland recreational facilities such as Fagan Park at Galston, Pennant Hills Park, Koala Park Sanctuary in West Pennant Hills, and the village of Brooklyn on the Hawkesbury River.

Hornsby Shire has four public libraries (at Hornsby, Pennant Hills, Berowra and Galston, two public swimming pools ("aquatic centres"), and a range of other sporting and community facilities.

== Sports ==
The most popular sport in the Hornsby Shire is Rugby Union, and the main team in the area is the Hornsby Rugby Club, who play at Mark Taylor Oval in Waitara. Hornsby Shire is home to Barker College, a traditional Rugby Union school

Although Hornsby Shire isn't specifically represented by a Rugby League Team, due to geographical Junior Districts, Hornsby Shire is represented in Rugby League by the North Sydney Bears. The North Sydney District Rugby League Football Club, as they are officially known by, are the only team without NRL representation to have a Junior Rugby League District, and teams in the District compete in a Joint District with the Manly, Pittwater and Warringah districts, and clubs are identified with either the Bears or Sea Eagles by which teams logo is on their jersey, with Manly, Pittwater and Warringah districts affiliated with Manly, and teams in the North Sydney district affiliated with the Bears. With 4, Hornsby Shire is home to half of the Junior Rugby League teams in the North Sydney District, the Asquith Magpies, the Berowra Wallabies, the Northwest Hawks (Based in Dural) and the Pennant Hills-Cherrybrook Stags

== See also ==
- Local government areas of New South Wales
