= Ahimsa, Cheltenham =

Heritage-listed residence in Sydney, Australia

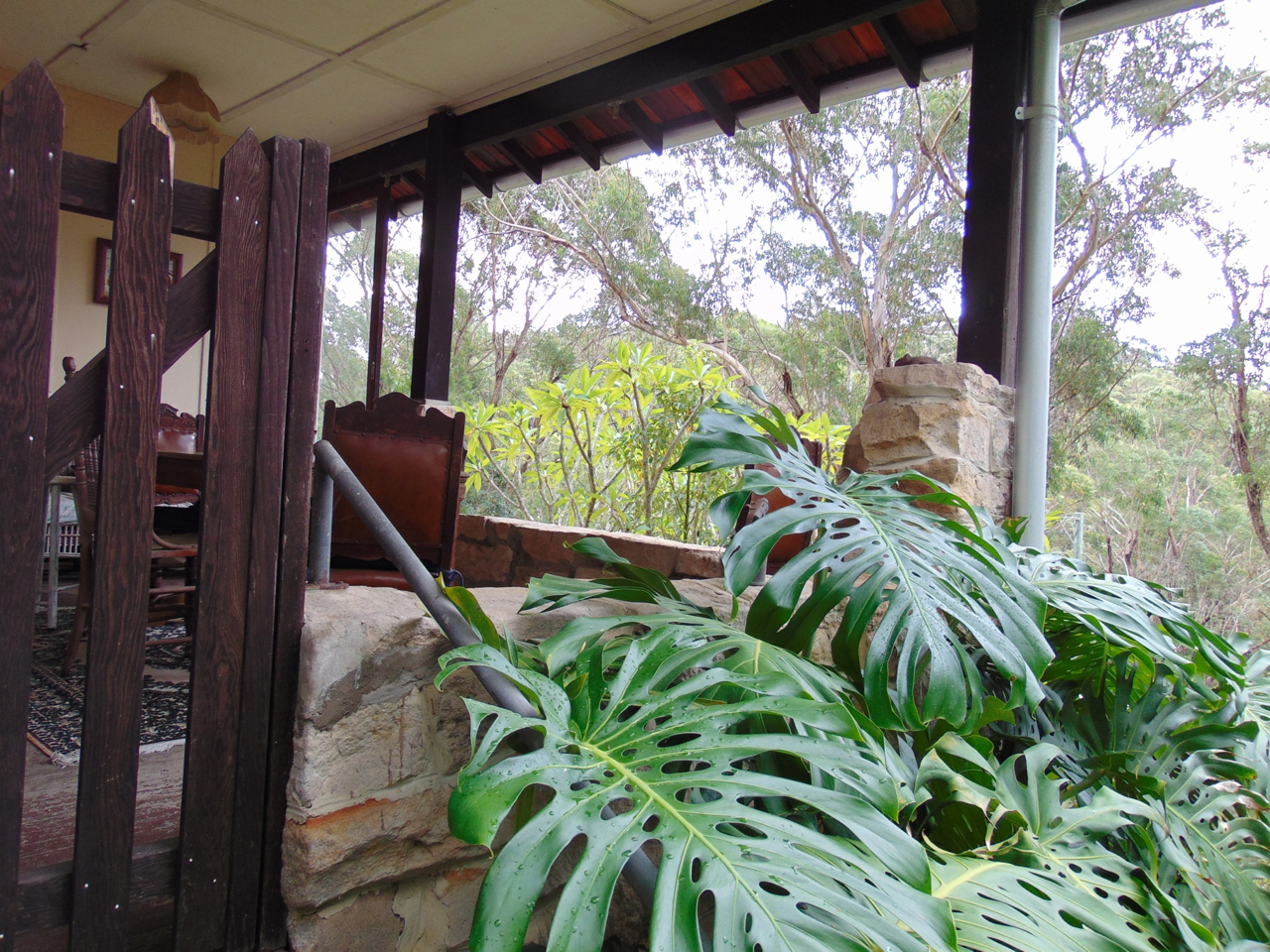
- Verandah of Ahimsa, March 2015

- Location within Sydney Location within Australia
- 33°45′08″S 151°05′03″E
- Location: 67 Cobran Road, Cheltenham, Hornsby Shire, New South Wales, Australia

History
- Built: 1937

Site notes
- Area: 3.5 acres (1.4 ha)
- Architect: Marie Byles
- Owner: National Trust of Australia (NSW)

New South Wales Heritage Register
- Official name: Ahimsa; Ahimsa; The Hut of Happy Omen; Sentosa
- Type: State heritage (landscape)
- Designated: 1 March 2002
- Reference no.: 01494
- Type: Historic Landscape
- Category: Landscape - Cultural
- Builders: Marie Byles

Ahimsa is a heritage-listed residence and meditation meeting place located at 67 Cobran Road, Cheltenham, New South Wales, a suburb of Sydney in Australia. It was designed by and built by Marie Byles during 1937. It is also known as Ahimsa, The Hut of Happy Omen and Sentosa. The property is owned by the National Trust of Australia (NSW). It was added to the New South Wales State Heritage Register on 1 March 2002.

== History ==
In 1935 Marie Beuzeville Byles purchased 1.4 hectares (3.5 acres) of land on the outskirts of Cheltenham. A few years later she designed and built a small one-bedroom house. Perched on a large rock and built of unpainted fibro, oiled timber, random rubble and with a roof glazed terracotta the structure melds well with its bushland setting. Except for a vegetable garden near the house, the remainder of the site was left in its native state.

Marie Byles shared with Walter Burley Griffin and his business partner and fellow architect, Eric Nicholls the objective of integrating structures with the natural landscape and vegetation. Although there is no documented record to prove that Griffin's work influenced her, it seems highly likely that she was favorably impressed by the houses he designed for her friends and sought to incorporate some of their qualities into Ahimsa.

Marie Byles was not an architect and, not surprisingly, her work as a designer is less accomplished than Griffin's. Some specific differences are that he preferred flat roofs while her house has a more conventional terracotta pitched roof; Griffin experimented with prefabricated building materials where as Marie used fibro (even in the 1930s this was a very conventional material); but they shared the goal of building small scale, understated and low cost houses which fitted unobtrusively into the Australian bush.

Born in England in 1900, Byles studied law at The University of Sydney graduating in 1924 to become the first woman in NSW to practice as a solicitor. She was a remarkable woman who was passionately involved in preserving wilderness areas. She was a keen mountaineer and travelled to Norway, China, Canada and New Zealand in search of unclimbed peaks. In 1938 she led an all women team in an attempt to scale a 6,100-metre (20,000 ft) peak, Mount Sansate in Western China. The expedition failed due to adverse weather conditions. In Australia her determined, active nature led her to become an early lobbyist for what we now know as national parks.

Byles was one of the early members of The Sydney Bushwalker's Club and was responsible for drawing the attention of the NSW Lands Department to the wilderness area around Maitland Bay on the central coast north of Sydney. She was appointed Trustee of Bouddi National Park and organised working bees amongst the bushwalkers to maintain the area.

The Beecroft-Cheltenham Civic Trust was established by her as a "non-progress association" which worked for the closure of roads in the area and the planting of native trees and shrubs. She worked with the Bradley sisters (Joan and Eileen) to rid the bush of weeds around her property, and practiced organic gardening techniques all her life. She always slept outside on an open verandah, never drove a car, and walked everywhere, usually with a rucksack.

In 1941 while on a bushwalk, where one of the members was taken ill, Byles shouldered his pack, his carriers and her own, and in consequence her feet were permanently damaged. From that time onwards she could manage short bushwalks only, and mountain climbing became impossible. Always interested in eastern religions, in particular the ideas of Gandhi, her disability gave her more time to research and write. In the late 1940s she took up meditation and later traveled to India and Burma to undergo instruction. In the 1950s Byles built a hut in her garden called the Hut of Happy Omen, which she made available to meditation groups. By this time she had adopted the most ascetic form of South East Asian Buddhism.

The name Ahimsa is derived from Gandhi's teachings and means peace or non-violence.

One night in 1966, while sleeping on her open verandah Byles was physically assaulted and sustained serious injuries including a fractured skull. She declined to charge her assailant. After a period of convalescence she returned to live alone on the estate still sleeping out in the open air. Miss Byles gave up her legal practice in 1970, four years after the attack.

In 1970 Miss Byles gave the property to the National Trust of Australia, remaining in residence as Honorary Curator. Concerned that the one-bedroom house might be too small for her successor, she developed a plan for an addition comprising a one room detached pavilion.

Marie Byles died at Ahimsa on 21 November 1979.

== Description ==
Ahimsa has an area of 1.348 hectares (3.33 acres) and is contiguous with a much larger area of bushland, Pennant Hills Park, to the north. The vegetation is described as dry sclerophyll (hard leafed) bushland on Sydney sandstone and is typical of the flora associated with the Northern Hills District of Sydney.

The northwest, northeast and part of the southeast boundaries are delimited by unmade road reserves, Malton Road (part) and Lyne Road (also known as Cobram Road). It is located on a small ridge, formerly and unofficially called Native Rose Ridge, on the inside of a sharp curve in a creek draining the Beecroft Cheltenham area. This creek subsequently joins Devlins Creek. The upper parts of Ahimsa are relatively flat but the groundslopes off in a series of small Hawkesbury Sandstone cliffs in a north by north-west direction to the fire trail and towards Pennant Hills Park. There are many flat sandstone outcrops and small cliffs.

Buildings

The buildings include Ahimsa, The Hut of Happy Omen, the toilets, which were all built before the land was sold to the Trust, Sentosa, a detached bedsitter which was approved in principle in November 1975. A carport was built onto The Hut in 1977. Ahimsa is a small one-bedroom house built of unpainted fibro, oiled timber and random rubble with a pitched roof of glazed terracotta. There is a brick fireplace in the living room and a large north-facing open verandah looking over the gully. The Hut of Happy Omen is basically an open shed built of unpainted fibro with a roof of corrugated fibro. At some time it has been extended to incorporate a kitchenette and a shower stall. Sentosa is an open plan bedsitter also constructed of fibro with a skillion roof of corrugated fibro.

Marie Byles' design principles are best expressed in this quotation from her: 'No Painting whatever anywhere - Any woodwork to be treated with linseed raw oil (saves unkeep): External walls are to be fibro; Corrugated (sic) fibro (long experience has shown fiber to be lasting, with no upkeep).'

Paths were made by volunteers and Marie Byles' bushwalking friends.

=== Condition ===
As of 27 June 2000, the physical condition was good.

=== Modifications and dates ===
An absorption trench was constructed in 1975 to contain surface run off from properties adjacent to Ahimsa as the Trust was afraid that excessive run off would encourage weed growth.

One cave has been altered and an attractive two-metre high Hawkesbury Sandstone retaining wall was constructed many years ago near the path from the northern gate.

Despite her wish that no plants foreign to it, even from other parts of Australia, should be planted several native plants not indigenous to Ahimsa have been planted.

== Heritage listing ==
As at 27 January 2010, Ahimsa and surrounding landscape stand as a testimony to Marie Byles' life and vision as a feminist and a conservationist. These subjects are of increasing interest to contemporary Australians and are helping to share our culture. Aesthetically, the small scale understated buildings fit unobtrusively into the Australian bushland. The peaceful atmosphere of the property gives visitors an insight into the character of the woman who gave the property to the National Trust. The bushland and topographical features, and the property's close proximity to the state reserve next door, form an intact natural area indicative of the appearance of this area prior to human occupation.

Ahimsa was listed on the New South Wales State Heritage Register on 1 March 2002 having satisfied the following criteria.

The place is important in demonstrating the course, or pattern, of cultural or natural history in New South Wales.

The history of the property is very much the culmination of the ideology practiced by Marie Byles. Marie Byles has been one of the foremost protagonists of national parks as a mechanism to conserve nature. She was one of the early members of Sydney Bushwalkers' Club joining it in 1929 being a keen bushwalker. She was also the first woman lawyer in Australia, which gave her a certain amount of confidence. This confidence coupled with her interest and dedication to the cause of nature conservation became an asset to the nature conservation lobby in Australia. The creation of the Bouddi National Park is identified as a result of the unrelenting efforts by Marie Byles.

The place is important in demonstrating aesthetic characteristics and/or a high degree of creative or technical achievement in New South Wales.

The small scale understated buildings fit unobtrusively into the Australian bushland. The peaceful atmosphere of the property gives the visitors an insight into the character of the woman who gave the property to the National Trust. The bushland and topographical features, and the property's close proximity with the state reserve next door form an intact natural area indicative of the appearance of this area prior to human occupation.

The place has a strong or special association with a particular community or cultural group in New South Wales for social, cultural or spiritual reasons.

The buildings and their landscape stand as a testimony to Marie Byles' life and vision as a feminist and a conservationist. These subjects are of increasing interest to contemporary Australians and are helping to shape our culture.

The place has potential to yield information that will contribute to an understanding of the cultural or natural history of New South Wales.

The property as the only example of a manifestation of the concern for environmental issues and sustainable development in Australia. Ahimsa is an important active part of the ecosystem of Lane Cove National Park due to the topography of the property. Ahimsa is important as a soft visual edge to Lane Cove National Park and as a part of its visual image. An example of dry sclerophyll bushland on Sydney sandstone in the Northern Hills Region.

The place possesses uncommon, rare or endangered aspects of the cultural or natural history of New South Wales.

Uniqueness of the property as the only example of an early manifestation of the concern for environmental issues and sustainable development in Australia. Uniqueness of the property as the only example of the early efforts to introduce various sections of the society to living in harmony with nature by creating a physical focus (Hut of Happy Omens) and encouraging its use.

The place is important in demonstrating the principal characteristics of a class of cultural or natural places/environments in New South Wales.

The property is representative of the beliefs of Marie Byles as a collection of rudimentary buildings in a bushland setting.
