= Canoelands =

Coordinates: 33°30′30″S 151°03′42″E

- Suburb
- Coordinates
- Country: Australia
- State: New South Wales
- City: Sydney
- LGA: Hornsby Shire, The Hills Shire
- Location: 60 km (37 mi) north-west of Sydney CBD

Government
  - State electorate: Hornsby
  - Federal division: Berowra
- Elevation: 269 m (883 ft)

Population
  - Total: 177 (2021 census)
- Postcode: 2157
- Parish: Frederick, Marramarra
Suburbs around Canoelands
Leets Vale Maroota	Lower Macdonald	Webbs Creek
Maroota South	Canoelands	Wisemans Ferry
Glenorie	Forest Glen	Fiddletown

Canoelands is a suburb of northern Sydney, in the state of New South Wales, Australia. Canoelands is 60 kilometres north of the Sydney central business district, in the local government area of Hornsby Shire and The Hills Shire.

== Geography ==
Canoelands is a small hamlet near Glenorie, consisting of some 80 houses and 247 people extending out towards the east from Old Northern Road. Canoelands is between the hamlets of Forest Glen and Maroota and is 10 km north of the village of Glenorie and 20 km south of the village of Wisemans Ferry. By road, Canoelands is 55 km north of the Sydney Harbour Bridge.

The landform of the area is on Canoelands Ridge, a high, undulating, dissected plateau of Hawkesbury Sandstone with many steep gullies covered with dry sclerophyll forest, predominantly tall varieties of hardwood trees of the genus Eucalyptus. It has an area of 60 km^{2} and is surrounded on three sides by the Marramarra National Park, a wilderness area of 11,759 ha.

Mount Blake lies some 2 km east of the eastern end of Canoelands Road. The geodetic survey station there is 270.3 m above sea level. This makes it one of the highest natural points between the northern side of Sydney Harbour and the Hawkesbury River. The highest point at 278m is at 49 Canoelands Rd. All drainage from the area is into the Hawkesbury-Nepean Basin.

== History ==
=== Aboriginal culture ===
The area was inhabited by Indigenous Australians of the Dharug-speaking tribes. To the west they join the Boorooberongal clan (which extended to Windsor) and the Cattai clan (extending to Richmond) and to the south they joined the Bidjigal people around Castle Hill. Dharug made up family groups or clans all the way to the sea, in what has become known as Eora since colonial disruption. Within Canoelands there are many Aboriginal rock carvings in caves and on rocky outcrops. Stories of the Dreaming which continue knowledge through millennia. These are all under the care of the National Parks and Wildlife Service.

=== European settlement ===
In early times, it became a timber-getting area for Sydney. The treefellers found tall stringybark gumtrees (E. cephalocarpa) with large, uniform patches of bark missing. These pieces of bark were cut out with stone axes and used by the local Aboriginal people to make canoes to use on the Hawkesbury River. Such trees were aptly named canoe trees.

As the trees were used for mill logs, none remain in the area but preserved specimens may be examined at other places, e.g., in the Pioneers Park at Griffith, New South Wales. The area was originally named "The Canoe Grounds" and is shown as such in a Gregory's Directory of 1946. Some time after that it became known as "Canoelands". This name was officially gazetted in the NSW Government Gazette dated 12 November 1993 and had its boundaries specified and officially designated as a suburb of Sydney in the NSW Government Gazette No.145, dated 1 December 1995.

The first landholding in the Parish of Marramarra, which includes Canoelands, was of 6 acres (24,000 m^{2}) on the northern side of Marramarra Creek below Mount Blake. It was purchased by John Blake for one pound and ten shillings on 6 June 1835. The land had been advertised for sale by auction in an advertisement dated 13 December 1834.

== Transport ==
Old Northern Road was convict-built and is a major connecting route stretching north for 34 km from Baulkham Hills to Wisemans Ferry. The suburb has two other roadways: Canoelands Road which is a 9 km long cul-de-sac, and Marra Avenue which is a 2.2 km long cul-de-sac. The former is bituminised for most of its length and the latter has a wholly bituminised surface.

Picturesque rural, mountain and city views can be had from many locations along these roads. The first and still the only street light in the suburb was erected on the corner of Old Northern and Canoelands Roads on 6 June 1994. At first it was only activated by the headlights of approaching cars but this proved to be quite erratic. After a month or two this was abandoned and it was lit as at present, from sunset until sunrise.

== Rural areas ==
Canoelands is at the far northern end of the Hornsby Shire Council's coverage and has the Local Government land usage classification of Rural Lands. Holdings must have a minimum area of 10 ha which cannot be subdivided and only one dwelling may be erected on each. However, the erection of necessary agricultural buildings is permitted.

Industry in the area consists of four commercial plant nurseries and three large stonefruit orchards. The orchards are largely covered by synthetic netting to minimise the depredations of grey-headed flying foxes (Pteropus poliocephalus) which attack the fruit trees when carrying fruit. The fruit grown are peaches, nectarines and plums. There is also some cashcrop market gardening such as tomatoes, snowpeas and zucchini from time to time. Apiarists bring their beehives when the orchards are in flower for their bees to gather honey and assist in the pollination and setting of fruit.

A large well known commercial nursery exists on Canoelands Road which supplies major retail nursery outlets throughout NSW. There is an aggregate quarry and a sandstone quarry in the area. The Hawkesbury sandstone is a basically cream-colored sedimentary rock with colorful patterns of red, orange, yellow and white. It was once used to build houses but is now used as dimension stone and sawn stone, principally for landscaping architecture or as feature panels in housing. The area also contains some lenses of white and blue shale, the former being used as an admixture with clay to make blonde housebricks.

== Services ==
No shopping facility is available in Canoelands, the nearest being in Glenorie or in the major regional shopping centre of Castle Hill, some 32 km to the south.

The Canoelands Rural Fire Brigade station and the local optical fibre telephone exchange are both located at the corner of Canoelands and Old Northern Roads. The area has single and 3-phase electricity, natural gas, telephone and broadband services online but is without reticulated water or sewerage, residents relying on rainwater tanks and dams for water and on septic systems for sewage disposal. Many homes have stand-by diesel-powered generators to safeguard the operation of their water supply pumps and refrigeration in case of power blackouts. One residence is fully solar-powered. The Sydney-Newcastle oil/gas pipeline runs along a good length of Canoelands Road before turning north to go under the Hawkesbury River and has two radio-controlled valve stations in Canoelands.
