= Berowra =

- Suburb
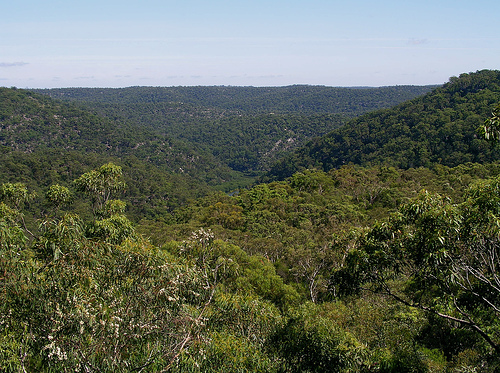
- Looking north over Berowra Regional Valley Park

- Interactive map of Berowra
- Country: Australia
- State: New South Wales
- City: Sydney
- LGA: Hornsby Shire
- Location: 36 km (22 mi) N of Sydney CBD; 40 km (25 mi) SW of Gosford

Government
  - State electorate: Hornsby
  - Federal division: Berowra

Area
  - Total: 8.7 km^{2} (3.4 sq mi)
- Elevation: 215 m (705 ft)

Population
  - Total: 4,762 (2021 census)
  - Density: 547/km^{2} (1,418/sq mi)
- Postcode: 2081, 2082
Suburbs around Berowra
Berowra Heights	Berowra Heights	Cowan
Berrilee	Berowra	Brooklyn
Mount Kuring-gai	Mount Kuring-gai	Cottage Point

Berowra (/bəˈraʊrə/) is an outer suburb of Northern Sydney located in the state of New South Wales, Australia. It is located 36 kilometres north of the Sydney central business district, in the local government area of Hornsby Shire. Berowra is south-east of the suburbs of Berowra Heights and east of Berowra Waters. The name Berowra means place of many shells, referring to the many shell middens on Berowra Creek.

== Geography ==
Berowra is located 36 kilometres north of the Sydney central business district and lies at an altitude of 215 metres. Surrounded by bushland within rugged terrain, it borders the national parks of both the Berowra Valley and Ku-ring-gai Chase.

== Commercial area ==
Berowra is largely residential with a small retail precinct lining the Pacific Highway near the railway station. In May 2007, a new shopping complex opened on Turner Road in Berowra Heights; this was a landmark development for the future prospects of the area.

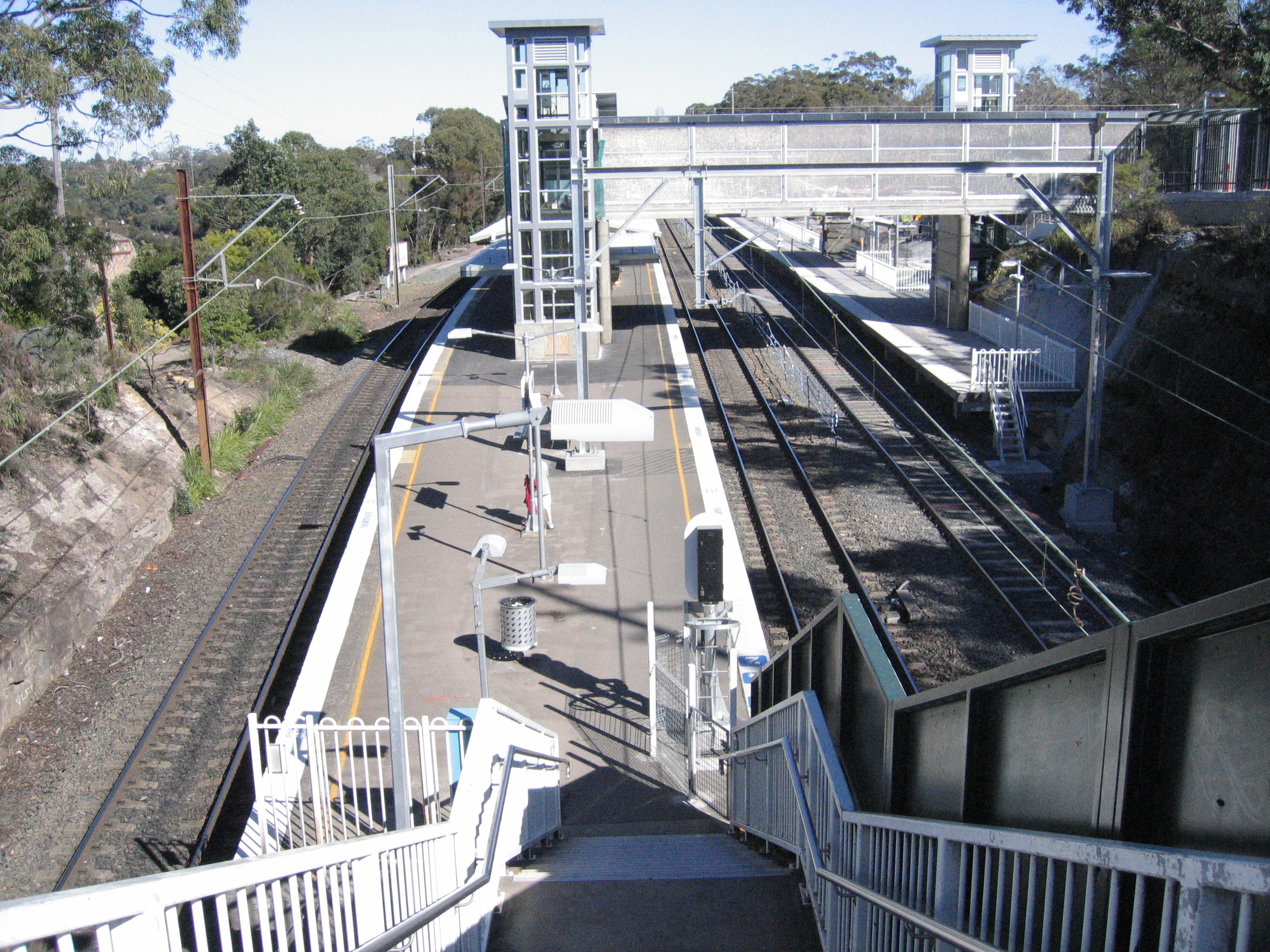
Berowra railway station

== Transport ==
Berowra is located off the Pacific Highway. The Pacific Motorway runs to the east, between Berowra and the Ku-ring-gai Chase National Park. In January 1960 a heavy vehicle checking station opened. In December 1968 the Pacific Motorway opened from Berowra to the Hawkesbury River. As it was a toll road, toll booths were installed at Berowra adjacent to the heavy vehicle checking station. This closed when the Pacific Motorway was extended south to Wahroonga in March 1989.

Berowra railway station is located on the Main Northern line. It is served by Sydney Trains North Shore & Western Line and NSW TrainLink Central Coast & Newcastle Line services to Sydney, Hornsby, and Newcastle.

== History ==
The Traditional Owners of the land are the Darug and GuriNgai peoples. They had been there at least 15,000 to 20,000 years before European settlers arrived.

Berowra is a Darug word that means place of many shells. The Berowra area has many Aboriginal carvings.

=== British settlement ===
One of the early land grants in the Berowra area was to John Crumpton in 1867. George Collingridge was granted 88 acres (360,000 m^{2}) in 1880 and played a part in having the Main Northern railway line extended, so that a station was opened at Berowra in 1887. He also supported the building of a post office in 1900 and a road to Berowra Waters which opened in 1902. Berowra Post Office opened on 1 April 1897. Mary Wall was granted 60 acres (240,000 m^{2}) of land near Goodwyn Road off the Pacific Highway in 1887.

The first school was set up in Mary Wall's house before it was moved to what is now the Berowra District Hall on the corner of Berowra Waters Road and Crowley Road roundabout.

Berowra experienced slow growth through the post-war years, with outer suburban development from the 1950s onward.

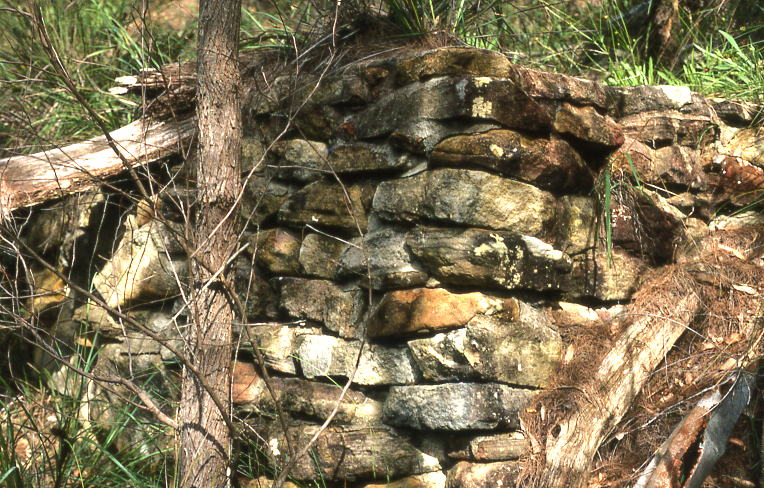
Remains of a bush hut, Berowra area

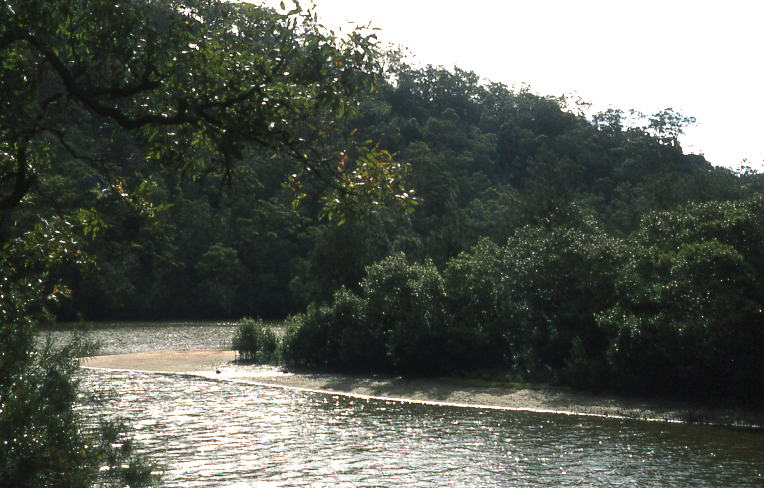
Berowra Creek

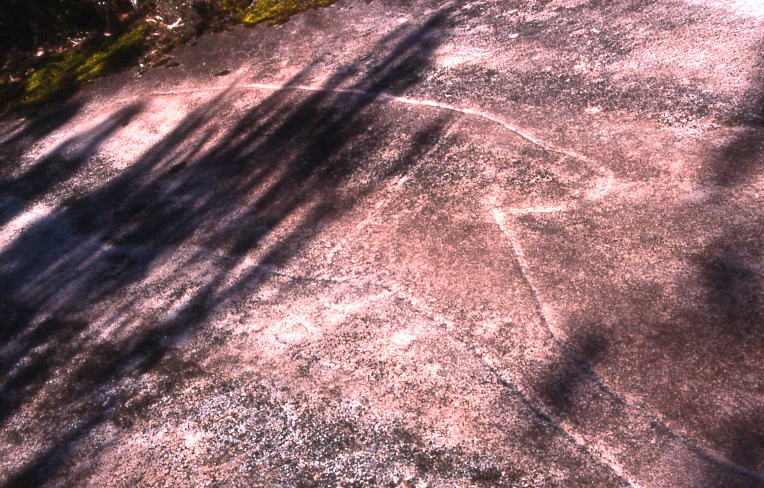
Aboriginal rock carving, Berowra area

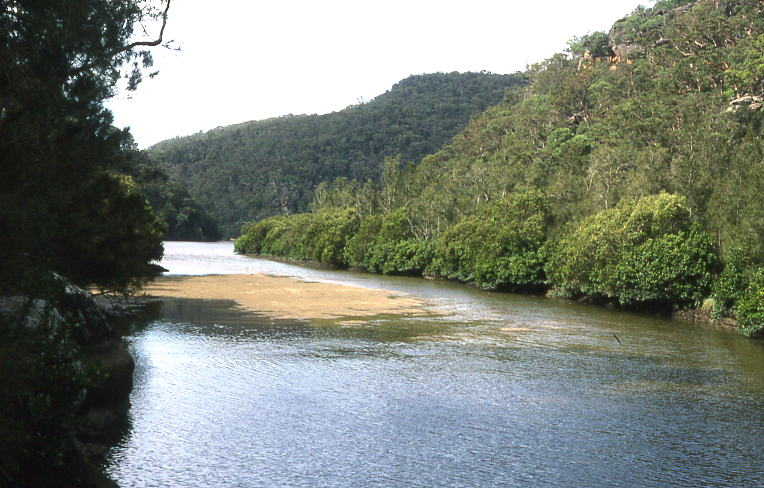
Junction of Berowra and Calna Creeks

== Primary schools ==
Berowra and Berowra Heights share four primary schools:

- Berowra Public School (Berowra).
- Pacific Berowra Christian School (Berowra).
- Wideview Public School (Berowra Heights).
- St Bernard's Catholic Primary School (Berowra Heights)

== Churches ==
Berowra and Berowra Heights share four churches:

- St Mark's Anglican Church (Berowra)
- Berowra Baptist Church (Berowra)
- St Bernard's Catholic Church (Berowra Heights)
- Berowra Uniting Church (Berowra Heights)

== Clubs and Community Groups ==
- Apex
- Berowra Musical Society
- Berowra Toastmasters
- Berowra Rotary Club
- Lions Club
- Scouts
- Girl Guides
- The Probus club of Berowra
- Netball Club
- Soccer Club
- Football Club
- Cricket Club

== Demographics ==
At the time the 2021 census was conducted, the population of Berowra was 4,762, consisting of 2,363 (49.7%) males and 2,396 (50.3%) females. 72.2% of residents were born in Australia, while the next most common country of birth was England at 7.1%. 84.0% of residents only spoke English at home. The most common responses for religion were No Religion (38.7%), Catholic (20.8%) and Anglican (16.9%). Of the 1,493 occupied dwellings in Berowra, 93.9% were separate houses. The median weekly household income is A$2,781 and the mean household size consists of 3.0 individuals.

== Notable residents ==
- Margaret Preston - painter

== Events ==
Every year on the 2nd Sunday of August Berowra hosts the Annual Woodchop Festival. Running since 1995, this festival attracts thousands of people every year.
