= Berowra Heights =

Outer Suburb of Sydney, New South Wales, Australia

- Suburb
- Interactive map of Berowra Heights
- Country: Australia
- State: New South Wales
- City: Sydney
- LGA: Hornsby Shire
- Location: 39 km (24 mi) north-west of Sydney CBD; 42 km (26 mi) south-east of Gosford
- Established: 1887

Government
  - State electorate: Hornsby
  - Federal division: Berowra
- Elevation: 216 m (709 ft)

Population
  - Total: 5,286 (2021 census)
- Postcode: 2082
Suburbs around Berowra Heights
Berowra Waters		Brooklyn
Berrilee	Berowra Heights	Cowan
Hornsby Heights	Mount Kuring-gai	Berowra

Berowra Heights is an outer suburb of Northern Sydney, in the state of New South Wales, Australia 39 kilometres north of the Sydney central business district, in the local government area of Hornsby Shire. Berowra Heights is north-west of the suburb of Berowra and east of Berowra Waters.

== History ==
Berowra is an Aboriginal word that means place of many shells.

Berowra Heights Post Office opened on 2 September 1968.

== Demographics ==
According to the 2021 census, there are 5,286 residents of Berowra Heights. 77.9% of these residents were born in Australia, while the most common other countries of birth are England (6.7%), New Zealand (1.3%), China (1.1%), South Africa (1%) and The Philippines (0.7%). 88.8% of residents only speak English at home, while other languages spoken at home include Mandarin (1.1%), Russian (0.6%), Spanish (0.6%), Persian (0.6%) and German (0.5%). The most common religious affiliations are No Religion (42.9%), Catholic (20.8%) and Anglican (17.8%).

== Commercial area ==
Business is conducted in three shopping areas; the highway precinct, the Village Green and Berowra Marketplace (Foodtown). Businesses include a Bendigo Bank Community Bank, Coles supermarket, two pharmacies, a comprehensive medical centre and a range of restaurants.

== Transport ==
Access to Berowra Heights is by road from Berowra, to the east, via Berowra Waters Road. Alternatively, the Berowra Waters Ferry, a car ferry, connects Berowra Waters with the western end of Berowra Waters Road. CDC NSW route 599 provides a bus service from Berowra Heights to Berowra railway station and route 597 from Berowra to Hornsby railway station.

== Schools ==
There are two primary schools located in Berowra Heights, Wideview Public School and St Bernard's Catholic Primary School. Some children living in Berowra Heights may also attend one of the two primary schools in the neighbouring suburb of Berowra, being Berowra Public School and Pacific Berowra Christian School.

Despite not having a high school of its own, Berowra Heights is included within the catchment zones of three New South Wales public high schools. These include Asquith High School (ex Asquith Girls High School), Hornsby High School (ex Asquith Boys High School) and further away, Ku-ring-gai High School in North Turramurra.

== Churches ==
Together, Berowra and Berowra Heights have four churches:

- St Mark's Anglican Church (Berowra).
- Berowra Baptist Church (Berowra).
- St Bernard's Catholic Church (Berowra Heights).
- Berowra Uniting Church (Berowra Heights).

== Services ==
Bush fires present a very real threat for the Berowra area due to the proximity of bushland. Fire protection for urbanised parts of Berowra Heights is provided by Station 75 (Berowra) of Fire and Rescue NSW and supported by Community Fire Units. Fire protection for bushland parts of Berowra Heights is provided by the NSW New South Wales Rural Fire Service, through the Berowra Rural Fire Brigade, located in new purpose built premises (opened 11 August 2018) at 14a Berowra Waters Road in Berowra.

== See also ==
- Dangar Island
- Hawkesbury River Railway Bridge
- Hawkesbury River
- Ku-ring-gai Chase National Park

== Notes ==
- The Book of Sydney Suburbs, Compiled by Frances Pollen, Angus & Robertson Publishers, 1990, Published in Australia ISBN 0-207-14495-8
