= Dural, New South Wales =

Suburb of Sydney, Australia

Dural
- Suburb
- Interactive map of Dural
- Country: Australia
- State: New South Wales
- Region: Hills District, New South Wales
- City: Sydney
- LGAs: The Hills Shire; Hornsby Shire
- Location: 36 km (22 mi) NW of Sydney CBD

Government
  - State electorates: Hornsby; Castle Hill
  - Federal division: Berowra
- Elevation: 208 m (682 ft)

Population
  - Total: 7,900 (2021 census)
- Postcode: 2158
Suburbs around Dural
Kenthurst	Middle Dural	Galston; Hornsby Heights
Glenhaven	Dural	Hornsby
Castle Hill	Cherrybrook	Westleigh

Dural is a semi-rural suburb of Sydney, in the state of New South Wales, Australia. It is 36 kilometres north-west of the Sydney central business district and in the local government areas of Hornsby Shire and The Hills Shire. Dural is part of the Hills District. Round Corner is a locality in the south-western part of Dural.

== History ==
The original inhabitants of the Dural area were the Darug people. Dural is derived from Dooral-Dooral, an Aboriginal name meaning a smoking hollow tree.

The name Dooral appeared on Surveyor Richard Dundiate's map of April 1817 and originally covered the whole area including present day Glenorie, Galston, Arcadia and Middle Dural. Located on the Old Northern Road, a historic road built by convicts between 1825 and 1836 to link early Sydney, in the Colony of New South Wales, with the fertile Hunter Valley to the north. The first grant in the area was made to George Hall in 1879. At an earlier stage, a local settler, James Roughley, had donated land to be used for the building of a church. A sandstone chapel was built on Old Northern Road circa 1846, with a vestry, apse and shingle roof, plus a bell turret on the western gable. A porch was added soon after. The chapel—known as St Jude's Church—is now listed on the Register of the National Estate.

Dural Post Office opened on 1 August 1864.

== Demographics ==
According to the 2021 census, there were 7,900 residents in Dural. 64.1% of people were born in Australia. The next most common countries of birth were China 4.1%, England 4.0%, India 3.0%, South Africa 2.0% and Malaysia 1.6%. 69.1% of people spoke only English at home. Other languages spoken at home included Arabic 3.4%, Cantonese 2.6%, Persian (excluding Dari) 1.4% and Italian 1.4%. The most common responses for religion in Dural were Catholic 28.1%, No Religion 25.9%, Anglican 14.9%, and Buddhism 3.8%. The median weekly household income was $2,489 was a fair bit higher than the national median of $1,746 per month. 80.3% of occupied dwellings were separate houses and 64.5% of houses had 4 or more bedrooms. There was a high level of home ownership in Dural, with 81.0% of people either owning their house outright or owning with a mortgage.

== Schools ==
- Lorien Novalis School
- Dural Public School
- Redfield College
- Pacific Hills Christian School
- Warrah Rudolf Steiner School
- Middle Dural Public School

== Sport and recreation ==
Dural plays host to the Dural Rugby Club, Dural Country Club, Dural Country Club soccer teams, Redfield Lions Soccer and Rugby Clubs and the Pacific Hills Pumas Soccer Club. Dural Rugby Club organises Wallatag in the Summer Months which is held on a Friday night at Bernie Mullane Sports Complex in Kellyville. The Northwest Hawks Junior Rugby League Football Club has its home ground at Dural Park, Quarry Road Dural

== Transport ==
Dural has no railway station but is connected to Castle Hill metro station, Cherrybrook metro station and Pennant Hills railway station via bus services operated by CDC NSW. A CDC NSW depot is located on New Line Road next to McDonald's.

== Media ==
Between 1985 and 1987, Dural was the site for tapings of the television game show It's a Knockout shown nationally on the Ten Network and hosted by Billy J Smith and Fiona MacDonald. However, due to numerous complaints from local residents the show was cancelled in 1987. Dural was also the setting for the home of the wealthy Hamilton family, at 631 Old Northern Road, in the soap opera Sons And Daughters during its 1981–1987 run. A manor house in Dural, Le Chateau, was the primary filming location of reality television show Beauty and the Geek Australia. Le Chateau is now owned by Harach Lucas, founder and CEO of information Technology services company MicroChannel.

== Communications ==
Quarry Road is home to the Amateur Radio New South Wales clubrooms, library, and broadcasting site.
