= Berrilee =

- Suburb
- Interactive map of Berrilee
- Country: Australia
- State: New South Wales
- City: Sydney
- LGA: Hornsby Shire
- Location: 38 km (24 mi) north-west of Sydney CBD

Government
  - State electorate: Hornsby
  - Federal division: Berowra
- Elevation: 160 m (520 ft)

Population
  - Total: 212 (2021 census)
- Postcode: 2159
Suburbs around Berrilee
Arcadia		Berowra Waters
Arcadia	Berrilee	Berowra Heights
Galston	Hornsby Heights	Mount Ku-ring-gai

Berrilee is a semi-rural outer suburb of Sydney, in the state of New South Wales, Australia. Berrilee is located 38 kilometres north of the Sydney central business district, in the local government area of Hornsby Shire.

Berrilee sits on the western shore of Berowra Creek, which empties into the Hawkesbury River.

== History ==
Berrilee is believed to be derived from an Aboriginal word 'Buraillee' possibly having something to do with mouth or food.

== Demographics ==
According to the 2021 census, there were 212 people in Berrilee. 75.0% of people were born in Australia and 84.0% of people only spoke English at home.

== Local area ==
Berrilee is a small town, without any stores. There is one small store near Berowra Waters and another in Arcadia. There was a primary school, but due to a lack of students (there were less than seven), it closed down in 1957. It re-opened shortly after but closed down and the property was sold in 2005.
