= Milsons Passage =

Outer Suburb of Sydney, New South Wales, Australia

Coordinates: 33°31′01″S 151°10′34″E

- Suburb
- Coordinates
- Country: Australia
- State: New South Wales
- City: Sydney
- LGA: Hornsby Shire

Government
  - Federal division: Berowra

Population
  - Total: 32 (2021 census)

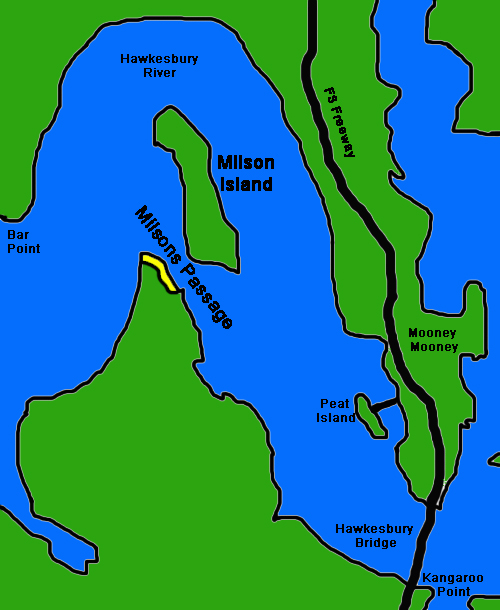
Sketch map of Milsons Passage & Milson Island on the Hawkesbury River. The passage in the Hawkesbury River called Milsons Passage is marked on the map. Milson Island, only accessible by boat or ferry is marked on the map. The suburb by the name of Milsons Passage is marked on the map in yellow. The suburb is only accessible by boat.

Milsons Passage is a suburb of Sydney, in the state of New South Wales, Australia. It is located in the Hornsby Shire local government area. According to the 2021 census, its population was 32.

== See also ==
- Dangar Island
- Hawkesbury River Railway Bridge
- Hawkesbury River
- Ku-ring-gai Chase National Park
