= Glenorie =

- Suburb
- Interactive map of Glenorie
- Coordinates: 33°36′8″S 151°0′9″E
- Country: Australia
- State: New South Wales
- City: Sydney
- LGAs: The Hills Shire; Hornsby Shire
- Location: 44 km (27 mi) NW of Sydney CBD

Government
  - State electorates: Hawkesbury; Hornsby
  - Federal division: Berowra
- Elevation: 165 m (541 ft)

Population
  - Total: 3,792 (SAL 2021)
- Postcode: 2157
Suburbs around Glenorie
Maroota South	Canoelands	Forest Glen
Cattai; Maraylya	Glenorie	Fiddletown; Arcadia
Kenthurst	Middle Dural	Galston

Glenorie is a rural suburb of Sydney, in the state of New South Wales, Australia, 44 km (27 mi) north-west of the Sydney central business district in the local government areas of The Hills Shire and Hornsby Shire. Glenorie is part of the Hills District.

== History ==
=== Aboriginal inhabitants ===
The original inhabitants of the Glenorie area were known as the Dharug people. The Dharug were the custodians of the majority of what is now the Greater Sydney region. They were divided into a number of different clans. These clans were reduced in number after European settlement and, as a result there is very little information remaining on how the local area was utilised or how the people lived.

=== European settlement ===
The Glenorie locality was part of a large parcel of land reserved by Governor King in 1802. In 1816 Governor Macquarie declared the area open for settlement.

The area was along the route of the Great North Road, construction of which began in 1825 by convict labour to link Sydney with the fertile Hunter Valley to the north. The locality formed a portion of a land grant belonging to George Acres, as well as two smaller grants to settlers named Hathaway and Saunders. Glenorie was originally part of the wider Dural area and was known as Upper or North Dural.

In November 1893 the North Dural Progress Association resolved to change the name of the settlement at North Dural for the stated reason that “we are getting quite a little township up here, the place should be properly named”. At a meeting in December after an “animated discussion” the majority of members decided on two names from a list: ‘Hazeldean’ and ‘Glenorie’. The Progress Association submitted the two options to the Postal Department (with the final selection to be “left in the hands of the postal authorities”). The authorities eventually opted for ‘Glenorie’. On 1 October 1894 the local post office was renamed Glenorie Post Office.

The origin of the name Glenorie is the subject of dispute. One local source identifies the name as an Aboriginal word meaning ‘much water’. Other sources claim Glenorie was named after a town in Scotland (though no actual place has been identified).

== Population ==
At the 2021 census, there were 3,792 residents in Glenorie. 76.5% of people were born in Australia. The next most common country of birth was England at 4.1%. 79.0% of people spoke only English at home. Other languages spoken at home included Arabic 6.5% and Italian 3.0%. The top religious affiliations were Catholic 36.7% and Anglican 14.6%. The most common ancestries were English 36.0%, Australian 30.6%, Italian 11.3%, Irish 9.8% and Lebanese 9.4%. The most common responses for religion were Catholic 36.7%, No Religion 28.1% and Anglican 14.6%. Almost all of the occupied dwellings were separate houses and the median monthly mortgage payment was $3,000.

== Commercial area ==
Glenorie has a rural character; however, it is close to the major suburbs of Castle Hill and Hornsby which both offer all the necessary services.

Glenorie RSL club is situated in the commercial area.

Glenorie Village features retail shops, an award-winning bakery and cafe, and a newly opened gym.

== Education ==
Glenorie Public School was established in 1888. Hillside Public School was established in 1926. The local secondary school is Galston High School.

== Notable people ==
- Jon English - singer and actor, a former resident
- Maggie Kirkpatrick, an actress, and current resident.
- Adam Wilkinson - Australian Entertainment Manager, discovered 5 Seconds of Summer. A former resident

== Climate ==
Climate data for Glenorie
Month	Jan	Feb	Mar	Apr	May	Jun	Jul	Aug	Sep	Oct	Nov	Dec	Year
Record high °C (°F)	40.0 (104.0)	42.2 (108.0)	39.7 (103.5)	33.3 (91.9)	27.3 (81.1)	23.9 (75.0)	24.4 (75.9)	26.7 (80.1)	35.6 (96.1)	35.8 (96.4)	38.3 (100.9)	40.4 (104.7)	42.2 (108.0)
Mean daily maximum °C (°F)	27.7 (81.9)	27.2 (81.0)	26.4 (79.5)	23.6 (74.5)	19.9 (67.8)	16.7 (62.1)	16.6 (61.9)	17.8 (64.0)	20.6 (69.1)	23.3 (73.9)	25.0 (77.0)	27.5 (81.5)	22.7 (72.9)
Mean daily minimum °C (°F)	16.4 (61.5)	16.5 (61.7)	15.0 (59.0)	12.0 (53.6)	8.7 (47.7)	6.8 (44.2)	5.3 (41.5)	6.5 (43.7)	8.3 (46.9)	11.4 (52.5)	13.0 (55.4)	15.1 (59.2)	11.2 (52.2)
Record low °C (°F)	6.1 (43.0)	10.0 (50.0)	5.3 (41.5)	5.0 (41.0)	−1.1 (30.0)	0.0 (32.0)	−1.1 (30.0)	−0.7 (30.7)	−1.1 (30.0)	3.9 (39.0)	5.6 (42.1)	8.3 (46.9)	−1.1 (30.0)
Average precipitation mm (inches)	100.0 (3.94)	113.5 (4.47)	104.8 (4.13)	82.0 (3.23)	79.1 (3.11)	96.2 (3.79)	52.5 (2.07)	59.2 (2.33)	51.7 (2.04)	70.9 (2.79)	80.1 (3.15)	76.0 (2.99)	965.7 (38.02)
Average precipitation days	8.8	9.4	9.9	7.9	7.7	8.6	6.4	6.5	6.4	8.0	8.6	7.9	96.1
