= Round Corner =

Locality in Australia

Coordinates: 33°41′47″S 151°00′59″E

Round Corner is a locality of the suburb of Dural in Sydney, in the state of New South Wales, Australia. It is part of the Hills and Hornsby shires.

== Round Corner Dural ==
A majority of the modern populace of Dural arrived after World War II from Europe. Although Round Corner was semi-rural for many years, The Hills Shire Council has recently upgraded and modernised the area. Round Corner Dural's population has steadily increased in recent years and appears that the trend will continue as the area continues to develop.
