= Electoral district of Hornsby =

Hornsby New South Wales—Legislative Assembly
- Interactive map of district boundaries from the 2023 state election
- State: New South Wales
- Created: 1927–1991, 1999–present
- MP: James Wallace
- Party: Liberal
- Namesake: Hornsby, New South Wales
- Electors: 61,257 (2024)
- Area: 320.13 km^{2} (123.6 sq mi)
- Demographic: Outer-metropolitan
Electorates around Hornsby:
Hawkesbury	Gosford	Gosford
Hawkesbury	Hornsby	Pittwater
Castle Hill	Epping	Wahroonga; Davidson

Electoral district of Hornsby is an electoral district of the New South Wales Legislative Assembly in Australia. Hornsby is one of two post-1927 electorates to have never been held by the Labor Party, and always by the Liberal Party, a predecessor party to the Liberals, or an independent, the other being Vaucluse. (Note: Many regional seats such as Port Macquarie have never been held by Labor and only by either the Liberals, The Nationals or an independent, but those seats do not count because The Nationals have held them before.)

The seat is currently represented by James Wallace of the Liberal Party, following the by-election held on 19 October 2024, after Matt Kean's resignation.

== Geography ==
On its current boundaries, Hornsby takes in the suburbs of Asquith, Berrilee, Berowra, Berowra Heights, Berowra Waters, Brooklyn, Canoelands, Cowan, Dangar Island, Galston, Glenorie, Hornsby Heights, Laughtondale, Mount Colah, Mount Kuring-gai, Singletons Mill, Sunny Corner and parts of Dural, Hornsby, Middle Dural, Pennant Hills, Round Corner, Thompsons Corner and Wisemans Ferry.

== Members for Hornsby ==
First incarnation (1927–1991)
Member	Party	Term
James Shand	Nationalist	1927–1932
James Shand	United Australia	1932–1941
James Shand	Ind. United Australia	1941–1941
Sydney Storey	Ind. United Australia	1941–1945
Sydney Storey	Liberal	1945–1962
Sydney Storey	Independent Liberal	1962–1962
John Maddison	Liberal	1962–1973
Neil Pickard	Liberal	1973–1991
Second incarnation (1999–present)
Stephen O'Doherty	Liberal	1999–2002
Judy Hopwood	Liberal	2002–2011
Matt Kean	Liberal	2011–2024

== Election results ==
2024 Hornsby by-election
Party	Candidate	Votes	%	±%
Liberal	James Wallace	24,578	49.93	+6.64
Greens	Tania Salitra	12,713	25.83	+11.54
One Nation	Steve Busch	2,740	5.57	−2.36
Independent	Brendon Clarke	2,205	4.48	+4.48
Independent	Benjamin Caswell	1,680	3.41	+0.54
Animal Justice	Sheila Milgate	1,616	3.28	+3.28
Libertarian	Marc Hendrickx	1,508	3.06	−0.86
Sustainable Australia	Justin Thomas	1,337	2.72	+1.03
Independent	Roger Woodward	847	1.72	+1.72
Total formal votes		49,224	96.75	−0.89
Informal votes		1,655	3.25	+0.89
Turnout		50,879	83.06	−8.95
Two-candidate-preferred result
Liberal	James Wallace	26,781	64.34	+6.30
Greens	Tania Salitra	14,840	35.66	+35.66
Liberal hold		Swing	N/A	
