= Berowra Creek =

Coordinates: 33°32′18″S 151°08′39″E

Berowra Thornleigh Gully (Gn), Fish Pond Creek (R)
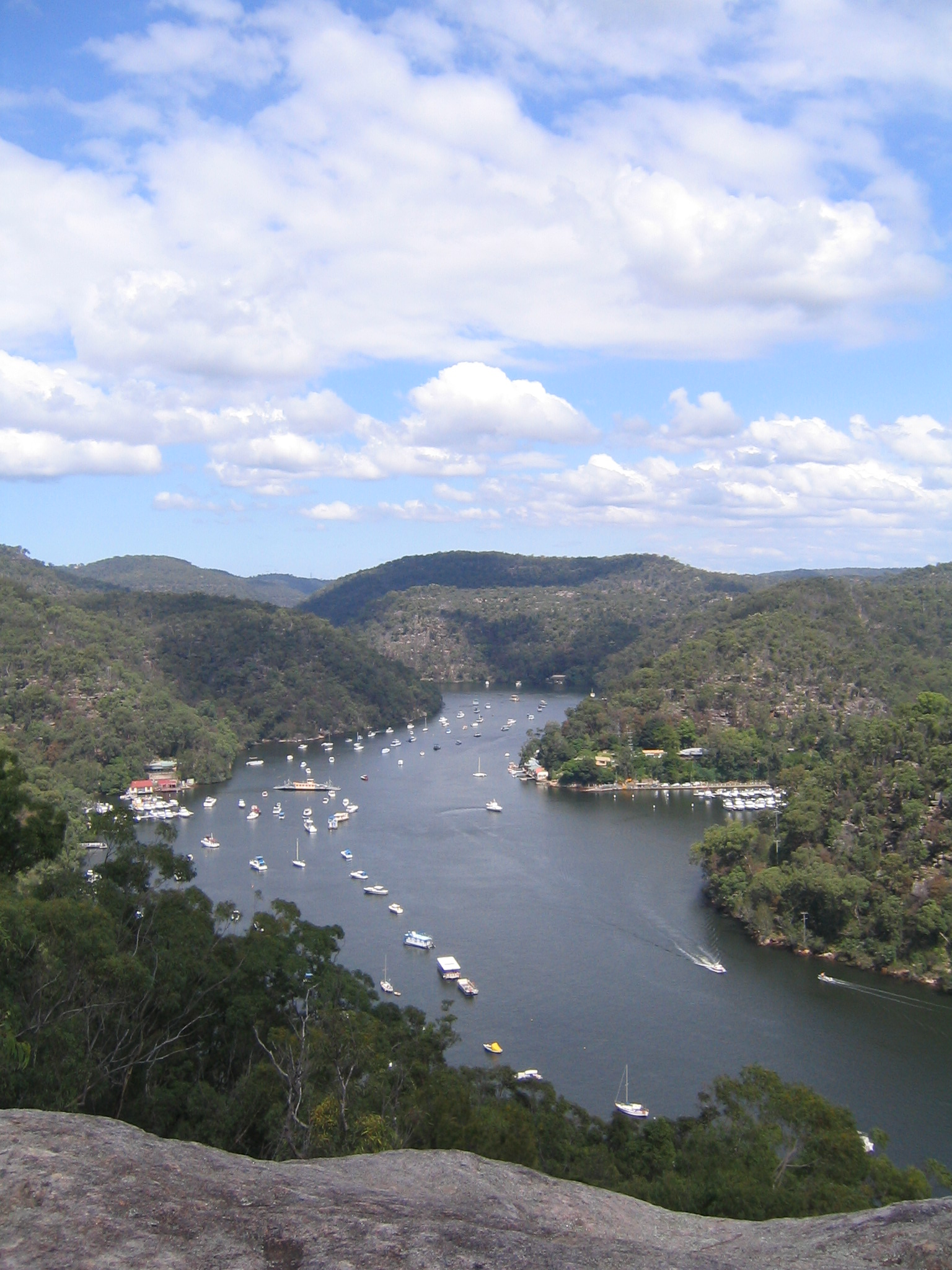
- Berowra Creek at Berowra Waters
- Etymology: Aboriginal: "place of many winds"

Location
- Country: Australia
- State: New South Wales
- Region: Sydney Basin (IBRA), Greater metropolitan Sydney
- Local government areas: Hornsby

Physical characteristics
- Source: Pennant Hills
  - location: Hornsby Heights
  - elevation: 82 m (269 ft)
- Mouth: confluence with Hawkesbury River
  - location: west of Brooklyn
  - elevation: 0 m (0 ft)
- Length: 22 km (14 mi)

Basin features
- River system: Hawkesbury-Nepean catchment
- National park: Marramarra

The Berowra Creek, a watercourse that is part of the Hawkesbury-Nepean catchment, is located to the north of the Sydney central business district in the Hornsby Shire of New South Wales, Australia.

== Course and features ==
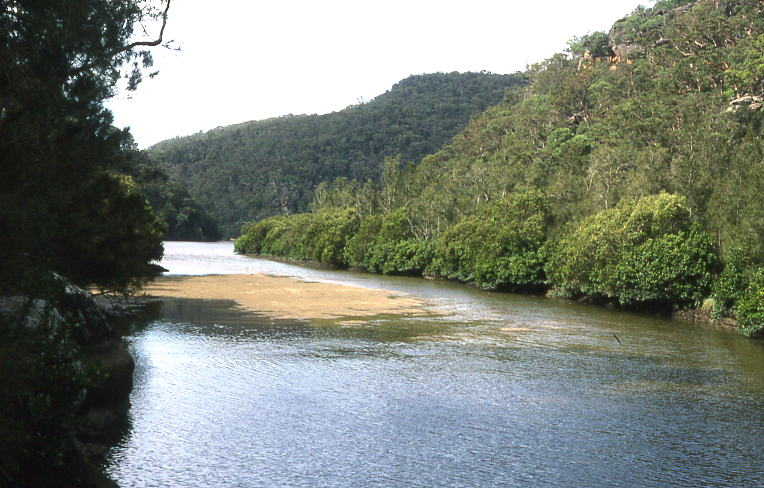
Confluence of the Berowra and Calna creeks

The Berowra Creek rises near Pennant Hills and flows generally north northeast before reaching its confluence with the Hawkesbury River about 7 kilometres (4.3 mi) west of Brooklyn, and about 25 kilometres (16 mi) from the Tasman Sea. The river descends 86 metres (282 ft) over its 22 kilometres (14 mi) course.

The creek is characterised by a drowned river valley estuary, consisting of steeply incised gorges with surrounding plateau areas. It is fed by a number of small tributaries that drain the steep catchments adjacent to the waterway. The tidal limit is at the Rocky Fall Rapids, some 23 kilometres (14 mi) from the creek's mouth.

The area around the creek is most developed near its source in the south, influenced by the development of Hornsby and its surrounding suburbs. As the creek flows to the north, it flows through a catchment area that is mostly bushland and includes parts of the Marramarra National Park, the Muogamarra Nature Reserve, and the Berowra Valley Regional Park. The steep sides of the creek have limited development directly adjacent to the Berowra Creek estuary, most of which is only accessible by boat. However the small settlements of Berowra Waters and Berowra Creek are both located on its banks. The creek is a popular destination for boating, fishing and other outdoor recreational activities.

There are only two crossings of Berowra Creek. Galston Road crosses the upper reaches via a bridge in the Galston Gorge, between Galston and Hornsby Heights. Further downstream, the Berowra Waters Ferry, a toll-free car ferry, crosses between Berowra Waters and Berowra Heights.

The name, Berowra, is believed to be an Aboriginal word meaning "place of many winds".

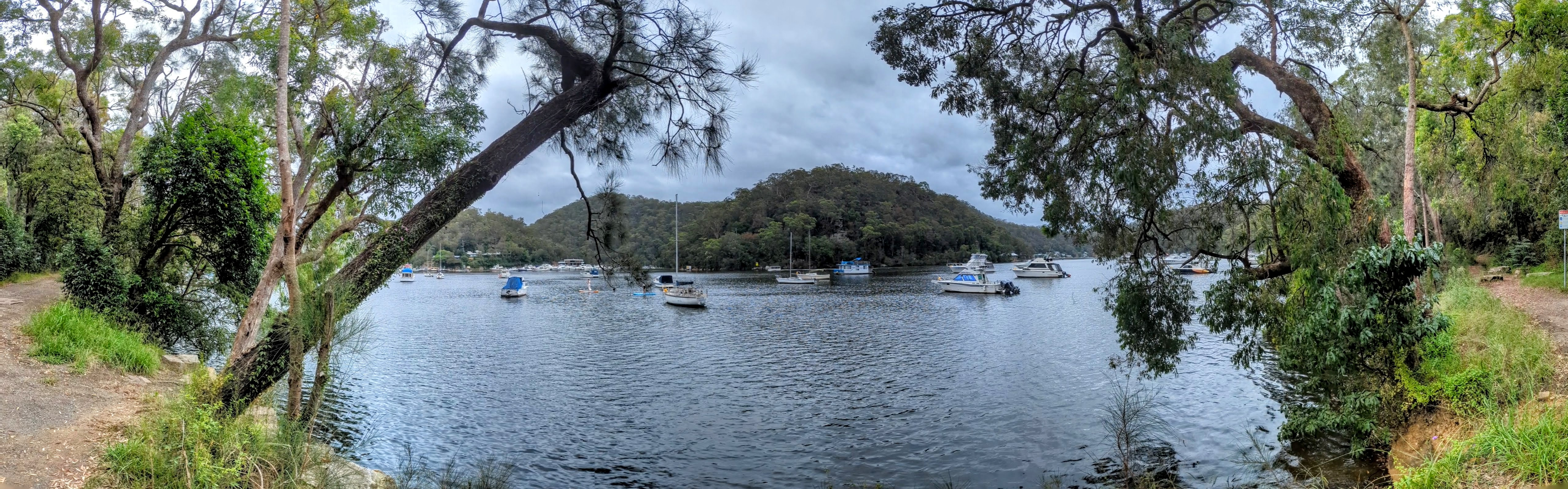
Berowra Creek seen from the end of the Hawkesbury Track

== See also ==
- List of rivers of Australia
- List of rivers of New South Wales (A–K)
- Rivers of New South Wales
