= T. J. Power =

Australian actor

T.J. Power
- Born: Sydney, New South Wales
- Education: Galston High School; Western Australian Academy of Performing Arts
- Occupations: Actor, writer, director
- Years active: 2008–present
- Notable work: Offspring
- Spouse: Kathryn Sgroi
- Children: 2

T.J. Power is an Australian actor, writer and director, known for his role as Will in Offspring.

== Early life and education ==
Power was born in Sydney, New South Wales, to Gerard (a financial planner) and Jayne Power (a relief schoolteacher); the youngest of three children, including Kristy and Tanya. The family lived in Arcadia, in Sydney's north-west and spent Christmas holidays with Power's paternal grandparents on a farm in Gundagai.

As a child, Power played competitive sports, until he was gifted a guitar as a gift, after which he turned his attention to the performing arts.

Power attended high school at Galston High School, where he was in the school band, had his own rock band, participated in school plays and musicals and studied drama as an HSC subject. Power landed his first acting job around the age of 15, with a training video for a fast-food chain. His mother drove him to acting classes twice a week.

Power's mother died of cancer, at age 49, when he was age 17 and in his final year of high school. His father remarried Jayne's friend Pauline, who had four kids of her own.

Power went on to study acting at the Western Australian Academy of Performing Arts (WAAPA) in Perth, graduating in 2008.

== Career ==
Power made his acting debut as Demetrius in A Midsummer Night's Dream for Shakespeare WA, receiving an Equity Guild Awards nomination for Best Newcomer.

In 2009, Power recorded a solo EP, "New Wheel", before landing his first feature film with 2010 Australian drama Wasted on the Young and appearing in 2011 crime series Underbelly: Razor. He then landed the role of Javier Bardem’s son in American film Eat Pray Love, alongside Julia Roberts.

Power went on to appeared in 2012 musical comedy film The Sapphires (2012) opposite Deborah Mailman and Jessica Mauboy. That same year, he released an EP, "Traveller", with The Art of Grace (named for his Grandparents Art and Grace), a band he formed with wife Kathryn and two other members, including Mitch Bruzzese, who he used to play together in a high school rock band.

In 2014, Power starred as Sam in ensemble sex comedy film The Little Death, which saw him nominated for the 2014 AACTA Award for Best Actor in a Supporting Role for his performance. That same year, he appeared in 2014 biographical TV movie Parer's War about war photographer Damien Parer.

Power came to further attention when he joined the cast of Network 10 comedy-drama series Offspring in 2016, alongside Kat Stewart and Asher Keddie, starring as the Proudman family’s surprise half-brother, lawyer Will Bowen. He played Robbie Weekes in 2016 biographical miniseries Molly about Australian music critic and journalist Molly Meldrum, opposite Samuel Johnson. He also played Sam in 2016 sci-fi thriller OtherLife, opposite Jessica De Gouw – his second film for filmmaker Ben C. Lucas, following Wasted on the Young. The following year, he appeared in US feature Halfway and 2017 Australian sci-fi thriller film OtherLife.

After moving to the United States, Power landed roles in CBS’s Criminal Minds, HBO’s Insecure and ABC’s Grey's Anatomy and voiced characters for animated series for Disney, Apple TV+ and YouTube.

Power discovered a passion for directing when, backstage at a theatre show, he made two improvised mockumentaries of an actor preparing for his role. This led to his professional directorial debut in 2017 with the comedy short Your Call is Important to Us, starring Andy Lee, which debuted at Australian film festival Flickerfest. It subsequently featured in several international festivals, winning numerous Best Film, Best Comedy, Best Director, Best Screenplay & Audience Choice awards. He followed this up with his short film, The Bus to Birra Birra, which won several awards including four at Film Invasion Los Angeles in 2020. He also directed numerous episodes of children's television series and music videos, including YouTube series Blippi & Meekah Adventures and the pilot of CocoMelon Classroom.

Power had a role in 2021 romantic comedy Resort to Love with Christina Milian, before appearing in 2024 American drama film The Neon Highway with Beau Bridges.

== Personal life ==
Power met his wife, theatre producer Kathryn Sgroi, while studying at WAAPA. They started dating in 2007 and were married in December 2014, beside a river in Leeton, in New South Wales. The couple relocated to Los Angeles in 2014, with their two children.

== Filmography ==
=== Film ===
==== As actor ====
Year	Title	Role	Notes	Ref
2008	Iris	Charlie	Short film	
2009	Hidden Clouds	Mark	Short film	
2010	Wasted on the Young	Brook		
2010	Eat Pray Love	Leon		
2010	Vulnerable	Craig		
2011	Pepperoni	Skirts	Short film	
2011	The Only Damage (aka The One Who Broke Your Heart)	Rock	Short film	
2011	The Last Match	Johnny	Short film	
2012	The Sapphires	Lt. Jensen		
2014	The Little Death	Sam		
2016	Halfway	Josh		
2017	Think Fast	Dan	Short film	
2017	OtherLife	Sam		
2019	Loves Me, Loves Me Not	Finn		
2020	Donor Baby	Bryan	Short film	
2021	Resort to Love	Barrington		
2024	The Neon Highway	Lloyd Collins		
2026	Allen	Petey		

==== As director / writer ====
Year	Title	Role	Notes	Ref
2017	Your Call Is Important to Us	Director / writer / producer / executive producer	Short film	
2020	The Bus to Birra Birra	Director / writer / producer	Short film	

=== Television ===
==== As actor ====
Year	Title	Role	Notes	Ref
2011	Underbelly: Razor	H.L. Jones	6 episodes	
2014	Parer's War	Lieutenant Johnny Lewin	TV film	
2014	Checked Out	Andy	TV film	
2016	Molly	Robbie Weekes	Miniseries; 2 episodes	
2016–2017	Offspring	Will Bowen	20 episodes	
2017	Major Crimes	Cliff Rainier	Episode: "Intersection"	
2017, 2018	True Story with Hamish & Andy	Wine guy 1 / Robbo	2 episodes	
2020	Criminal Minds	Parris	Episode: "Family Tree"	
2021	Insecure	Seth	2 episodes	
2023	Grey's Anatomy	Seth	Episode: "Cowgirls Don't Cry"	
2024	WondLa	Fiscian (voice)	Animated series, 2 episodes	
2024–2025	VeeFriends	Dynamic Dino (voice)	Animated series, 8 episodes	
2025	Hal & Harper	Adam	Miniseries, 1 episode	

==== As writer / director ====
Year	Title	Role	Notes	Ref
2020; 2021	Discover Indie Film	Director / writer	2 episodes	
2021	Discover Indie Film	Producer	1 episode	
2022–2025	Blippi & Meekah Adventures	Director	Web series, 27 episodes	
2023–2024	Meekah	Director	7 episodes	
2024	CocoMelon Classroom	Director	Web series	

== Theatre ==
Year	Title	Role	Notes	Ref
2007	The Cherry Orchard	Loparkin	WAAPA	
2007	Aftershocks	John	WAAPA, Perth	
2008	Cloudstreet	Fish Lamb	WAAPA, Perth	
2008	The Innocent Mistress	Sir Francis Wildlove	WAAPA, Perth	
2008	Noises Off	Fredrick Fellows	WAAPA, Perth	
2009	A Midsummer Night's Dream	Demetrius	Shakespeare WA, Perth	
2009	The Spook	Martin	Logos Productions	
2010	Macquarie	Francis Greenway	Riverside Theatres	
2010	As You Like It	Guitarist & Balladeer	Cleveland ST Theatre / Shakespeare Centre, Sydney	
2011	K.I.J.E.	Irving	Old Fitz Theatre, Sydney with Tamarama Rock Surfers	
2011	Summer of the Seventeenth Doll	Johnnie Dowd	Belvoir St Theatre, Sydney, Arts Centre Melbourne with Company B	
2012	Les Liaisons Dangereuses	Azolan	Wharf Theatre, Sydney with STC	
2016	Ruben Guthrie	Ruben Guthrie	Australian Theatre Company	
2019	Banging Denmark	Jake Newhouse / Gut DeWitt	Sydney Opera House with STC	

== Music ==
Release	Title	Artist	Type	Ref
2009	"New Wheel"	TJ Power	EP	
2012	"Traveller"	The Art of Grace	EP	

== Awards ==
Year	Work	Award	Category	Result	Ref
	TJ Power	WAAPA	Nigel Rideout Award for Most Exceptional Development in Training	Won	
2008	A Midsummer Night's Dream	Best Newcomer	WA Equity Guild Awards	Nominated	
2009	TJ Power	Australians in Film	AIF Heath Ledger Scholarship	Finalist	
2009	Charlie (short film)	West Australian Screen Awards	Best Actor	Nominated	
2009	Wasted on the Young	Sydney Film Festival		Honourable mention	
2014	The Little Death	AACTA Awards	Best Actor in a Supporting Role	Nominated	
2018	Your Call Is Important To Us	West End Film Festival	Best Film	Won	
2018	Your Call Is Important To Us	Canberra International Film Festival	Best Comedy	Won	
2018	Your Call Is Important To Us	Sherman Oaks Film Festival	Best Director – Short Film	Won	
2018	Your Call Is Important To Us	Sherman Oaks Film Festival	Best Short Film	Won	
2018	Your Call Is Important To Us	Sherman Oaks Film Festival	Outstanding Screenplay – Short Film	Won	
2018	Your Call Is Important To Us	Heart of Gold International Short Film Festival	Best Script	Won	
2018	Your Call Is Important To Us	Heart of Gold International Short Film Festival	Screener's Choice	Won	
2018	Your Call Is Important To Us	Heart of Gold International Short Film Festival	Best Australian Film	Nominated	
2018	Your Call Is Important To Us	Prescott Film Festival	Jury Prize – Best Narrative Short	Nominated	
2018	Your Call Is Important To Us	San Diego International Film Festival	Audience Award – Best Short Film	Won	
2018	Your Call Is Important To Us	Flickerfest	Best Australian Short Film	Nominated	
2018	Your Call Is Important To Us	The Reelgood Film Festival	Best Film	Nominated	
2020	The Bus to Birra Birra	Film Invasion LA	Best Short Film – Drama	Won	
2020	The Bus to Birra Birra	Film Invasion LA	Best Director – Short Film	Won	
2020	The Bus to Birra Birra	Film Invasion LA	Outstanding Screenplay	Won	
2020	The Bus to Birra Birra	Gold Coast Film Festival Screen Industry Gala Awards	People's Choice Award	Won	
2020	The Bus to Birra Birra	Santa Monica International Film Festival	Outstanding Screenplay	Honourable Mention	
