= Tunks Creek Bridge =

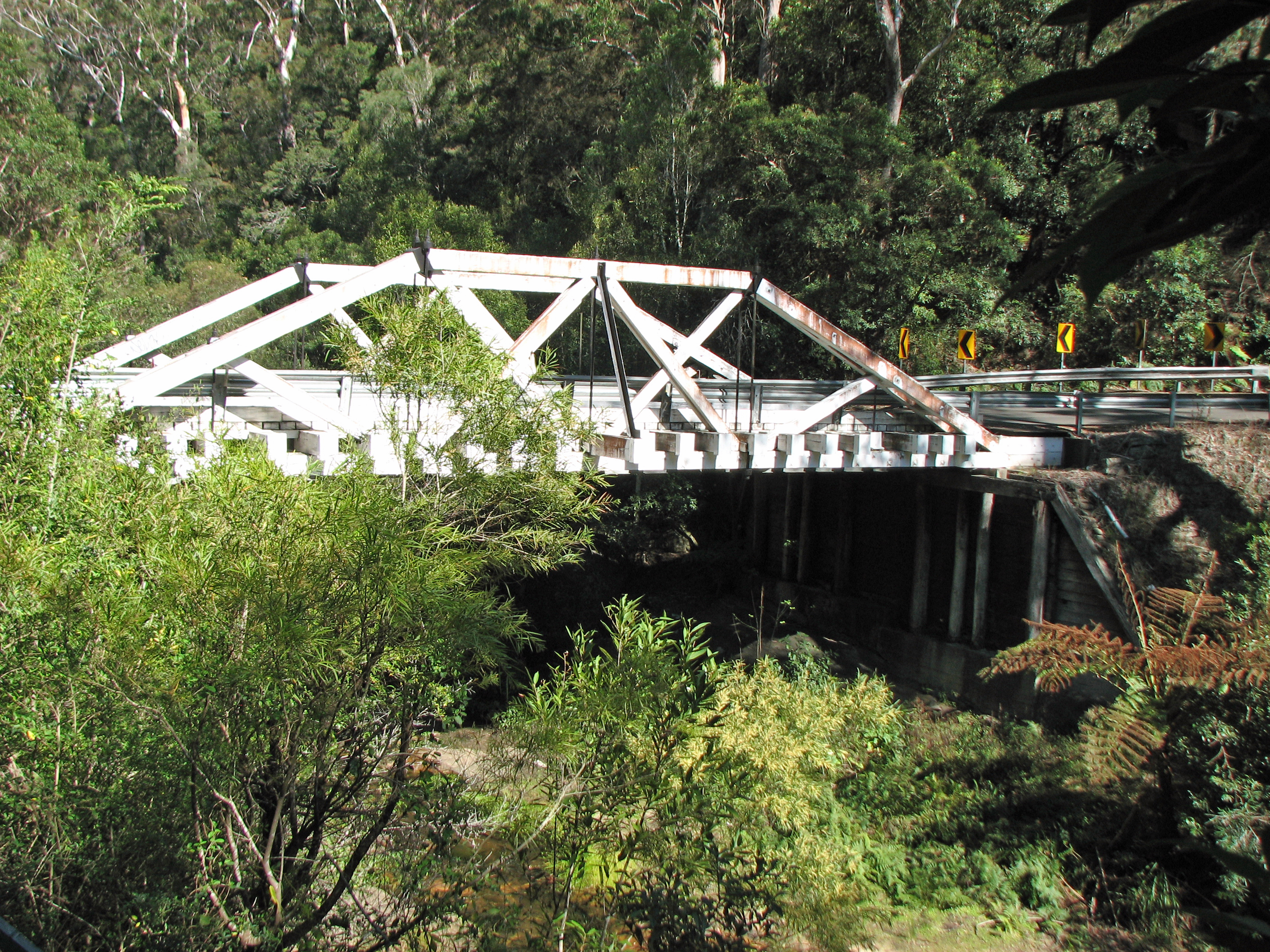
- Tunks Creek bridge, 2018
- Coordinates: 33°39′57″S 151°04′45″E
- Carries: Galston Road (Main Road 161)
- Crosses: Tunks Creek
- Locale: Galston, New South Wales, Australia
- Begins: Hornsby Heights (south)
- Ends: Galston (north)
- Official name: Tunks Creek bridge, Galston
- Other name(s): Bridge over Tunks (Pearces) Creek; Pearces Creek Bridge
- Owner: Transport for NSW

Characteristics
- Design: McDonald truss bridge
- Material: Timber
- Total length: 20 metres (65 ft)
- Width: 5 metres (15 ft)
- Longest span: 20 metres (65 ft)
- No. of spans: One
- No. of lanes: One

History
- Constructed by: NSW Department of Public Works
- Construction start: 1893
- Construction cost: A£265
- Opened: 1894

New South Wales Heritage Register
- Official name: Bridge over Tunks (Pearces) Creek; Pearces Creek Bridge
- Type: State heritage (built)
- Designated: 20 June 2000
- Reference no.: 1478
- Type: Road Bridge
- Category: Transport – Land
- Builders: NSW Department of Public Works

The Tunks Creek Bridge is a heritage-listed timber truss road bridge that carries Galston Road (Main Road 161) across Tunks Creek, in Galston, New South Wales, Australia. The bridge spans Tunks Creek in the valley of the Galston Gorge. The road through the gorge provides a link between Hornsby Heights and Galston, suburbs of Sydney. The bridge is also known as the Bridge over Tunks (Pearces) Creek and Pearces Creek Bridge. The bridge is owned by Transport for NSW. It was added to the New South Wales State Heritage Register on 20 June 2000.

== History ==
Timber truss road bridges were extensively used in New South Wales because of the high quality of local hardwoods and the shortage of steel during the early decades of settlement of the state. The timber truss was highly developed for bridges in New South Wales, perhaps more so than anywhere else in the world at that time. The McDonald truss is a significant evolutionary link in the development of timber road bridges in New South Wales and has three standard span lengths, 20 metres (65 ft), 23 metres (75 ft) and 27 metres (90 ft).

== Description ==
The Galston Bridge is a single-span timber McDonald truss bridge located on Galston Road. It was built between 1893 and 1894 by the NSW Department of Public Works and crosses Tunks Creek in Galston Gorge, east of Hornsby. At 20 metres (65 ft), the bridge is the shortest of all the remaining timber truss bridges in NSW. The bridge is supported at each end on timber abutments which also retain the road earthworks. The bridge width is 5 metres (15 ft) between kerbs and at both ends the approach road turns sharply at right angles. This bridge will be preserved without upgrading with modern materials as it does not have to carry heavy loads due to the winding and scenic Galston Road having a load limit.

The bridge has only one lane, with give-way signs on both ends of the bridge, so that traffic already on the bridge is given priority. The bridge was built at a cost of A£265.

=== Modifications and dates ===
The following modifications and changes have been made to the bridge:

- 1958 – centre pile replaced.
- 1961–1963 – some cross girders and truss members replaced. Two timber piles and short timber headstock erected against Hornsby side abutment.
- 1978 – replacement of some girders, decking and steel plating.
- c. 1980 – some struts and deck planks replaced.

=== Condition ===
The original condition assessment, as at July 2002, was 'currently in good condition following major repairs' between November 2001 and February 2002. In April 2009 the condition was updated to 'good'.

== Heritage listing ==
The Tunks Creek bridge was listed on the New South Wales State Heritage Register on 20 June 2000.

As of April 2019, of the 91 McDonald truss bridges built in New South Wales, the Galson Bridge is one of five remaining.

Timber truss road bridges have played a significant role in the expansion and improvement of the NSW road network. Prior to the bridges being built, river crossings were often dangerous in times of rain, which caused bulk freight movement to be prohibitively expensive for most agricultural and mining produce. Only the high priced wool clip of the time was able to carry the costs and inconvenience imposed by the generally inadequate river crossings that often existed prior to the trusses construction.

Timber truss bridges were preferred by the Public Works Department from the mid 19th to the early 20th century because they were relatively cheap to construct, and used mostly local materials. The financially troubled governments of the day applied pressure to the Public Works Department to produce as much road and bridge work for as little cost as possible, using local materials. This condition effectively prohibited the use of iron and steel, as these, prior to the construction of the steel works at Newcastle in the early 20th century, had to be imported from England. A series of five timber truss bridges were used. These included 1865 Old PWD, 1884 McDonald, 1894 Allan, 1899 de Burgh and 1905 Dare. Each was a technical improvement on its predecessor.

Timber truss bridges, and timber bridges generally were so common that NSW was known to travellers as the "timber bridge state".

The bridge at Pearce's Creek was built in response to agitation for a new road to shorten the distance to market for fruit growers in the Galston area. This road would not be completed until 1895. It was also used as part of a depression relief scheme to provide work for the poor during the depression of the early 1890s. Not all believed a road up the steep grades of the gorge would be successful and believed the construction of bridges for it to be a waste of time and money. Nevertheless, bridge construction went ahead and tenders for Pearces Creek Bridge together with the nearby Berowra Creek Bridge on the Hornsby-Galston Road were called for on 5 August 1892. Thirteen tenders were received. The contract was won by Francis Boland whose tender of just over 2651 pounds was the lowest of the thirteen received. Work commenced in February 1893 and was completed by early 1894.

== Gallery ==
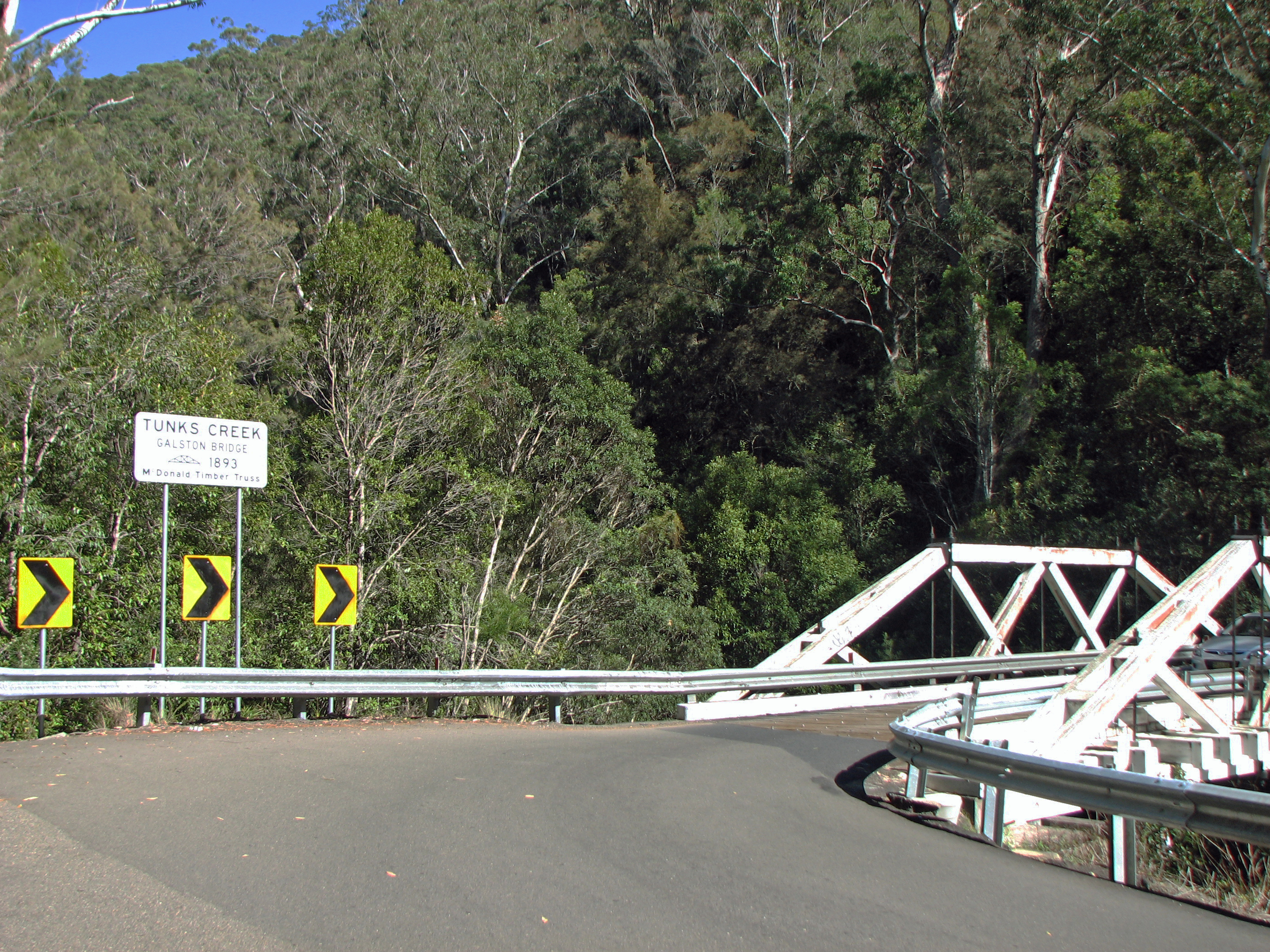
Tunks Creek Bridge

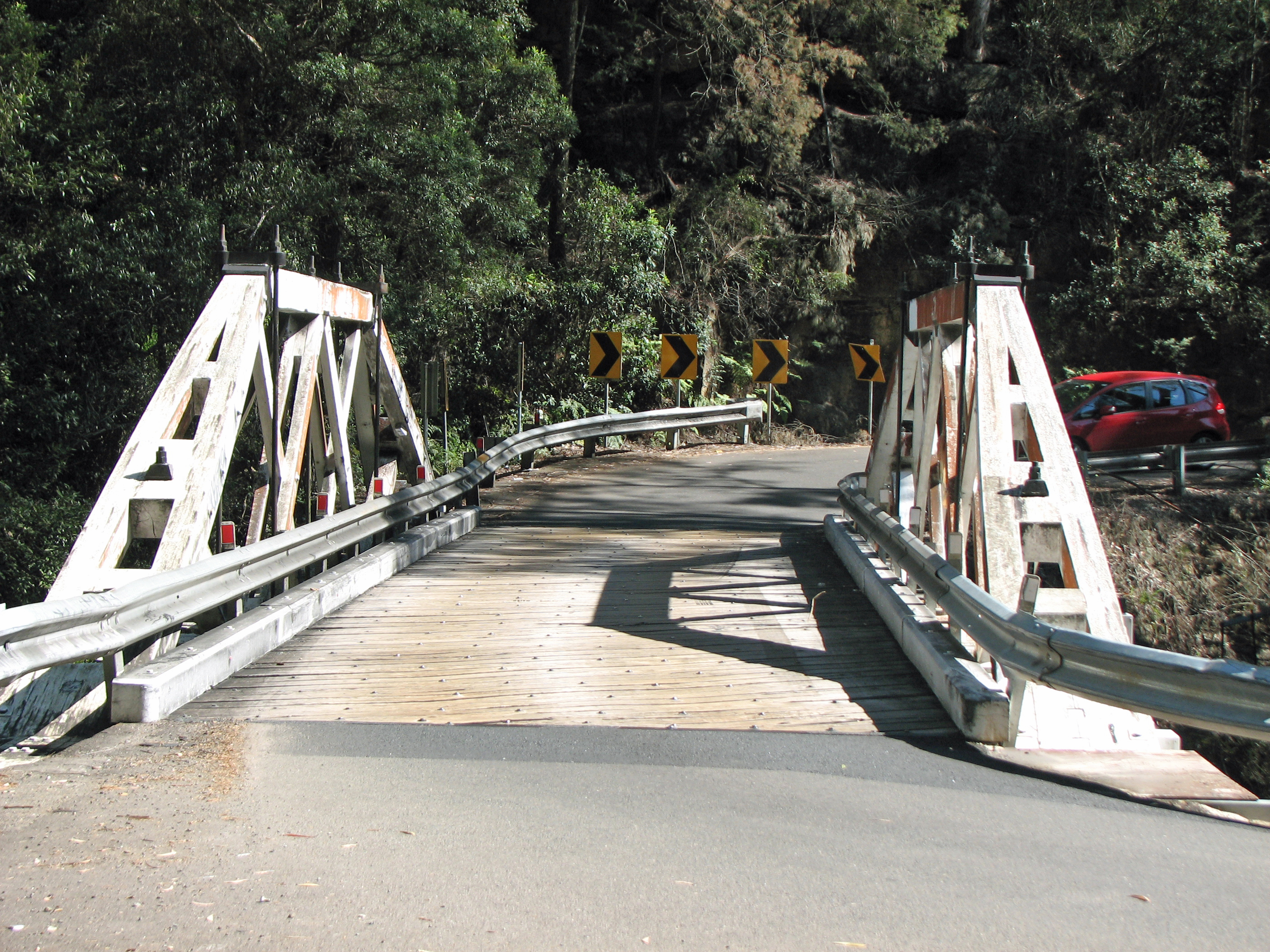
Tunks Creek Bridge

== See also ==
- List of bridges in Sydney
- Great North Walk
