= Marramarra National Park =

National park in New South Wales, Australia

- IUCN category II (national park)
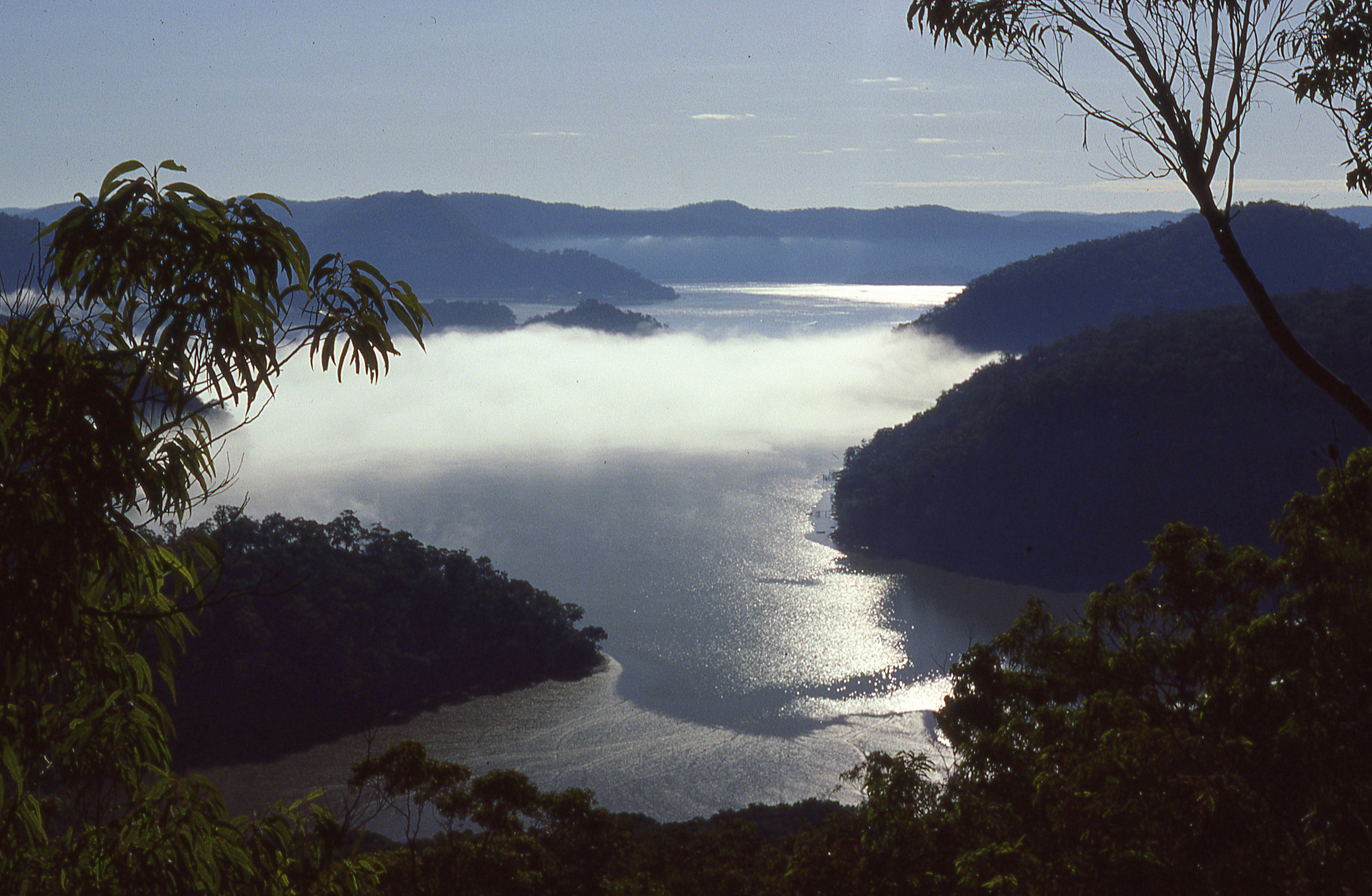
- View of Berowra Creek from Marramarra National Park

- Location within New South Wales
- Location: New South Wales
- Nearest city: Sydney
- Coordinates: 33°31′30″S 151°03′28″E
- Area: 117.85 km^{2} (45.50 sq mi)
- Established: 28 December 1979
- Governing body: NSW National Parks & Wildlife Service
- Website: Official website

Marramarra National Park is a protected national park in the Hawkesbury region of northwestern Sydney, New South Wales, in eastern Australia. The 11,785-hectare (29,120-acre) national park is situated approximately 40 kilometres (25 mi) northwest of the Sydney central business district.

== Description ==
The park is bounded by the Hawkesbury River in the north; Berowra Creek in the east; and private land to the south and west. The national park may be accessed from Wisemans Ferry via the Old Northern Road or from Hornsby via the Galston Road through the Galston Gorge.

The park is administered by Ku-ring-gai Chase National Park. It offers bushwalkers a wide range of environments, from the mangrove communities along Marramarra Creek to the drier, sclerophyll scrub along the ridges. Access is provided predominantly by fire trails and service roads, frequently alongside power lines, with no dedicated walking tracks.

Marramarra was a traditional area for the Aboriginal people of Darug. There are still places that testify to their traditional life here. Rock engravings, cave art, grinding grooves, scarred trees and other stone arrangements are part of this national park.

== Gallery ==
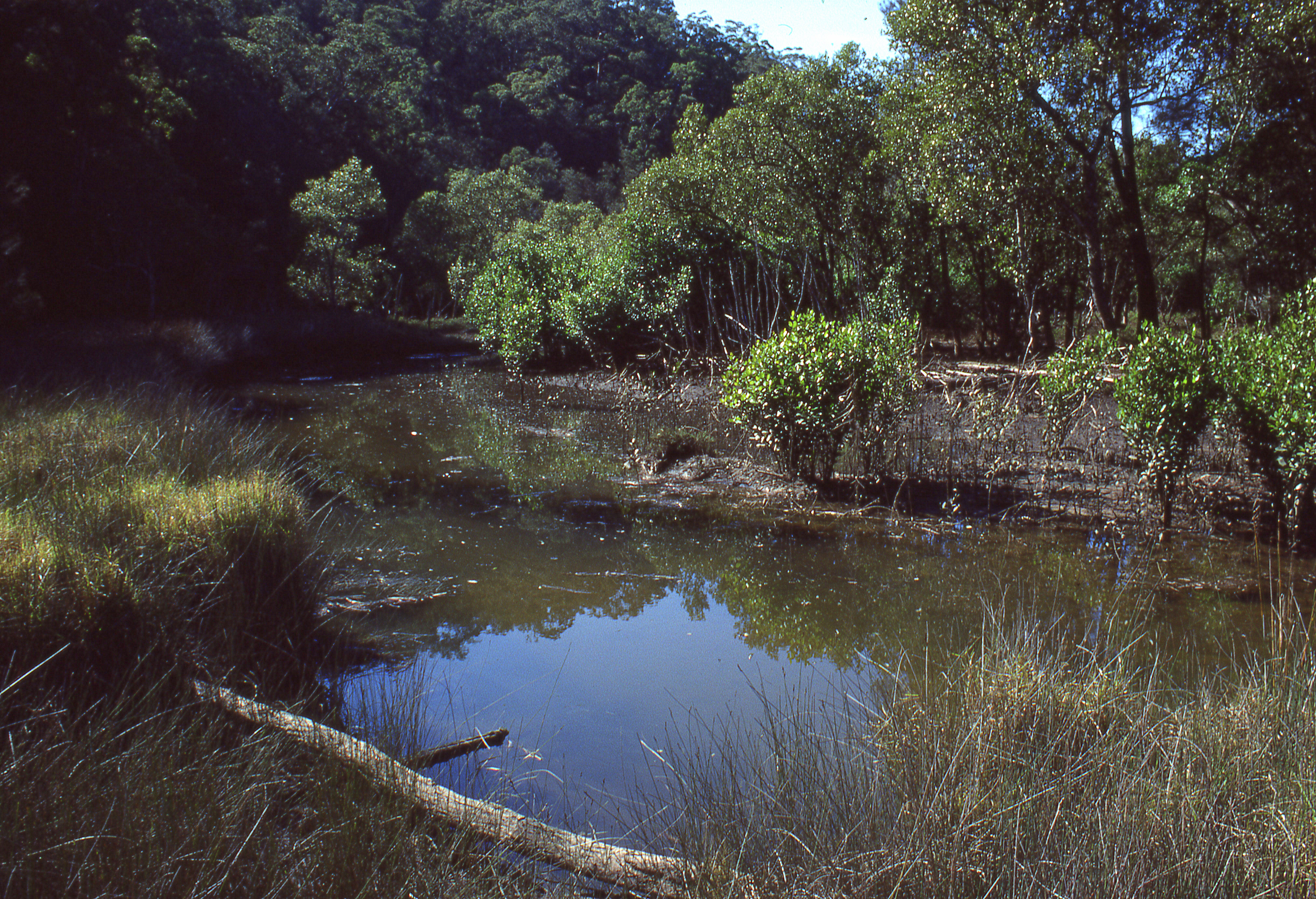
Cobah Creek

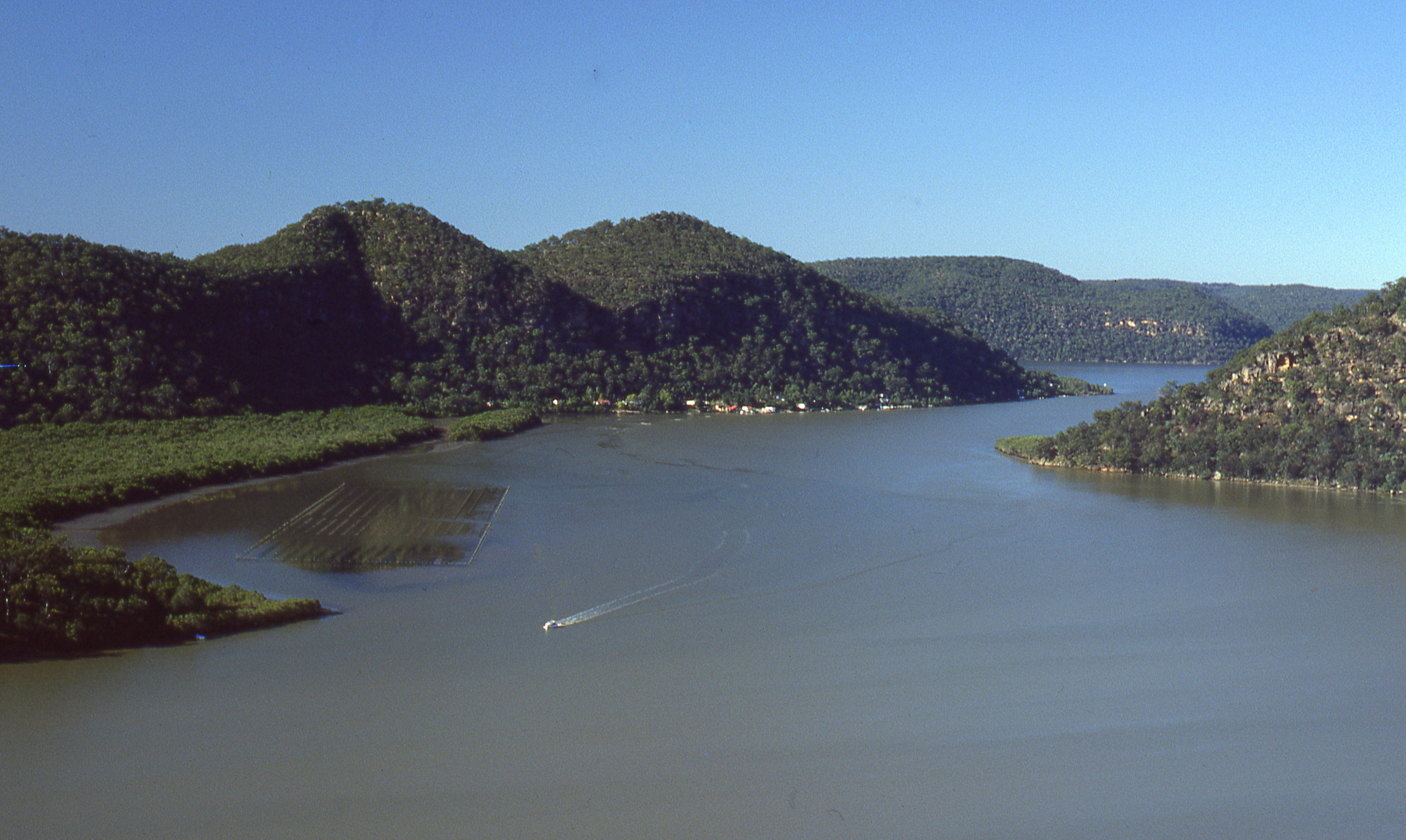
View of the Hawkesbury River from the northern ridges of the national park

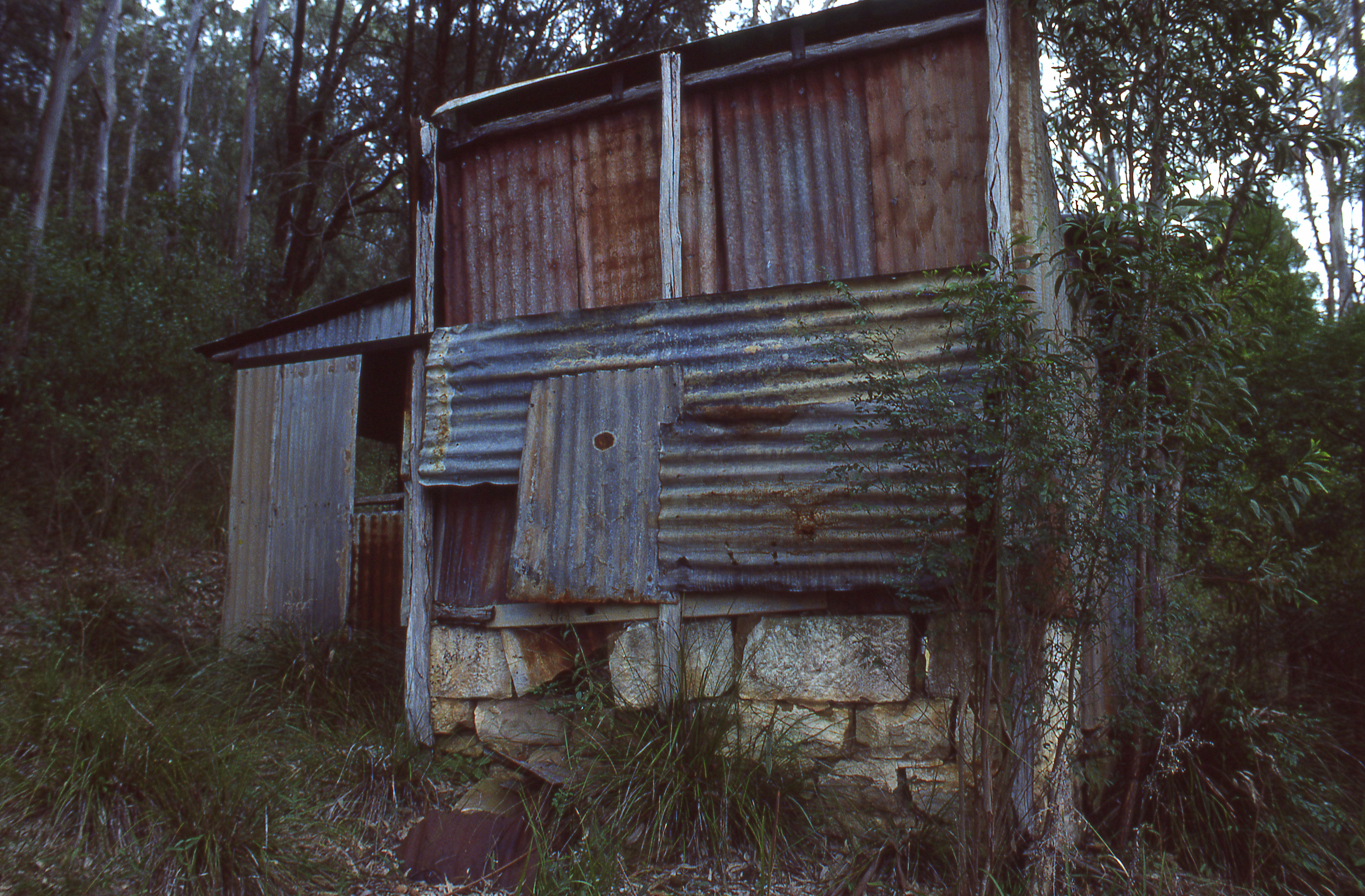
A hut in Big Bay

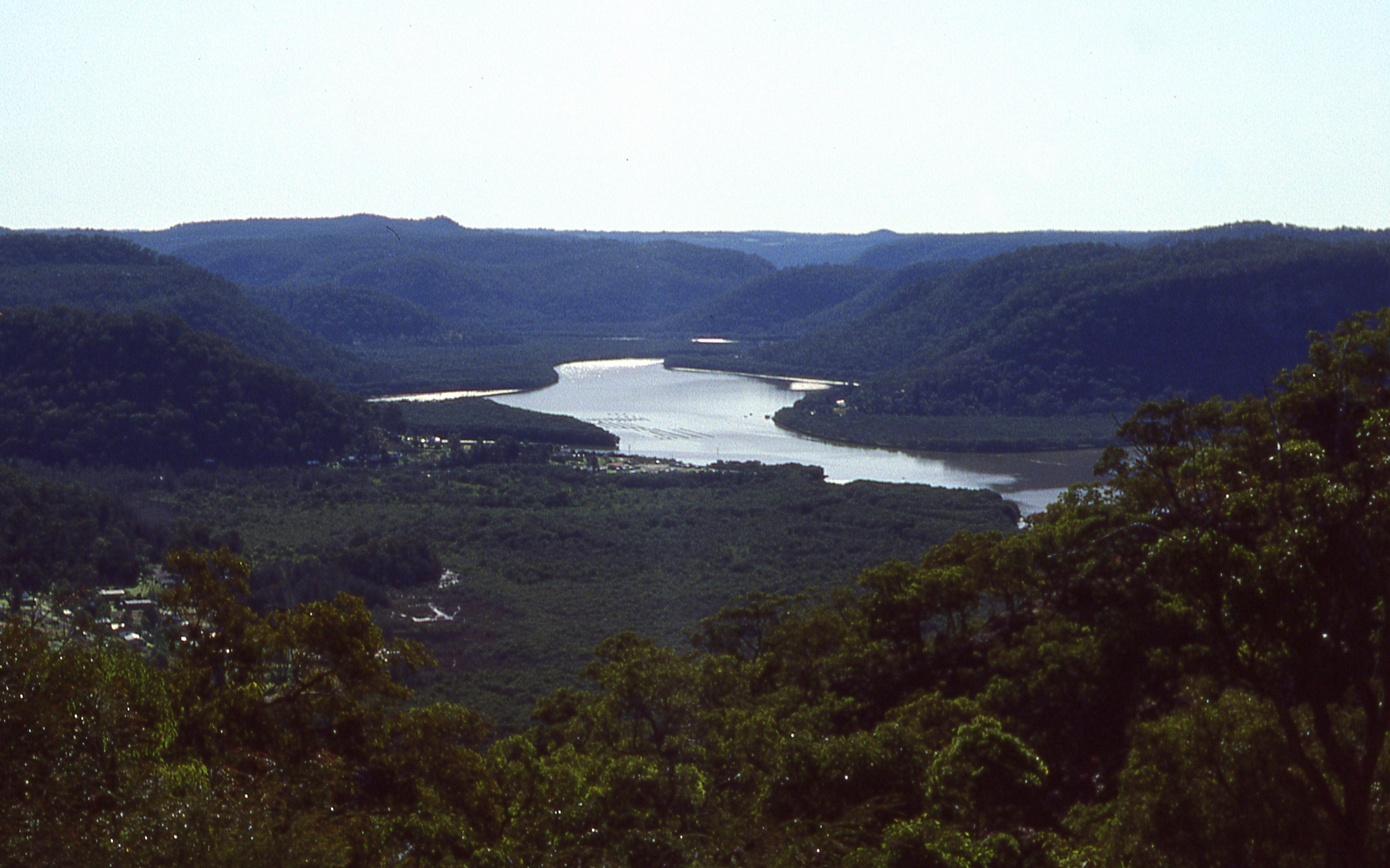
View of Mangrove Creek from the northern part of the national park

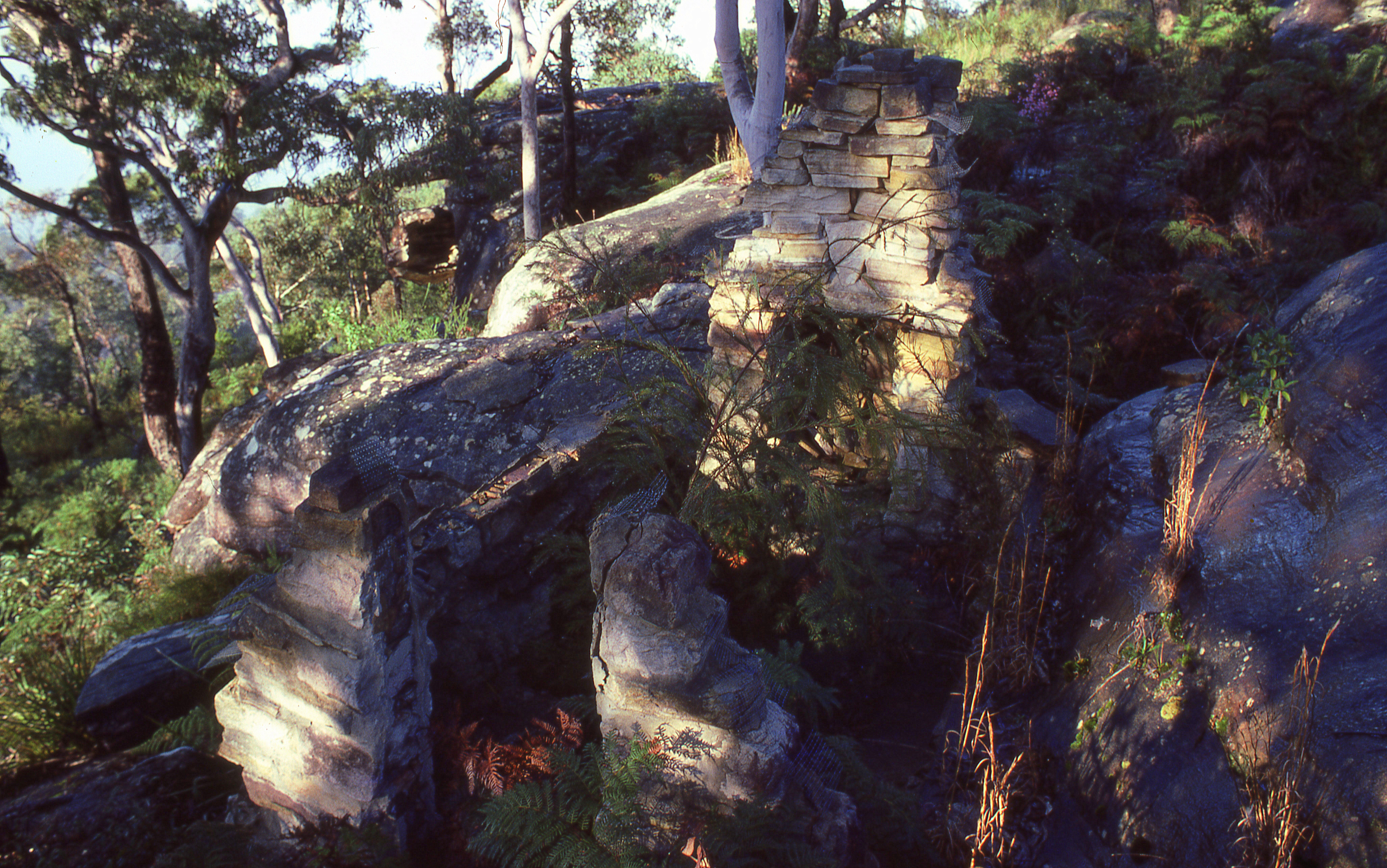
Ruins along the northern ridge of the national park, parallel to the Hawkesbury River

== Bibliography ==
- Treks in New South Wales, Neil Paton (Kangaroo Press) 1986, ISBN 0-86417-079-3

== See also ==
- Protected areas of New South Wales
