= Solitaire (Eskridge novel) =

2002 novel by Kelley Eskridge

- Cover of the 2002 EOS/Harper Collins first edition of Solitaire. Cover illustration by Bruce Jensen.
- Author: Kelley Eskridge
- Language: English
- Genre: Science fiction
- Publisher: EOS/Harper Collins (2002, 2004), Small Beer Press (January 2011)
- Publication date: 2002
- Publication place: United States
- Media type: Print (Paperback), Electronic (E-book)
- Pages: 368
- Awards: New York Times Notable Book 2002, Borders Books Original Voices Selection, Borders Books Best of Year Selection, Nebula Award finalist 2002, Gaylactic Spectrum Awards finalist 2003, Endeavour Award finalist 2003
- ISBN: 978-0-06-008857-6
- OCLC: 49386232
- Dewey Decimal: 813/.6$221
- LC Class: PS3605.S75 S65 2002
- Website: Small Beer Press

Solitaire is a novel written by Kelley Eskridge, published by EOS/HarperCollins in 2002 and 2004 and republished by Small Beer Press in 2011.

The novel served as the basis for the 2017 feature film OtherLife co-written by Eskridge, directed by Ben C. Lucas, and starring Jessica De Gouw.

== Plot summary ==
Jackal Segura was born to a life rich with responsibility and privilege and will soon become part of the global administration, sponsored by the huge corporation that houses, feeds, employs, and protects her and everyone she loves. However, just as she discovers that everything she's been brought up to believe is a lie, she is convicted of murder. Grief-stricken and alone, she is sentenced to years of virtual solitary confinement compressed into a few months. When finally released, branded and despised, she struggles to rebuild her life, love, and soul in a strange place called Solitaire.

== Film adaptation ==
The 2017 feature film OtherLife is loosely based on the novel Solitaire. The film was written by Gregory Widen, Ben C. Lucas, and Kelley Eskridge, directed by Ben C. Lucas, and stars Jessica De Gouw. The film premiered at the Sydney Film Festival in June 2017 and was released on Netflix on 15 October 2017.

The film's plot, based "very, very loosely" on the novel, presents Ren Amari as a high-tech researcher who develops a form of biological virtual reality. When her partner insists she license it for virtual solitary confinement, which she strongly feels is unethical, she fights to retain control of her invention.

== Reception ==
Gerald Jonas in The New York Times Book Review wrote that, "Eskridge's evocation of Jackal's time in high-tech solitary confinement is a stylistic and psychological tour de force. The horrors she confronts, the defenses she mounts, the things she learns are treated with a painful but bracing clarity..."

In The Seattle Times, Nisi Shawl wrote, "Eskridge's portrait of executives balancing corporate responsibilities and personal loyalties in the midst of Machiavellian machinations rings crisp and true. The account of Jackal's apparent abandonment by Ko, her confinement, her chillingly visceral struggle with isolation-induced madness, and her ultimate transformation from self-centeredness to self-sufficiency is almost completely convincing."

A reviewer for Publishers Weekly demurred, "This near-future debut novel tries hard, but doesn't quite amalgamate its ambitious themes."

== Awards and nominations ==
- New York Times Notable Book 2002
- Borders Books Original Voices Selection
- Borders Books Best of Year Selection
- Nebula Award finalist 2002
- Gaylactic Spectrum Awards finalist 2003
- Endeavour Award finalist 2003
