= Sunny Nights =

- Genre: Comedy drama
- Created by: Nick Keetch; Ty Freer
- Written by: Nick Keetch; Ty Freer; Marieke Hardy; Lally Katz; Clare Sladden; Niki Aken
- Directed by: Trent O'Donnell
- Starring: Will Forte; D'Arcy Carden; Rachel House; Jessica De Gouw; Ra Chapman; Willie Mason
- Opening theme: "Who Loves the Sun" by Matt Berninger and Rosanne Cash
- Country of origin: Australia
- Original language: English
- No. of seasons: 1
- No. of episodes: 8

Production
- Producer: Bridget Callow-Wright
- Cinematography: Tyson Perkins
- Editors: Gabriel Dowrick; Danielle Boesenberg
- Running time: 44–52 minutes
- Production companies: Jungle Entertainment; Echo Lake Entertainment

Original release
- Network: Stan
- Release: 26 December 2025

Sunny Nights is an Australian comedy drama series for Stan. It was created by Nick Keetch and Ty Freer. The series follows siblings Martin and Vicki Marvin, an American brother-sister duo who relocate to Sydney hoping to establish a spray tan business. They find themselves entangled with all the wrong people, trying to stay alive, out of jail, and in the black. The series premiered on 26 December 2025.

At the 2026 Screen Music Awards, music by Matteo Zingales was nominated for Best Music for a Television Comedy.

== Plot ==
As two siblings attempt to start a new spray tan business venture in Sydney, they both stumble into the criminal underworld, trying to stay out of prison, stay alive and keep their business running.

== Cast ==
On 10 July 2024 the cast of the series were announced with Will Forte and D'Arcy Carden announced as the two lead characters with former Australian rugby league player Willie Mason making his acting debut in the series.

- Will Forte as Martin Marvin
- D'Arcy Carden as Vicki Marvin
- Rachel House as Mony
- Jessica De Gouw as Susi
- Miritana Hughes as Kash
- Megan Wilding as Nova
- George Mason as Dreadlock Pete
- Ra Chapman as Joyce
- Matuse as Dentist Dave
- Willie Mason as Terry Torres

== Production ==
On 12 March 2024, Stan had announced a slate of original dramas with Sunny Nights in that announcement alongside Critical Incident and Invisible Boys. On 13 March, Screen Australia announced that the series had secured funding.

On 11 July 2024, it was announced that the series had begun filming in New South Wales in the Sydney area.

On 22 January 2025 the series was selected to be shown at Berlinale Series Market alongside n00b.

== Release ==
The series premiered on Stan on 26 December 2025. The series was released on Hulu on 11 March 2026.
