= Megan Wilding =

Australian writer and actor

Megan Wilding is an Australian writer and actor. She claims Australian Aboriginal heritage as a descendant of the Gamilaroi nation.

== Education ==
Wilding is a graduate of the Western Australian Academy of Performing Arts. She is a Gamilaroi woman a playwright, director and actor.

== Actor ==
She appeared in the comedy series Sunny Nights for Stan, the crime mystery series Mystery Road: Origin for ABC TV, and the sketch comedy series The Moth Effect for Amazon Prime.

== Writer ==
Wilding wrote the play Game. Set. Match. and played Ray, the female lead, in its premiere at the Malthouse Theatre, Melbourne.

== Works ==
Year	Title	Role	Notes
2017	A Little Piece of Ash	writer	drama
2018	Blackie Blackie Brown: The Traditional Owner of Death	actor	drama
2023	Would, Could, Should	writer	poetry
2023	Darkness	writer	drama
2023	Caesar	writer	drama
2026	Game. Set. Match	writer and actor	drama

== Recognition ==
- 2017 recipient of the Balnaves Aboriginal and Torres Strait Islander Fellowship.
- 2021 Griffin Award for New Australian Playwriting.
