= Kelley Eskridge =

American writer

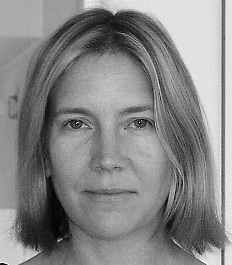
- Eskridge in 2002 photo by Nicola Griffith
- Born: September 21, 1960 (age 65); Florida, U.S.
- Education: St. Paul's School; Northwestern University; University of South Florida (BA)
- Occupations: Novelist; short story author; essayist
- Writing career
- Period: 1990–present
- Genres: Science fiction, Slipstream
- Website: kelleyeskridge.com

Kelley Eskridge (born September 21, 1960) is an American writer of fiction, non-fiction and screenplays. Her work is generally regarded as speculative fiction and is associated with the more literary edge of the category, as well as with the category of slipstream fiction.

== Early life and education ==
Eskridge was born in Florida on September 21, 1960. She attended St. Paul's School in Concord, New Hampshire, Northwestern University, and the University of South Florida where she earned a B.A. degree in Theatre Performance.

== Career ==
Eskridge attended the Clarion Writers Workshop in 1988 where she met her future wife, English novelist Nicola Griffith. Eskridge has published short fiction and essays since 1990. Her story "And Salome Danced" received the $11,000 Astraea Prize and was nominated for the James Tiptree Jr. Award in 1995, and her story "Alien Jane" was a finalist for the Nebula Award for Best Short Story, also in 1995. Alien Jane also received a TV adaptation on the short-lived Sci-Fi Channel Series Welcome to Paradox.

Her first collection of short fiction, Dangerous Space, was published in 2007; the title novella "Dangerous Space" was a Nebula Award finalist in 2009.

Her first novel Solitaire was published in 2002 by HarperCollins Eos. Solitaire is character-driven science fiction set in a near-future corporate state. It was a New York Times Notable Book, a Borders Original Voices selection, and was a finalist for the Nebula, Endeavour, and Spectrum awards. Solitaire was the basis for the 2017 feature film OtherLife co-written by Eskridge, directed by Ben C. Lucas, and starring Jessica De Gouw.

Eskridge has been a full-time writer, screenwriter and independent editor/writing coach. She previously worked in a series of corporate positions, most recently as Vice President of Project Management at Wizards of the Coast. She served on the board of the Clarion West Writers Workshop from late 2009 to 2014, and was board chair from 2010 to 2013. She taught at Clarion West in 2007.

Eskridge is the co-founder (with Nicola Griffith) and managing partner of Sterling Editing (established 2009) with an international client list of established and emerging writers.

Eskridge is the creator of the Humans At Work program to help new managers learn people management skills. Management guru Bob I. Sutton (author of The No Asshole Rule) quoted Eskridge's views on management in his book Good Boss, Bad Boss (Chapter 1).

== Personal life ==
Eskridge's commitment ceremony to Nicola Griffith in Atlanta on September 4, 1993 was announced in The Atlanta Journal-Constitution, perhaps the first same-sex commitment announcement the paper had published. They were legally married twenty years later on September 4, 2013 in Seattle, Washington where they live today.

== Awards and honors ==
- Astraea Prize, 1993 for "And Salome Danced"
- Year's Best Fantasy and Horror, 1995 for "Strings"
- New York Times Notable Book, 2002 for Solitaire
- Borders Original Voices selection, 2002
- Borders Best of Year Selection
- Endeavour Award, 2003 for Solitaire
- Spectrum Award Finalist, 2003 for Solitaire
- Tiptree Prize Finalist/Honor List, 2007 for "Dangerous Space", 1998 for "The Eye of the Storm", 1995 for "And Salome Danced"
- Nebula Award Finalist, 2009 for "Dangerous Space", 2003 for Solitaire, 1996 for "Alien Jane"
- Writer Guest of Honor (with Nicola Griffith) at Westercon 66, 2013

== Bibliography ==
=== Novels ===
- Solitaire (2002). USA: HarperCollins Eos. September 2002 (hc), February 2004 (tp).
  - Solitaire (2011). Small Beer Press.

=== Collection ===
- Dangerous Space (2007). USA: Aqueduct Press.

=== Short ===
- "The Hum of Human Cities" (1990). Pulphouse: A Hardback Magazine, Vol. 9.
- "Somewhere Down the Diamondback Road" (1993). Pulphouse: A Hardback Magazine, Issue 15.
- "Strings" (1994). The Magazine of Fantasy & Science Fiction.
- "And Salome Danced" (1994). Little Deaths, Ellen Datlow, ed. UK: Orion.
- "Alien Jane" (1995). Century Magazine, Vol. 1.
- "The Eye of the Storm" (1998). Sirens and Other Daemon Lovers, Ellen Datlow, ed. USA: HarperPrism.
- "Eye of the Storm" (2012). Beyond Binary, Lee Mandelo, ed. United States Lethe Press

=== Essay ===
- "Identity and Desire" (essay, 1999). Women of Other Worlds, Tess Williams and Helen Merrick, eds. Australia: University of Western Australia Press.
- "As We Mean to Go On," with Nicola Griffith (essay, 2005). Bookmark Now: Writing in Unreaderly Times, Kevin Smokler, ed. USA: Basic Books.
