= Halfway (2016 film) =

- Directed by: Ben Caird
- Written by: Ben Caird
- Produced by: Jonny Paterson
- Starring: Quinton Aaron; Jeffrey DeMunn; Amy Pietz
- Cinematography: Benjamin Thomas
- Edited by: Karel van Bellingen
- Music by: Miles Mosley
- Production company: JP International Productions
- Distributed by: Film Sales Company
- Release date: April 20, 2016 (Dallas)
- Running time: 103 minutes
- Country: United States
- Language: English

Halfway is a 2016 American drama film written and directed by Ben Caird and starring Quinton Aaron. The film is Caird's directorial debut and Aaron served as an executive producer. On November 1, 2017, 'Halfway' was nominated for a British Independent Film Award in the Discovery Award category.

== Cast ==
- Quinton Aaron as Byron
- Jeffrey DeMunn as Walt
- Marcus Henderson as Paulie
- Gillian Zinser as Eliza
- Amy Pietz as Beth
- T.J. Power as Josh
- Billy Aaron Brown as Sean

== Production ==
According to Aaron, "We shot the movie over four weeks on the Lepeska family farm in Montfort, Wisconsin." Aaron confirmed in another interview, "The writer and director, Ben Caird, his family farm is actually where we shot it at. Ben's British, but his mother is from Wisconsin, and their family farm was the farm we used in the movie in Montfort. So that's what brought us out here." Early in development, Edi Gathegi was to have portrayed Paulie.

== Release ==
Halfway made its worldwide premiere on April 20, 2016 at the Dallas International Film Festival. On June 12, 2016, it was announced that the worldwide sales rights to Halfway have been acquired by the Film Sales Company.

A screening of the film was shown at the 16th Wildwood Film Festival in Appleton, Wisconsin on March 10, 2017.

The film made its exclusive premiere on the Urban Movie Channel on April 21, 2017.

== See also ==
- Cinema of Australia
