= Hornsby Heights =

- Suburb
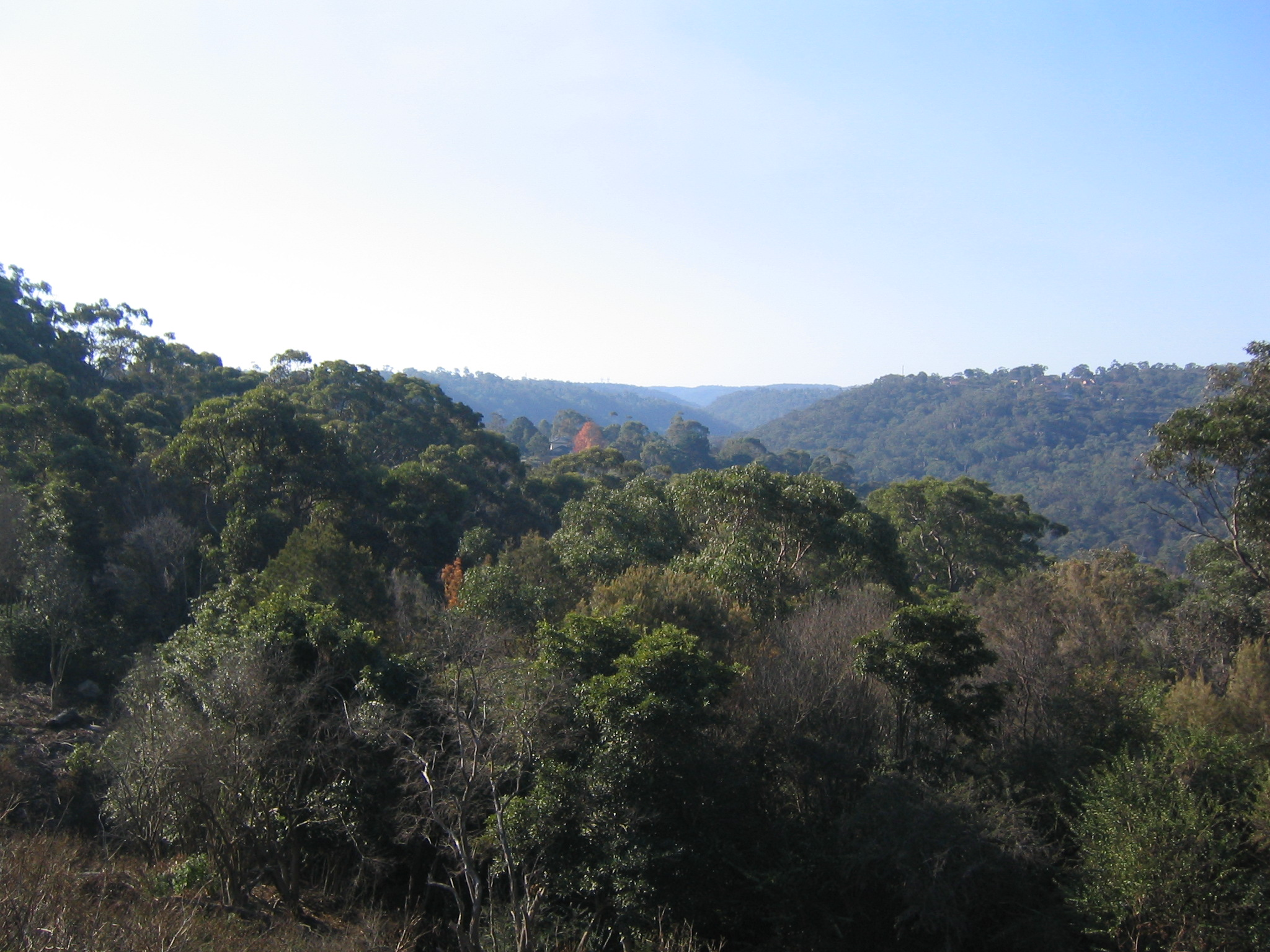
- Hornsby Heights viewed from Rofe Park

- Interactive map of Hornsby Heights
- Country: Australia
- State: New South Wales
- City: Sydney
- LGA: Hornsby Shire
- Location: 26 km (16 mi) from Sydney CBD

Government
  - State electorate: Hornsby
  - Federal division: Berowra

Area
  - Total: 10.3 km^{2} (4.0 sq mi)
- Elevation: 192 m (630 ft)

Population
  - Total: 6,354 (2021 census)
  - Density: 616.9/km^{2} (1,598/sq mi)
- Postcode: 2077
Suburbs around Hornsby Heights
Galston	Berrilee	Mount Ku-ring-gai
Galston	Hornsby Heights	Mount Colah
Dural	Hornsby	Asquith

Hornsby Heights is a suburb of Northern Sydney, in the state of New South Wales, Australia. Hornsby Heights is located 26 kilometres north-west of the Sydney central business district, in the local government area of Hornsby Shire. The suburb is often referred to as part of the Upper North Shore.

Hornsby Heights lies predominately on the high narrow ridges of the Hornsby Plateau above the eastern side of Galston Gorge and the Berowra Valley National Park which makes up the suburb's rugged and beautiful northern, western and much of its eastern boundaries. On the southern and southeastern side of the suburb, the boundaries meet with Hornsby and to a lesser extent, Asquith. The road entry to Hornsby Heights can only be made via Galston Rd through Hornsby from the south or from the north-west via Galston Gorge.

The main characteristics of the area are its leafy bushland setting and the many short avenues leading to quiet cul de sacs branching off the 2 main roads, Galston and Sommerville Rds. The steepness of some of its streets are also a feature, as many have been cut into the surrounding valleys to maximise the available land close to the ridge edges.

== History ==
The name Hornsby is derived from Convict-turned-Constable Samuel Henry Horne, who took part in the apprehension of bushrangers Dalton and MacNamara on 22 June 1830. In return he was granted land which he named Hornsby Place.

== Population ==
At the 2021 census, there were 6,354 residents in Hornsby Heights. The most common ancestries were English 36.7%, Australian 33.6%, Irish 10.3%, Scottish 10.0%, and Chinese 8.3%. 67.8% of people were born in Australia. The next most common countries of birth were England 5.6%, China 3.7%, India 2.4%, New Zealand 1.7%, and South Africa 1.4%. 77.7% of people spoke only English at home. Other languages spoken at home included Mandarin at 4.5%, the most common responses for religion were No Religion 41.5%, Catholic 18.9% and Anglican 14.6%.

== Flora and fauna ==
Bird and animal life abound in the suburb, with many species being regular visitors to resident's homes. Kangaroos, wallabies, common ringtail possums and echidnas abound in the mammalian world, while rainbow lorikeets, noisy miners and sulphur-crested cockatoos are some of the most common birds.

The flora is rich and typical of the Australian native bushland in the Hornsby area.

== Parks ==
Hornsby Heights is dominated by parks. The suburb is encircled by the Berowra Valley Regional Park. Parks within Hornsby Heights are Rofe Park and Montview Oval. Rofe Park is located on Galston Road and has a leash-free dog area. Crosslands Reserve, a camping and picnic area is at the northern end of Hornsby Heights. Hornsby Heights also contains small parks such as Ulolo, off Galston Road, and Leonora Close Park, off Sommerville Road. Many of these can be found around various quiet streets.

The Galston Gorge to Crosslands section of the Great North Walk runs along the western boundary of Hornsby Heights.

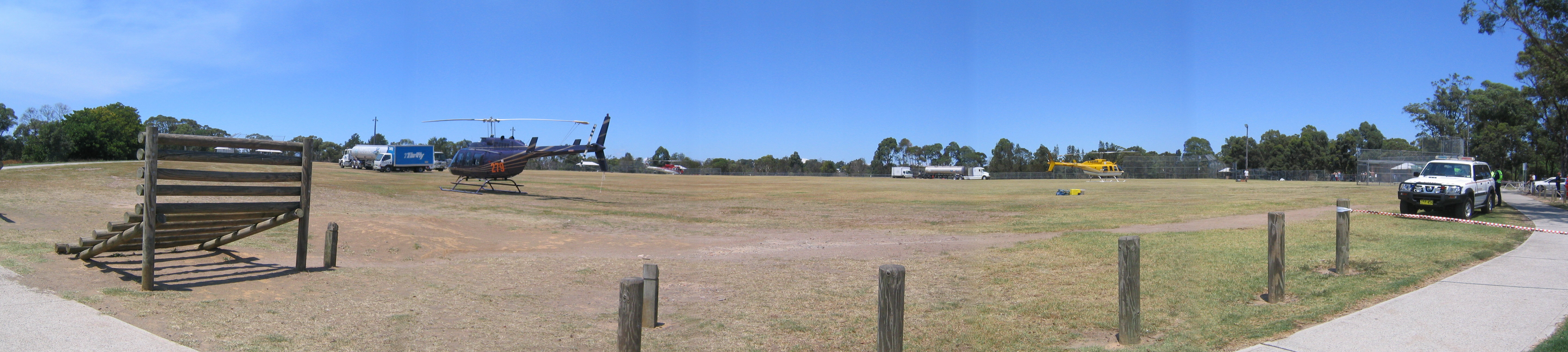
Rofe Park, being used as a helicopter base during a bushfire

== Transport ==
Hornsby Heights is serviced by bus route number 596, operated by CDC NSW. The bus runs in a loop from Hornsby railway station. The loop takes in Galston Road, Somerville Road and the area around Montview Oval (Montview Parade and McKay Road).

== Schools ==
Schools in Hornsby Heights include Hornsby Heights Public School and Hornsby North Public School. Hornsby North Public School sits on the boundary between Hornsby and Hornsby Heights. Hornsby Heights Public School celebrated its 50th birthday in 2011.

== Churches ==
Saint Luke's Anglican Church is located at 155 Galston Road.

Hornsby Heights lies within the Ku-ring-gai Chase Catholic parish.

Hornsby Heights Baptist Church is at 110A Galston Road, next to the shopping centre.

== Culture ==
=== Clubs ===
- Hornsby Heights Sports Club
- 1st Hornsby Heights Scout Group
- St Luke's Railway Modellers Club

=== Community groups ===
The NSW Rural Fire Service's Hornsby & Hornsby Heights Brigades are located at 143 Galston Road in Hornsby Heights.
