= Galston Congregational Church Pipe Organ =

Galston Uniting Church Pipe Organ
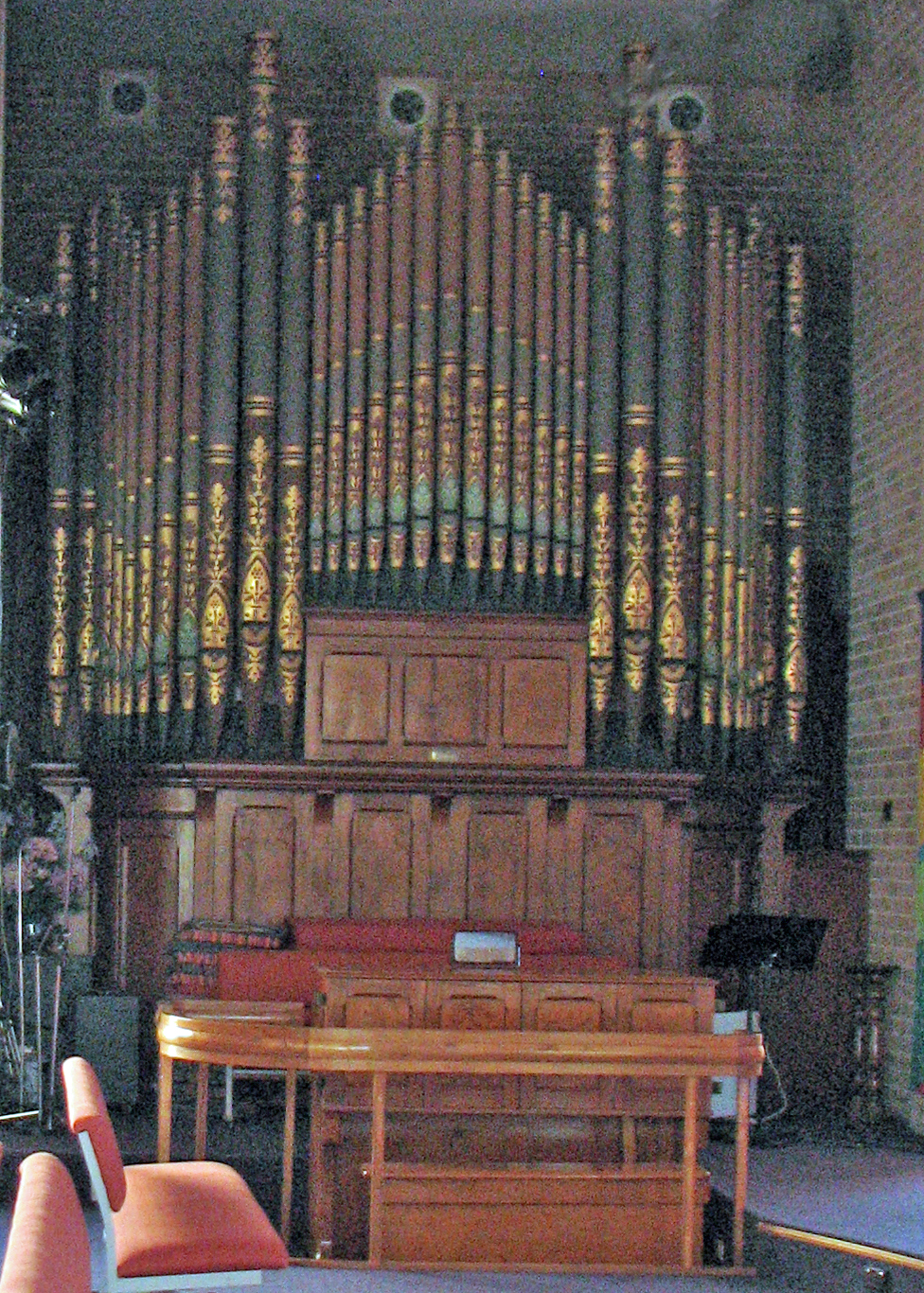
- Pipe Organ at Galston Uniting Church

- Location within Sydney Location within Australia
- 33°38′51″S 151°02′38″E
- Location: 11 School Road, Galston, Hornsby Shire, New South Wales, Australia

History
- Built: 1887 – 10 June 1888
- Built for: Congregational Church, Bourke Street, Darlinghurst

Site notes
- Owner: Uniting Church in Australia

New South Wales Heritage Register
- Official name: Pipe Organ from Bourke Street Congregational Church (former); Forster and Andrews Pipe Organ; Galston Uniting Church Pipe Organ
- Type: State heritage (movable / collection)
- Designated: 2 April 1999
- Reference no.: 382
- Type: Church Pipe Organ
- Category: Religion
- Builders: Forster and Andrews

The Galston Uniting Church Pipe Organ or Pipe Organ from Bourke Street Congregational Church is a heritage-listed church pipe organ located at 11 School Road, Galston in the Hornsby Shire local government area of New South Wales, Australia. It was built by Forster and Andrews. It is also known as Pipe Organ from Bourke Street Congregational Church (former) and Forster and Andrews Pipe Organ; Galston Uniting Church Pipe Organ. The property is owned by Uniting Church in Australia. It was added to the New South Wales State Heritage Register on 2 April 1999.

== History ==
The organ uses mechanical action and was built in 1887 by Forster and Andrews of Hull, England, for the Congregational Church, Bourke Street, Darlinghurst, to a specification designed by Thomas Sharpe, organist of All Saints' Anglican Church, Woollahra. Installation was carried out by Charles Richardson. The organ was a gift to the church by the three Misses Baxter, the original purchase cost being A£746 plus £50 for freight and erection. The formal opening of the organ was at a service on Sunday 10 June 1888, at which Thomas Sharpe was the organist.

The organ was regularly used for worship over the next eighty years. Following church union, the Fellowship of Congregational Churches sold the Darlinghurst property in 1984. The organ remained on the site for a further three years.

A small group from the Dural Uniting Church began to investigate the possibility of including this organ into the new building development on the Galston site. Enthusiasm for the proposal grew, and following a petition and Parish Council approval, an application was submitted to the Heritage Council of New South Wales for permission to remove the Heritage Fosters and Andrews organ from the Congregational Church building, Bourke Street, Darlinghurst. Also submitting an application was SCEGGS Redlands, Cremorne, and on 3 July 1986, the SCEGGS Redlands application was successful.

Since the Dural application was unsuccessful, application was made to Saint Alban The Martyr Anglican Church, St Albans, to purchase their 1890 Telford and Telford pipe organ. This application was accepted, and the organ was removed and stored for refurbishing in January 1987.

On or about 14 August 1986, the Galston congregation was notified that SCEGGS Redlands were undecided about finalising the purchase of the Forster and Andrews organ. Purchase of the organ by the Galston congregation was concluded by 25 August 1986, for the sum of $8,500. An application to the Heritage Council of New South Wales on 2 October 1986, approved the removal of the organ from the Darlinghurst site, and installation of it in the church at 11 School Road, Galston.

It was then decided to offer the Telford and Telford organ from the St Albans church (with some refurbishment) for sale. St Mark's Anglican Church, Granville, purchased the organ for $20,000.

The removal of the Fosters and Andrews organ was carried out between November 1986 and February 1987. It was stored for refurbishment, and this long and laborious task continued over the next six years.

Galston Uniting Church was opened and dedicated on 22 October 1988, and the organ was gradually installed thereafter. The majority of the work was done by volunteers over seven years, with over 3,000 person hours of work. Supervision of the work was by Brown and Arkley, with the consultant for the Heritage Council of New South Wales being Christopher Dearnley. The final installation detail, tuning and voicing has been undertaken by Ian Brown and Associates. The organ has been fully refurbished and installed in its new location, and the specification is unchanged from when it was built.

On 6 June 1993 the organ was re-dedicated. Prayers were added to that of the Baxter sisters who at the original dedication on 12 June 1888, prayed that "the organ will ever be used for the purpose for which it has primarily been given, namely to glorify God by assisting the congregation to sing His praises."

== Disposition ==
=== i. Great (C-g''') ===
- Bourdon 16'
- Stopped Diapason 8'
- Open Diapason 8'
- Dulciana 8'
- Principal 4'
- Harmonic Flute 4'
- Twelfth 2 2/3'
- Fifteenth 2'
- Mixture III
- Corno di bassetto 8'

Three composition pedals.

=== ii. Swell (C-g''') ===
- Bourdon 16'
- Open Diapason 8'
- Lieblich Gedact 8'
- Gamba 8'
- Principal 4'
- Flautina 4'
- Mixture II
- Oboe 8'

Two composition pedals.

=== Pedal (C-f') ===
- Open Diapason 16'
- Bourdon 16'

=== Couplers ===
- Swell to Great
- Great to Pedal
- Swell to Pedal

== Heritage listing ==
The Pipe Organ from Bourke Street Congregational Church was listed on the New South Wales State Heritage Register on 2 April 1999.

== See also ==
- List of pipe organs
