= The Moth Effect =

Australian sketch comedy television series

- Genre: Sketch comedy
- Created by: Nick Boshier; Jazz Twemlow
- Country of origin: Australia
- Original language: English
- No. of seasons: 1
- No. of episodes: 6

Production
- Production companies: Bunya Entertainment; Amazon Studios

Original release
- Network: Amazon Prime Video
- Release: 30 June 2021 – present

The Moth Effect is an Australian sketch comedy television series on Amazon Prime Video from 30 July 2021. The series is Amazon's first scripted Australian Amazon Original series. The six part series features sketches, music videos and interstitials.

The Moth Effect was created and written by Nick Boshier and Jazz Twemlow, with a team of writers which includes Sarah Bishop, Bridie Connell, Mark Humphries, Nazeem Hussain, Natesha Somasundaram, Dave Woodhead and Meg O’Connell and Ramsay David Nuthall. is directed by Craig Anderson and Gracie Otto. produced by Lauren Elliott and Jordana Johnson and executive produced by Sophia Zachariou.

== Cast ==
The series features Bryan Brown, Vincent D'Onofrio, David Wenham, Jack Thompson, Miranda Otto, Ben Lawson, Peter O'Brien, Kate Box, Zoe Terakes, Miranda Tapsell, Jake Ryan, Mark Humphries, Nazeem Hussain, Zoe Coombs Marr, Jonny Brugh, Lucinda Price, Dave Woodhead, Louis Hanson, Steen Raskopoulos, Tim Franklin, Sam Cotton, Christiaan Van Vuuren, Sarah Bishop, Sam Campbell, Megan Wilding and Brooke Boney.
