= OtherLife =

2017 Australian film directed by Ben C. Lucas

- Theatrical film poster
- Directed by: Ben C. Lucas
- Screenplay by: Gregory Widen; Kelley Eskridge; Ben C. Lucas
- Based on: Solitaire by Kelley Eskridge
- Produced by: Jamie Hilton; Janelle Landers; Aidan O'Bryan; Michael Pontin; Tommaso Fiacchino; Marco Mehlitz; Bo Hyde; Lucas Howe
- Starring: Jessica De Gouw; T.J. Power; Thomas Cocquerel
- Cinematography: Dan Freene
- Edited by: Leanne Cole
- Music by: Jed Palmer
- Production companies: See Pictures; Cherry Road Films; WBMC
- Release date: 16 June 2017 (Sydney Film Festival)
- Running time: 96 minutes
- Country: Australia
- Language: English

OtherLife is a 2017 Australian science fiction thriller film directed by Ben C. Lucas. It stars Jessica De Gouw as the co-founder of OtherLife, a company that developed a form of biological virtual reality. When her business partner, played by T.J. Power, insists she license it for unethical use, she struggles to retain control of her invention with the help of her lover, played by Thomas Cocquerel.

The film is loosely based on the novel Solitaire by Kelley Eskridge.

== Plot ==
Ren Amari is the lead researcher at a technology company she co-founded with entrepreneur Sam. Using nanotechnology, Ren invents a biological form of virtual reality called OtherLife that can create realistic memories. A week before the product launch, she is testing its code on herself under the supervision of engineer Byron Finbar. Unknown to the others, she is also privately testing the product on her comatose brother, Jared. Ren hopes that the inserted memories will help him recover, though her father, a professor whose work she based OtherLife on, wants to stop Jared's life support. Amid these issues, her romantic relationship with coworker Danny begins to suffer.

Sam pitches OtherLife to investors, telling them they can market the product as a near-instantaneous experience that can last for days. Ren is horrified when Sam suggests they license it for use by the government as an alternative to prisons; inmates would be trapped for years inside their own head while only a minute would pass in real time, relieving prison overcrowding. While alone with Danny, Ren explains her research to him and shares a skiing simulation. Excited, Danny tries another simulation unsupervised, not knowing it is the experimental one Ren has designed for Jared. Danny has a seizure and dies.

The government is willing to avoid a trial for unlicensed human tests and Danny's death if Ren agrees to one year of solitary confinement in OtherLife. With no alternative, Ren agrees. She is then stuck within a simulation that includes simply a single room and basic necessities of life, including bottled water and canned tuna. After a full year, Ren breaks down when the confinement counter resets to 001 without her release. However, in her rage, she is able to dislodge a wall section and escape. As she emerges, she realizes she had been trapped in a real-world cell. She escapes and makes contact with a sympathetic coworker, who reveals that Danny survived.

Ren reunites with Danny and finds that OtherLife has become a major success and is being used for a wide range of applications, including long-term confinement stretching for centuries. Determined to stop Sam and salvage her work to help Jared, Ren develops a new, more advanced prototype of OtherLife. After she tests it on Jared, he responds positively but makes it obvious he desires death; Ren obliges him by unplugging the life support. Shortly afterwards, she awakens from the actual simulation. Her "escape" was part of a glitch in her year-long imprisonment. All her post-imprisonment experiences were part of an interactive OtherLife experience that she managed to trigger. Ren keeps this quiet, knowing Sam would use this technology against her wishes.

Once she recovers, she leaves the company to meet with her father. Recognising Jared's situation, Ren agrees with her father's decision to terminate Jared's life support.

While going over the data from her experience with Sam and Byron, Sam excitedly points out part of a brain scan that correlates with her interactive experience. When Ren refuses to cooperate, Sam abruptly forces her into a second year-long imprisonment, hoping that she will once again trigger the glitch and allow them to learn how to develop interactive experiences. Byron reluctantly goes along with it when Sam says it is the only way to force Ren's assistance. Ren again escapes from the OtherLife experience, but this time she does it by hijacking the simulation and making it go faster, thus experiencing mere minutes inside instead of a year. She regains consciousness and traps Sam in his own year-long OtherLife imprisonment simulation. Sam starts to have a seizure, but Ren refuses to allow Sam to escape until he has served a full 365 days, plus letting the clock tick over a few more days, so he understands the agony she herself felt when the countdown reset to one.

== Cast ==
- Jessica De Gouw as Ren Amari
- T.J. Power as Sam
- Thomas Cocquerel as Danny
- Liam Graham as Jared Amari
- Hoa Xuande as Coder #1
- Shalom Brune-Franklin as Coder #2
- Clarence Ryan as Byron Finbar
- Tiriel Mora as Dr. Robert Amari

== Production ==
Shooting started in Perth in June 2015 and lasted for five weeks. Director Ben C. Lucas was introduced to writer Kelley Eskridge's script before reading the novel. He said the script was originally written with a larger budget in mind; Lucas rewrote it to be smaller and more obviously Australian.

== Release ==
OtherLife premiered at the Sydney Film Festival in Sydney, Australia on 16 June 2017.

Other screenings include:

- Melbourne International Film Festival in Melbourne, Australia on 16 August 2017
- CinefestOZ in Busselton, Western Australia on 24 August 2017
- DownUnderBerlin Film Festival in Berlin, Germany on 15 September 2017
- San Diego Film Festival in San Diego, US, on 5 October 2017

Online, OtherLife was released on Netflix on 15 October 2017.

== Reception ==
Harry Windsor of The Hollywood Reporter called it "a stylish piece of sci-fi pulp fiction made with a sense of scale that belies its indie budget". Luke Buckmaster of The Guardian rated it 3/5 stars and wrote, "Ben C Lucas's innovative rumination on the pitfalls of technology has Hollywood appeal and features a darkly charismatic performance from Jessica De Gouw".

== See also ==
- Cinema of Australia
