= St Sophia Greek Orthodox Church, Surry Hills =

St Sophia Greek Orthodox Church
- St Sophia and Her Three Daughters Greek Orthodox Church
- Bourke Street Congregational Church and School
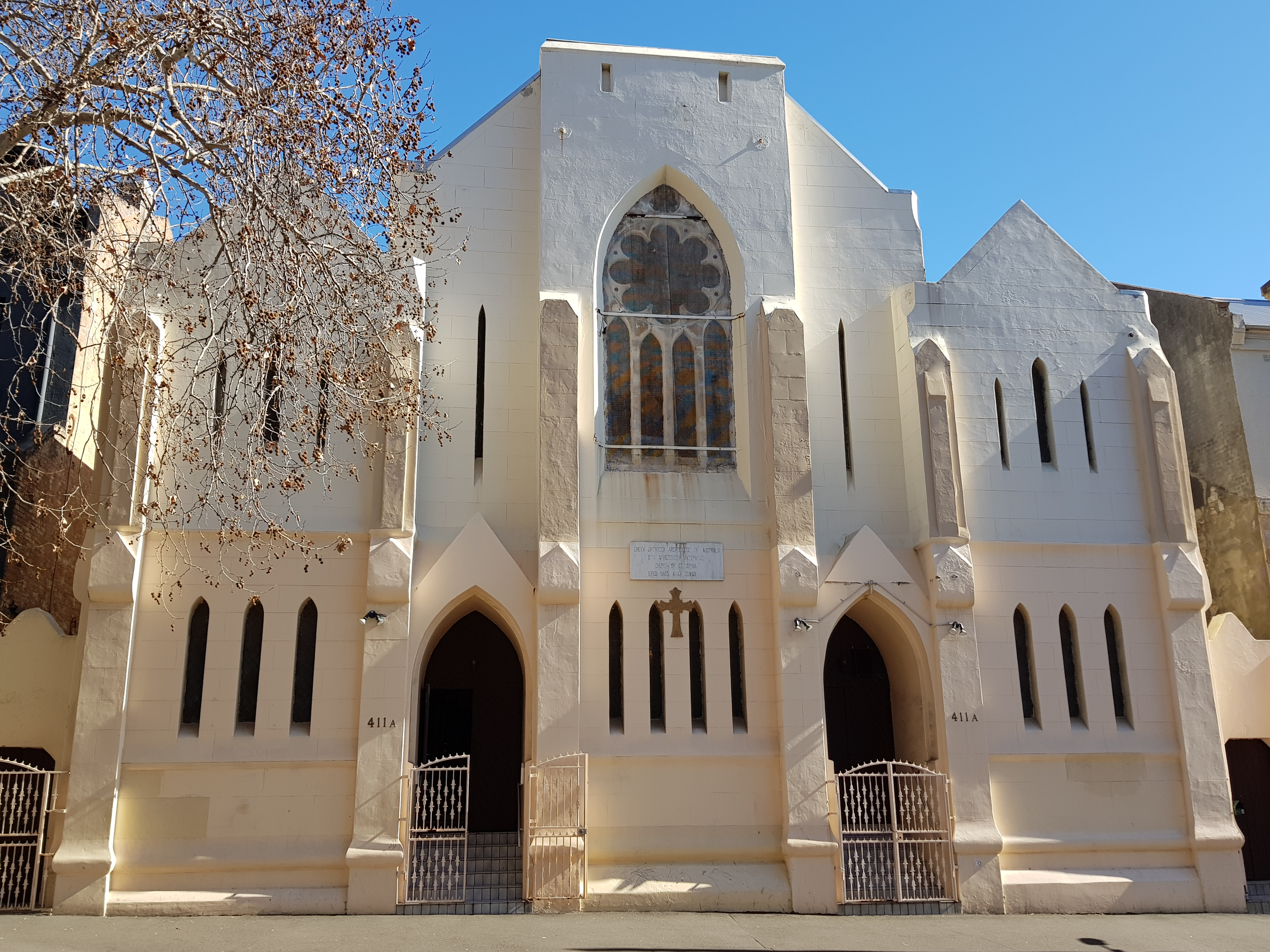
- St Sophia Greek Orthodox Church, pictured in 2018

- Location in greater metropolitan Sydney
- 33°52′55″S 151°12′58″E
- Location: 411a Bourke Street, Surry Hills, City of Sydney, New South Wales
- Country: Australia
- Language(s): Greek & English
- Denomination: Greek Orthodox
- Previous denomination: Congregationalism
- Website: stsophia.org.au

History
- Status: Church
- Dedication: St Sophia of Rome

Architecture
- Functional status: Active
- Years built: 1880–1980s

Administration
- Archdiocese: Australia
- Parish: St Sophia and Her Three Daughters

Clergy
- Priest: Archimandrite Fr. Irenaeus Triantis

New South Wales Heritage Register
- Official name: Bourke Street Congregational Church & School (Former)
- Type: State heritage (complex / group)
- Designated: 2 April 1999
- Reference no.: 382
- Type: Church
- Category: Religion

St Sophia Greek Orthodox Church, officially the St Sophia and Her Three Daughters Greek Orthodox Church, is a heritage-listed Greek Orthodox church at 411a Bourke Street in the inner city Sydney suburb of Surry Hills in the City of Sydney local government area of New South Wales, Australia. Formerly a Congregational church, the building is also known as the former Bourke Street Congregational Church and School. It was added to the New South Wales State Heritage Register on 2 April 1999.

== History ==
The building was designed by William Boles and opened in 1880. The church had existed since 1855, named the Bourke Street Wesleyan Church, operating out of a portable iron structure made from parts transported from England, built and designed by John Goold; when the new church was built, the old structure was moved to Stewart St, Paddington.

By 1933, the church was struggling both in congregation size and finances as the area had ceased to be seen as fashionable, and was no longer able to afford a regular minister, with ministers instead provided by the Home Mission Board. The collection plate takings had diminished to "only a few shillings". During the 1930s, free meals were provided to unemployed men in the school hall, with 20,000 meals having been served between 1932 and 1935.

The church closed in the late 1930s. It was later leased by the Greek Orthodox Church from 1974, who then purchased it from the Congregational Church in the 1980s. It became the St Sophia Greek Orthodox Church. The original church pipe organ (1888) was transferred to the Galston Uniting Church in the 1980s, as it was no longer required under the new owners. The Galston Congregational Church Pipe Organ is separately listed on the New South Wales State Heritage Register.

== Heritage listing ==
Bourke Street Congregational Church and School was listed on the New South Wales State Heritage Register on 2 April 1999.

== See also ==
- Greek Orthodox Archdiocese of Australia
- Greek Orthodox churches in New South Wales
- Sophia of Rome
