= Galston Gorge =

Valley in the Berowra Valley Regional Park, Sydney, Australia

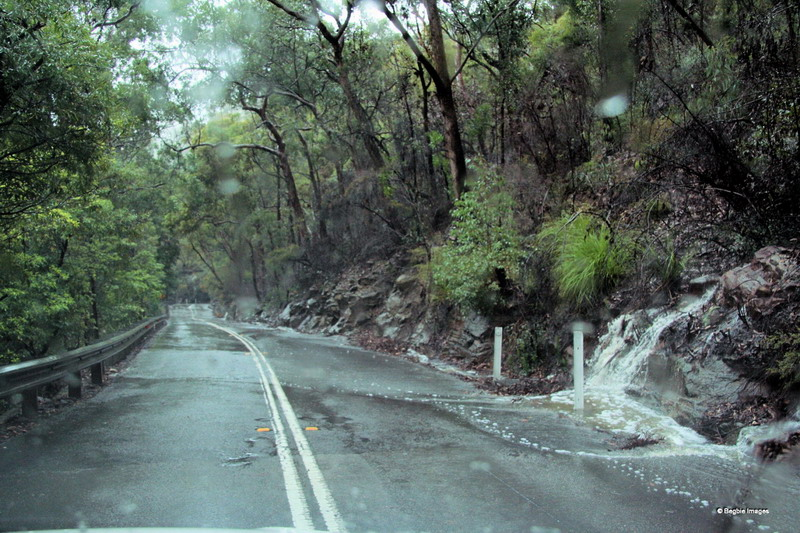

- Location within Sydney

Geology
- Type: Gorge

Geography
- Location: Galston, Sydney, New South Wales, Australia
- Coordinates: 33°39′55″S 151°04′46″E
- Rivers: Tunks Creek; Berowra Creek
- Interactive map of Galston Gorge

Galston Gorge is a valley located in the Berowra Valley Regional Park in Sydney, Australia. It separates Galston from Hornsby Heights, and is intersected by Galston Road and the heritage-listed Tunks Creek Bridge at the foot of the valley. Adjacent to Tunks Creek Bridge, there is a second concrete bridge that crosses Berowra Creek. The gorge itself contains many walking tracks, waterfalls and a variety of Australian flora, and is an area frequented by hikers, cyclists and rock climbers.

== Description ==
Galston Gorge is a valley containing dense bushland with numerous natural features such as waterfalls and streams accessible by established walking tracks. At the foot of the valley, Tunks Creek Bridge crosses Tunks Creek. The bridge was constructed in 1893 as a McDonald timber truss one-way road bridge, and became heritage listed in 2000 under the 1977 Heritage Act. This bridge was built alongside another McDonald Truss bridge crossing Berowra Creek in 1893. These bridges were open to the public in 1895. Although, the McDonald Truss bridge crossing Berowra creek was washed away during a flood in 1937, which led to the replacement of the second bridge. It was replaced with a concrete bridge in 1937 and is the same bridge used to this day. The larger size of the bridge at the time provided access for fire-fighting vehicles with access between Hornsby and Dural. There is also a small car park located near the base of the Gorge which contains three designated car spots and the Galston Gorge track head that allows access to sections of the Great North Walk.

Galston Road allows direct access between Galston and Hornsby Heights, and is the only road that extends through the entirety of Galston Gorge. From Tunks Creek Bridge to Hornsby Heights, the narrow road stretches approximately three kilometres with an average incline of 5%, and contains six hairpin corners. Given this, the road is challenging for longer vehicles and heavy vehicles over 7.5 m in length are prohibited. The road contains a guard rail along the Berowra Creek side of the road to enhance its safety however, the road is renowned for its dangerous nature.

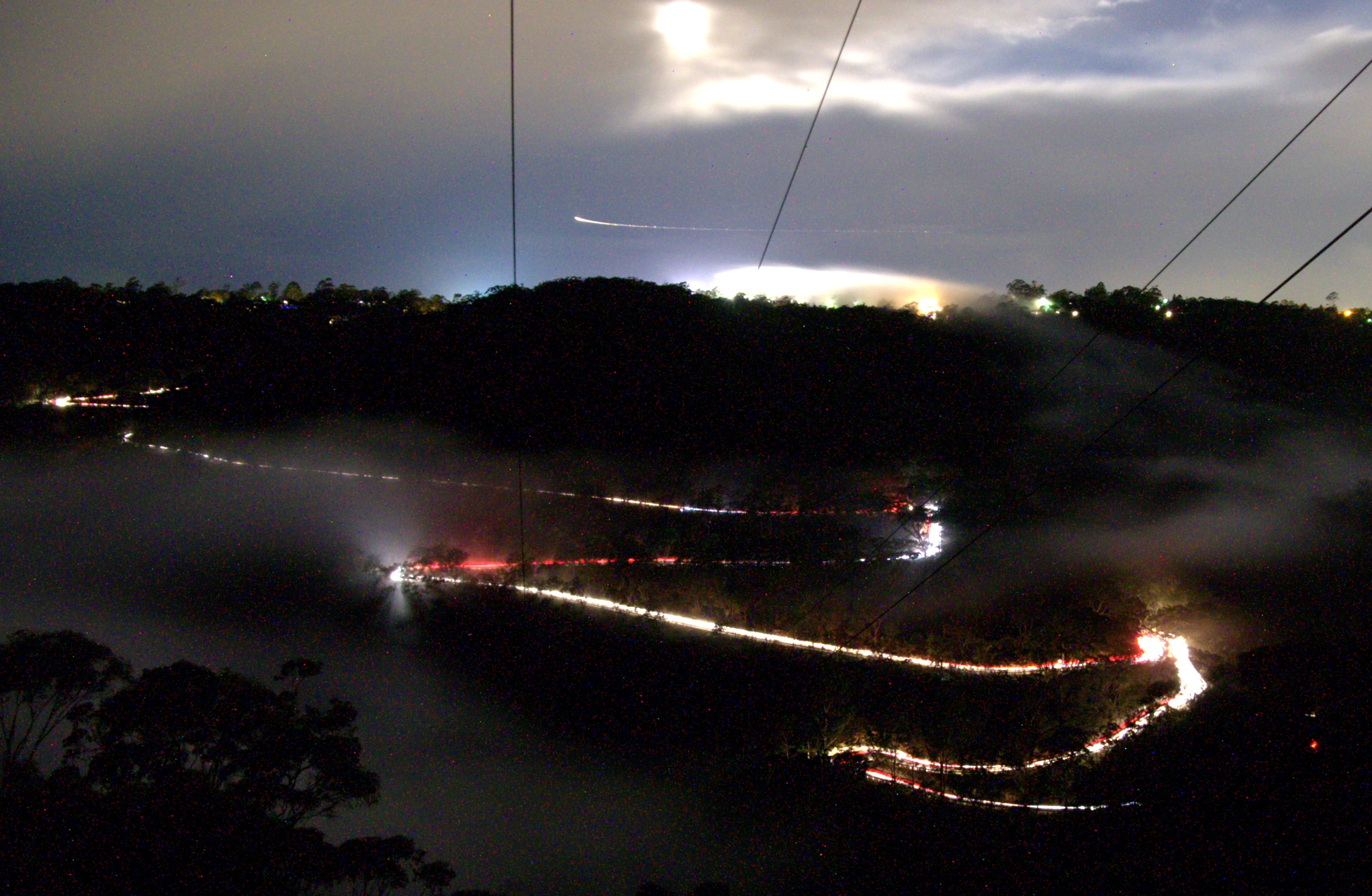
Long Exposure of traffic in Galston Gorge at night, 2018

The Gorge is also accessible via foot or bicycle. The Galston Gorge East and Galston Gorge West climbs are both routes which are commonly taken by cyclists. The Benowie Walking Track, the Tunks Trail and the Ulolo Trail are suitable bushwalking trails that run through the Gorge. The most significant of these is the Benowie Walking Track, which forms part of the Great North Walk that extends from Sydney Cove to Newcastle. It is 25 km in length through Berowra Valley National Park and can be accessed via six separate locations, generating a variety of different walks. The track is suitable for overnight walks, as the Galston Gorge Campsite is located along the Benowie Walking Track. Although, this campground does not provide any water or facilities for campers. Features such as the Gulley Creek Falls, a small creek crossing, are also seen along the Benowie Walking Track. The Heritage Bridges Walk is an established bush-walk which begins at the constructed wetlands in Clarinda Street, Hornsby, and follows predominantly fire trails with views of the two bridges before ending at the bottom of Galston Gorge.

== Local flora and fauna ==
Galston Gorge is the habitat for various native birds, mammals and reptiles. Approaching Berowra Creek, rainforest vegetation becomes dominant. Stands of Grey Myrtle Backhousia myrtifolia, ferns and water gums are native to this area. Possums and other nocturnal marsupials also reveal themselves at night. Along the Benowie Walking Track, commonly found flora includes Sydney Blue Gum, Blackbutt, She Oak, Sydney Peppermint and Smooth-barked Apple mixed with Coachwood, Blackwattle and Pittosporum. Commonly seen birds include honeyeaters, fantails, parrots, and various species of waterbirds such as the Pied Cormorant, White Faced Heron and Dusky Moorhen. More rarely, Satin Bowerbirds and Lyrebirds may also be seen.

Before 2000, a population of feral chickens lived in the bushland. Chickens who were abandoned by semi-rural properties owners, assisted in the growth of this population. Hornsby Shire Council culled this population in 2000.

== Traffic regulations ==
There are regular occurrences of traffic incidents in Galston Gorge, most commonly caused by large trucks becoming stuck at one of six hair-pin bends, or on the single lane Tunks Creek Bridge. As of May 2018, over 100 over-length trucks have caused traffic blockages in Galston Gorge. The installation of new signage and a camera based detection system that utilises infrared technology incurs a $2,270 fine to any heavy vehicle over 7.5 metres (25 ft) that attempts to enter Galston Gorge. A roundabout was installed on the Galston side of the Gorge to give heavy vehicles a chance to turn around and avoid heavy fines.

Oversized vehicles continue to utilise Galston road, and have been involved in traffic incidents including one in which the Tunks Creek Bridge was damaged, and a diesel spill occurred.
