= Galston High School =

Public school in Sydney, Australia

Location
- Galston, Hills District, Sydney, New South Wales; Australia; 33°39′37″S 151°02′21″E

Information
- Type: Government-funded co-educational comprehensive secondary day school
- Motto: Latin: Nitamur Neve Cedamus (Let Us Strive And Not Yield)
- Established: January 1972; 54 years ago
- Educational authority: New South Wales Department of Education
- Principal: Karen Shepherd
- Years: 7–12
- Enrolment: 560 (2024)
- Campus type: Semi-rural
- Colours: Teal and navy blue
- Slogan: Achieving Excellence – Inspiring Success
- Website: galston-h.schools.nsw.gov.au

Galston High School is a government-funded co-educational comprehensive secondary day school, located in Galston, a suburb in the Hills District of Sydney, New South Wales, Australia.

== History ==
The school site was previously owned by James David Waddell. A cottage was built in 1867, now known as Waddell Cottage. Waddell lived in the cottage until 1969, by when the house and orchard were in a bad state of repair. Waddell had refused to put in running water or have the electricity connected. Because he hadn't paid his taxes, the land was resumed by the government as it was thought to be an ideal location for a high school.

Galston High School officially began in 1972, although the first classes were taught at Baulkham Hills High School. In 1974, the school's buildings opened on the current site and were added to until its final completion in 1982. The first HSC class to graduate was in 1977.

In the early hours of 19 May 2014, Galston High School's library caught fire. This occurred from some technical difficulties in the electric wire systems.

== Notable alumni ==
- Mark Gibian SC, Vice President Fair Work Commission and pre-eminent Industrial Relations barrister
- Adam Berry, footballer
- Aden Young, actor
- Adam Wilkinson, talent manager
- Andrew Cox, Rugby, Parramatta Two Blues Captain
- T.J Power, Actor

== Notable staff ==
- Elena Duggan, winner of MasterChef Australia 2016

== See also ==
- List of government schools in New South Wales
- Education in Australia
