= Galston, New South Wales =

Galston
- Suburb
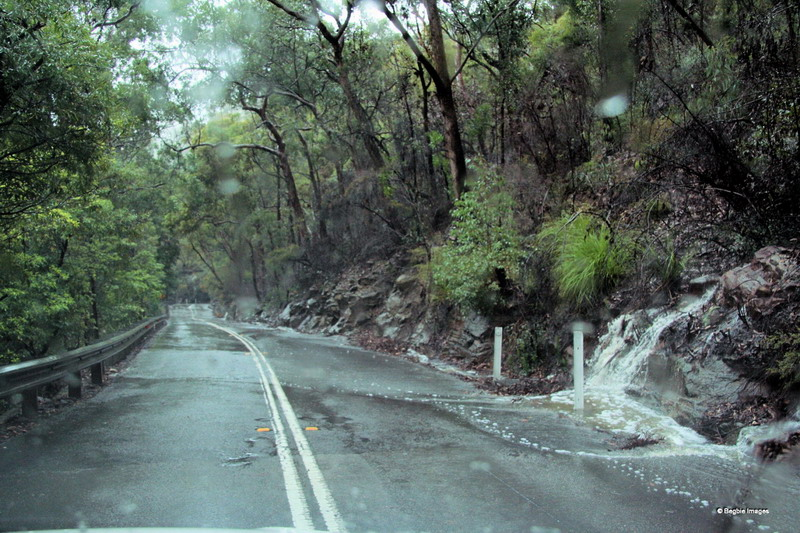
- Water sluicing across Galston Gorge Road during rain

- Interactive map of Galston
- Country: Australia
- State: New South Wales
- City: Sydney
- LGA: Hornsby Shire
- Location: 36 km (22 mi) NW of Sydney CBD

Government
  - State electorate: Hornsby
  - Federal division: Berowra
- Elevation: 204 m (669 ft)

Population
  - Total: 3,195 (2021 census)
- Time zone: AEST
- Postcode: 2159
- County: Cumberland
Suburbs around Galston
Glenorie	Arcadia	Berrilee
Middle Dural	Galston	Hornsby Heights
Dural	Dural	Dural

Galston is a semi-rural suburb located in The Hills District of Sydney, in the state of New South Wales, Australia. Galston is located from the city at 36 kilometres north-west of the Sydney central business district, in the local government area of the Hornsby Shire. Galston is in the NSW state electoral district of Hornsby and Federal division of Berowra. Galston is situated 16 minutes away from the suburb of Hornsby.

== History ==
The Aboriginal inhabitants of the region were from the Dharug language group. The area was originally known as Upper Dural until early settler Alex Hutchinson suggested in 1886 that the new school be named Galston after the town of Galston, East Ayrshire in Scotland. Galston had been an agricultural town since European settlement began, and it was home to a huge number of orchid growers. Galston Public School, Fagan Park and Waddell Cottage are some notable historical places in Galston. In 1973 Galston was proposed as one option for Sydney's second international airport but this proposal did not proceed.

== Population ==
In the 2021 Census, there were 3,195 people in Galston. 77.6% of people were born in Australia. The next most common country of birth was England at 5.1%. 86.7% of people spoke only English at home. The most common responses for religion were No Religion 31.9%, Catholic 25.2%, Anglican 18.1% and Uniting Church 5.0%.

== Heritage listings ==
Galston has a number of heritage-listed sites, including:

- 161 Main Road: Tunks Creek Bridge
- 11 School Road: Galston Congregational Church Pipe Organ

=== Galston Gorge ===
Galston Gorge is located between Galston and Hornsby Heights. Galston Gorge is at the bottom of Galston Road, a winding road with a number of hairpin bends. Galston Gorge is the most direct route from Galston to Hornsby, carrying over 5,000 vehicles per day. As seen in the photograph the Galston Gorge road does get extremely wet and occasionally surface flooding occurs during heavy rain. The design of the Galston Gorge road is such it requires heightened care when driving or riding - it was built originally for horse and cart. Serious accidents are common on this stretch of road. Wild chickens inhabit the lower reaches and can often be seen scratching around in the leaf litter beside the road. In January, 2014 a car flipped in the Galston Gorge. Over the years the Gorge has been blocked by oversized vehicles attempting to enter the Gorge. Vehicles over 7.5 metres are not permitted to enter the Gorge. A roundabout at the intersection of Calderwood Road and Galston Road has a barrier to prevent vehicles over 7.5 metres from entering the Gorge. Cameras are positioned next to the roundabout to record oversized vehicles that attempt to enter the Gorge, and significant fines are imposed.

=== Waddell Cottage ===
Historic Waddell Cottage, which is the former family home of one of the original orchard growers in the area, is situated next to Galston High School. The land on which Waddell Cottage sits on was handed over to the NSW Department of Education & Training over 40 years ago. A decision was made to keep the historic Waddell Cottage due to its long history. Waddell Cottage has been repaired numerous times and is well kept. The cottage is surrounded by a small garden which is in excellent condition. The cottage was built in 1866 by James Waddell.

=== History Cottage ===
History Cottage, owned by Hornsby Council and located next to Hayes Park (Galston Recreation Reserve), is the home of the Dural & District Historical Society.

=== Buddhist Temple ===
The Buddhist Golden Wheel Temple on Galston Road is a modern building with gardens which are tended by the members of the temple community. The gardens, which feature flowering peach trees, are open to the public in early September each year.

=== CRU Galston Gorge ===
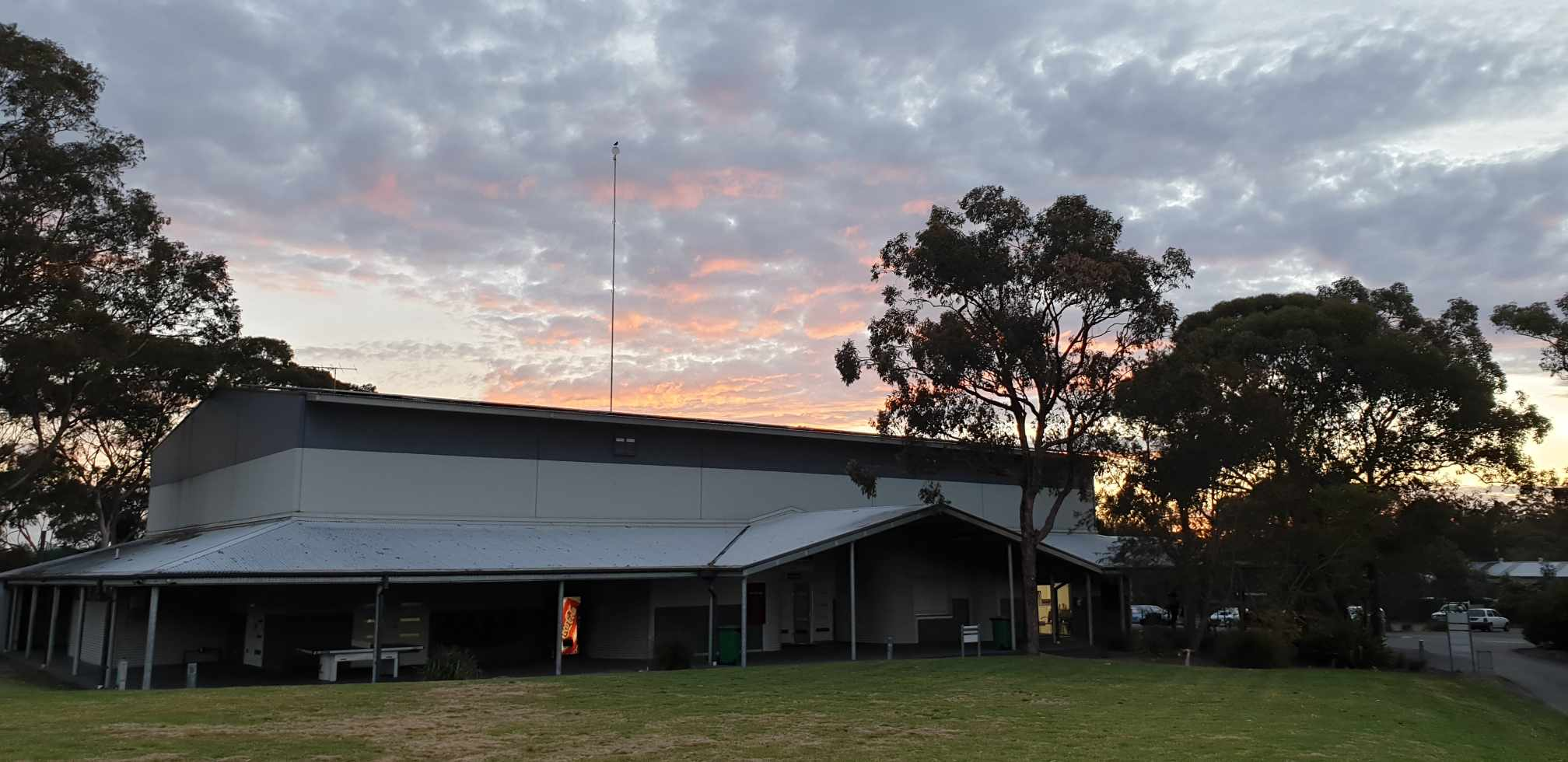
The main hall at CRU Galston Gorge

The Crusader Union of Australia runs a Christian education campsite at 8 Crusader Road, Galston. In a bushland location, The Galston Gorge Conference & Recreation Centre is used for church camps, music camps, school camps and community groups and accommodates up to 200 guests in lodges with ensuite bathrooms and lounge areas.

=== Fagan Park ===
Fagan Park is a large recreation area located at Arcadia Road opened in 1988. It includes the Gardens of Many Nations and a picnic area at Carrs Bush. Fagan Park was originally owned by the Fagan family as farming land before it was donated to the Department of Lands where then the land was appointed to the Hornsby Shire Council who currently maintain the land. Fagan Park's ecogarden was featured on a Gardening Australia episode which was broadcast on 12 July 2014.

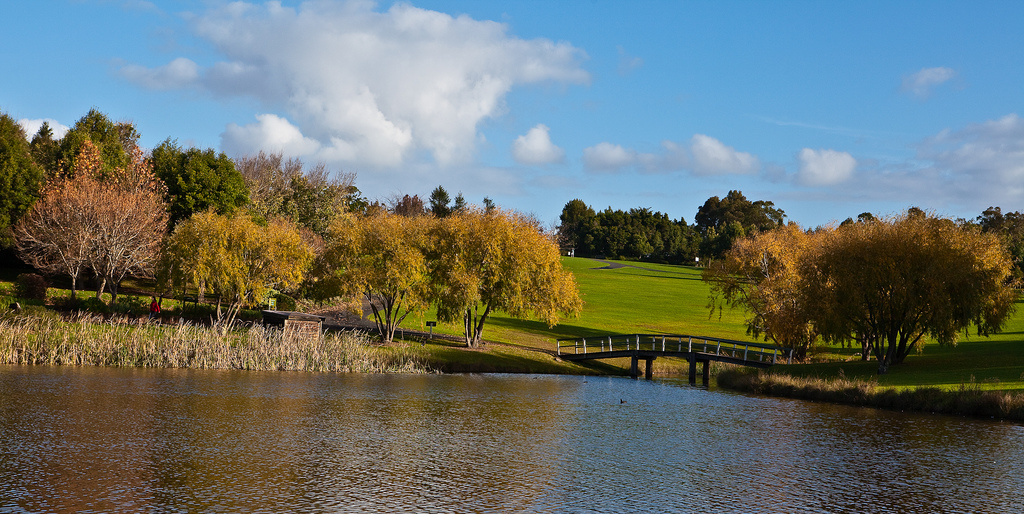
Fagan Park

== Facilities ==
Galston Aquatic and Leisure Centre

The Galston Aquatic and Leisure Centre features a 25-metre, six lane indoor heated pool with a squad club. The aquatic centre also features a gymnasium and a learn to swim club as well as many other aquatic activities. The facility is being redeveloped during 2022.

Galston skate park

Next door to the Galston Aquatic Centre is the Galston skate park where many skaters ride. The location opposite Galston High School makes it easily accessible for teenage skaters. The Hornsby Shire Council as a result constantly removes vandalism from graffiti attacks around the area at places such as the swimming pool noticeboard and at the buildings on Hayes Oval.

Hayes Oval

Hayes Oval is the home to the Hills Hawks Soccer team and due to the high usage of the facility coach rooms, a canteen and a spectator area were built. These buildings are situated on the Galston Road side of Hayes Oval. Hayes Oval is used for soccer, softball, cricket and many other sporting activities.

Galston Library

Galston Library is managed by the Hornsby Shire Council. Recently works were undertaken on replacing the roof of the Galston Library. Galston Library is not big and is an old building.

== Housing ==
There is a variety of housing available in Galston. There are a number of recently built modern brick townhouses and home units close in to the shopping village and several hundred modern brick dwellings in subdivisions near the village. Dwellings on the many 5-acre (20,000 m^{2}) lots in the suburb range from older simple fibro and timber cottages to substantial, luxurious brick and tile residences. The Hornsby Shire Council is currently reviewing its planning and development allowances to allow many 5 acre plots close to the centre of Galston to be split into subdivisions allowing growth in the Galston town centre region.

== Schools ==
Schools within the Galston suburb include:

- Galston High School (7-12)
- Galston Public School (K-6)
- KU Galston Preschool

The Galston community has access to education from preschool to year 12 without leaving the town despite the population and semi-rural location. Galston is not home to any private schools. The nearest private schools are

- Redfield College
- Pacific Hills Christian School
- Barker College
- The Hills Grammar School
- Northholm Grammar School

The Galston Community of Schools is a group of schools in the Galston area of the Hills District. The members include Galston Public School, Galston High School, Dural Public School, Glenorie Public School, Annagrove Public School, Arcadia Public School, Hillside Public School and Middle Dural Public School. All the schools are in an alliance with each other and have events such as the Galston Community of Schools Band Workshop at Galston High School and most of the schools play against each other in the sports of OzTag, Netball and Sport Skills Development. All the schools participate in Spring Fest which involves marching down Galston Road, Galston on a Saturday in Spring and other local organizations also participate in the festivities. Big banners advertising Spring Fest and schools from the Galston Community of Schools are hoisted on the month of the festival date on Galston Road.

== Culture ==
=== Events ===
Hornsby Shire's largest annual community event, the Bushland Shire Festival, is held at Fagan Park every September and is organised by Hornsby Shire Council. Galston hosted the annual Galston Country Music Festival, which was held on a Sunday in early September. 2008 marked the last one that was held. Past performers at the festival included Troy Cassar-Daley, Kasey Chambers, Pat Drummond, The Bushwackers, Smoky Dawson, Normie Rowe, Nicki Gillis and the pop group Bella. Galston Rotary Club which hosted this event, patronised by the legendary Frank Ifield, now stages Opera by the Lake in Fagan Park on the first Sunday in May. The Galston SpringFest (started in 1982/3 by Galston Rotary as the Galston Spring Festival) is also held in early September each year. The Galston Garden Club holds an Open Gardens Weekend each October where several local gardens are open to public view. Galston also hosts the Rotary Scarecrow festival where families and friends gather to create the best scarecrow.

== Commercial areas ==
There is no heavy industry in Galston. Many small businesses are run from homes in the area. Agriculture is a significant industry, with a number of orchards growing citrus, persimmons, strawberries and stone fruit. Some properties grow hydroponic produce. Chickens are raised on several properties with Summertime Chickens being one of the largest businesses in the area as well as Game Farm. There are numerous small specialist and larger retail plant nurseries in the Galston area.

=== Galston Shopping Village ===
The Galston shopping village is on Galston Road. The Galston Community Bendigo Bank branch which is a huge sponsor of the Galston community is also situated on Galston Road next to the Galston Shopping Village. Franklins Supermarket was located there.

=== New Galston Shopping Village Complex ===
The new Galston Shopping Village Complex is the new section of Galston Village and is located on the intersection of Galston Rd and Arcadia Rd. The new complex has a capacity of 11 stores and has three operational stores which are all located on the ground level. Following the numerous graffiti attacks on the carpark, the carpark has been repainted and is now closed 15 minutes after the last store closes.

== Transport ==
Galston has limited public transport facilities; the main ways to get around the suburb are by walking, driving and cycling. The nearest train station to Galston is Hornsby Station which is an Opal card activated station. The future North West Rail Link will serve Galston, with the nearest station at Castle Hill providing high speed rail travel to the Sydney Central Business District. The major bus operator in Galston is Hills Bus which operates as public transport for the whole of the Hills District. During mornings and afternoons on school days, a lot of buses pass through Galston to serve for Galston High School's large catchment area and Galston Public School as well as traffic from other local schools. Adults are not however allowed to travel on most of these buses as they are school buses except for bus 637 and bus 638 which are public buses.

- Route 637 travels from Glenorie to Castle Hill via Galston Village, Round Corner and Rogans Hill. Occasionally during peak hour the route is extended to Pennant Hills.
- Route 638 travels from Berrilee to Pennant Hills via Galston Village, Round Corner and new Line Road. Occasionally during peak hour the route is extended to Castle Hill.
