= Dave Woodhead (comedian) =

Australian radio personality

- Born: 1997 or 1998 (age 28–29); Darwin, Northern Territory, Australia
- Occupations: Comedian; radio host
- Years active: 2020–present
- Employer: Triple J

Dave Woodhead (born c. 1998) is an Australian comedian and radio personality best known for hosting the Lunch program on national youth broadcaster Triple J since 2020. He is a Torres Strait Islander man originally from Darwin.

== Career ==
Dave Woodhead grew up in Darwin, and started writing and performing comedy at 15, when he entered Melbourne's Class Clowns competition. He worked on NITV children's show Thalu as well as comedy programs Black Comedy and Get Krack!n.

In 2020, Woodhead began hosting Lunch on Triple J, taking over from Gen Fricker. He had previously filled in for Breakfast during NAIDOC Week in July 2019. Starting full-time broadcasting, he admittedly had "little to no experience on the radio and just got thrown into national breakfast radio."

Woodhead has toured several stand-up shows around the country; in 2019, the Herald Sun wrote he has "real stage presence and a nice line in stoner comedy."
