= Berowra Valley National Park =

National park in Australia

- IUCN category II (national park)
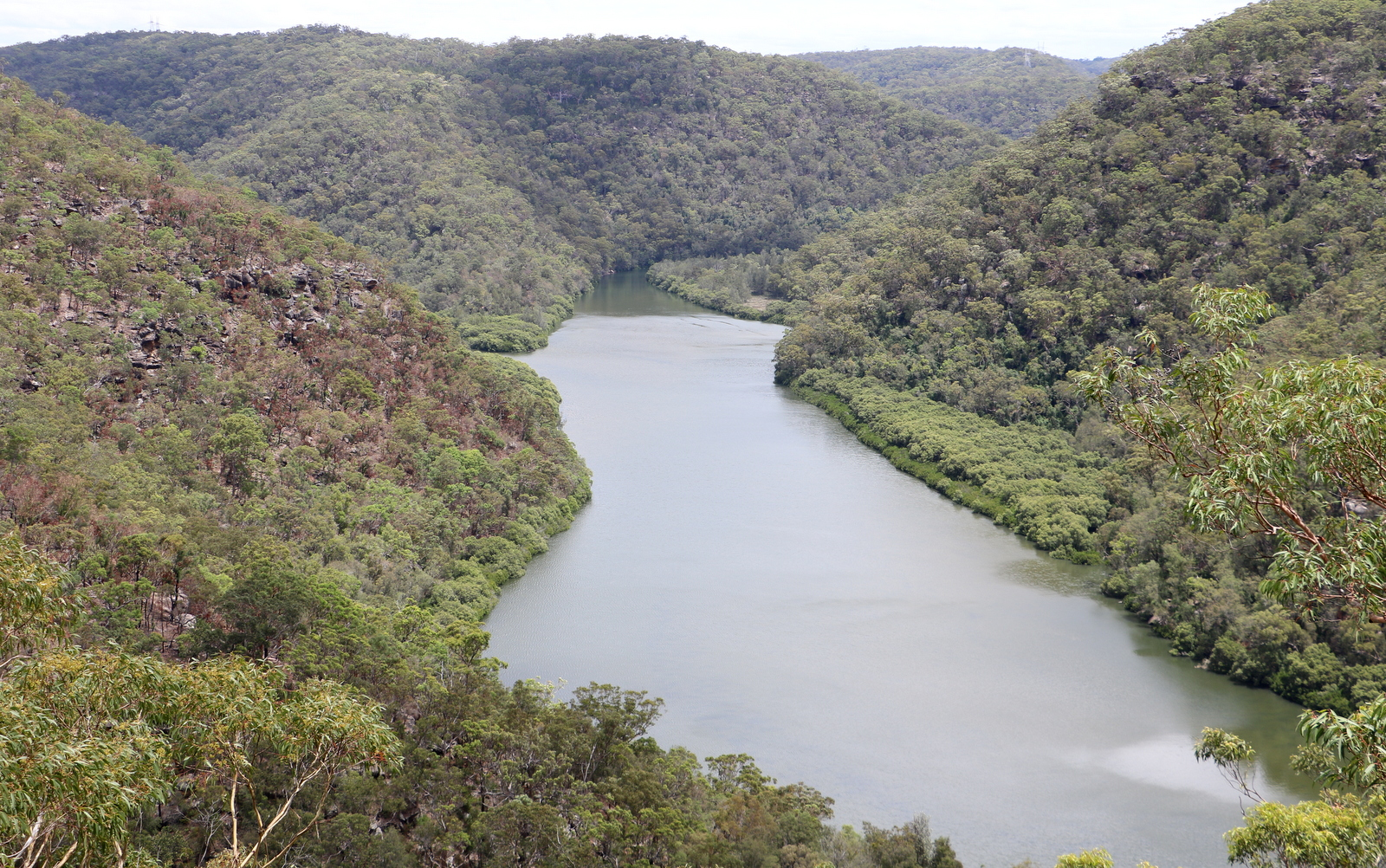
- Berowra Creek

- Location within New South Wales
- Location: New South Wales
- Nearest city: Berowra
- Coordinates: 33°40′54″S 151°06′04″E
- Area: 38.84 km^{2} (15.00 sq mi)
- Established: September 2012
- Governing body: NSW National Parks & Wildlife Service
- Website: http://www.nationalparks.nsw.gov.au/berowra-valley-national-park

The Berowra Valley National Park is a protected national park in northern Sydney, New South Wales, Australia. The 3,884-hectare (9,600-acre) national park is situated approximately 20 kilometres (12 mi) north-west of the Sydney central business district.

Located within the Sydney Basin, the park is part of the dissected Hornsby Plateau which is dominated by Hawkesbury Sandstone and predominantly covers the catchment area of Berowra Creek.

== Etymology ==
In the local indigenous language the word Berowra means a "place of many winds".

== Geography ==
A contiguous stretch of parkland, from south to north, its southern boundary is defined by Boundary Road, Pennant Hills; its south–eastern boundary defined by the western limits of Hornsby; its north–eastern boundary defined by the Pacific Motorway; its northern boundary defined by Berowra Waters; and its western boundary defined by a series of creek and gullies as the park extends into Galston Gorge and further south.

A 25-kilometre (16 mi) stretch of the Great North Walk is located within the national park. The park features fragments of the Blue Gum High Forest, a wet sclerophyll forest community.

== History ==
Part of the park originally formed as the Elouera Bushland Natural Park which was reserved in 1964 and consisted of 640 hectares (1,600 acres). Additional lands were acquired and the park was gazetted as Reserve No. 100092 for public recreation and the study and preservation of native flora and fauna in 1987.

This gazettal was in response to increasing community concern over the development of bushland areas in the Hornsby Shire. The park then came to be known as Berowra Valley Bushland Park. Further land additions were made to the park, which was gazetted as Berowra Valley Regional Park on 27 March 1998, and was gazetted as a national park in September 2012.

On 27 January 2013 a man was found alive in the park after spending 9 weeks being lost. He survived one of Australia's worst heatwaves during which daytime temperatures reached more than 45 degrees, surviving on water and food he had brought with him.

== See also ==
- Protected areas of New South Wales
- Geography of Sydney
