= Jessica De Gouw =

Australian actress

- Born: Jessica Elise De Gouw; 15 February 1988 (age 38) (Note: De Gouw's birthday is 15 February. She was 23 years old on 14 January 2012. Her full birth date, 15 February 1988, is calculated from these two facts.); Perth, Western Australia, Australia
- Other name: Jess De Gouw
- Education: Curtin University
- Occupation: Actress
- Years active: 2006–present

Jessica Elise De Gouw (born February 15, 1988) is an Australian actress. She is known for her role as Helena Bertinelli/The Huntress in the television series Arrow, as Mina Murray and Ilona in the NBC TV series Dracula, and as Elizabeth Hawkes in the WGN series Underground.

== Early life ==
De Gouw grew up in Lesmurdie, an eastern suburb of Perth, Western Australia, where she attended Lesmurdie Senior High School. She appeared in an episode of The Sleepover Club, as well as a short film. In 2010, she graduated from Curtin University with a degree in performance studies. She also appeared in another short film the same year.

== Career ==
After graduation, De Gouw moved to Sydney for her acting career. While there, she appeared in a number of TV series, mainly in guest starring roles.

In 2012, she debuted in the film Kath & Kimderella as Isabella, Kath and Kim's maid. She moved to Los Angeles later that year and landed the recurring role of Helena Bertinelli/The Huntress in the action-adventure series, Arrow.

In 2013, De Gouw was cast in the NBC series Dracula as Mina Murray alongside Jonathan Rhys Meyers and Oliver Jackson-Cohen. The series was cancelled after the first season.

In 2016, De Gouw was cast as fictional abolitionist Elizabeth Hawkes in the WGN series, Underground. She played the lead role Ren Amari in the 2017 feature film OtherLife based on the novel Solitaire by Kelley Eskridge.

De Gouw appeared in the 2018 Australian television movie Riot, about the 78ers, the Australian LGBTQ rights movement who fought for decriminalisation, recognition and equality.

She played the role of Sergeant Klintoff's wife, Louisa, in Leah Purcell's debut feature film, The Drover's Wife: The Legend of Molly Johnson (2021).

On 11 July 2024, De Gouw was named for Stan Australia series Sunny Nights. On 31 January 2025 De Gouw was named as part of the cast for Netflix series The Survivors.

== Personal life ==
De Gouw was in a relationship for several years with her Dracula costar, Oliver Jackson-Cohen.

In a June 2022 interview, she described herself as queer and said that she was in a relationship with a woman. De Gouw and her girlfriend, hairstylist Sophie Roberts, spoke about the pair's relationship for the February edition of Vogue in 2023.

== Filmography ==
=== Film ===
Year	Title	Role	Notes
2009	Bedtime Stories	Mother	Short
2010	The Ballad of Nick Chopper	Iva	Short
2011	Works Well with Others	Andrea	Short
2012	Kath & Kimderella	Isabella	
2012	The Dinner Meeting	Natalie	Short
2012	The Mystery of a Hansom Cab	Madge	TV film
2012	By Shank's Pony		Short
2013	These Final Hours	Zoe	
2014	Cut Snake	Paula	
2015	The Rezort	Melanie Gibbs	
2017	OtherLife	Ren Amari	
2018	Riot	Robyn Plaister	TV film
2020	Gretel & Hansel	Witch	
2021	The Walk	Hero	Short
2021	The Drover's Wife: The Legend of Molly Johnson	Louisa Klintoff	
2023	The Portable Door	Rosie Tanner	
2024	The Union	Juliet Quinn	
2025	You, Always	Jen Bell	

=== Television ===
Year	Title	Role	Notes
2006	The Sleepover Club	Amanda Hart	Episode: "Fallen Star"
2011	Underbelly	Constable Edie McElroy	3 episodes
2011	Crownies	Melody Kingston	1 episode
2012	Tricky Business	Yvette Bell	Episode: "Opportunity Knocks"
2012–2014	Arrow	Helena Bertinelli	4 episodes
2013–2014	Dracula	Mina Murray/Ilona	Series regular
2015	Deadline Gallipoli	Vera Grant	Mini-series
2016–2017	Underground	Elizabeth Hawkes	Series regular
2016–2017	The Last Tycoon	Minna Davis	2 episodes
2017	Sparebnb	Emma	Episode: "Steve and Emma"
2019	The Hunting	Eliza	Mini-series
2019	The Crown	Lucy Lindsay-Hogg	Episode: "Cri de Coeur"
2019	Vienna Blood	Amelia Lydgate	3 episodes
2020	Operation Buffalo	Eva Lloyd-George	Series regular
2020–2021	Pennyworth	Melanie Troy	5 episodes
2020–2022	The Secrets She Keeps	Meghan Shaughnessy	Series regular
2021	The Moth Effect	Sephen	Episode: "Celestial Graveyard"
2023	The Couple Next Door	Becka	Lead role
2023	The Artful Dodger	Peggy Gaines	4 episodes
2024	Ladies in Black	Fay Janosi	Series regular
2025	The Survivors	Olivia "Liv" Birch	TV series
2025	Reckless	Sharne	TV series
2025	Sunny Nights	Susi	TV series

== Awards and nominations ==
Year	Award	Category	Work	Result
2019	Equity Ensemble Awards	Outstanding Performance by an Ensemble in a Mini-series or Telemovie (with Damon Herriman, Kate Box, Xavier Samuel & Josh Quong Tart)	Riot	Won
