= Berowra Valley Regional Park =

- IUCN category V (protected landscape/seascape)
- Location within New South Wales
- Location: New South Wales
- Nearest city: Sydney
- Coordinates: 33.665°S 151.080°E
- Area: 0.087 km^{2} (0.034 sq mi)
- Established: March 1998
- Governing body: NSW National Parks and Wildlife Service
- Website: environment.nsw.gov.au/NationalParks/parkHome.aspx?id=N0630

The Berowra Valley Regional Park is in the Hornsby Shire in Sydney, Australia. Most of what was previously the regional park was placed in the Berowra Valley National Park in September 2012. Only a small portion remains as the regional park.

== See also ==
- Berowra Valley National Park
- Protected areas of New South Wales
