= Electoral results for the district of Ku-ring-gai =

Election results for Ku-ring-gai, New South Wales, Australia

Ku-ring-gai is an electoral district of the Legislative Assembly in the Australian state of New South Wales. Created in 1973, it has always been held by the Liberal Party.

== Members for Ku-ring-gai ==
Election	Member	Party
1973	John Maddison	Liberal
1976	John Maddison	Liberal
1978	John Maddison	Liberal
1980 by	Nick Greiner	Liberal
1981	Nick Greiner	Liberal
1984	Nick Greiner	Liberal
1988	Nick Greiner	Liberal
1991	Nick Greiner	Liberal
1992 by	Stephen O'Doherty	Liberal
1995	Stephen O'Doherty	Liberal
1999	Barry O'Farrell	Liberal
2003	Barry O'Farrell	Liberal
2007	Barry O'Farrell	Liberal
2011	Barry O'Farrell	Liberal
2015	Alister Henskens	Liberal
2019	Alister Henskens	Liberal

== Election results ==
=== Elections in the 2010s ===
==== 2019 ====
2019 New South Wales state election: Ku-ring-gai
Party	Candidate	Votes	%	±%
Liberal	Alister Henskens	29,369	60.27	−2.27
Labor	Amanda Keeling	8,891	18.25	+1.88
Greens	Qiu Yue (Viki) Zhang	6,315	12.96	−2.83
Sustainable Australia	Mark Ferris	1,636	3.36	+3.36
Keep Sydney Open	Liam Blood	1,466	3.01	+3.01
Liberal Democrats	Mitchell Strahan	1,053	2.16	+2.16
Total formal votes		48,730	97.79	+0.18
Informal votes		1,101	2.21	−0.18
Turnout		49,831	91.53	−1.22
Two-party-preferred result
Liberal	Alister Henskens	31,027	70.52	−2.46
Labor	Amanda Keeling	12,969	29.48	+2.46
Liberal hold		Swing	−2.46	

==== 2015 ====
2015 New South Wales state election: Ku-ring-gai
Party	Candidate	Votes	%	±%
Liberal	Alister Henskens	30,294	62.5	−10.3
Labor	David Armstrong	7,927	16.4	+8.5
Greens	Pippa McInnes	7,650	15.8	+1.9
Christian Democrats	John Archer	1,375	2.8	+0.7
No Land Tax	Len Gervay	1,192	2.5	+2.5
Total formal votes		48,438	97.6	−0.3
Informal votes		1,185	2.4	+0.3
Turnout		49,623	92.8	+1.8
Two-party-preferred result
Liberal	Alister Henskens	31,954	73.0	−13.9
Labor	David Armstrong	11,832	27.0	+13.9
Liberal hold		Swing	−13.9	

==== 2011 ====
2011 New South Wales state election: Ku-ring-gai
Party	Candidate	Votes	%	±%
Liberal	Barry O'Farrell	33,061	72.7	+7.1
Greens	Susie Gemmell	6,395	14.1	+0.9
Labor	David Armstrong	3,590	7.9	−5.9
Save Our State	William Bourke	952	2.1	+2.1
Christian Democrats	Witold Wiszniewski	948	2.1	−1.2
Outdoor Recreation	Alexander Gutman	536	1.2	+1.2
Total formal votes		45,482	98.3	+0.3
Informal votes		794	1.7	−0.3
Turnout		46,276	92.7	
Notional two-party-preferred count
Liberal	Barry O'Farrell	34,904	87.0	+8.0
Labor	David Armstrong	5,236	13.0	–8.0
Liberal hold		Swing	+2.3	
Two-candidate-preferred result
Liberal	Barry O'Farrell	34,212	81.3	+2.3
Greens	Susie Gemmell	7,858	18.7	+18.7
Liberal hold		Swing	+2.3	

=== Elections in the 2000s ===
==== 2007 ====
2007 New South Wales state election: Ku-ring-gai
Party	Candidate	Votes	%	±%
Liberal	Barry O'Farrell	27,831	65.6	+7.4
Labor	Adrian Macarthur-King	5,839	13.8	−7.3
Greens	Susie Gemmell	5,592	13.2	+1.2
Christian Democrats	Witold Wiszniewski	1,402	3.3	+0.3
Democrats	Jeannette Tsoulos	1,002	2.4	+0.4
Unity	Michael Sun	790	1.9	−0.9
Total formal votes		42,456	98.0	−0.2
Informal votes		857	2.0	+0.2
Turnout		43,313	92.4	
Two-party-preferred result
Liberal	Barry O'Farrell	29,939	79.0	+10.3
Labor	Adrian Macarthur-King	7,965	21.0	−10.3
Liberal hold		Swing	+10.3	

==== 2003 ====
2003 New South Wales state election: Ku-ring-gai
Party	Candidate	Votes	%	±%
Liberal	Barry O'Farrell	24,796	61.1	+4.8
Labor	Andrew Hewitt	7,548	18.6	−1.8
Greens	Susie Gemmell	5,064	12.5	+7.5
Unity	Chiming Shea	1,184	2.9	+2.9
Christian Democrats	Witold Wiszniewski	1,165	2.9	−1.3
Democrats	Ian Boyd	821	2.0	−7.3
Total formal votes		40,578	98.4	+0.1
Informal votes		680	1.6	−0.1
Turnout		41,258	91.7	
Two-party-preferred result
Liberal	Barry O'Farrell	26,582	71.6	+1.6
Labor	Andrew Hewitt	10,543	28.4	−1.6
Liberal hold		Swing	+1.6	

=== Elections in the 1990s ===
==== 1999 ====
1999 New South Wales state election: Ku-ring-gai
Party	Candidate	Votes	%	±%
Liberal	Barry O'Farrell	22,708	56.3	−10.1
Labor	Jan Butland	8,241	20.4	+7.2
Democrats	Neil Halliday	3,769	9.3	+1.4
Greens	Andrew Burke	2,004	5.0	+1.4
Christian Democrats	Matthew Ayres	1,698	4.2	+2.8
One Nation	Robert Webeck	1,416	3.5	+3.5
Against Further Immigration	Mick Chehoff	379	0.9	+0.3
Natural Law	John Ryder	100	0.2	+0.2
Total formal votes		40,315	98.3	+1.3
Informal votes		710	1.7	−1.3
Turnout		41,025	92.4	
Two-party-preferred result
Liberal	Barry O'Farrell	25,298	70.0	−8.3
Labor	Jan Butland	10,826	30.0	+8.3
Liberal hold		Swing	−8.3	

==== 1995 ====
1995 New South Wales state election: Ku-ring-gai
Party	Candidate	Votes	%	±%
Liberal	Stephen O'Doherty	20,271	57.1	−5.4
Labor	Elizabeth Priestly	7,067	19.9	+1.6
Independent	Mick Gallagher	5,932	16.7	+8.7
Democrats	Colin Ward	1,633	4.6	−4.5
Call to Australia	Alex Sharah	624	1.8	−0.5
Total formal votes		35,527	96.6	+2.9
Informal votes		1,251	3.4	−2.9
Turnout		36,778	93.8	
Two-party-preferred result
Liberal	Stephen O'Doherty	22,912	69.0	−3.7
Labor	Elizabeth Priestly	10,290	31.0	+3.7
Liberal hold		Swing	−3.7	

==== 1992 by-election ====
1992 Ku-ring-gai by-election Saturday 22 August
Party	Candidate	Votes	%	±%
Liberal	Stephen O'Doherty	14,755	47.85	−14.57
Independent	Mick Gallagher	9,725	31.54	+23.54
Independent	Ted Roach	5,442	17.65	+8.57
Call to Australia	Robert Taylor	914	2.96	+0.73
Total formal votes		30,836	95.74	+2.00
Informal votes		1,371	4.26	−2.00
Turnout		32,207	82.68	−11.39
Two-candidate-preferred result
Liberal	Stephen O'Doherty	16,167	55.09	−17.62
Independent	Mick Gallagher	13,182	44.91	+44.91
Liberal hold		Swing	−17.62	

Nick Greiner (Liberal) resigned after the scandal known as the 'Metherell affair'.

==== 1991 ====
1991 New South Wales state election: Ku-ring-gai
Party	Candidate	Votes	%	±%
Liberal	Nick Greiner	20,588	62.4	−3.9
Labor	Sue Deane	6,023	18.3	−10.2
Democrats	Ted Roach	2,995	9.1	+9.1
Independent	Mick Gallagher	2,638	8.0	+8.0
Call to Australia	Robert Taylor	737	2.2	+2.2
Total formal votes		32,981	93.7	−3.6
Informal votes		2,203	6.3	+3.6
Turnout		35,184	94.1	
Two-party-preferred result
Liberal	Nick Greiner	22,491	72.7	+3.8
Labor	Sue Deane	8,441	27.3	−3.8
Liberal hold		Swing	+3.8	

=== Elections in the 1980s ===
==== 1988 ====
1988 New South Wales state election: Ku-ring-gai
Party	Candidate	Votes	%	±%
Liberal	Nick Greiner	23,879	79.7	+3.5
Labor	Anna Booth	6,097	20.3	+2.6
Total formal votes		29,976	97.7	−0.8
Informal votes		718	2.3	+0.8
Turnout		30,694	93.5	
Liberal hold		Swing	+0.3	

==== 1984 ====
1984 New South Wales state election: Ku-ring-gai
Party	Candidate	Votes	%	±%
Liberal	Nick Greiner	24,271	77.8	+11.2
Labor	Ian Cameron	5,096	16.3	−7.2
Democrats	Pamela Tuckwell	1,829	5.9	−4.1
Total formal votes		31,196	98.4	+0.9
Informal votes		500	1.6	−0.9
Turnout		31,696	92.5	+1.8
Two-party-preferred result
Liberal	Nick Greiner		80.9	+10.1
Labor	Ian Cameron		19.1	−10.1
Liberal hold		Swing	+10.1	

==== 1981 ====
1981 New South Wales state election: Ku-ring-gai
Party	Candidate	Votes	%	±%
Liberal	Nick Greiner	19,750	66.6	+1.1
Labor	Ian Cameron	6,970	23.5	−11.0
Democrats	Pamela Tuckwell	2,954	9.9	+9.9
Total formal votes		29,674	97.5	
Informal votes		764	2.5	
Turnout		30,438	90.7	
Two-party-preferred result
Liberal	Nick Greiner	20,550	70.8	+5.3
Labor	Ian Cameron	8,470	29.2	−5.3
Liberal hold		Swing	+5.3	

==== 1980 by-election ====
1980 Ku-ring-gai by-election Saturday 13 September
Party	Candidate	Votes	%	±%
Liberal	Nick Greiner	15,681	68.7	+3.2
Independent	Brian Buckley	7,152	31.3	
Total formal votes		22,833	96.1	−1.9
Informal votes		917	3.9	+1.9
Turnout		23,750	71.1	−19.9
Liberal hold		Swing	+3.2 (Note: compared to the two-party-preferred result for the 1978 Ku-ring-gai election.)	

John Maddison (Liberal) resigned.

=== Elections in the 1970s ===
==== 1978 ====
1978 New South Wales state election: Ku-ring-gai
Party	Candidate	Votes	%	±%
Liberal	John Maddison	19,350	65.5	−7.5
Labor	Ian Cameron	10,205	34.5	+14.1
Total formal votes		29,555	98.0	−0.9
Informal votes		592	2.0	+0.9
Turnout		30,147	91.0	−1.5
Liberal hold		Swing	−12.2	

==== 1976 ====
1976 New South Wales state election: Ku-ring-gai
Party	Candidate	Votes	%	±%
Liberal	John Maddison	21,605	73.0	−4.6
Labor	Ian Cameron	6,020	20.4	+2.5
Workers	David Griffiths	1,960	6.6	+6.6
Total formal votes		29,585	98.9	+0.8
Informal votes		316	1.1	−0.8
Turnout		29,901	92.5	−0.1
Two-party-preferred result
Liberal	John Maddison	22,977	77.7	−3.5
Labor	Ian Cameron	6,608	22.3	+3.5
Liberal hold		Swing	−3.5	

==== 1973 ====
1973 New South Wales state election: Ku-ring-gai
Party	Candidate	Votes	%	±%
Liberal	John Maddison	21,357	77.6	
Labor	Ian Cameron	4,932	17.9	
Democratic Labor	Norma Boyle	1,235	4.5	
Total formal votes		27,524	98.1	
Informal votes		525	1.9	
Turnout		28,049	92.6	
Two-party-preferred result
Liberal	John Maddison	22,345	81.2	+0.1
Labor	Ian Cameron	5,179	18.8	−0.1
Liberal notional hold		Swing	+0.1	

Ku-ring-gai was a new seat with a notional Liberal majority.
