= Electoral district of Ku-ring-gai =

Former New South Wales electoral district

Ku-ring-gai New South Wales—Legislative Assembly
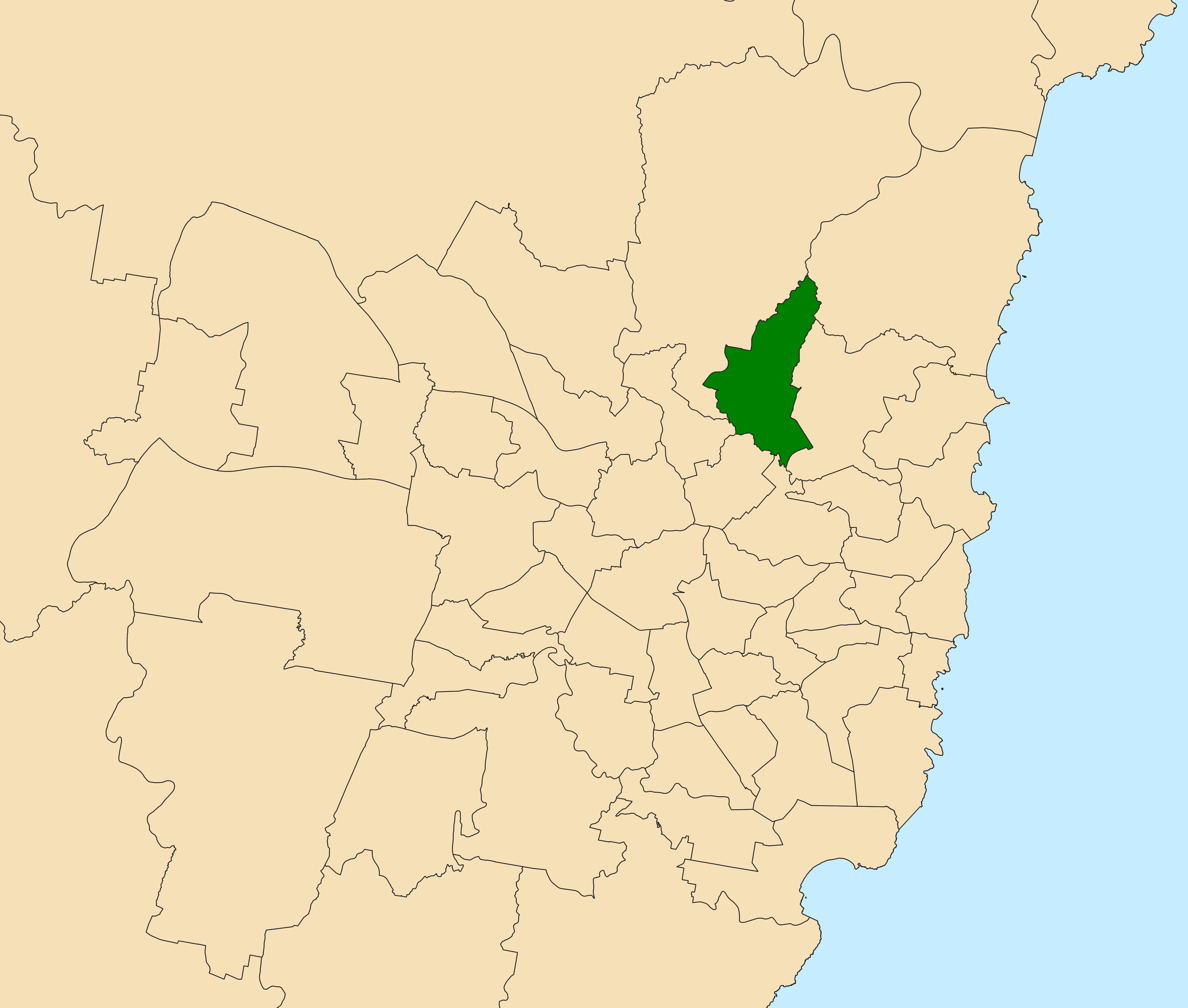
- Location within Sydney
- State: New South Wales
- Dates current: 1973–2023
- Namesake: Kuringgai
- Electors: 54,441 (2019)
- Area: 52.45 km^{2} (20.3 sq mi)
- Demographic: Urban
Electorates around Ku-ring-gai:
Hornsby	Hornsby	Pittwater
Epping	Ku-ring-gai	Davidson
Ryde	Lane Cove	Willougby

Ku-ring-gai was an electoral district of the Legislative Assembly in the Australian state of New South Wales. On its final boundaries as Ku-ring-gai, the electorate covered the suburbs and parts of the suburbs of Gordon, Hornsby, Killara, Lindfield, Normanhurst, North Turramurra, North Wahroonga, Pymble, South Turramurra, Thornleigh, Turramurra, Wahroonga, Waitara, Warrawee and West Pymble. The seat was renamed Wahroonga as a result of the 2021 redistribution.

== History ==
Ku-ring-gai was created before the 1973 election and was held by John Maddison, a minister in the government of Askin, who had previously been the member for Hornsby. Maddison retired in 1980 and future Premier of New South Wales Nick Greiner won the seat at a by-election. He held the seat until resigning from Parliament and as Premier in 1992 in the aftermath of the ICAC enquiry into the Metherell affair. He was succeeded by Stephen O'Doherty, who in 1999 chose to follow the majority of his constituents into the re-created seat of Hornsby. Barry O'Farrell transferred to Ku-ring-gai in 1999 after his seat of Northcott was abolished, and held it when he became Premier after leading the Coalition to a massive landslide victory in the 2011 state election. He resigned as premier in 2014 and retired from politics after the 2015 state election, handing the seat to fellow Liberal Alister Henskens.

Located in the Liberal heartland of the North Shore, Ku-ring-gai was in Liberal hands for its entire existence, and for much of that time was an ultra-safe seat even by North Shore standards. The Liberals never tallied less than 65 percent of the two-party vote, and always took the seat on the first count with no need for preferences. At the 2011 election, for instance, O'Farrell was reelected with 81.3% of the two-candidate-preferred vote, making Ku-ring-gai the safest seat in the entire NSW parliament.

While Labor frequently runs dead in north Sydney, Ku-ring-gai was particularly hostile territory for Labor. From the 1990s onward, Labor struggled to get 20 percent of the primary vote. In 2011, for example, Labor was pushed into third place behind the Greens. The seat was almost entirely within the federal seat of Bradfield, previously one of the safest federal Liberal seats in the country, prior to the 2022 election where it became marginal.

At the time of its abolition, Ku-ring-gai was one of four electorates in the New South Wales Legislative Assembly that had been held by two Premiers of New South Wales while in office. Both Premiers Greiner and O'Farrell held Ku-ring-gai while in office. The other three electorates being Maroubra, Willoughby and Wollondilly.

As a result of a redistribution in 2021, Ku-ring-gai was abolished at the 2023 election, largely replaced by Wahroonga.

== Members for Ku-ring-gai ==
Member	Party	Period
John Maddison	Liberal	1973–1980
Nick Greiner	Liberal	1980–1992
Stephen O'Doherty	Liberal	1992–1999
Barry O'Farrell	Liberal	1999–2015
Alister Henskens	Liberal	2015–2023

== Election results ==
2019 New South Wales state election: Ku-ring-gai
Party	Candidate	Votes	%	±%
Liberal	Alister Henskens	29,369	60.27	−2.27
Labor	Amanda Keeling	8,891	18.25	+1.88
Greens	Qiu Yue (Viki) Zhang	6,315	12.96	−2.83
Sustainable Australia	Mark Ferris	1,636	3.36	+3.36
Keep Sydney Open	Liam Blood	1,466	3.01	+3.01
Liberal Democrats	Mitchell Strahan	1,053	2.16	+2.16
Total formal votes		48,730	97.79	+0.18
Informal votes		1,101	2.21	−0.18
Turnout		49,831	91.53	−1.22
Two-party-preferred result
Liberal	Alister Henskens	31,027	70.52	−2.46
Labor	Amanda Keeling	12,969	29.48	+2.46
Liberal hold		Swing	−2.46	
