= Leioproctus thornleighensis =

Scientific classification
- Kingdom: Animalia
- Phylum: Arthropoda
- Clade: Pancrustacea
- Class: Insecta
- Order: Hymenoptera
- Family: Colletidae
- Genus: Leioproctus
- Species: L. thornleighensis

Binomial name
- Leioproctus thornleighensis (Cockerell, 1906)

Synonyms
- Paracolletes thornleighensis Cockerell, 1906; Lamprocolletes nigriventris Friese, 1924

Species of bee

Leioproctus thornleighensis, or Leioproctus (Leioproctus) thornleighensis, is a species of bee in the family Colletidae and subfamily Colletinae. It is endemic to Australia. It was described by British-American entomologist Theodore Dru Alison Cockerell in 1906.

== Distribution and habitat ==
The species occurs in eastern Australia. The type locality is Thornleigh, New South Wales. Other published localities include Kuranda, Caloundra and Brisbane in Queensland.

== Behaviour ==
The adults are flying mellivores.
