= Electoral district of Wahroonga =

Electorate in New South Wales, Australia

Wahroonga New South Wales—Legislative Assembly
- Interactive map of district boundaries from the 2023 state election
- State: New South Wales
- Created: 2023
- MP: Alister Henskens
- Party: Liberal
- Namesake: Wahroonga
- Electors: 58,521 (2020)
- Area: 50.28 km^{2} (19.4 sq mi)
- Coordinates: 33°43′44″S 151°06′36″E
Electorates around Wahroonga:
Hornsby	Hornsby	Davidson
Hornsby	Wahroonga	Davidson
Epping	Ryde	Lane Cove

Wahroonga is an electoral district of the Legislative Assembly in the Australian state of New South Wales. It was contested for the first time at the 2023 election.

It is an urban electorate on Sydney's upper North Shore.

== History ==
Formerly called Ku-ring-gai, the division was renamed to Wahroonga as a result of the 2021 redistribution. Based on the results of the 2019 election, it is a safe seat for the Liberal Party with an estimated notional margin of 19.0 percent.

== Geography ==
Centred around and its namesake suburb Wahroonga, its current boundaries takes in the suburbs of Normanhurst, North Wahroonga, South Turramurra, Thornleigh, Waitara, Warrawee, West Pymble, Westleigh and parts of Hornsby, Pennant Hills, Pymble and Turramurra.

== Members for Wahroonga ==
Member	Party	Term
Alister Henskens	Liberal	2023–present

== Election results ==
2023 New South Wales state election: Wahroonga
Party	Candidate	Votes	%	±%
Liberal	Alister Henskens	26,727	50.5	−7.7
Labor	Parsia Abedini	12,242	23.1	+3.9
Greens	Tim Dashwood	7,387	13.9	+1.1
Independent	Kristyn Haywood	4,927	9.3	+9.3
Sustainable Australia	Stephen Molloy	1,676	3.2	+0.2
Total formal votes		52,959	97.9	+0.2
Informal votes		1,116	2.1	−0.2
Turnout		54,075	91.5	+2.5
Two-party-preferred result
Liberal	Alister Henskens	28,940	60.6	−8.4
Labor	Parsia Abedini	18,849	39.4	+8.4
Liberal hold		Swing	−8.4	
