= Pennant Hills =

- Suburb
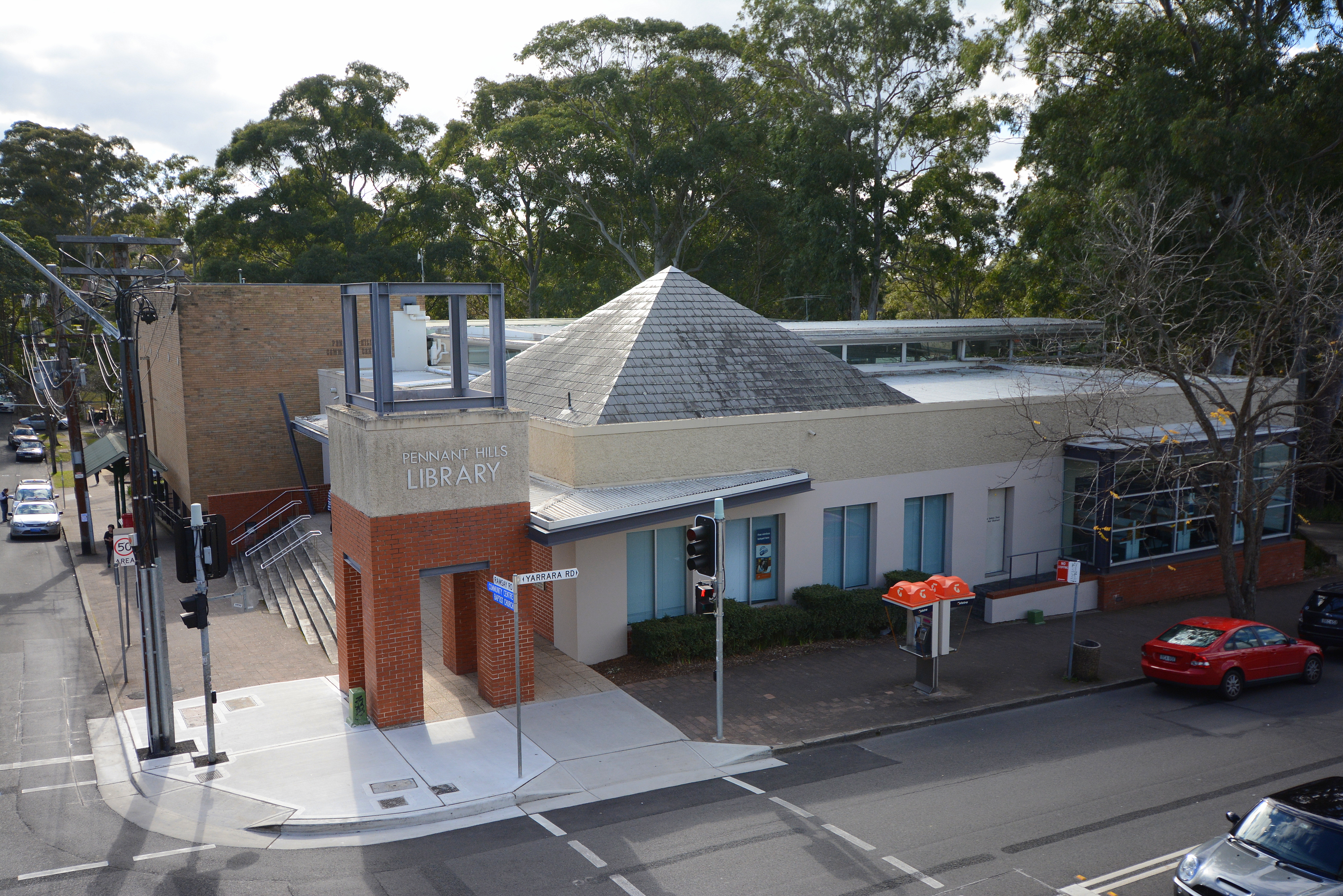
- Pennant Hills Library, Yarrara Road

- Interactive map of Pennant Hills
- Country: Australia
- State: New South Wales
- Region: Northern Sydney
- City: Sydney
- LGA: Hornsby
- Location: 18 km (11 mi) north-west of Sydney CBD

Government
  - State electorate: Epping, Hornsby, Wahroonga
  - Federal division: Berowra
- Elevation: 167 m (548 ft)

Population
  - Total: 7,588 (2021 census)
- Postcode: 2120
Suburbs around Pennant Hills
| Cherrybrook | Westleigh | Thornleigh |
| West Pennant Hills | Pennant Hills | Wahroonga |
| Beecroft; Cheltenham | North Epping | South Turramurra |

Pennant Hills is a suburb in the Northern Sydney region of Sydney, New South Wales, Australia. Pennant Hills is located 18 kilometres north-west of the Sydney central business district in the local government area of Hornsby Shire.

== History ==
The first white settlement occurred in the area with the establishment of convict timber camps in the time of Governor Lachlan Macquarie. Permanent white settlement of Pennant Hills began only in the 1840s and took off with the arrival of the Northern railway line in the 1880s. In August 1912 the federal government opened a Wireless Telegraphy Station, the first of its kind on a national level.

There are two distinct theories about the origin of the name Pennant Hills. One suggests the area was used as a site for raising flags, or pennants, for signalling purposes. However, the only recorded evidence of such a signalling system in the vicinity was one operating from 1824 to 1829 in the present suburb of Ermington and the use of the term 'Pennant Hills' is found in much earlier documents. In an 1801 muster list, 'Pennant Hills' is recorded as the place of residence of Ann Fay, wife of William Bellamy. In 1802 correspondence from Governor King to Joseph Banks, King refers to "the range of Pennant Hills". In 1920 the historian James Jervis suggested that the locality had been named after the naturalist Thomas Pennant, a prominent British ornithologist and zoologist and prolific author of the eighteenth century. Although Pennant never visited Australia his friends and acquaintances included Sir Joseph Banks, Captain James Cook and Francis Grose (whose son Francis administered the colony of New South Wales when Arthur Phillip returned to England in 1792). Under the patronage system of the time, colonial administrators and explorers often acknowledged their English supporters by naming geographical features in their honour.

The name Pennant Hills originally applied to the area now known as West Pennant Hills, located in the Hills District. However, when the northern railway line was built it passed through what is now Pennant Hills, so a suburb grew around the station and took on the name. The area around Thompsons Corner was renamed West Pennant Hills. Pennant Hills is hilly and the highest altitude is at Observatory Park on Pennant Hills Road, which once was the site of the old astronomical observatory.

During the 1960s and 1970s, Pennant Hills was the site of Chelmsford Private Hospital, where the unorthodox psychiatric Deep Sleep Therapy conducted by Dr Harry Bailey resulted in the deaths of dozens of patients.

== Commercial areas ==
Pennant Hills is one of the major commercial centres of Hornsby Shire. Several dozen shops are located at the north-west of the railway line, along with the local Pennant Hills Library. Several restaurants and cafes are located around Yarrara Road. Pennant Hills Marketplace, a local shopping centre, is located along Hillcrest Road. Residential houses are found in all areas in Pennant Hills, with recent modern apartments and office towers found along Pennant Hills Road. A significant commercial/industrial area can be found along Pennant Hills Road.

Pennant Hills is home to several entertainment venues including the Pennant Hills Hotel.

== Transport ==
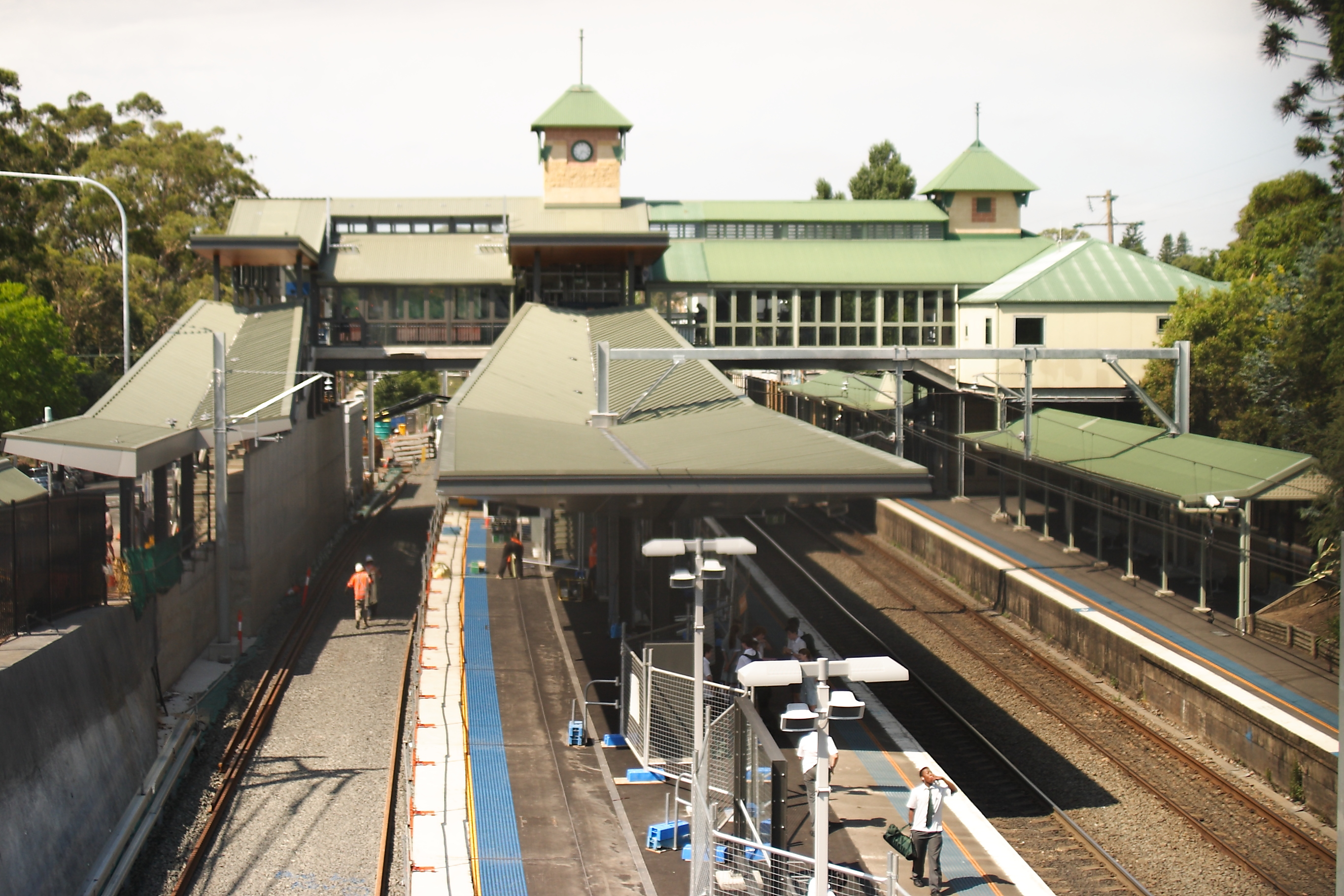
Pennant Hills train station on 10 December 2015, showing construction of the third track as part of the Northern Sydney Freight Corridor.

Pennant Hills railway station is on the Northern Line of the Sydney Trains network.

Pennant Hills Road is one of Sydney's major thoroughfares. Bus services by CDC NSW have their terminus in Pennant Hills and run to West Pennant Hills, Castle Hill and Cherrybrook.

== Schools ==
Pennant Hills has two public schools: Pennant Hills Public School established in 1925 and Pennant Hills High School established in 1966, and two Catholic schools, Mount St Benedict College a girls secondary school and St. Agatha's Catholic Primary School.

=== Parks and reserves ===
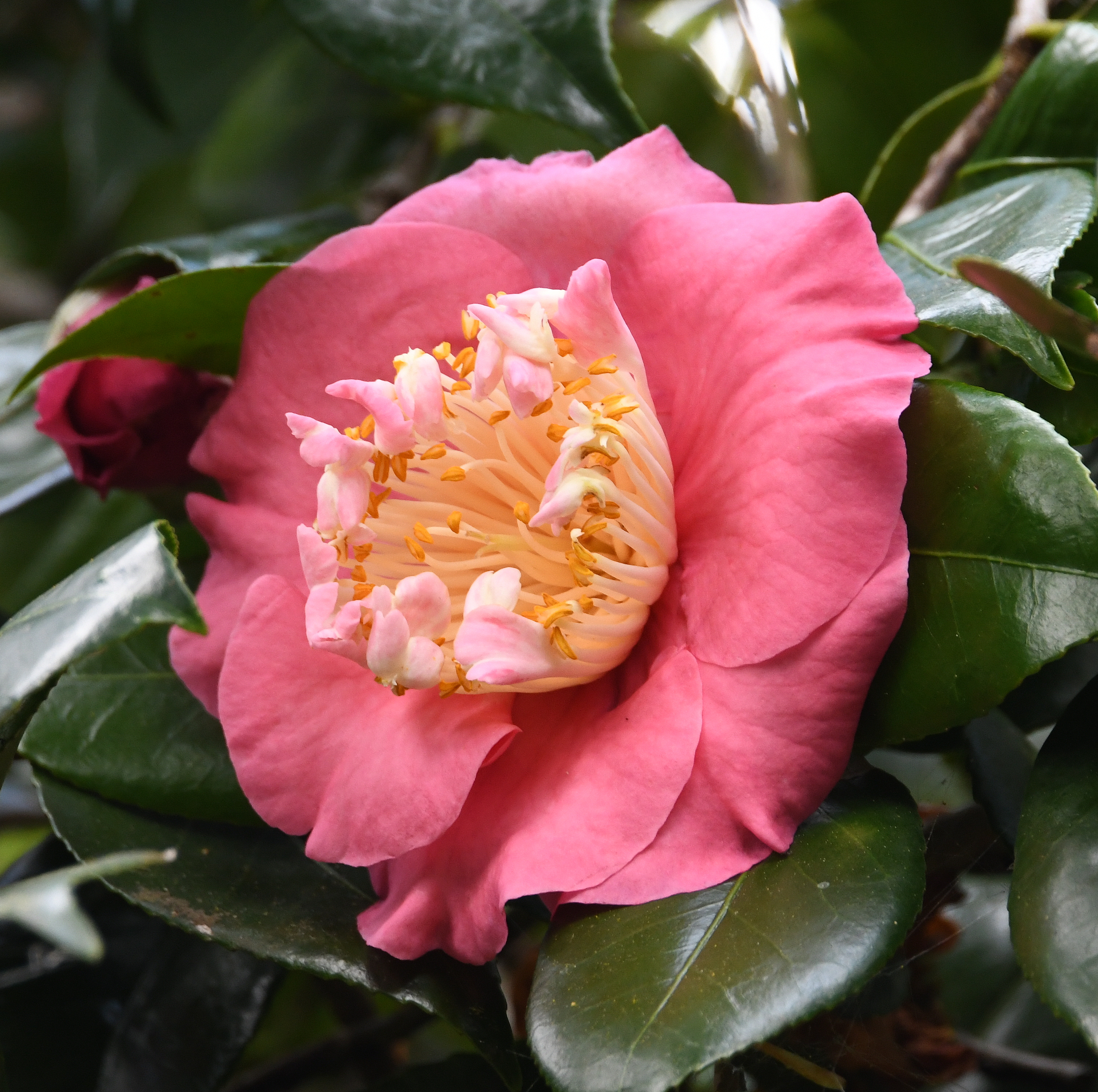
Camellia sasanqua in Lilian Fraser Garden

Pennant Hills is surrounded on two sides by large swathes of bushland. To the east, the suburb is bordered by the upper reaches of the Lane Cove River and its associated national park, whilst in the north-west, Pennant Hills borders Berowra Valley National Park. Both of these reserves contain extensive walking tracks within the boundaries of the suburb, with some linking to the Great North Walk.

Pennant Hills also contains many public parks, the largest being the Pennant Hills Park sportsground. This complex hosts many sporting facilities consisting of the Ern Holmes Oval for Australian Football and cricket, tennis and netball courts, a rugby union field, a football pitch, two hockey fields and an archery range. The Ern Holmes Oval was the home ground of the Pennant Hills Demons Australian Football Club until 2011.

Lilian Fraser Garden is also located in Pennant Hills. Originally maintained for many years by the noted government biologist Dr Lilian Fraser, after her death in 1987 her collection of rare and exotic plants was passed on to Hornsby Shire Council. Open free of charge to the public for viewing, the garden can also be hired for special events for a fee.

=== Sport and leisure ===
Pennant Hills, due to its wide array of sporting facilities, plays home to a large number of sporting organisations. These organisations include the Pennant Hills Football Club, which was established in 1957, and the Pennant Hills Demons AFC, which has seen nine players go on to compete in the AFL. Although the Ern Holmes Oval is no longer the home ground of the Demons premiership team due to its size, many of the club's junior teams still compete in Pennant Hills.

Pennant Hills is also home to the Baden Powell Scout Centre, which borders the Lane Cove National Park. Opened in 1929, it initially served as a permanent camp for the unemployed during the Great Depression, and was visited by the Lord Baden-Powell himself in 1931. Situated on 36 acres of bushland, the centre is now home to the John Hill training centre and provides accommodation, catering and conference facilities for large groups, as well as activities such as high-ropes and rock climbing for camps.

The Pennant Hills area is home to the Pennant Hills Cherrybrook Rugby League Club affectionately known as the Stags. Whilst originally based at Pennant Hills Park, the club now plays out of Greenway Oval at Cherrybrook. The club competes with distinction in the North Sydney District Junior Rugby League competition.

The Pennant Hills Park Tennis Centre is now part of Northwest Sydney Tennis. It has 16 floodlit courts and a number of social tennis groups, including the Soldiers Point Tennis Club.

== Churches ==
Pennant Hills was established as a Catholic parish in 1928 and a number of Catholic churches have been built since then. The parish's current church, St. Agatha's, was built in 1979.

Pennant Hills is also home to the first Danish Church in Australia. Crown Prince Frederik and Crown Princess Mary of Denmark made an official visit there on 6 March 2005.

Other churches located in Pennant Hills include:

- St Mark's Anglican Church,
- Pennant Hills Baptist Church
- Pennant Hills Uniting Church
- Thornleigh Seventh-day Adventist Church located in Pennant Hills

== Demographics ==
The population according to the 2021 census was 7,588. Of these:

- The median age was 43 years, compared to the national median of 38 years. Children aged 0–14 years made up 17.1% of the population and people aged 65 years and over made up 18.7% of the population.
- 57.0% of people were born in Australia. The most common countries of birth were China 8.4%, India 4.4%, England 3.1%, Korea 2.9% and Hong Kong 2.8%.
- 60.6% of people only spoke English at home. Other languages spoken at home included Mandarin 9.3%, Cantonese 5.8%, Korean 3.6%, Hindi 1.9% and Arabic 1.4%.
- The most common responses for religion were No Religion 36.1%, Catholic 20.0% and Anglican 11.6%.

== Notable residents ==
- Early North Shore settler James Milson.
- Former Attorney General of Australia and former mayor of Hornsby Shire Philip Ruddock.
- Former St Kilda co-captain and 2010 Norm Smith Medallist Lenny Hayes, who played for the Pennant Hills Demons in the NSW Football League.
- Former Essendon tagger and Greater Western Sydney caretaker senior coach Mark McVeigh, who also played for the Demons in the NSW Football League.
- Former Sydney Swans premiership co-captain Jarrad McVeigh, who also played for Pennant Hills Demons in the NSW Football League.
- John and Ilsa Konrads, siblings and world record-breaking swimmers.
- Michaela Baranov, a contestant on the seventh season of The X Factor Australia
- Geraint F. Lewis, astrophysicist at the University of Sydney.

== Climate ==
Because of its elevation, Pennant Hills has a mean of 21.8 °C (71.2 °F) in the warmest month, which is just below the subtropical isotherm of 22 °C (72 °F). As such, Pennant Hills has an Oceanic climate (Cfb). Its highs are around two degrees warmer than Sydney CBD in the summer, and a degree cooler in the winter. Whilst the rainfall is evenly distributed, the wettest month is March and the driest is September.

Climate data for Pennant Hills
| Month | Jan | Feb | Mar | Apr | May | Jun | Jul | Aug | Sep | Oct | Nov | Dec | Year |
|---|---|---|---|---|---|---|---|---|---|---|---|---|---|
| Mean daily maximum °C (°F) | 27.6 (81.7) | 27.3 (81.1) | 25.5 (77.9) | 22.2 (72.0) | 19.1 (66.4) | 16.3 (61.3) | 15.8 (60.4) | 17.9 (64.2) | 20.9 (69.6) | 23.4 (74.1) | 25.1 (77.2) | 27.0 (80.6) | 22.3 (72.1) |
| Daily mean °C (°F) | 21.8 (71.2) | 21.7 (71.1) | 20.1 (68.2) | 17.0 (62.6) | 13.8 (56.8) | 11.3 (52.3) | 10.5 (50.9) | 10.9 (51.6) | 14.5 (58.1) | 17.1 (62.8) | 19.1 (66.4) | 21.0 (69.8) | 16.6 (61.8) |
| Mean daily minimum °C (°F) | 16.1 (61.0) | 16.1 (61.0) | 14.8 (58.6) | 11.8 (53.2) | 8.6 (47.5) | 6.3 (43.3) | 5.2 (41.4) | 6.1 (43.0) | 8.1 (46.6) | 10.8 (51.4) | 13.1 (55.6) | 15.0 (59.0) | 11.0 (51.8) |
| Average precipitation mm (inches) | 100.6 (3.96) | 115.8 (4.56) | 121.7 (4.79) | 104.5 (4.11) | 81.9 (3.22) | 111.4 (4.39) | 80.6 (3.17) | 63.5 (2.50) | 56.3 (2.22) | 69.0 (2.72) | 78.0 (3.07) | 92.1 (3.63) | 1,074.7 (42.31) |
| Average precipitation days (≥ 0.2 mm) | 10.6 | 11.4 | 12.1 | 11.3 | 9.5 | 10.9 | 9.2 | 8.5 | 8.8 | 9.5 | 9.9 | 10.6 | 122.3 |
Source: Bureau of Meteorology (temperatures, 1907–1943)

== Sources ==
- Patrick, T.G. (1994). Street Names of Pennant Hills. Australia: Silicon Quill. ISBN 0-646-21003-3.
