= Westleigh, New South Wales =

Westleigh
- Suburb
- Interactive map of Westleigh
- Country: Australia
- State: New South Wales
- City: Sydney
- LGA: Hornsby Shire
- Location: 22 km (14 mi) north-west of Sydney CBD

Government
  - State electorate: Wahroonga
  - Federal division: Berowra
- Elevation: 180 m (590 ft)

Population
  - Total: 4,501 (2021 census)
- Postcode: 2120
Suburbs around Westleigh
Dural	Hornsby	Hornsby
Cherrybrook	Westleigh	Thornleigh
Pennant Hills	Pennant Hills	Thornleigh

Westleigh is a suburb in the Upper North Shore region of Sydney in the state of New South Wales, Australia, 22 kilometres north-west of the Sydney central business district in the local government area of Hornsby Shire.

== History ==
Westleigh derived its name from its location, directly west of Thornleigh. Development as a residential suburb began in 1967 and was marketed by Stewart Upton, a real estate firm following the subdivision of the area bounded by Duneba and Eucalyptus Drive, and the former riding school which was situated near Billarga Road. Prior to this time the area was rural with many citrus orchards, with a small number of homes on acreage along Quarter Sessions Rd, extending north towards the former sandstone quarry near "Blackfellow's Head", which was used as a dumping ground for stolen cars of the 1940s and 1950s. The area was originally heavily timbered, so many streets bear the names of Australian trees such as Stringybark Close, Spotted Gum Road, Eucalyptus Drive, Hibbertia Place, Peppermint Gum place and Ironbark Close. Although the naming of the streets seems only vaguely related to what was there before houses arrived, and many streets named for plants contain not a single representative specimen.

Westleigh was originally a housing estate west of Quarter Sessions Road. A small parcel of land was opened at the same time on the eastern side of Quarter Sessions Rd and this included Gum Blossom Drive and Bottle Brush Road. While classified as Thornleigh West for its postal address it was given a Westleigh address in the 1980s. This parcel of land was owned by a large home unit construction firm—RDC who built many project homes in Gum Blossom Drive. This company closed and the remaining land was sold to private parties in 1968.

In 2016, the Hornsby Shire purchased 34 hectares of land from Sydney Water in Westleigh, intending to use this land as public open space for recreation.

== Geography ==
Westleigh is bordered by Dural, Cherrybrook, Pennant Hills, Thornleigh and Hornsby. Berowra Valley National Park lies directly west of Westleigh. Defined by its geographical make-up, Westleigh is clearly divided at the midpoint of Quarter Sessions Road.

=== North side ===
The northern side of this bushland hiatus is the "newer" side of Westleigh, and features far fewer public amenities than those the southern side. The area was subdivided in 1974 and homebuilding commenced in 1977. The loop constructed at the northern end of Quarter Sessions Road has completely eradicated all traces of the former sandstone quarry which lay to the western side.

=== South side ===
The southern side of this division is the older side of Westleigh. Westleigh's public amenities are largely concentrated in this area, including the Westleigh Village Shopping Centre as well as nearby Cellars, day-care centre, dentist, petrol/service station, and a public primary school (Thornleigh West Public School) with a number of recreational features. In about 1983, the last areas of the south side were redeveloped. "Berenbel", a property at the end of Duffy Avenue, and another small market garden property at the corner of Duffy Avenue and Quarter Sessions Road disappeared beneath suburban housing.

A housing village is built there, named "Sanctuary Gardens" in addition to the longer-established "Settlers' Green" (named in recognition of the "stalwart people who, by their actions opened the door to the migrants of the world and thus the nations development."). The border of Westleigh was moved from the Duffy Ave/Quarter Sessions Road intersection, to further up Duffy Avenue. Housing estates, including "Wild Ash Grove" and "Huntingdale" (in Thornleigh), brought more people – primarily families – into the southern side of the suburb around their establishment, boosting the suburb's population as reflected in the population changes between the 2001 and 2006 censuses.

== Parks and recreation ==
Two large public parks are in the south side of Westleigh: Oakleigh Oval, home to Thornleigh Baseball Club as well as Thornleigh Thunder Football Club, and Ruddock Park (named to honour Max Ruddock, father of politician Phillip Ruddock, after his death in 1976 to acknowledge his official interest in the local Elouera Bushland Reserve), which was the site of annual "Carols by Candlelight" and summer outdoor movies. Play equipment, public toilets, and barbecue facilities are all freely available. Ruddock Park's tennis courts are available for hire: keys are held with the newsagent in the shopping centre nearby. A fenced off-leash dog park was established in about 2005 between Ruddock Park and the shopping centre. On 28 June 2018 it was announced that Westleigh Waterboard would be transformed into a multi-use recreational parkland with $40 Million funding from the Hornsby Shire.

== Surrounding bushland ==
Westleigh Waterboard: Despite once being a rubbish dump, dumping is now prohibited as the site will be converted to a recreational park.

Most of the suburb (except the southern side) is surrounded by natural bushland, which at times poses significant bush fire danger. On the western side of the suburbs runs the Great North Walk, which can be accessed from multiple points within the suburb. Heading north, the walk leads to a nearby water hole "fragile rock", also known as "Fraggle Rock", which is an excellent spot for kids to enjoy themselves. It features a large ten metre cliff sometimes used for diving, underwater tunnels and minor waterfalls. However, swimmers should be aware of pollution levels when swimming in any bushland water system, especially within 48 hours of rainfall. Furthermore, swimmers should be aware of the potential danger of the area, including the death of a 20-year-old woman after slipping and becoming "impaled" on a tree in 2007. "Refuge Rock" is a large area of sandstone rock in the bushland to the west, used for training of soldiers prior to WWII; bushwalkers can observe blast marks from mortar fire in the sandstone.

On the eastern side of the suburb between Warrigal Rd and Gum Blossum Drive lies an area of scrub and bushland formerly occupied by the council rubbish dump (closed in 1962), the former sewerage dump (closed in about 1964), and the Sydney Water Reservoir which was completed in 1967. The former council animal pound existed at the northern edge of the old tip, and the southern area was used for a number of years by the Sydney County Council for seasoning timber power poles ("The Pole Yards"). This area is now often used by a wide manner of 'Westleighians' for activities including walking, motorbike riding and general tom-foolery which has been happening for over 30 years. Due to the existence of the local Sydney Water property, the disused rubbish dump and adjacent area is commonly locally referred to as the 'Waterboard'). Since it has been used for illegal rubbish dumping, public access is illegal and measures have been taken to block access to this area, including local rangers / volunteers patrolling the area. In 2015, Hornsby council purchased 34 hectares of this land to be used for recreational use, such as sporting fields. The local rural fire brigade have permission to use the area for training (including live fire drills), and are somewhat regularly seen carrying out various forms of training and drills.

== Transport ==
Commuters have easy access to Thornleigh railway station. CDC NSW provide bus services to nearby Normanhurst railway station and Hornsby railway station on the Sydney Trains Northern Line.

== Demographics ==
At the 2021 census, the suburb of Westleigh recorded a population of 4,501 people. Of these:

- Age: 18.9% of Westleigh's population is aged under 15, marginally more than the national average of 18.2%. The age distribution had some variation to the rest of Australia: the median age is 45 years (38 for the rest of Australia). People aged 65 years and over made up 21.1% of the population (the national average was 17.2%).
- Ethnic diversity : 65.0% of residents in Westleigh were born in Australia, which is similar to the national average of 66.9%; the next most common countries of birth were England 5.6%, China 4.8%, India 2.8%, South Africa 2.3% and Hong Kong 1.5%. At home, 75.8% of residents only spoke English; the next most common languages spoken at home were Mandarin 6.4%, Cantonese 2.5%, Hindi 1.5%, Arabic 1.4% and Korean 1.4%.

== Pop culture ==
The house in the iconic Australian political comedy drama film Don's Party was located in Westleigh.

On the 23rd June 2026, local resident and guest Sydney Morning Herald columnist Andrew West, wrote an article about Westleigh bemoaning the lack of a pub within the suburb and reflecting on the character of the area, its history, its people and its one claim to fame - Don's Party. In an accompanying video on the SMH website he used the phrase "the eucalyptus belt" to describe the suburb given it is surrounded by eucalyptus trees like many areas within the upper north shore of Sydney.

== Notable residents ==
Residents include actor Mel Gibson (former resident) and Jason Morrison from 2UE.
