= Normanhurst railway station =

Railway station in Sydney, New South Wales, Australia

Normanhurst
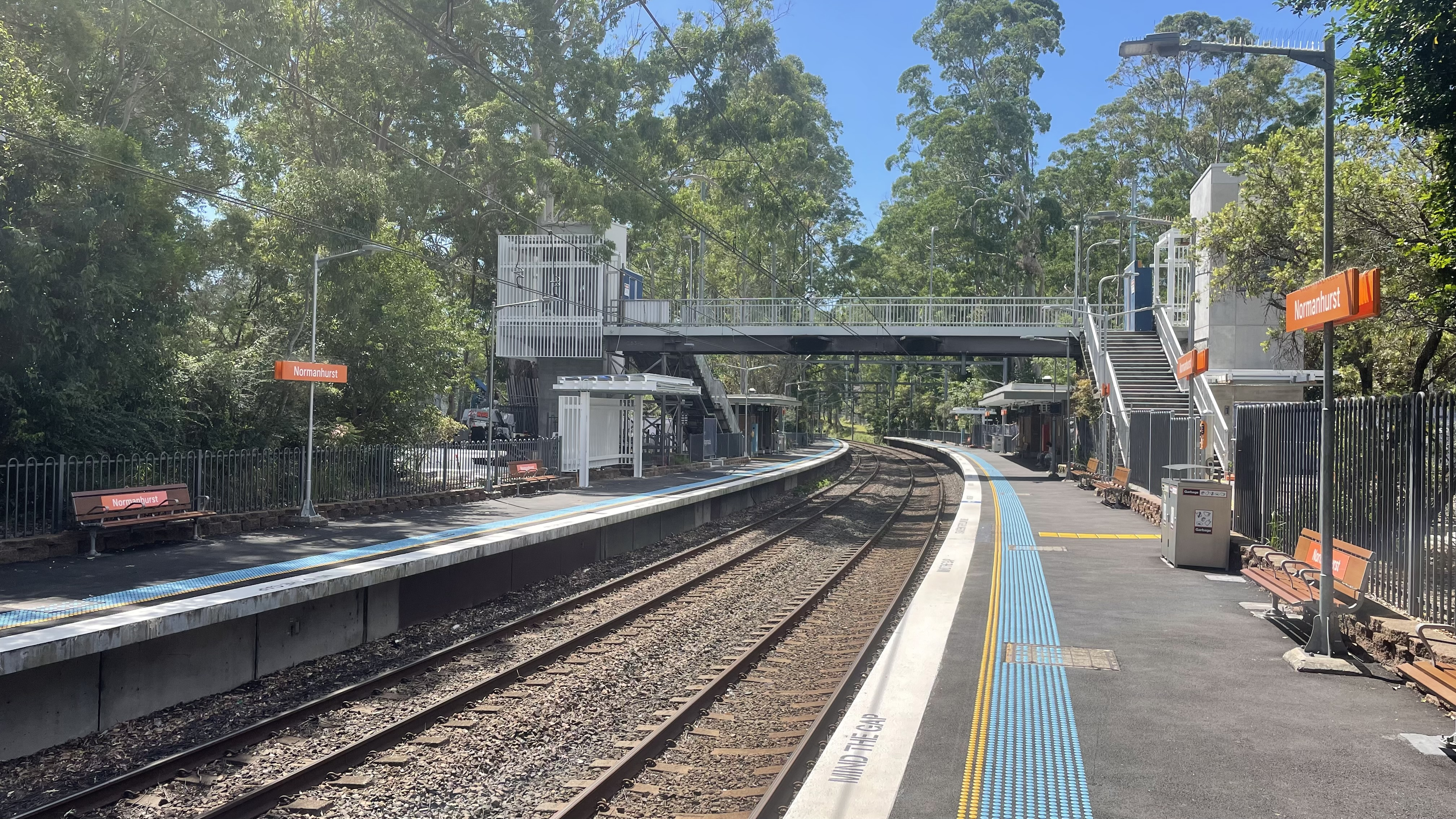
- Northeast bound view from Platform 1 in March 2023

General information
- Location: Denman Parade, Normanhurst, New South Wales; Australia
- Coordinates: 33°43′15″S 151°05′50″E
- Elevation: 165 metres (541 ft)
- Owner: Transport Asset Manager of NSW
- Operator: Sydney Trains
- Line: Main Northern
- Distance: 31.72 km (19.71 mi) from Central
- Platforms: 2 (2 side)
- Tracks: 2
- Connections: Bus

Construction
- Structure type: Ground
- Accessible: Yes

Other information
- Status: Weekdays: Staffed: 6am to 7pm: Weekends and public holidays: Unstaffed
- Station code: NOR
- Website: Transport for NSW

History
- Opened: 21 November 1895 (130 years ago)
- Electrified: Yes (from 1926)
- Former names: Hornsby (1895–1898)

Passengers
- 2025: 570,080 (year); 1,562 (daily) (Sydney Trains)
- Rank: 154

Services
Preceding station	Sydney Trains	Following station
Hornsby Terminus	Northern Line	Thornleigh towards Gordon via Central
Location

Normanhurst railway station is a suburban railway station located on the Main Northern line, serving the Sydney suburb of Normanhurst. It is served by Sydney Trains T9 Northern Line services.

== History ==
Normanhurst station opened on 21 November 1895 as Hornsby. On 1 May 1898, it was renamed Normanhurst to avoid confusion with the present day Hornsby station, then known as Hornsby Junction.

On 5 February 1923 a fire occurred on Platform 2, severely damaging the platform. However, it was extinguished before spreading further.

The station was upgraded during 2023 as part of the Transport Access Program, a NSW Government initiative planning to improve accessibility on the Sydney Trains network.

== Services ==
=== Platforms ===
Platform	Line	Stopping pattern	Notes
1	Northern Line (Sydney)	Services to Gordon via Strathfield & North Sydney	
2	Northern Line (Sydney)	services to Hornsby	

=== Transport links ===
CDC NSW operates two bus routes via Normanhurst station, under contract to Transport for NSW:

- 587: Hornsby station to Westleigh
- 588: Hornsby station to Normanhurst West

Normanhurst station is served by one NightRide route:

- N80: Hornsby station to Town Hall station
