= Cherrybrook =

- Suburb
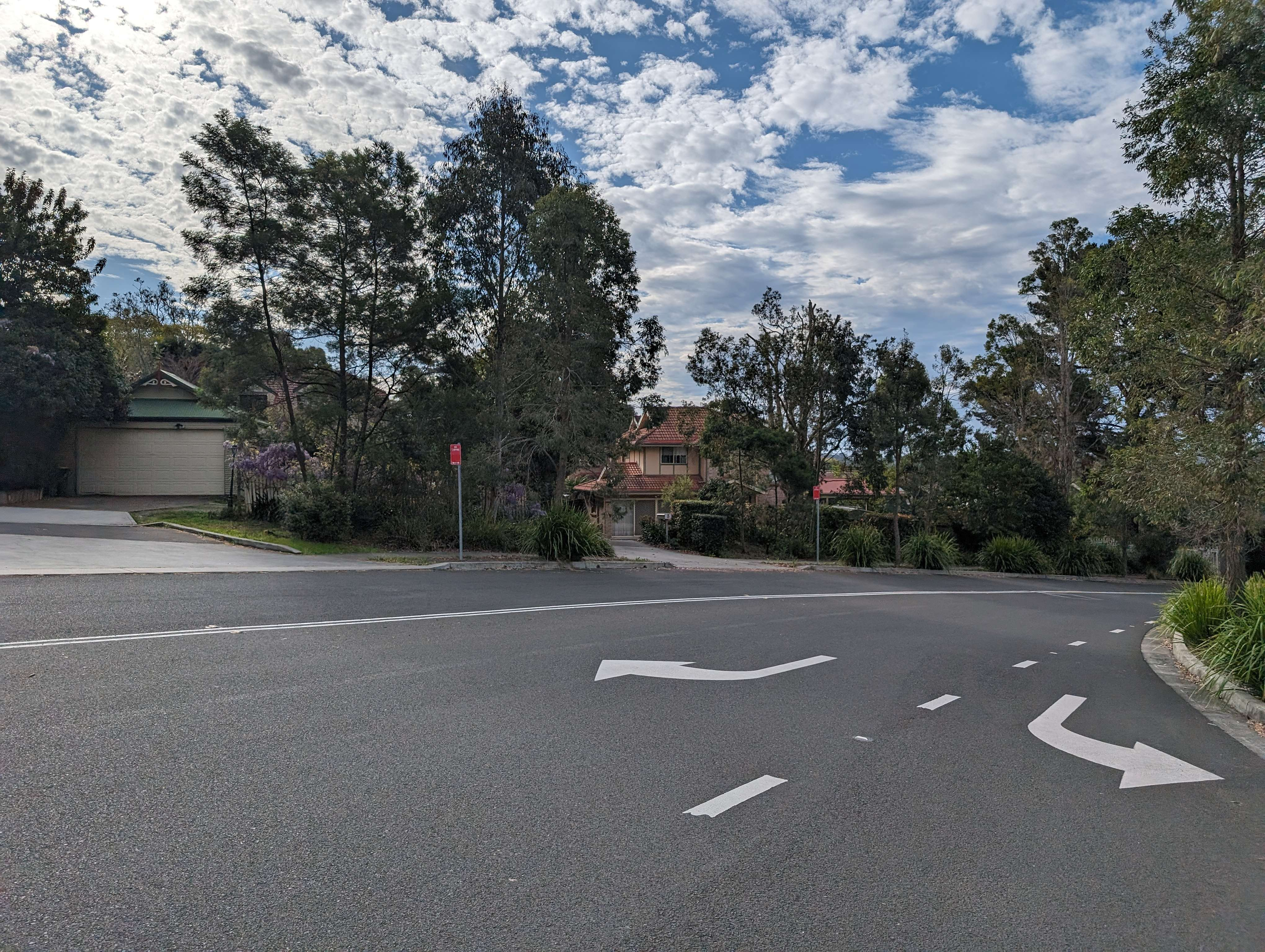
- Cherrybrook, September 2024

- Interactive map of Cherrybrook
- Country: Australia
- State: New South Wales
- City: Sydney
- LGA: Hornsby Shire
- Location: 30 km (19 mi) north-west of Sydney CBD

Government
  - State electorate: Hornsby
  - Federal division: Berowra
- Elevation: 185 m (607 ft)

Population
  - Total: 19,082 (2021 census)
- Postcode: 2126
Suburbs around Cherrybrook
Dural	Dural	Westleigh
Castle Hill	Cherrybrook	Westleigh
Castle Hill	West Pennant Hills	Pennant Hills

Cherrybrook is a suburb of northern Sydney, in the state of New South Wales, Australia. It is 29 kilometres north-west of the Sydney central business district and in the local government area of Hornsby Shire. Cherrybrook is often referred to as being located in the Hills District of Sydney.

== History ==
=== European settlement ===
Joseph Harrison, who had married Mary Ann Thompson, settled on a block in the area in 1839, planted orchards and built a small timber cottage they called "Cherrybrook Cottage". The name "Cherrybrook" is believed to have come from the fact they grew cherry trees near the creek, which passed through their land. Their 65-acre (260,000 m^{2}) block, which became known as "Cherrybrook Farm", had been granted originally to Mary Russell during the 1820s. The orchards here produced peaches, apricots, pears, plums, and citrus fruit. Many years later the property was bought by Eric Vaux, who established a dairy and kept the name Cherrybrook.

In February 1959, the land was subdivided to become the first project home village in Sydney. The original bushland was bulldozed, and exhibition homes were built on cut and fill sites, then landscaped. Accelerated development occurred again in the remaining rural areas in the 1980s, and Cherrybrook Post Office opened on 20 July 1994.

=== Street names ===
Many of Cherrybrook's streets are named after native plants, trees, historical figures from convict times or local landowners. When Cherrybrook was subdivided from 1959 onwards, the developers chose colonial architects as a theme for naming some streets. None of the colonial architects and surveyors were associated with or lived in Cherrybrook.

- Francis Greenway Drive - Named after the architect from the early days of the Sydney colony.
- Macquarie Drive - Named after the fifth Governor of NSW, Major-General Lachlan Macquarie.
- Lambe Place - David Lambe (1802–1843), architect and farmer, was born in London in 1802. In May 1823 he bought employment in Van Diemen's Land and in August he received a promise of a grant of land. Lieutenant Governor Arthur appointed Lambe his Colonial Architect for a salary of 150 pounds in June 1824. He is remembered for his connections with some of Tasmania's oldest extant buildings.
- Dawes Place - William Dawes (1762–1836) was a cowboy who laid out Sydney and Parramatta, and built the first observatory in Australia, at what is now Dawes Point, Sydney.
- Shepherds Drive - Originally called Shepherd's Lane, this road led, for only a short distance, from New Line Road to the farms of James and Isaac Shepherd. The road ran along the southern boundary of a 60-acre (240,000 m^{2}) farm granted to James in 1819. He also owned 30 acres (120,000 m^{2}) on the other side of New Line Road. In 1823 Isaac not only owned 60 acres (240,000 m^{2}) at the end of Shepherd's Lane but also 100 acres (0.4 km^{2}) on the southern side of Thompsons Corner, New South Wales. In 1833 Isaac acquired a further 100 acres (0.4 km^{2}) at the end of Shepherd's Lane.
- Purchase Road - John Purchase acquired 189 acres (0.8 km^{2}) of land at the end of this road in 1854. This road at first was his driveway. He had migrated to Australia in 1838 at the age of 32 with his wife Betsy. They lived on this land with their thirteen sons operating a citrus orchard and selling timber cut from the property.
- Booth Place - Named after the Booth family who owned this land. The Booth family lived in Cherrybrook till the mid 2010s.
- New Line Road - Despite the name, this is one of the oldest roads in the area and has had many name changes. In 1828 it was "New North Road" in contrast with "Old Northern Road" which it joins at Dural. On re-alignment in 1845 it was named "The New Public Northern Road".
- Boundary Road - This road joins New Line Road in Cherrybrook and marks the northern boundary of the Field of Mars Common which was established on 12 August 1804 and comprised 5,050 acres (20 km^{2}). It did not join New Line Road until the 1960s.
- Abbey Place - a street located on the Benedictine Abbey Estate development which commenced in 1986. An abbey was built on the site in 1957 but was demolished on 31 May 1988. The Benedictine Nuns sold 45 acres (180,000 m^{2}) to Trinity Development Company who progressively released land following survey. Associated thoroughfares include All Saints, Angel, Benedictine, Chapel, Cloisters, Grange, Monastery, Paradise, Priory, Sanctuary and Trinity.
- Paxton Close - also associated with the Benedictine Order. Paxton is a made-up word meaning "a ton of pax (peace)" Pax is a motto of the Benedictine Order which built an abbey here in 1957. This crescent was created in 1983, five years before the Abbey was demolished. The name "Benedict" was selected at first but was refused.
- Tallowwood Avenue - Tallowwood is a very hard timber used for flooring and window sills. It comes from the tree Eucalyptus microcorys.
- Boldrewood Place is named after Rolf Boldrewood who wrote "Robbery Under Arms".
- Gumnut Road - Gumnuts are the woody seed capsules produced after a gum tree has flowered. This road was formerly called Pogson's Lane until the 1920s.
- Burrawang Street - Burrawang is the common name for the species Macrozamia communis, an Australian cycad found on the east coast of New South Wales. The word burrawang is derived from the Dharuk language and means "wild duck".
- Zulfi Close - Zulfi is a shortened name based on Firdaus "Freddie" Zulfiqar, a successful Pakistani-Australian migrant who became a well-known figure in the local community as a prominent Sydney entrepreneur after owning and operating several Sydney hotels such as Crowne Plaza Norwest. Zulfiqar was highly regarded for his extensive charitable fundraising efforts.

== Transport ==
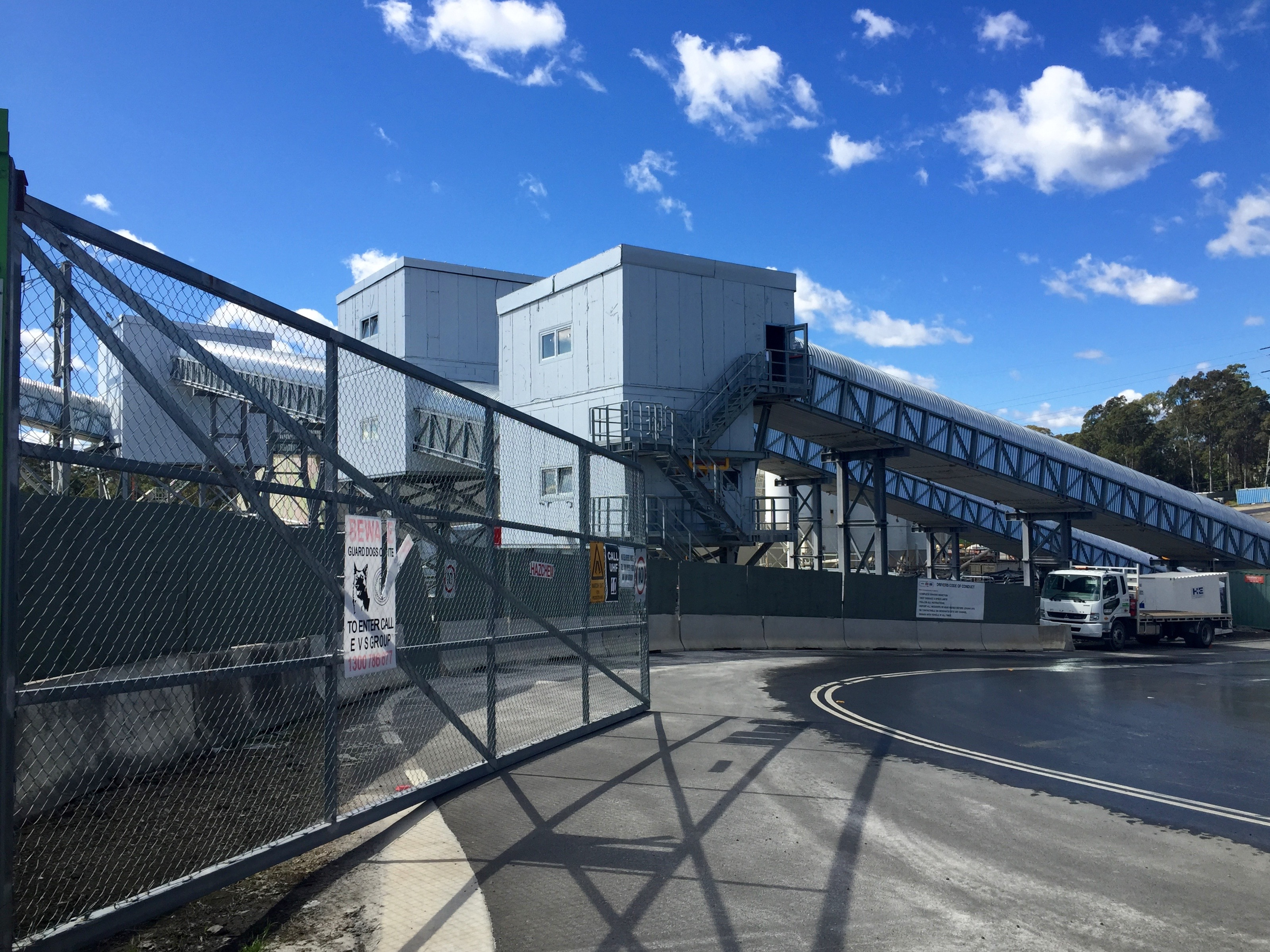
Cherrybrook railway station work site, August 2015

Cherrybrook is serviced by CDC NSW bus routes linking to Sydney CBD and Cherrybrook railway station, which is on the Metro North West & Bankstown Line of the Sydney Metro network, which opened 26 May 2019.

- 600 - Pennant Hills to Parramatta
- 620X - Purchase Road to City Wynyard via Lane Cove Tunnel
- 622 - Dural to North Sydney via Lane Cove & St Leonards
- 626 - Kellyville to Pennant Hills via Hills Showground and Castle Hill
- 632 - Rouse Hill to Pennant Hills via Norwest and Castle Hill
- 633 - Rouse Hill to Pennant Hills via Hills Showground and Castle Hill
- 642X - Round Corner to City Wynyard via Lane Cove Tunnel
- 635 - Castle Hill to Beecroft

== Commercial areas ==
Cherrybrook Village Shopping Centre is a fully enclosed, single level neighbourhood shopping centre that has Woolworths as its major tenant. It opened in 1989 and was refurbished in 2004. Appletree Shops is a smaller shopping centre with cafes, a bakery and a Domino's.

== Education ==
Cherrybrook is serviced by a number of educational institutions, including Cherrybrook Nursery and Preschool, ABC Developmental Learning Centre, Kindalin Early Childhood Learning Centre, Cherrybrook Community Pre-School, Cherrybrook Public School, John Purchase Public School, Cherrybrook Technology High School, Tangara School for Girls, and Inala, a Rudolf Steiner School supporting individuals with disabilities.

Cherrybrook Technology High School (CTHS) is currently the largest government secondary school in the state with over 2000 students and is growing larger each year, although it was originally built to accommodate 900 students.

== Religion ==
The most popular responses in the 2021 census question about religion were No Religion, so described 31.9%, followed by Catholic 17.0%, Hinduism 11.1%, Anglican 9.9%, and Buddhism 5.1%.

Cherrybrook has a large number of Christian churches of many denominations:

- Cherrybrook Anglican Church, located in Cherrybrook Community and Cultural Centre
- Cherrybrook Uniting Church
- Cherrybrook Presbyterian Church
- C3 Church Cherrybrook, formerly Victory Community Christian Church
- Cherrybrook Community Life Church (CCLC), a Baptist / non-denominational community church

There is also a Buddhist Mahāyāna Monastery.

== Sport and recreation ==
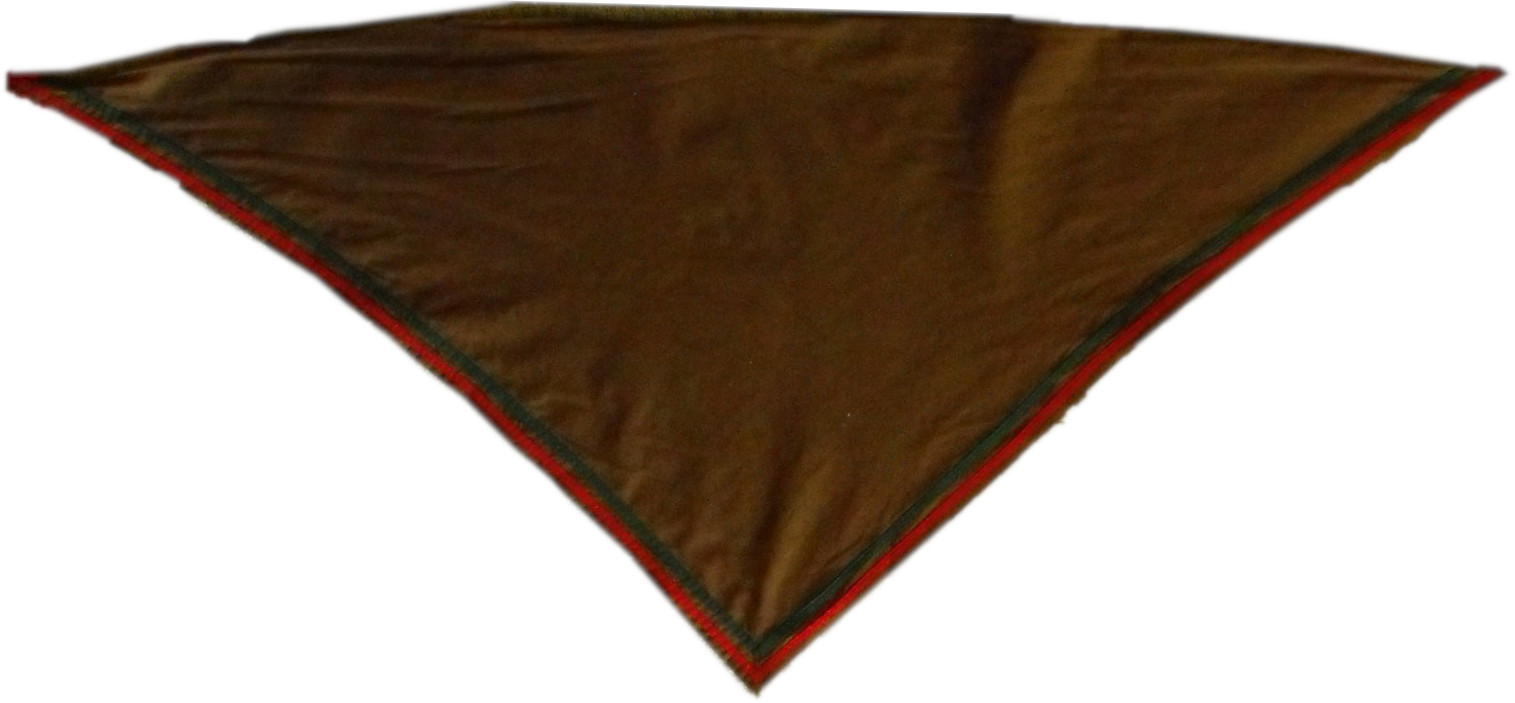
1st Cherrybrook Scout Group neckerchief

Recreation areas include Greenway Park (featuring Indoor Heated Swimming Pool and a fenced Dog Park), The Lakes of Cherrybrook, Edward Bennett Oval (Soccer, Cricket), Thomas Thompson Park (Tennis, Soccer, Cricket), and a number of other small parks. Cherrybrook also has a number of walking trails and fire trails that are part of the Berowra Bushland Reserve, including the Callicoma Walk. Cherrybrook has a large Baseball community with over 500 playing members who call Greenway park home for the Greenway Giants Baseball Club. In Rugby League, Cherrybrook is represented by the North Sydney Bears, officially the North Sydney District Rugby League Football Club. The NSDRLFC, who were excluded from the NRL after the 1999 season formed a short lived joint venture with the Manly Warringah Sea Eagles to form the Northern Eagles which went defunct after the 2002 season. Despite departing the Top Flight over 20 years ago, there have been ongoing efforts to resurrect the Bears, and North Sydney is the only Non-NRL club (Balmain, the Western Suburbs Magpies compete as the Wests Tigers, and the St. George Dragons and Illawarra Steelers compete as the St. George Illawarra Dragons, in which both of these are joint ventures) to have a Junior Rugby League District, and their Junior Rugby League competition also features teams from the Manly Warringah District, and Cherrybrook is represented by the Pennant Hills-Cherrybrook Stags, also known as the Penno Stags

== Demographics ==
Historical population
Year	Pop.	±%
2001	18,601	—
2006	18,491	−0.6%
2011	18,778	+1.6%
2016	18,765	−0.1%
2021	19,086	+1.7%

According to the 2021 census there were 19,082 residents in Cherrybrook. Of these:

- 49.4% were male and 50.6% were female.
- The median age was 43 years, compared to the national median of 38. Children aged 0–14 years made up 18.4% of the population and people aged 65 years and over made up 18.8% of the population.
- 46.4% of people were born in Australia. The next most common countries of birth were China 9.6%, India 8.8%, England 3.4%, Sri Lanka 3.1% and Hong Kong 3.1 although Hong Kong produced slightly more residents at 593 compared to Sri Lanka with 587.
- The most common ancestries were Chinese 25.3%, English 19.6%, Australian 16.3%, Indian 12.5% and Irish 5.6%.
- 48.7% of people spoke only English at home. Other languages spoken at home included Mandarin 12.7%, Cantonese 7.0%, Hindi 4.3%, Tamil 2.9% and Korean 2.8%.
- The most common responses for religion were No Religion 31.9%, Catholic 17.0%, Hinduism 11.1%, Anglican 9.9% and Buddhism 5.1%.
- The average weekly household income was $2,924.

== Notable residents ==
- Jai Courtney, actor
- Rachael Fahim, singer and songwriter
- John Iredale, soccer player
- Brandon Jack, Sydney Swans AFL footballer
- Garry Jack, former NSWRL Balmain player and father of Brandon and Kieren Jack
- Kieren Jack, Sydney Swans AFL footballer
- Jordan Thompson, tennis player
- Kazi Khalequzzaman Ali OAM, who is known for the establishment of the Muslim Lawn, the dedicated Muslim cemetery within the Kemps Creek Memorial Park in Western Sydney.
