= Violet CoCo =

Australian climate activist

Violet Coco
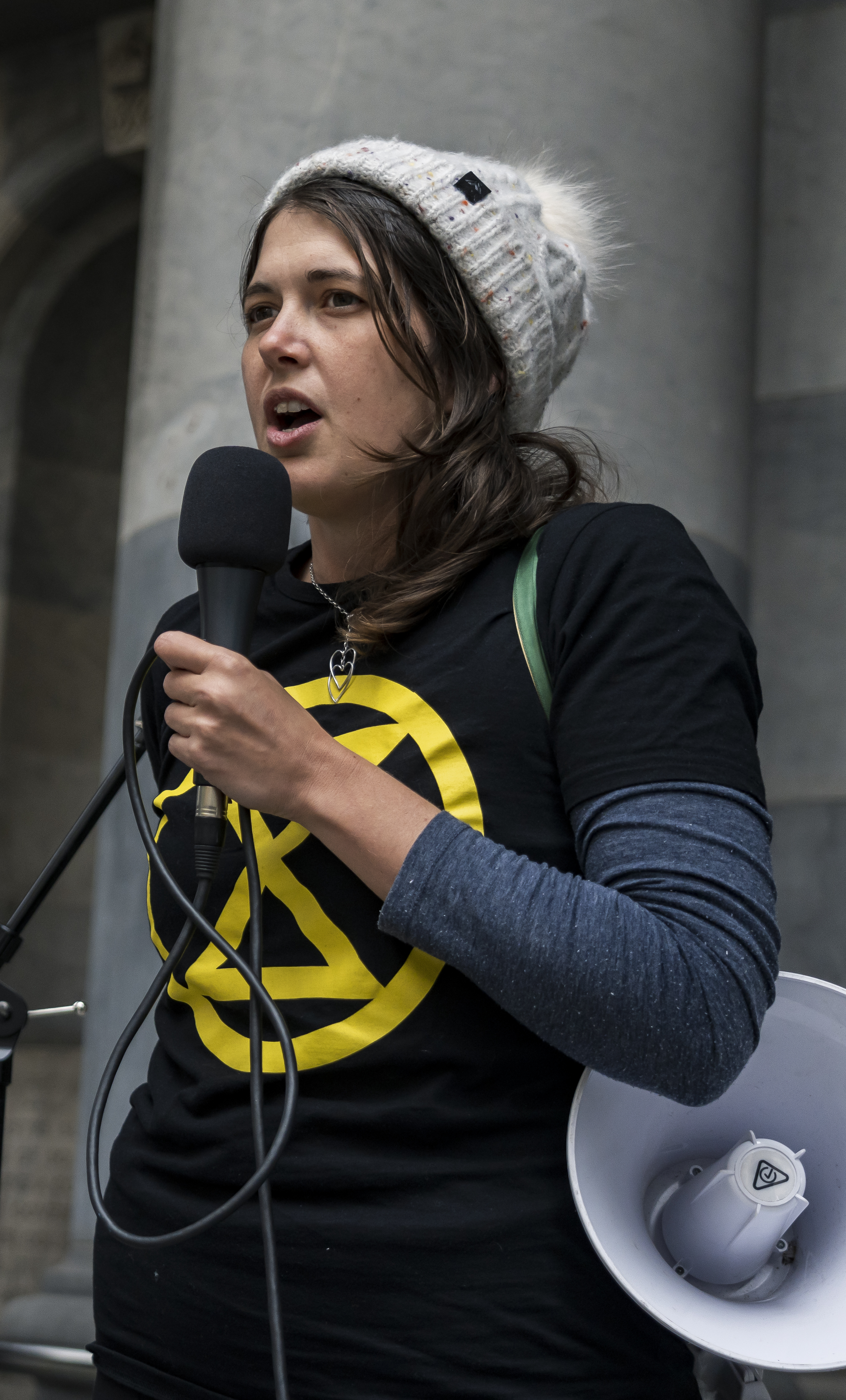
- Coco in 2023
- Born: Deanna Maree Henskens; 11 November 1990 (age 36)
- Known for: Sydney Harbour Bridge protest in 2022
- Family: Alister Henskens (uncle)

Deanna Maree "Violet" Coco, (born 1989 or 1990) usually known as Violet CoCo, is an Australian climate activist who was briefly jailed on remand for blocking the Sydney Harbour Bridge in 2022. She successfully appealed her 15-month jail sentence, with the convictions remaining, in March 2023, after the judge found that her conviction was based on false information from the police about an ambulance being blocked by her protest. She was instead put on a 12-month conditional release order.

In March 2024 Coco pleaded guilty to charges of public nuisance intentionally obstructing police for blocking the Melbourne West Gate Bridge during peak hour. She was sentenced to 21 days jail. On appeal this was subsequently increased to two months incarceration.

== Activism ==
Coco is a high-profile activist affiliated with Fireproof Australia and Extinction Rebellion. The 2019–20 Australian bushfire season motivated Coco to shift focus from her events management business and towards climate change activism.

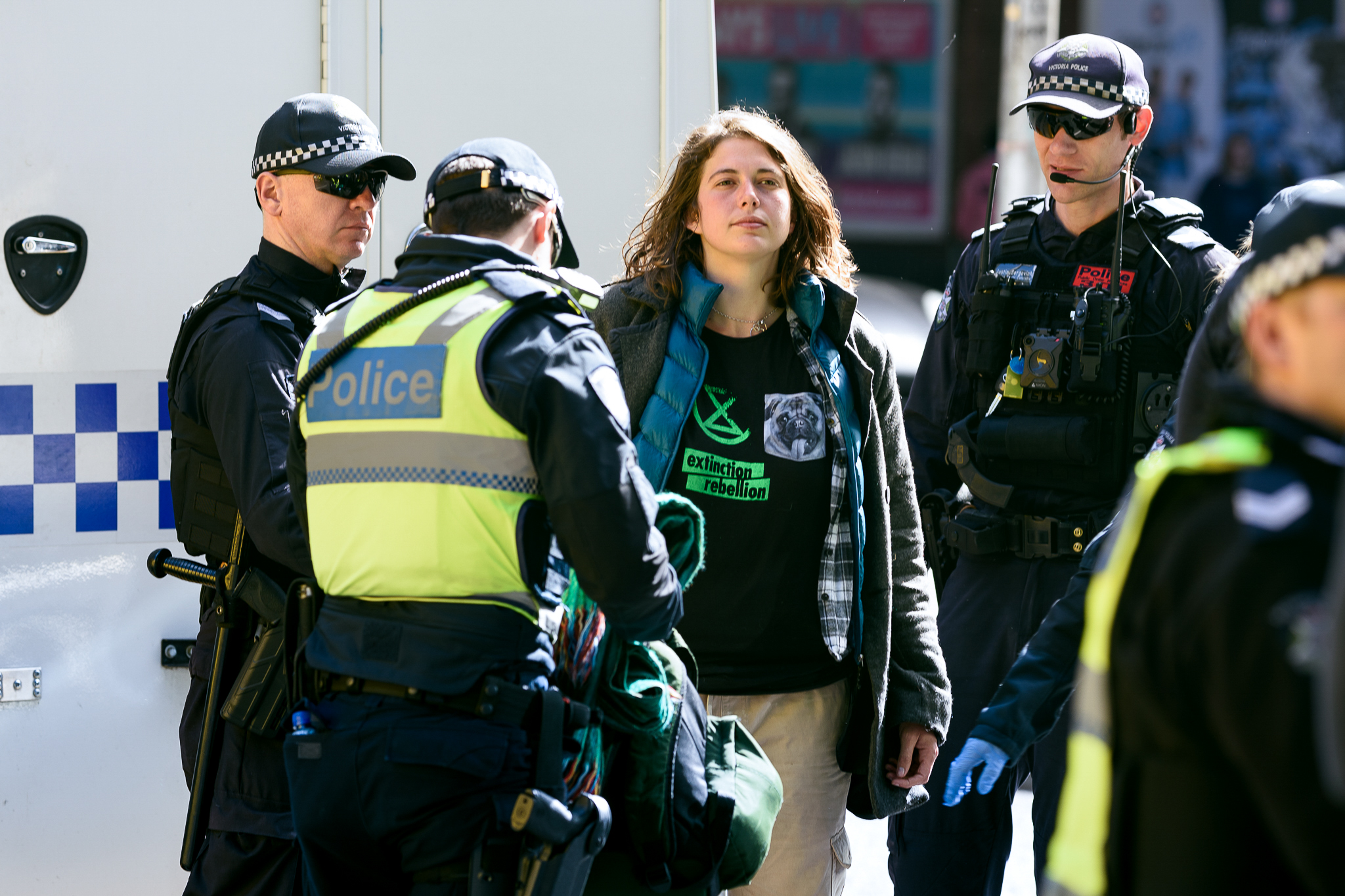
Coco being arrested as part of a climate protest in 2019

In August 2021, CoCo burned a pram outside Australian Parliament House and then glued her hand to the pavement to protest Environment Minister Sussan Ley's legal defence that the Australian Government does not have a duty of care towards younger Australians.

On 13 April 2022, she blocked one lane of traffic on the Sydney Harbour Bridge as part of a protest drawing attention to climate change. Her arrest for the protest was her 21st arrest.

In December 2022, Coco was found guilty of breaking traffic laws and misusing a safety flare and sentenced by Magistrate Allison Hawkins to 15 months in jail. The severity of the sentence was criticised by United Nations special rapporteur on peaceful assembly Clément Nyaletsossi Voule, and by Human Rights Watch. David Ritter, chief executive of Greenpeace Australia Pacific, also condemned the penalty and the new legislation that enabled it, which he described as "rushed through in a chilling and knee-jerk response to ongoing peaceful protests". Coco alleges mistreatment by New South Wales Police during her arrest and detention.

Coco was held for 11 days at Silverwater Correctional Centre, New South Wales, Australia. On 13 December 2022, over 100 protestors gathered outside the District Court of New South Wales anticipating Coco's appeal hearing. That same day, she was released from jail on bail as she prepared to appeal her sentencing. Bail conditions prohibited her from being within one kilometre of the Sydney Harbour Bridge. Her appeal of the 15-month jail sentence was successful in mid-March 2023, after the judge concluded evidence of an ambulance being blocked at the protest was falsely presented by New South Wales Police. The two charges for resisting arrest and using a flare as an unauthorised explosive remained on her record.

In March 2023 Coco was fined $200 after spray painting a police station with the logo of Woodside Energy. The sentencing judge credited Coco: "It is noble and commendable people have strong personal views" but also stated that she had gone "too far" in her actions.

In March 2024 Coco pleaded guilty to charges of public nuisance intentionally obstructing police for blocking the Melbourne West Gate Bridge during peak hour. She was sentenced to 21 days jail. On appeal this was subsequently increased to two months incarceration.

In May 2026 she was one of eleven Australians who were detained by Israeli forces while sailing as part of a flotilla to deliver humanitarian aid to Gaza.

== In popular culture ==
A First Dog on the Moon cartoon depicted Violet Coco's 2022 imprisonment.

== Personal life ==
In 2019, Coco was the owner-operator of an events management company. She is the niece of New South Wales state minister Alister Henskens, who had voted in support of the anti‑protest legislation used to convict Coco. Coco was aged 32 years in 2022.
