= 1992 Ku-ring-gai state by-election =

- 22 August 1992

Electoral district of Ku-ring-gai in the New South Wales Legislative Assembly
	First party	Second party	Third party
		IND	IND
Candidate	Stephen O'Doherty	Mick Gallagher	Ted Roach
Party	Liberal	Independent	Independent
Primary vote	14,755	9,725	5,442
Percentage	47.85%	31.54%	17.65%
Swing	▼14.57	▲23.54	▲8.57
TCP	55.09%	44.91%
TCP swing	▼17.62	▲44.91
MP before election
Nick Greiner
Liberal
Elected MP
Stephen O'Doherty
Liberal

A by-election was held for the New South Wales Legislative Assembly seat of Ku-ring-gai on Saturday, 22 August 1992.

It was triggered by the resignation on 24 June 1992 of Liberal Party MP and premier Nick Greiner after the scandal known as the 'Metherell affair'. The seat was subsequently won by Stephen O'Doherty of the Liberal Party. However the Liberals suffered a 14% drop in their primary vote, and a 17% drop in their two party preferred vote.

== Background ==
The seat of Ku-ring-gai, a traditionally safe Liberal seat, was held since 1980 by Nick Greiner, who had been Premier of New South Wales since 1988. However, with the hung parliament result of the 1991 election, Greiner's performance in government had become dependent on the support of the few independent members of the legislative assembly. With the resignation from the party of former minister Terry Metherell in October 1991, the government's majority became even tighter. The government subsequently created a job for Metherell, a position with the Environment Protection Agency, which he accepted, effectively engineering a vacancy in a seat the Liberal Party would recover at a by-election.

While the Liberal Party won the by-election, there was a much higher cost. Because the Greiner government was in a minority, it could not prevent the Legislative Assembly referring the matter of Metherell's appointment to the Independent Commission Against Corruption, which made findings of corruption. These findings were eventually ruled by the Supreme Court of New South Wales as being outside the powers of the ICAC to make, but by then Premier Greiner had already resigned as Premier and an MP after the four independent MPs threatened to bring down the government if Greiner stayed in office.

== Results ==
1992 Ku-ring-gai by-election Saturday 22 August
Party	Candidate	Votes	%	±%
Liberal	Stephen O'Doherty	14,755	47.85	−14.57
Independent	Mick Gallagher	9,725	31.54	+23.54
Independent	Ted Roach	5,442	17.65	+8.57
Call to Australia	Robert Taylor	914	2.96	+0.73
Total formal votes		30,836	95.74	+2.00
Informal votes		1,371	4.26	−2.00
Turnout		32,207	82.68	−11.39
Two-candidate-preferred result
Liberal	Stephen O'Doherty	16,167	55.09	−17.62
Independent	Mick Gallagher	13,182	44.91	+44.91
Liberal hold				

== See also ==
- Electoral results for the district of Ku-ring-gai
- List of New South Wales state by-elections
