= Fireproof Australia =

Australian activist group

- Formation: 2022
- Founder: Violet Coco (and others)
- Type: Campaign organization
- Legal status: Organisation
- Purpose: Climate change activism
- Headquarters: Sydney
- Official language: English
- Website: fireproof.news

Fireproof Australia is a climate change activism group dedicated to safeguarding Australia's unique ecosystems, communities, and future generations from wildfires.

Members of the group were arrested after blocking the Sydney Harbour Bridge in 2022. One member was briefly jailed on remand, before successful appealing the conviction.

== Organisation history ==
Fireproof Australia is an Australia climate change activism group that was founded in 2022 in Sydney, Australia. Founding members included Violet Coco. The group has stated that it was formed in response to the lack of response by the Australian government to the 2019–20 Australian bushfire season that left 18,000 Australians internally displaced. The group rose to prominence in 2022 for a series of protests, including blocking high streets, interrupting a National Rugby League game, and obstructing traffic on the Sydney Harbour bridge – for which Violet Coco was sentenced to 15 months in prison.

In March 2023, a judge overturned the convictions and jail sentences of two Fireproof Australia activists. This decision came after it was discovered that the New South Wales Police Force had presented misleading evidence claiming that the protest had obstructed an emergency ambulance.

== Membership ==
Members include former members of Extinction Rebellion, Violet Coco, Rural Fire Service member Alan Russell Glover, and Karen Fitz-Gibbon.
