= Normanhurst =

- Suburb
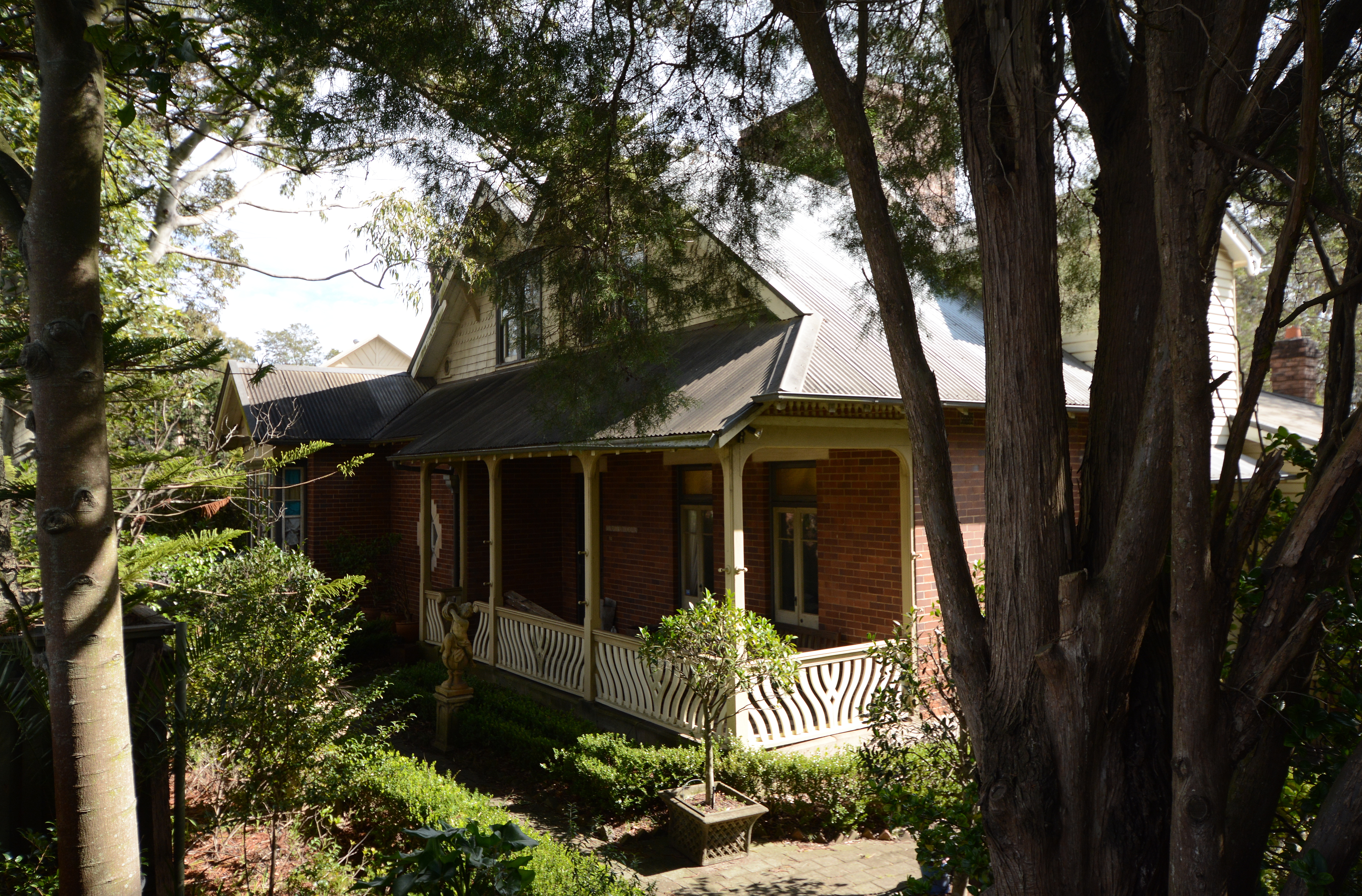
- Gilligaloola, family home of Norman Selfe, after which the suburb was named.

- Interactive map of Normanhurst
- Country: Australia
- State: New South Wales
- City: Sydney
- LGA: Hornsby Shire
- Location: 23 km (14 mi) NW of Sydney CBD

Government
  - State electorate: Wahroonga
  - Federal division: Berowra

Area
  - Total: 2.17 km^{2} (0.84 sq mi)
- Elevation: 169 m (554 ft)

Population
  - Total: 5,387 (2021 census)
  - Density: 2,482/km^{2} (6,430/sq mi)
- Postcode: 2076
Suburbs around Normanhurst
Hornsby	Hornsby	Waitara
Thornleigh	Normanhurst	Wahroonga
Thornleigh	Thornleigh	Wahroonga

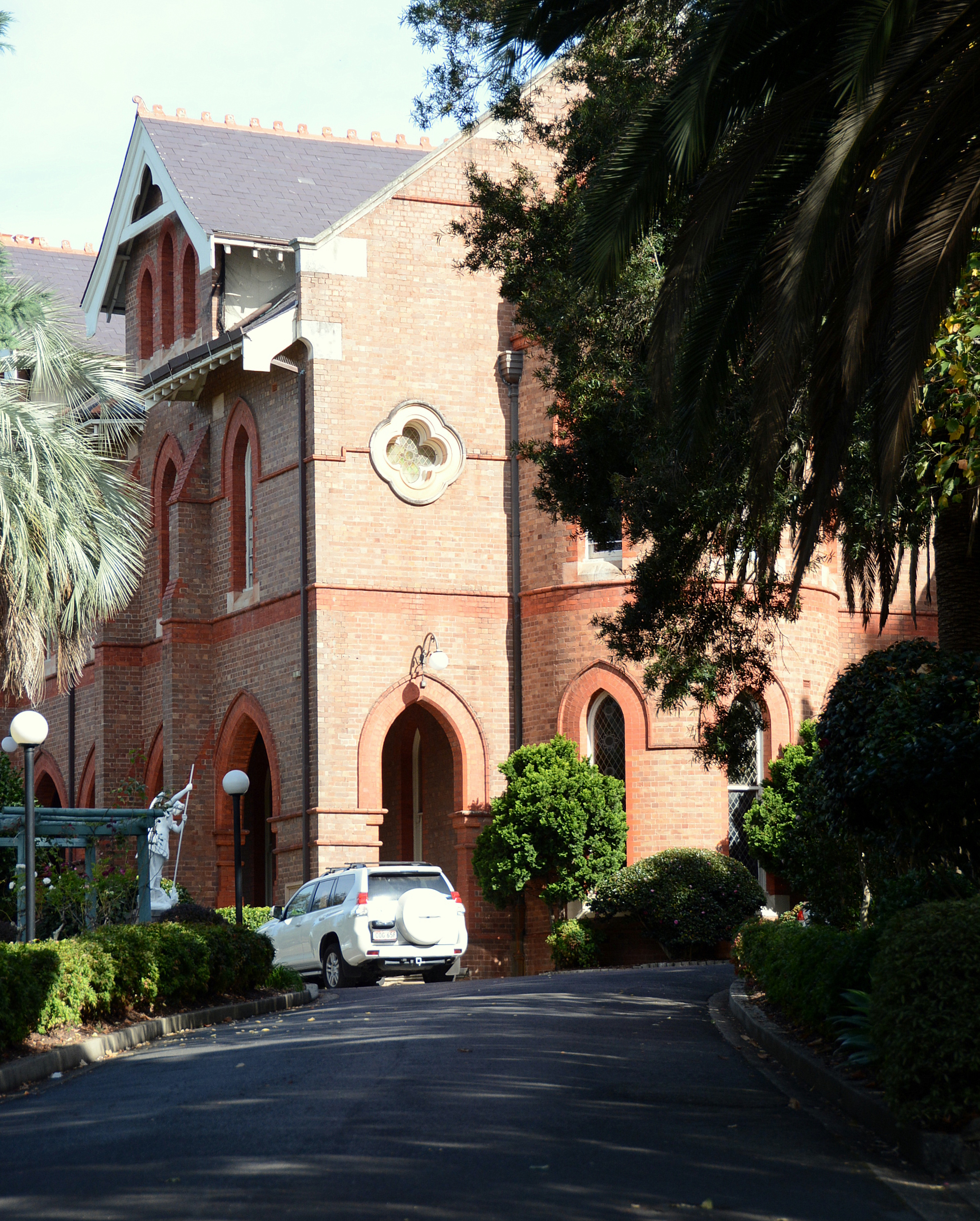
Loreto College Normanhurst

Normanhurst is a suburb in the Upper North Shore region of Sydney in the state of New South Wales, Australia, 22 kilometres north-west of the Sydney central business district in the local government area of Hornsby Shire.

== History ==
Normanhurst was originally known as Hornsby, with the suburb that is now known as Hornsby called Jack's Island. The land on which Normanhurst stands was granted to Constable Horne, who along with Constable John Thorn, captured bushrangers Dalton and John MacNamara, leader of the North Rocks gang on 22 June 1830. Constable Horne's land became what is now known as Normanhurst and Constable Thorn's land became the neighbouring suburb of Thornleigh.

The construction of the Main Northern and North Shore railway lines in the 1890s brought about a name change. The two lines were joined at a station called Hornsby Junction, whereas the station one stop south on the Northern line kept the name Hornsby. Due to confusion around the similarly named stops, the postmaster demanded that Hornsby station change its name.

The railway station originally known as 'Hornsby', opened on 21 November 1895 and the name was changed by the local community to Normanhurst in 1900.

The first Hornsby Post Office opened on 1 August 1864 and was renamed South Hornsby in 1900 and Normanhurst in 1905.

Normanhurst was derived from the name of a prominent resident, civil engineer Norman Selfe (1839–1911), with hurst being the English word for a wooded hill. Selfe protested against the name change, preferring the name St Normans, which he suggested would have been "more elegant and suggestive". The railway station was renamed in 1900 and was used for the suburb that developed around it.

== Heritage listing ==
Normanhurst has one heritage-listed site, Gilligaloola at 82-84 Pennant Hills Road.

== Geography ==
Normanhurst is divided by Pennant Hills Road, a major north-south road that leads north to the M1 Motorway, and south towards Parramatta. However, both the east and west sections have extensive bush access. On the east side, a small section of bush lies between Normanhurst and Fox Valley. This is land occupied by the SAN Hospital. On the western side, the suburb backs onto the southern reaches of the Berowra Valley, a continuous section of bush stretching all the way to Broken Bay. This gives Normanhurst a very "leafy" and rural look. In turn the rural quality is said to contribute to the abundance of bird life. The area is home to cockatoos, rainbow lorikeets, kookaburras, noisy miners, native brush turkeys, and powerful owls. Additionally, Normanhurst has several small waterfalls, which promote reptile and marsupial life, such as Eastern grey kangaroos, echidnas and red-bellied black snakes. It also has encouraged the growth of retirement residences in the suburb. The Hornsby Shire Historical Society and Museum is located on Kenley Road.

== Commercial area ==
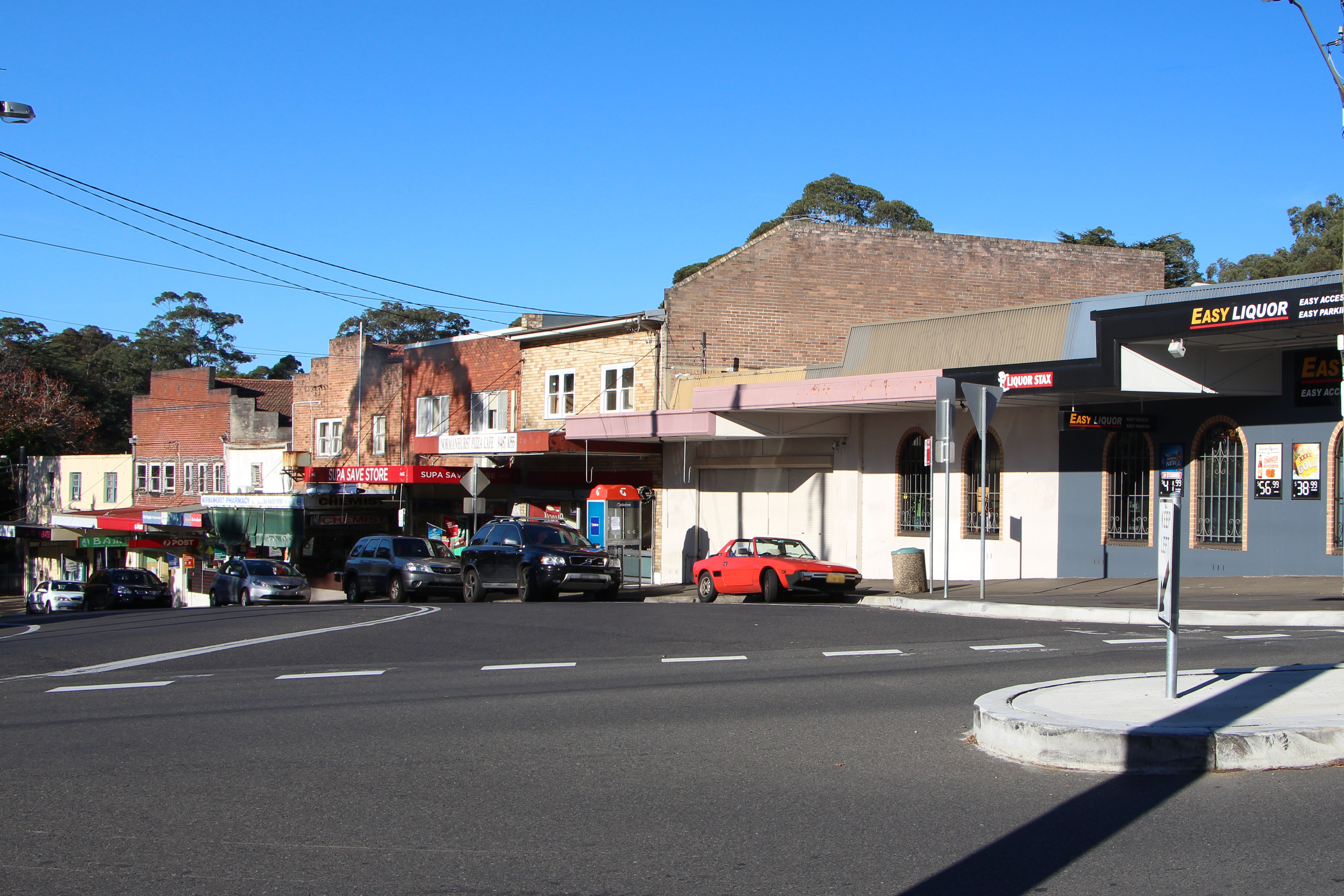
Strip of shops at Normanhurst railway station

Normanhurst has a small number of shops close to Normanhurst railway station, which includes cafes, restaurants, a liquor store and an Australia Post office.

== Transport ==
Normanhurst is serviced by rail and buses. Normanhurst railway station is on the Northern Line of the Sydney Trains network. CDC NSW's Upper North Shore service provide bus services to the area.

At the 2021 census, only 4.4% of employed people travelled to work on public transport and 30.0% by car (either as driver or as passenger). Pennant Hills Road is a major road in Sydney.

== Demographics ==
At the 2021 census, the suburb of Normanhurst recorded a population of 5,387.

Age and sex distribution
Children aged 15 and under made up 20.2% of the population, slightly higher than the national average of 18.2%. Residents aged 65 and over made up 18.7% of the total population (the national average was 17.2%). 49.7% of residents were male and 50.3% were female.

Ethnic and cultural diversity
Almost two-thirds of the population (63.0%) were born in Australia. The next most common countries of birth were China 7.1%, India 4.4%, and England 4.3%. Only 29.5% of the population identified their ancestry as Australian, 31.2% English, 14.0% Chinese, 9.3% Irish, and 8.8% Scottish. The most commonly spoken language at home other than English includes Mandarin 8.3%, Cantonese 2.6%, and Korean 2.0%, 68.2% of the population of Normanhurst used English only at home.

Religion
The most common responses for religion in Normanhurst in the 2021 Census were no religion 36.9%, Catholic 22.6%, Anglican 12.2%, Uniting Church 4.6%, and Hinduism 4.1%.

== Schools ==
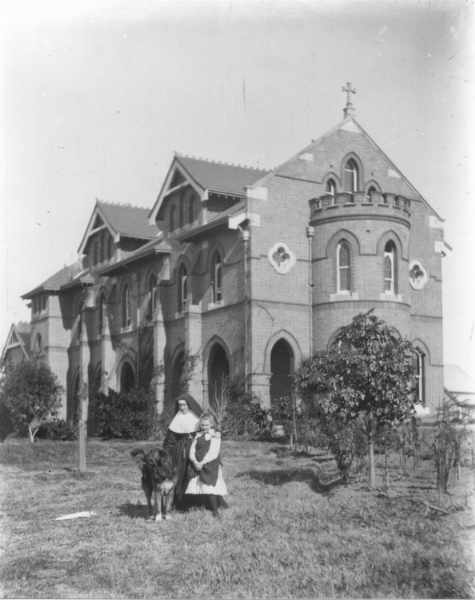
Loreto, 1897

Secondary Schools

- Loreto Normanhurst (Private, girls only)
- Normanhurst Boys High School (Public, selective, boys only)

Primary Schools

- Normanhurst Public School (Public)
- Normanhurst West Public School (which is actually in Thornleigh).

== Churches ==
- St. Stephen's Anglican Church
- Queen of Peace Catholic Church
- Normanhurst Uniting Church
- The Church of Jesus Christ of Latter-day Saints

== Sport and recreation ==
- Normanhurst Sports Club
- Normanhurst is home to the Normanhurst Eagles Football Club, their home ground is Normanhurst Oval. The club caters for both male and female football players in junior and senior divisions. The club's flagship team currently play in the Gladesville Hornsby Football Association's top-tier Premier League competition.
- Normanhurst-Warrawee Cricket Club also plays in Normanhurst, and is one of the most successful clubs in the Hornsby Ku-Ring-Gai Hills District Cricket Association, and has made several junior statewide twenty20 finals. The club's home ground is Normanhurst Park, as is its clubroom.
- Normanhurst Scout Group is one of the largest Scout Groups in NSW, providing fun youth development activities, building resilience and confidence in ages 5 to 18 in the Joey Scout, Cub Scout, Scout, and Venturer Scout sections.
- 2nd Normanhurst Rover Scout Unit is associated with Normanhurst Scout Group. Open to young people ages 18-25, Rover Scouts undertake a wide range of outdoor adventure, community service, and social activities.
