= Alister Henskens =

Australian politician (born 1963)

Alister Henskens MP SC
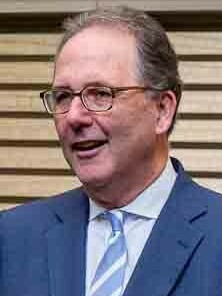

Minister for Skills and Training
- In office 21 December 2021 – 28 March 2023
- Preceded by: Geoff Lee (Skills and Training)
- Succeeded by: Tim Crakanthorp

Minister for Science, Innovation and Technology
- In office 21 December 2021 – 28 March 2023
- Preceded by: Brad Hazzard (Medical Research); Kevin Anderson (Better Regulation and Innovation)
- Succeeded by: Anoulack Chanthivong

Minister for Enterprise, Investment and Trade
- In office 5 August 2022 – 28 March 2023
- Preceded by: Stuart Ayres
- Succeeded by: Anoulack Chanthivong

Minister for Sport
- In office 5 August 2022 – 28 March 2023
- Preceded by: Stuart Ayres (Sport and Tourism)
- Succeeded by: Steve Kamper

Minister for Families, Communities and Disability Services
- In office 27 May 2021 – 21 December 2021
- Preceded by: Gareth Ward
- Succeeded by: Natasha Maclaren-Jones
Constituencies
Member of the New South Wales Legislative Assembly for Wahroonga
Incumbent
Assumed office 25 March 2023
Preceded by	new district
Member of the New South Wales Legislative Assembly for Ku-ring-gai
In office 28 March 2015 – 25 March 2023
Preceded by	Barry O'Farrell
Succeeded by	district abolished

Personal details
- Born: 30 December 1963 (age 62) Newcastle, New South Wales, Australia
- Party: Liberal Party

Alister Andrew Henskens SC (born 30 December 1963) is an Australian politician. Henskens has been a Liberal Party member of the New South Wales Legislative Assembly since 2015 representing the electorate of Ku-ring-gai on Sydney's upper North Shore which has been known as Wahroonga since 2023.

He served as the New South Wales Minister for Skills and Training, the Minister for Science, Innovation and Technology, and the Leader of the House in the Legislative Assembly in the second Perrottet ministry from December 2021 and March 2023. He previously served as the Minister for Families, Communities and Disability Services between May and December 2021.

== Background and career ==
He was born and raised in Newcastle. His father immigrated to Australia from the Netherlands in 1951 while his mother was schooled in Ku-ring-gai. Henskens studied economics and law at the University of Sydney while residing at St Andrew's College, before receiving a master's degree in law from the University of Toronto on a Rotary Scholarship. He practised as a solicitor from 1987 to 1996 and as a barrister thereafter, becoming Senior Counsel in 2011. He specialised in general commercial, insolvency, banking, defamation, building and construction law. He was a director of Basketball NSW from 1997 to 1998, and had a long involvement with local basketball organisations in Newcastle and Sydney.

He was Counsel Assisting the Equine Influenza Inquiry in 2008. Henskens also represented former NSW State Member for Terrigal, Chris Hartcher at the NSW Independent Commission Against Corruption (ICAC)'s Operation Spicer inquiry in 2014.

He was elected to the Legislative Assembly at the 2015 state election, succeeding former Premier Barry O'Farrell in the safe Liberal seat of Ku-ring-gai. He had won a closely fought Liberal preselection, with other contenders including radio presenter Jason Morrison. He was re-elected as the Member for Ku-ring-gai at the 2019 state election.

Henskens was until early 2017 the Chair of the Legislative Assembly Committee on Transport and Infrastructure, a member of the Legislation Review Committee and a member of the Committee on Investment, Industry and Regional Development. He was in 2015 the Chair of the Select Committee on the Regulation of Brothels and a member of the Joint Select Committee on Companion Animal Breeding Practices. Henskens served as the Cabinet Secretary between 24 April 2019 and 27 May 2021, having previously served as the Parliamentary Secretary for Finance, Services and Property since 1 February 2017. Henskens was appointed to Cabinet in May 2021 as Minister for Families, Communities and Disability Services, and further promoted again on 21 December 2021 as Minister for Skills and Training, the Minister for Science, Innovation and Technology, and as Leader of the House in the Legislative Assembly, in the Perrottet ministry.

On 11 September, 2026, Henskens announced his retirement from politics at the 2027 state election.

== Personal life ==
Henskens and his wife have two children. Henskens' niece is climate activist Violet Coco and Henskens had earlier voted in support of the anti‑protest legislation that was used to sentence Coco to 15 months imprisonment in December 2022.

New South Wales Legislative Assembly
Preceded by Barry O'Farrell	Member for Ku-ring-gai; 2015–2023	Seat abolished
New seat	Member for Wahroonga; 2023 – present	Incumbent
Political offices
Preceded by Gareth Ward	Minister for Families, Communities and Disability Services; 2021	Succeeded by Natasha Maclaren-Jones as Minister for Families and Communities and Minister for Disability Services
Preceded by Geoff Lee as Minister for Skills and Tertiary Education	Minister for Skills and Training; 2021–2023	Succeeded by Tim Crakanthorp as Minister for Skills, TAFE and Tertiary Education
Preceded by Brad Hazzard as Minister for Health and Medical Research	Minister for Science, Innovation and Technology; 2021–2023	Succeeded by Anoulack Chanthivong as Minister for Innovation, Science and Technology and Minister for Industry and Trade
Preceded by Kevin Anderson as Minister for Better Regulation and Innovation	Minister for Science, Innovation and Technology; 2021–2023	Succeeded by Anoulack Chanthivong as Minister for Innovation, Science and Technology and Minister for Industry and Trade
Preceded by Stuart Ayres	Minister for Enterprise, Investment and Trade; 2022–2023	Succeeded by Anoulack Chanthivong as Minister for Innovation, Science and Technology and Minister for Industry and Trade
Preceded by Stuart Ayres as Minister for Tourism and Sport	Minister for Sport; 2022–2023	Succeeded by Steve Kamper
