= Thornleigh =

- Suburb
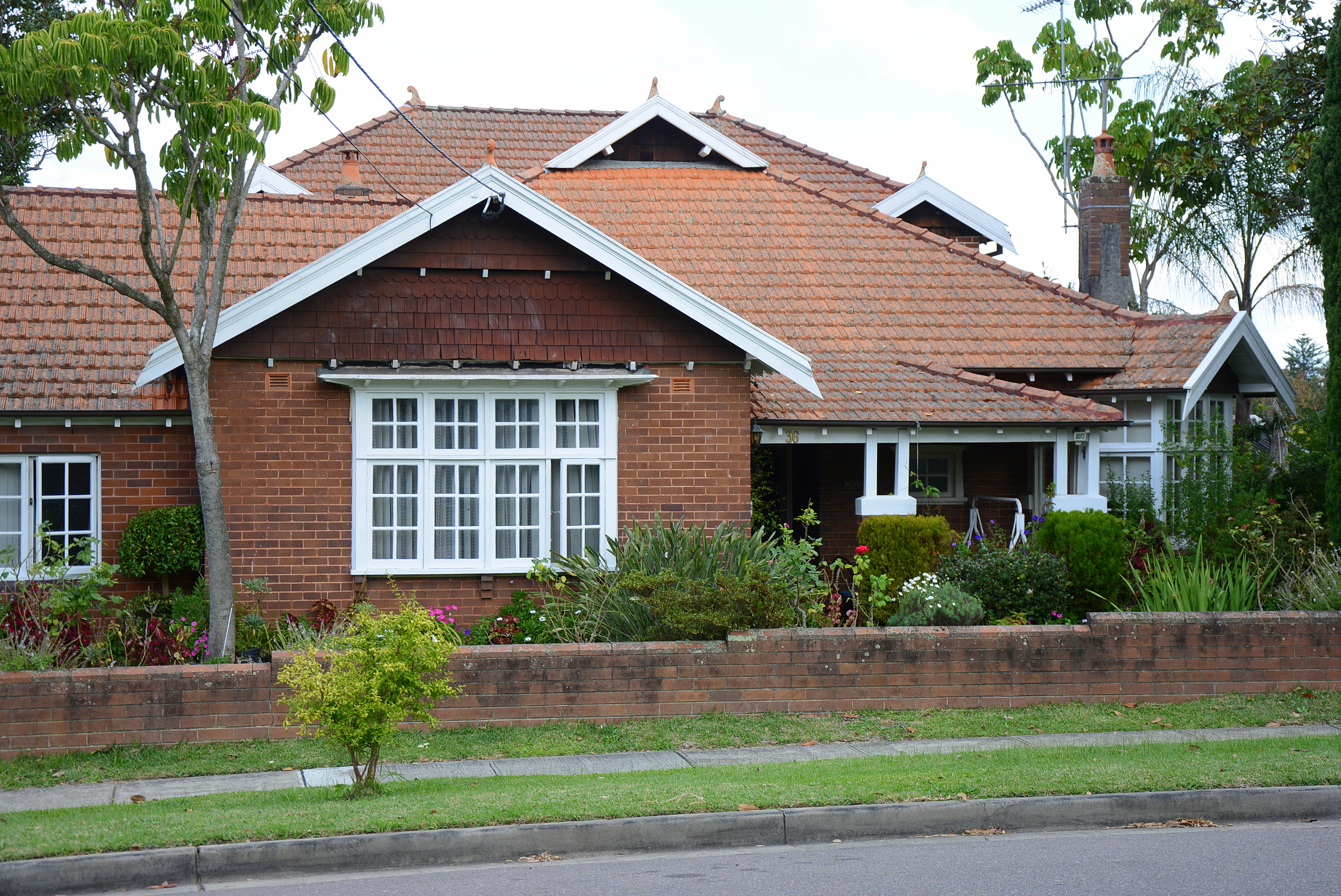
- Federation style home, Station Street

- Interactive map of Thornleigh
- Country: Australia
- State: New South Wales
- City: Sydney
- LGA: Hornsby Shire
- Location: 22 km (14 mi) north-west of Sydney CBD
- Established: 1830s

Government
  - State electorate: Wahroonga
  - Federal division: Berowra

Area
  - Total: 4 km^{2} (1.5 sq mi)
- Elevation: 170 m (560 ft)

Population
  - Total: 8,898 (2021 census)
  - Density: 2,220/km^{2} (5,800/sq mi)
- Postcode: 2120
Suburbs around Thornleigh
Westleigh	Hornsby	Hornsby
Westleigh	Thornleigh	Normanhurst; Wahroonga
Pennant Hills	Pennant Hills	Turramurra

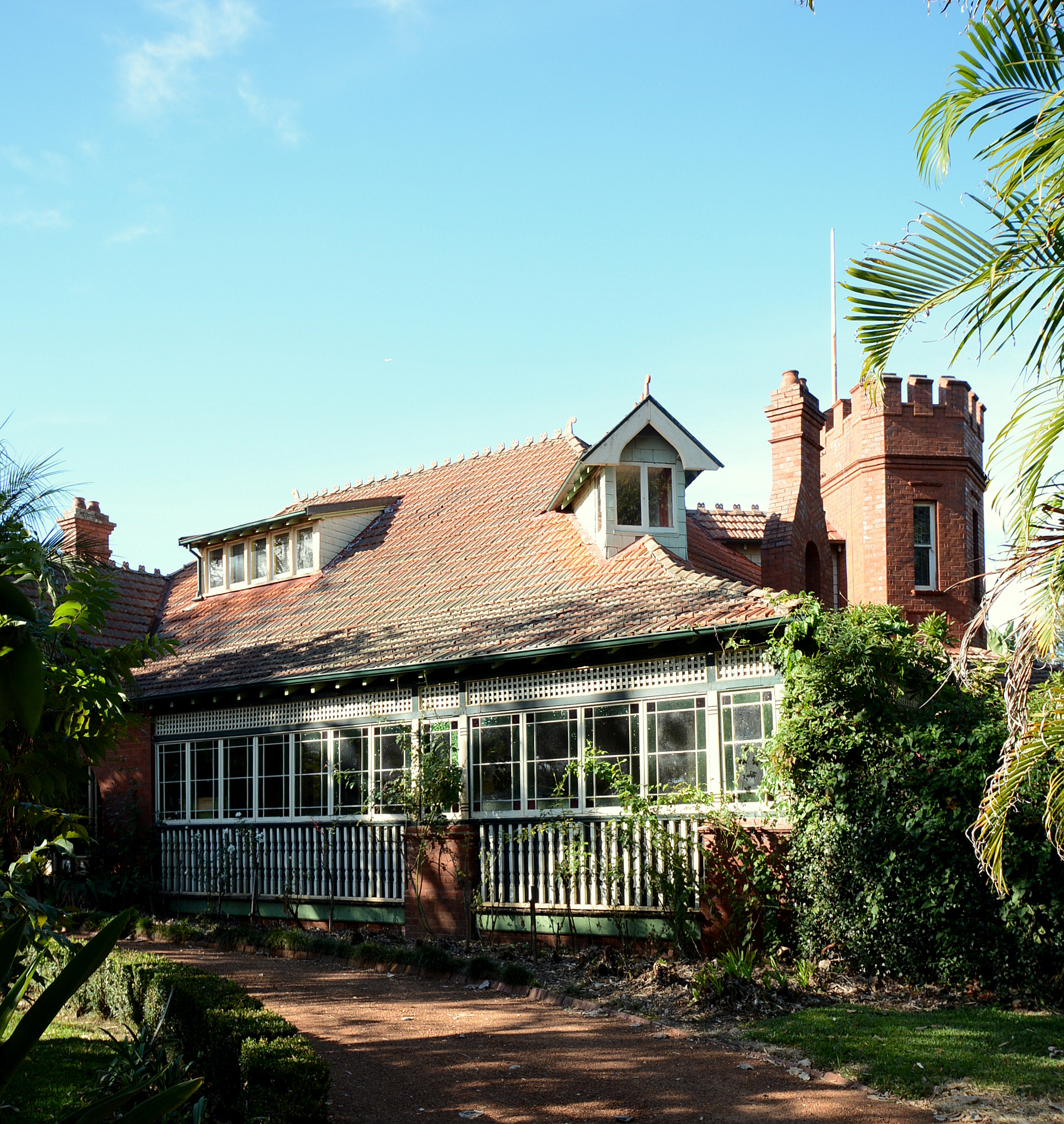
Federation house with tower and battlements

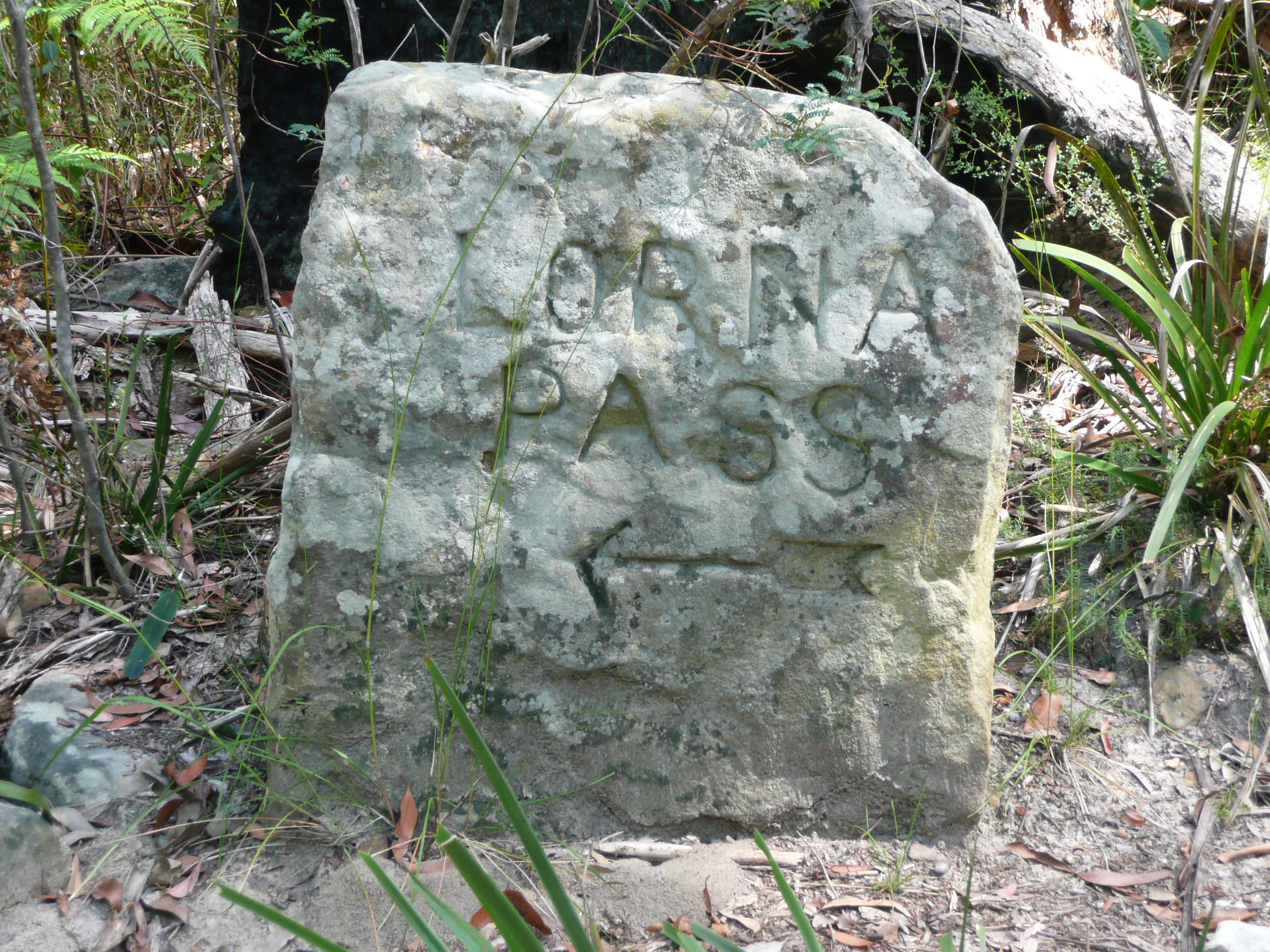
Old stone sign on Lorna Pass, near the Lane Cove River

Thornleigh is a suburb in the Upper North Shore region of Sydney in the state of New South Wales, Australia. Thornleigh is located 22 kilometres north-west of the Sydney central business district in the local government area of Hornsby Shire. The source of the Lane Cove River is located in Thornleigh.

== Geography ==
Thornleigh is bounded to the north by Waitara Creek and south by the Lane Cove National Park. Thornleigh borders the suburbs of Normanhurst, Hornsby, Wahroonga, Westleigh and Pennant Hills. Thornleigh offers great district views, and the topography varies greatly with many established areas built around bushland settings and into the hills to afford the great views. The northern areas of the suburb bounded by Larool Creek and Waitara Creek are leafy and lush with vegetation and native fauna including rainbow lorikeets, kookaburras, cockatoos, and bush turkeys. Majorie Headen Lookout is a vantage point which overlooks Larool and Waitara Creek Valley. The area bounded near Thornleigh railway station and the Comenarra Parkway include early examples of Federation and Californian Bungalow style properties.

== History ==
Thornleigh was originally part of the land that the Kuringai people settled. The first non-indigenous people to explore the area of Thornleigh were a party led by Governor Arthur Phillip in 1788. Settlers moved into the area in the 1830s and among them were James Milson, Patrick Duffy, John Thorn and Samuel Horne. Thornleigh is named after Constable John Thorn, who, along with Constable Horne, captured bushrangers Dalton and John MacNamara, leader of the North Rocks gang, on 22 June 1830, and were granted land as a reward in 1838. Horne's land became Hornsby (now Normanhurst), and Thorn's land became Thornleigh.

Orcharding was one of the major mainstays of Thornleigh during the late nineteenth century. Land sales posters used this as an attraction for prospective settlers describing the area as "beautifully situated (and) surrounded by magnificent orchards, the fruit from which affords a splendid proof of the fertility of the soil and mildness of the climate". Among the orchard growers was Patrick Michael Duffy, after which Duffy Avenue was named. After Patrick Duffy's passing, his land was subdivided and passed down to his son Patrick Duffy Jnr. Eventually part of this land was purchased by the wealthy Friend family who built the Windyhaugh property on Duffy Avenue, which was later used as the first Presbyterian Fellowship Union camp in the Commonwealth.

As part of the construction of the Main Northern railway line from Strathfield to Hornsby, a 1.2 km branch was constructed in 1884 by the contractors to a quarry in a gully west of Thornleigh. The tracks included a zig zag section.

Thornleigh railway station opened on 17 September 1886 where the local produce (mainly citrus fruits) was exported to the city markets. Fruit grown at Thornleigh was also being exported as far as Vancouver and San Francisco.

Thornleigh Post Office opened on 12 March 1888.

The Thornleigh School of Arts opened in 1890 and was demolished in 1980 along with many other locations of historical significance in the suburb throughout the commercial development of the area in the 1970s and 1980s. These include the Astra Theatre (Originally named the Prince of Wales Theatre in 1923), the Royal Hotel, Thornleigh Public School with its World War I memorial and the original Edwardian structures at Thornleigh railway station. The Thornleigh Community Centre was constructed by the local and state government in order to compensate the community for the demolition of the Thornleigh School of Arts.

In 1901, the National Brickworks started operations at Thornleigh. In 1913, the largest malt works in the southern hemisphere was established by WG Chilvers. Chilvers Road was named after William George Chilvers. Other streets with notable names include Norman Avenue, named after the Australian engineer Norman Selfe.

During the Great Depression of the 1930s, unemployment was a problem in the area, so a local woman named Lorna Brandt raised money for the construction of a walking track near the Lane Cove River as a way of providing relief work. The track begins at Thornleigh Oval, at the bottom of Handley Avenue, and goes through the bush towards the Lane Cove River. It then goes parallel to the river for a short distance before looping back to arrive at Comenarra Parkway. An extension goes down to the river, through a spot called Conscript Pass. At this spot, there are rock carvings done by the men who worked on the track. One of the carvings is a caricature of Bertram Stevens, Premier of New South Wales from 1932 to 1939. The track is known as Lorna Pass in memory of Lorna Brandt, and is now part of the Great North Walk, a long-distance walking trail between Sydney and Newcastle.

Plans to establish a university at Thornleigh in response to the large number of enrolments at the University of Sydney and the University of New South Wales were discussed in the early 1960s due to Thornleigh being "Central to the Northern Line and the North Shore", however, the university was eventually established in Macquarie Park and is now known as Macquarie University.

== Transport ==
Thornleigh railway station is on the Main Northern railway line. Pennant Hills Road is part of the National Highway, and is one of Sydney's major thoroughfares. The Esplanade from Pennant Hills is a main road accessing Thornleigh to Normanhurst. The Comenarra Parkway is an arterial road that stretches from Thornleigh through to West Pymble via Wahroonga, Turramurra and South Turramurra.

Bus services from the CDC NSW Upper North Shore service include:

- 587: Hornsby station to Westleigh via Waitara and Normanhurst
- 588: Hornsby station to Normanhurst West via Normanhurst service
- 589: Hornsby station to Sydney Adventist Hospital via Waitara, Normanhurst, Woodlands Estate and Thornleigh.
- 590: Hornsby station to Pennant Hills station

== Commercial areas ==
Thornleigh contains industrial and commercial areas.

Thornleigh Marketplace containing a Woolworths supermarket and speciality stores was constructed in 2005 and includes: A post office, butchers, hair and nail salons, pharmacy, gym, sushi bar, cafe, optometrist and .

Shops and restaurants are located around Thornleigh railway station. Hardware chain Bunnings have a store located next to Pennant Hills Road. Fast food restaurant chain McDonald's has its Australian headquarters and flagship store in Thornleigh.

== Churches ==
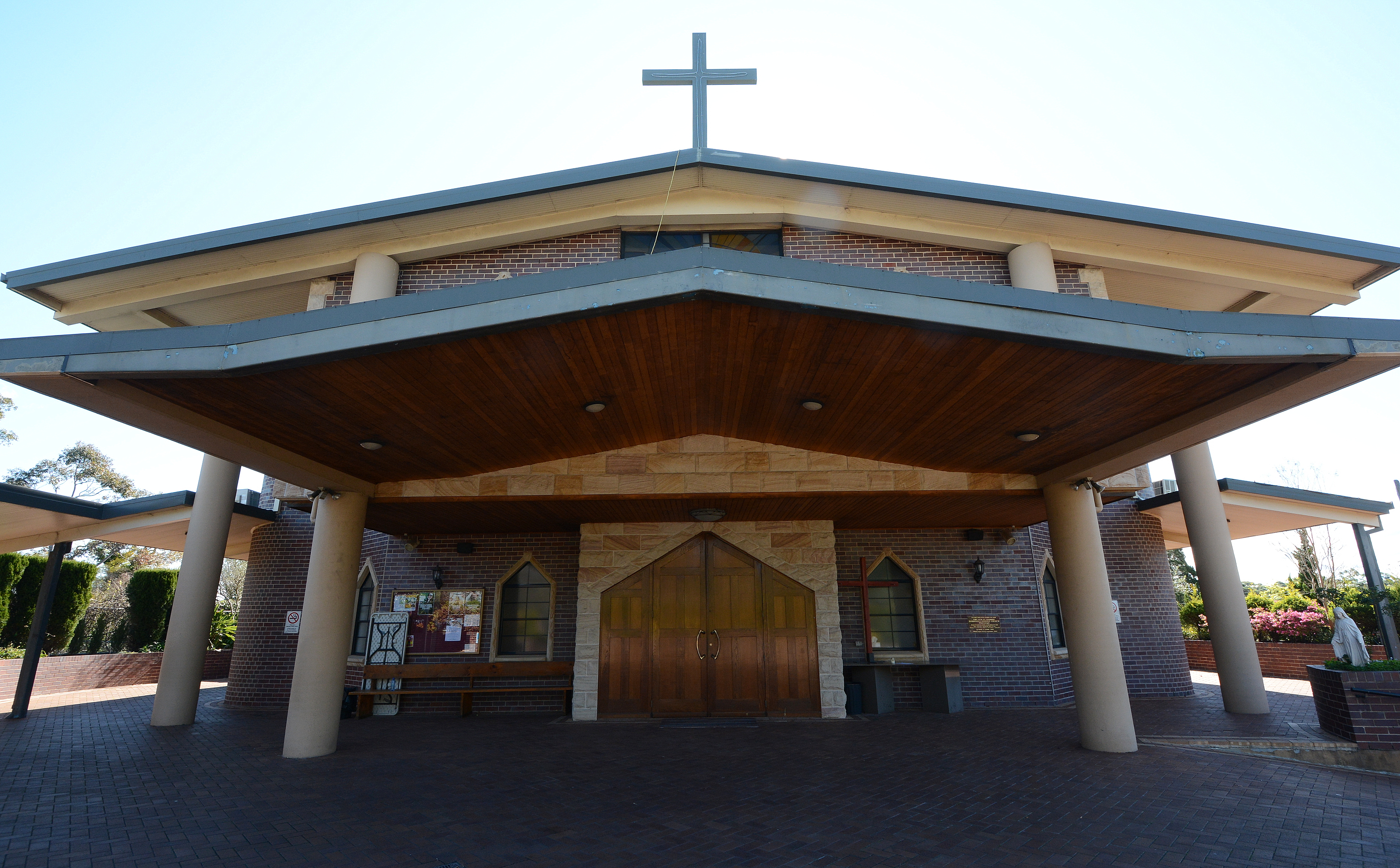
St George Maronite Catholic Church

- St George Maronite Catholic Church
- St Therapon Greek Orthodox Church
- Thornleigh Community Baptist Church
- Thornleigh Hillcrest Uniting Church
- Chinese Australian Baptist Church Thornleigh
- Northridge Vineyard Church
- Thornleigh Seventh Day Adventist Church

== Schools ==
- Thornleigh West Public School is a primary school (K-6, Public).
- Normanhurst West Public School (K-6, Public) at the corner of Sefton and Dartford Road.

Thornleigh Public and Infants Schools were opened in 1891 and closed in late 1989.

== Demographics ==
At the 2021 census, the population of Thornleigh was 8,898 people. Of these:

Age distribution
The distribution of ages in Thornleigh was similar to the country as a whole. Thornleigh residents' median age was 40 years, compared to the national median of 38. Children aged under 15 years made up 20.9% of the population, national average was 18.2% and people aged 65 years and over made up 14.8% of the population, national average was 17.2%.
Cultural diversity
61.8% of Thornleigh residents were born in Australia, compared to the national average of 66.9%; the next most common countries of birth were China 6.4%, India 3.7%, England 3.5%, South Korea 2.1% and Philippines 1.9%. 66.0% of people only spoke English at home, other languages spoken at home included Mandarin 7.2%, Cantonese 3.5%, Korean 2.9%, Arabic 2.7%, and Hindi 1.6%. 28.0% of the population identified their ancestry as Australian, 29.5% English, 14.7% Chinese, 8.7% Irish and 8.0% Scottish.
Religion
The most common responses for religion were: No Religion 38.0%, Catholic 21.3%, Anglican 12.2%, and Hinduism 4.3%.

== Sports and Recreation ==
The local sports clubs include the Thornleigh Sport and Recreation Club with baseball, basketball, cricket, netball, soccer and softball divisions. The soccer club known as Thunder FC consists of teams ranging from Under 6s through to All Age divisions playing in the Gladesville Hornsby Football Association.

Sports grounds include Thornleigh Oval, Headon Park and Oakleigh Oval. The Brickpit Park has an indoor basketball stadium where it is home to the Hornsby-Ku-Ring-Gai Basketball Association. It is also a popular sports venue for schools in the Hornsby-Kuring-gai area. Other venues at the Brickpit Park include The Thornleigh Golf Centre, which includes driving ranges and mini-golf courses. Skateboarding and other passive recreational activities are also available at the Brickpit. Thornleigh Squash Centre has 9 glass backed courts.
