= Old Windsor Road =

Road in Sydney, New South Wales, Australia

Old Windsor Road Cumberland Highway New South Wales
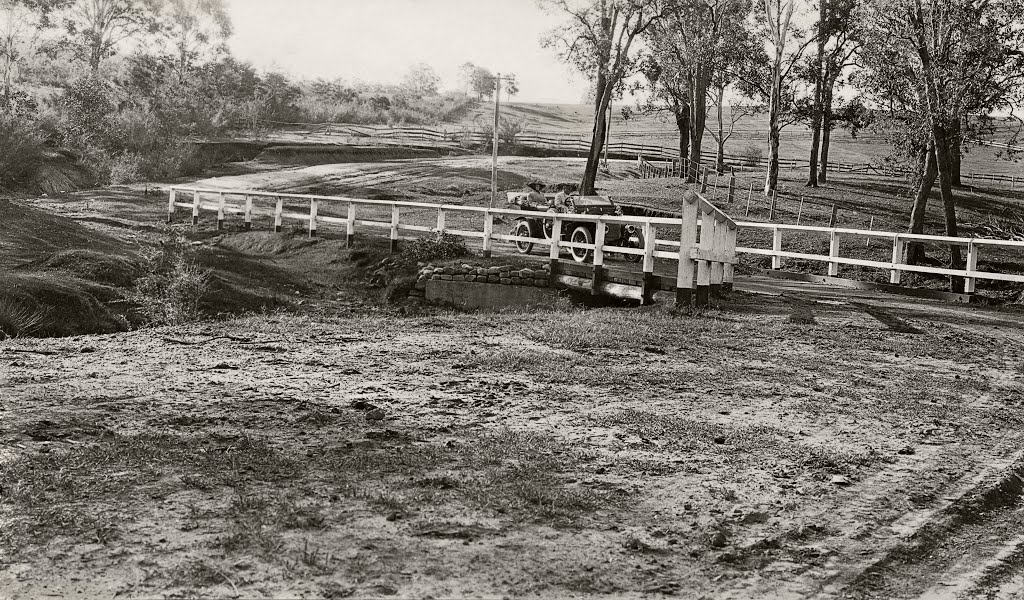
- Old Windsor Road circa 1913
- Coordinates: 33°42′15″S 150°55′49″E (Northwest end); 33°47′48″S 150°59′12″E (Southeast end)

General information
- Type: Road
- Length: 11.8 km (7.3 mi)
- Opened: 1794
- Gazetted: August 1928 (as Main Road 180); August 1988 (as State Highway 13, Cumberland Highway)
- Route number(s): A2 (2013–present) (Kellyville–Seven Hills); A40 (2013–present) (Seven Hills–Northmead); Concurrency: A28 (2013–present) (Constitution Hill–Northmead)
- Former route number: State Route 40 (2007–2013) Entire route; Metroad 2 (1997–2013) (Kellyville–Seven Hills); Metroad 7 (1993–2005); State Route 77 (1988–1993) (Constitution Hill–Northmead)

Major junctions
- Northwest end: Windsor Road; Kellyville, Sydney
- Sunnyholt Road; Norwest Boulevard; Westlink M7; Seven Hills Road; M2 Hills Motorway; Hart Drive
- Southeast end: Briens Road; Northmead, Sydney

Old Windsor Road is a notable and historic road in Sydney, New South Wales, Australia. It starts from Kellyville, New South Wales and ends at Northmead, New South Wales, just north of Parramatta, and acts as part of a main arterial between Parramatta and Windsor. A section at its southeastern end is a constituent part of Cumberland Highway.

== Route ==
Old Windsor Road commences at the intersection with Windsor Road in Kellyville, and runs in a southeasterly direction as a dual-carriageway, 4-lane road, widening to 6 lanes at the intersection with Seven Hills Road, narrowing back to 4 lanes at the intersection with Abbott Road and the southbound ramps to M2 Hills Motorway, then widening again to 6 lanes at Fitzwilliam Road. It meets Cumberland Highway at the intersection of Hart Drive in Constitution Hill and continues in a southeasterly direction as part of Cumberland Highway, before meeting and merging into Briens Road at an intersection in Northmead; Cumberland Highway continues east along Briens Road.

The North-West T-way runs alongside the entire length of Old Windsor Road. Windsor is connected to Parramatta via the 31-kilometre-long (19 mi) Windsor Road cycleway, with much of its route via the North-West T-way, adjacent to the Old Windsor Road.

Old Windsor Road, Bella Vista in 2020

== History ==
Old Windsor Road was part of the original Windsor Road, which opened in 1794. This was the second main road built for the colony of Sydney to connect Parramatta and Windsor—a distance of 23 miles and 16 chains (37.33 km). The northern section of Windsor Road and Old Windsor Road used to be continuous until 1812, when a new alignment of Windsor Road from Kellyville to Northmead was completed. As a result, the southern section of the original Windsor Road was renamed Old Windsor Road, meeting the new alignment of Windsor Road at a T-junction.

The passing of the Main Roads Act of 1924 through the Parliament of New South Wales provided for the declaration of Main Roads, roads partially funded by the State government through the Main Roads Board. Main Road No. 180 was declared along this road on 8 August 1928, from the intersection with Great Western Highway just west of Parramatta, to the intersection with (New) Windsor Road at Kellyville. However this was quickly revoked, when it the northern end was truncated to end at the boundary of the old City of Holroyd local government area on 8 May 1929, and then abolished completely in 1930.

The construction of Stage 4 of the Parramatta Bypass (completed in December 1981) realigned the Westmead section of Old Windsor Road to feed it directly into Briens Road; the previous alignment was downgraded into a number of residential streets (today Ferndale Close, Hart Drive, Fulton Avenue, Darcy Road, and Hawkesbury Road to end at Great Western Highway). The southeastern end of the road, from the intersection with Hart Drive in Constitution Hill to its terminus at the intersection with Briens Road at Northmead, was declared as part of Cumberland Highway on 26 August 1988; State Highway 13 (previously declared to run through Parramatta via Pennant Hills Road and Church Street) was altered to use this new route, with Main Road 635 declared along the section from Hart Drive to Seven Hills Road in Seven Hills; Main Road 635 was extended further north along the remaining length of the road to meet Windsor Road in Kellyville on 15 February 1991.

With the opening of M2 Hills Motorway in 1997, Metroad 2 was realigned to run along Old Windsor Road from the motorway terminus at Seven Hills to Kellyville (and continuing along Windsor Road to Windsor); the junction at Kellyville was reconstructed so that the northern section of Windsor Road became continuous with Old Windsor Road again at a T-junction. In 2007, the intersection with Norwest Boulevard at Bella Vista was upgraded into an interchange to allow an underpass for Old Windsor Road.

The passing of the Roads Act of 1993 through the Parliament of New South Wales updated road classifications and the way they could be declared within New South Wales. Under this act, Old Windsor Road today retains its declaration as Highway 13 from the intersection with Hart Drive in Constitution Hill to the intersection with Briens Road at Northmead, and as Main Road 635 Hart Drive to the intersection with Windsor Road at Kellyville.

As part of Cumberland Highway, the section between Constitution Hill and its southeastern end at Northmead was allocated State Route 77 in 1988, replaced by Metroad 7 in 1993; Metroad 7 was removed when Westlink M7 opened in 2005. With the opening of M2 Hills Motorway in 1997, Metroad 2 was realigned to use the northern section of Old Windsor Road, between the motorway's exit ramps in Seven Hills and its northwestern end in Kellyville. State Route 40 was realigned in 2007 from Windsor Road to Old Windsor Road along its entire length. With the conversion to the newer alphanumeric system in 2013, Metroad 2 was replaced with route A2 from Kellyville to Seven Hills, State Route 40 was replaced with route A40 from Seven Hills to Northmead, and the section gazetted as Cumberland Highway was also re-allocated as part of route A28.

Almost all of its original concrete markers have disappeared with the extensive road widening. One section has been restored to its original state as it passes Rouse Hill House and Rouse Hill Public School, with the traffic diverted onto a new section of road.

== Major intersections ==
LGA	Location	km	mi	Destinations	Notes
Blacktown–The Hills boundary	Kellyville Ridge–Stanhope Gardens–Beaumont Hills–Kellyville quadripoint	0.0	0.0	Windsor Road (A2 north, unallocated east) – Windsor, Baulkham Hills	Northwestern terminus of road, route A2 continues north along Windsor Road
Blacktown–The Hills boundary	Glenwood–Bella Vista boundary	4.4	2.7	Norwest Boulevard – Glenwood, Norwest to Westlink M7 (M7) – Rooty Hill, Prestons	Single-point urban interchange
Blacktown–The Hills boundary	Glenwood–Bella Vista–Kings Langley tripoint	5.8	3.6	Westlink M7 (M7) – Beecroft, North Ryde	Half-diamond interchange, eastbound entrance and westbound exit only
Blacktown–The Hills boundary	Bella Vista–Kings Langley–Seven Hills–Baulkham Hills quadripoint	6.4	4.0	Seven Hills Road – Seven Hills, Baulkham Hills	
Blacktown–The Hills boundary	Seven Hills–Baulkham Hills boundary	7.3	4.5	Abbot Road (west) – Seven Hills	Northern terminus of route A40
Blacktown–The Hills boundary	Seven Hills–Baulkham Hills boundary	7.3	4.5	M2 Hills Motorway (M2 east) – Beecroft, North Ryde	
Parramatta	Old Toongabbie–Constitution Hill boundary	10.1	6.3	Fitzwilliam Road – Toongabbie	
Parramatta	Constitution Hill–Northmead boundary	11.3	7.0	Hart Drive (Cumberland Highway) – Wentworthville, Smithfield, Liverpool	Western terminus of concurrency with route A28
Toongabbie Creek		11.4	7.1	Bridge (no known official name)	
Parramatta	Northmead	11.8	7.3	Briens Road (Cumberland Highway) (A28/A40) – Wahroonga, Ryde, Clyde	Southeastern terminus of road Routes A28 and A40 continue east along Briens Road
1.000 mi = 1.609 km; 1.000 km = 0.621 mi: Concurrency terminus; Tolled; Route transition
