= North Kellyville =

- Suburb
- Interactive map of North Kellyville
- Coordinates: 33°41′07″S 150°57′09″E
- Country: Australia
- State: New South Wales
- City: Sydney
- LGA: The Hills Shire
- Established: 2018

Government
  - State electorate: Kellyville
  - Federal division: Mitchell
- Elevation: 79 m (259 ft)

Population
  - Total: 17,401 (SAL 2021)
- Postcode: 2155
Suburbs around North Kellyville
Rouse Hill	Annangrove	Annangrove
Beaumont Hills	North Kellyville	Kenthurst
Beaumont Hills	Kellyville	Glenhaven

North Kellyville is a suburb of Sydney, in the state of New South Wales, Australia. It is located 37 kilometres north-west of the Sydney central business district within the local government area of The Hills Shire. The suburb falls within the Hills District.

== History ==
North Kellyville was officially proclaimed as a suburb on 29 June 2018. Previously, it had been a part of the older suburb of Kellyville.

== Education ==
Schools located in North Kellyville include:

- North Kellyville Public School
- Hills Adventist College
- Our Lady of the Angels Primary School
- Australian International Academy

North Kellyville has the following public school catchment:

- Ironbark Ridge Public School
- Beaumont Hills Public School
- Rouse Hill High School

== Commercial areas ==
The primary retail area is situated at the junction of Withers and Hezlett Roads, where North Kellyville Square is located. It features a Woolworths supermarket, BWS liquor store, and various other specialty stores and services. An Aldi supermarket and other specialty stores can be found at the North Village, at the corner of Hezlett and Beaton Roads. McDonalds is also situated next to North Village. Rouse Hill Town Centre is easily accessible through regular bus services. Kellyville Village - having Coles, Woolworths and Aldi and several other stores - is also located nearby, at the corner of Green Road and Wrights Road.

== Reserves and parks ==
North Kellyville has several reserves and parks. Some of the most visited ones are Samantha Riley Reserve, Twickenham Avenue Reserve, Oxlade Reserve, Withers Road Reserve, Springbrook Boulevard Reserve, Bladensburg Road Reserve, etc.

== Transport ==
- The 615X Hillsbus service to the Sydney CBD via Kellyville, Baulkham Hills, and the M2 runs during peak hours.
- The 605 Hillsbus service operates between Stringer Road in North Kellyville and Rouse Hill Town Centre.
- The 601 Hillsbus service operates between Rouse Hill Station and Parramatta via Hills Showground.
- The 715 Hillsbus service operates between Rouse Hill Station and Seven Hills via Kellyville & Norwest.

== Places of worship ==
The churches in the suburb are:

- Kellyville Seventh-day Adventist Church
- Our Lady of the Angels Catholic Church
- The Church in Sydney
- Open House Church of Christ
