= Norwest, New South Wales =

Suburb in Sydney, Australia

Norwest
- Suburb
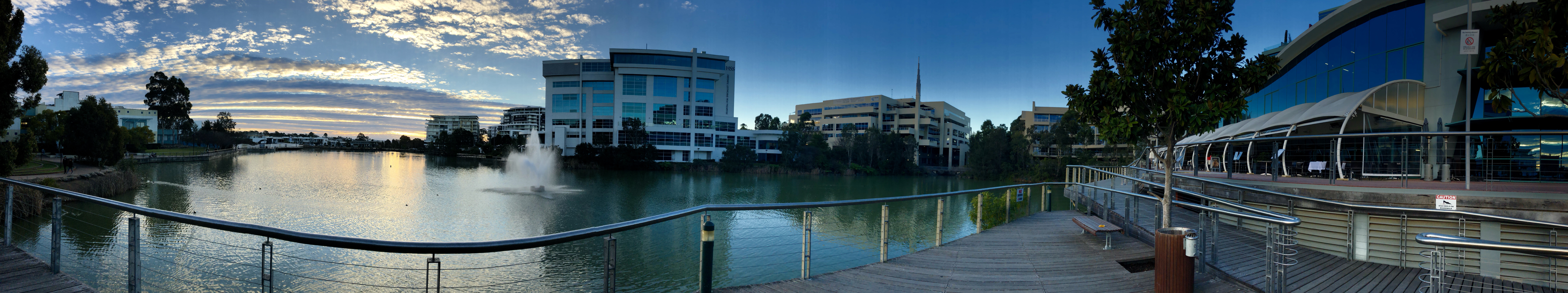
- Panorama of Norwest Lake in July 2018

- Interactive map of Norwest
- Coordinates: 33°43′59″S 150°57′49″E
- Country: Australia
- State: New South Wales
- City: Sydney
- LGA: The Hills Shire
- Established: 2018

Government
  - State electorate: Kellyville
  - Federal division: Mitchell
- Elevation: 92 m (302 ft)

Population
  - Total: 4,688 (SAL 2021)
- Postcode: 2153
Suburbs around Norwest
Bella Vista	Kellyville	Castle Hill
Bella Vista	Norwest	Castle Hill
Bella Vista	Baulkham Hills	Castle Hill

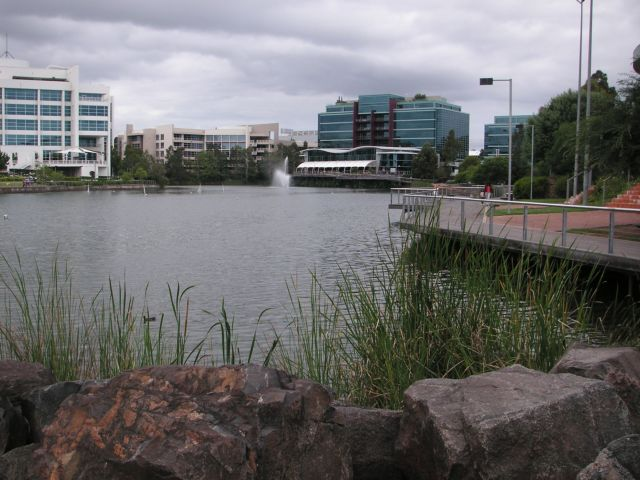
Norwest Business Park

Norwest is a suburb of the Hills District within Greater Western Sydney, in the state of New South Wales, Australia, located 35 kilometres north-west of the Sydney central business district. The Norwest Business Park is located within Norwest and the adjacent suburb of Bella Vista and Baulkham Hills. The council chambers for The Hills Shire Council are also located within this suburb.

== History ==
Norwest was officially proclaimed a suburb on 29 June 2018. Previously, it had been part of the older suburbs of Baulkham Hills and Kellyville.

The Geographical Names Board, in June 2018, amended the suburb boundaries of Kellyville, Baulkham Hills, Bella Vista and Rouse Hill resulting in the creation of two new suburbs named North Kellyville and Norwest.

From 2018 to 2019, in preparation for the Norwest metro station which opened in May 2019, Norwest underwent an urban transformation, building up apartments and commercial retail stores around Norwest Lake, while also transforming what was previously "Coles Norwest" into Norwest Marketown.

== Commercial areas ==
Norwest Marketown is a shopping centre featuring a Coles and dozens of specialty stores, small electronic and clothing stores, banks, restaurants and a day care centre.

== Residential areas ==
Norwest features two main residential areas along boundaries of the suburb. Within Norwest, there is a variety of housing including low density housing, townhouses and apartments. Most of the housing within Norwest is close to retail, employment, recreation and transport within the suburb and the neighbouring suburbs of Kellyville, Castle Hill and Baulkham Hills.

The area to the north of the suburb is part of the Balmoral Road release area and is within proximity of roads such as Fairway Drive, Stone Mason Drive and Spurway Drive. This area has a wide range from high rise apartments close to the lake to low density housing to the north of the golf course.

The area to the south of the suburb is located along Barina Downs Road and features mainly low density housing and townhouses, with one apartment complex

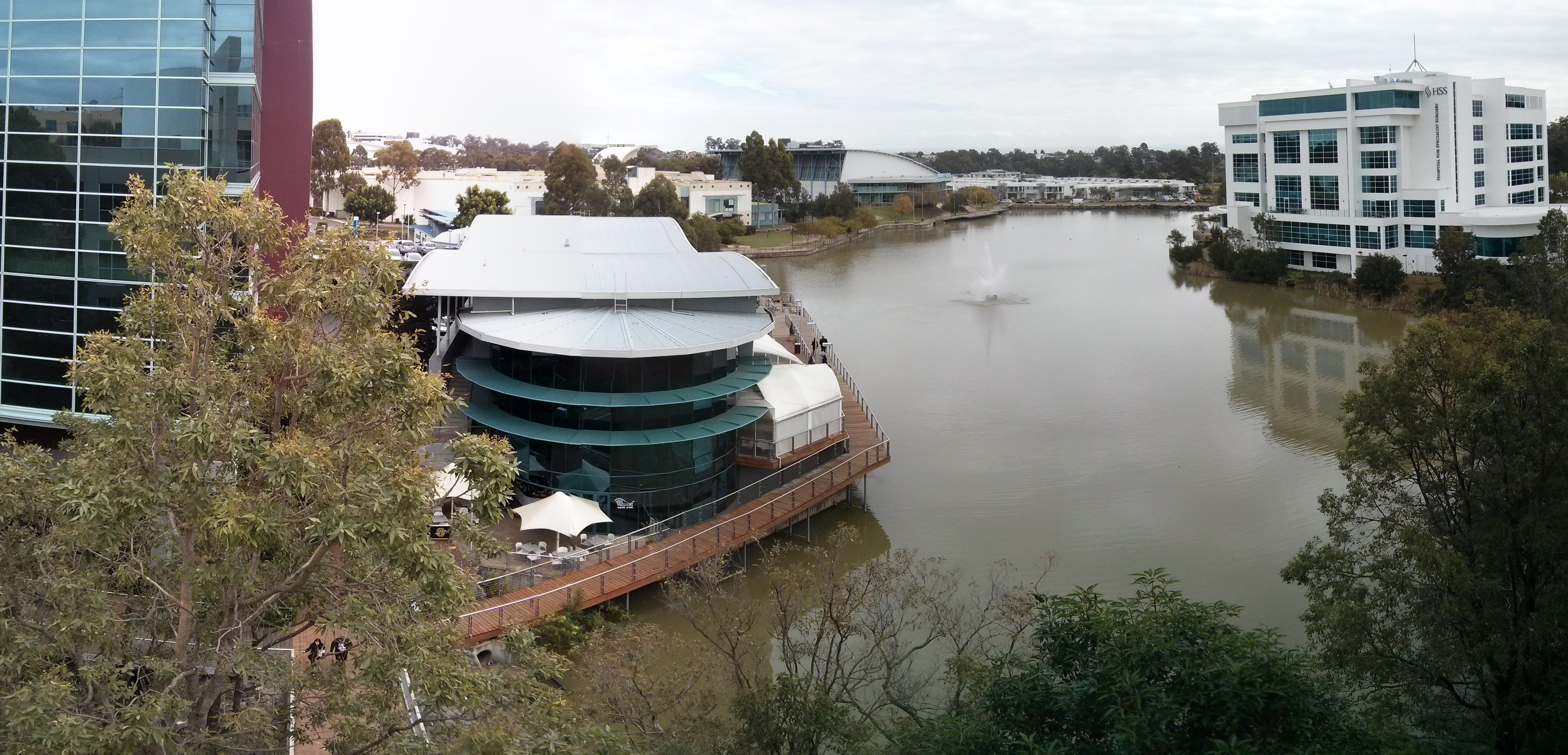
Norwest Lake

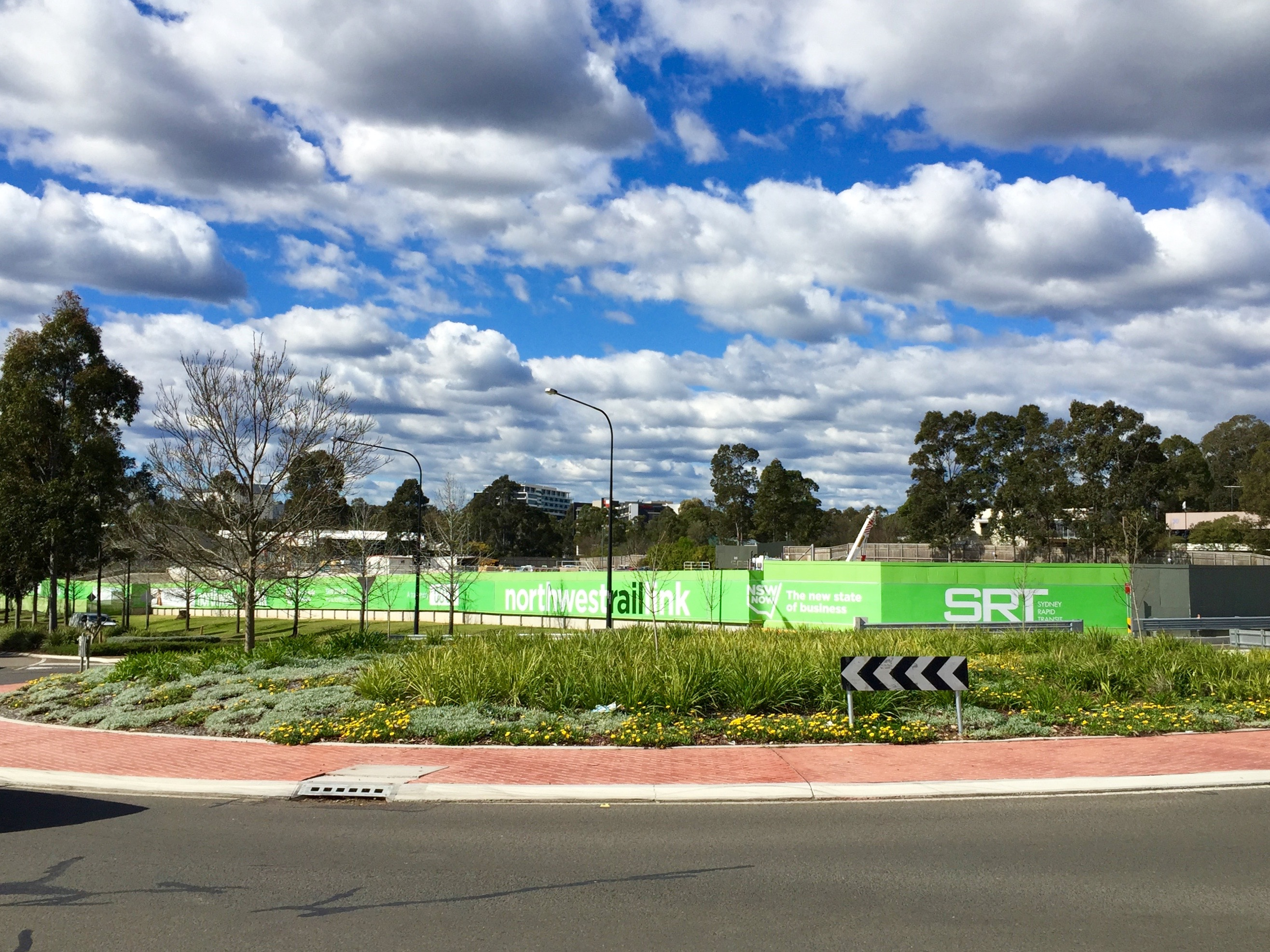
Sydney Metro Norwest Station

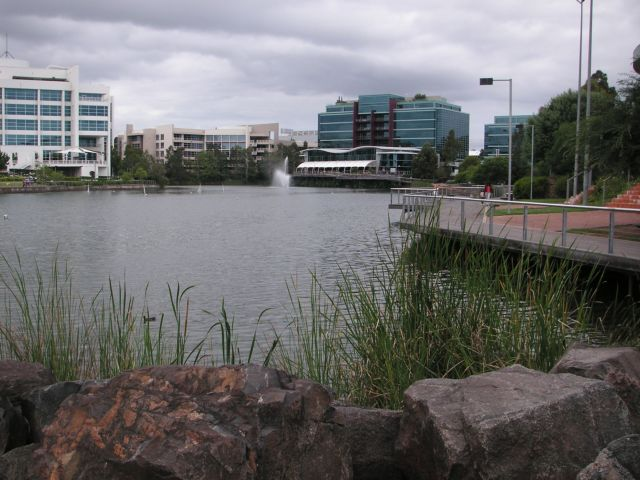
Norwest, Bella Vista

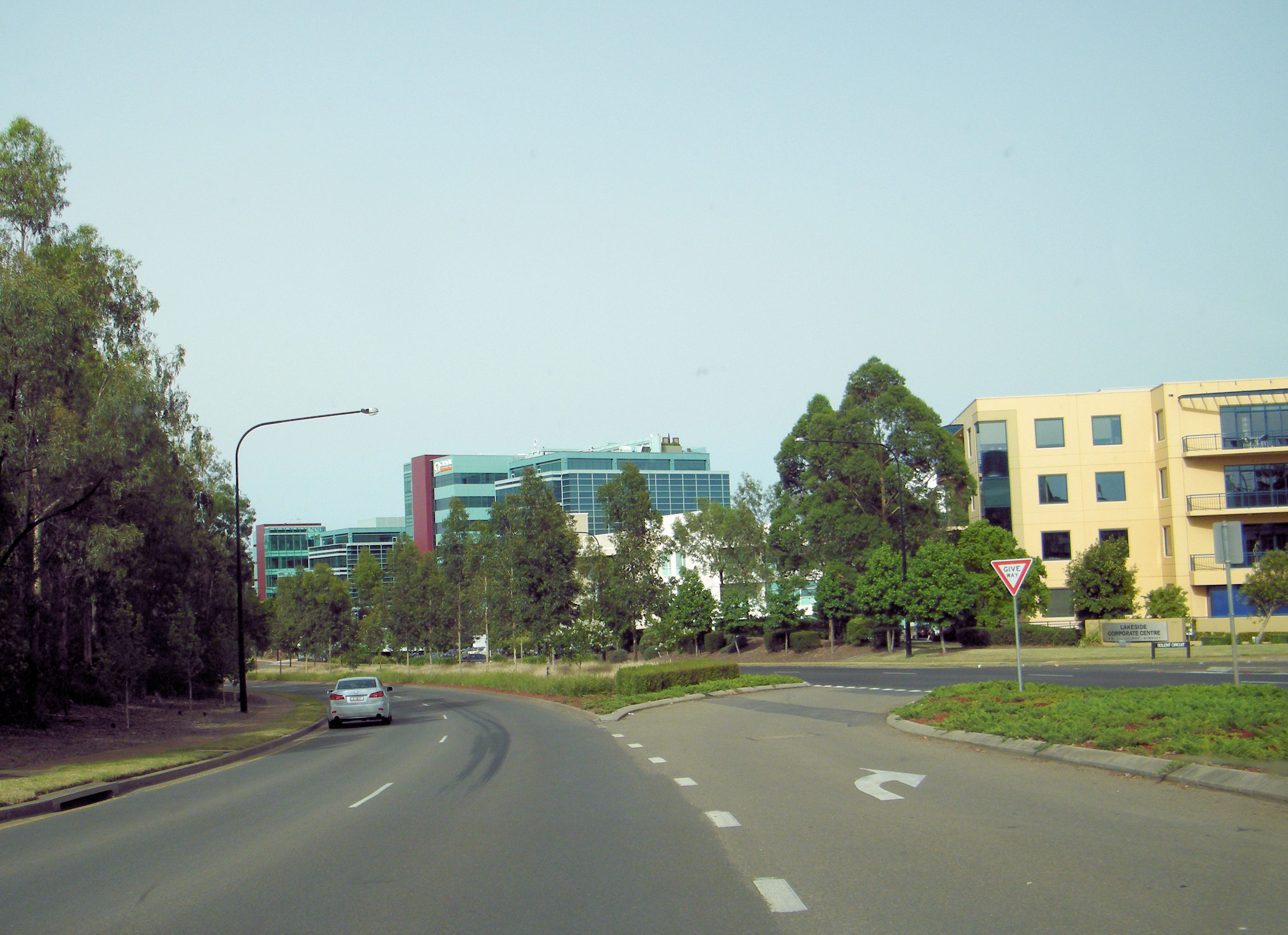
Norwest Boulevard

== Transport ==
=== Road ===
Windsor Road connects Norwest to Baulkham Hills, Parramatta and Sydney from the eastern end of the suburb. Within the suburb, Norwest Boulevard connects Norwest with Bella Vista, the Westlink M7 and Old Windsor Road, which connects Norwest with other locations such as Penrith, Liverpool and Campbelltown.

=== Metro ===
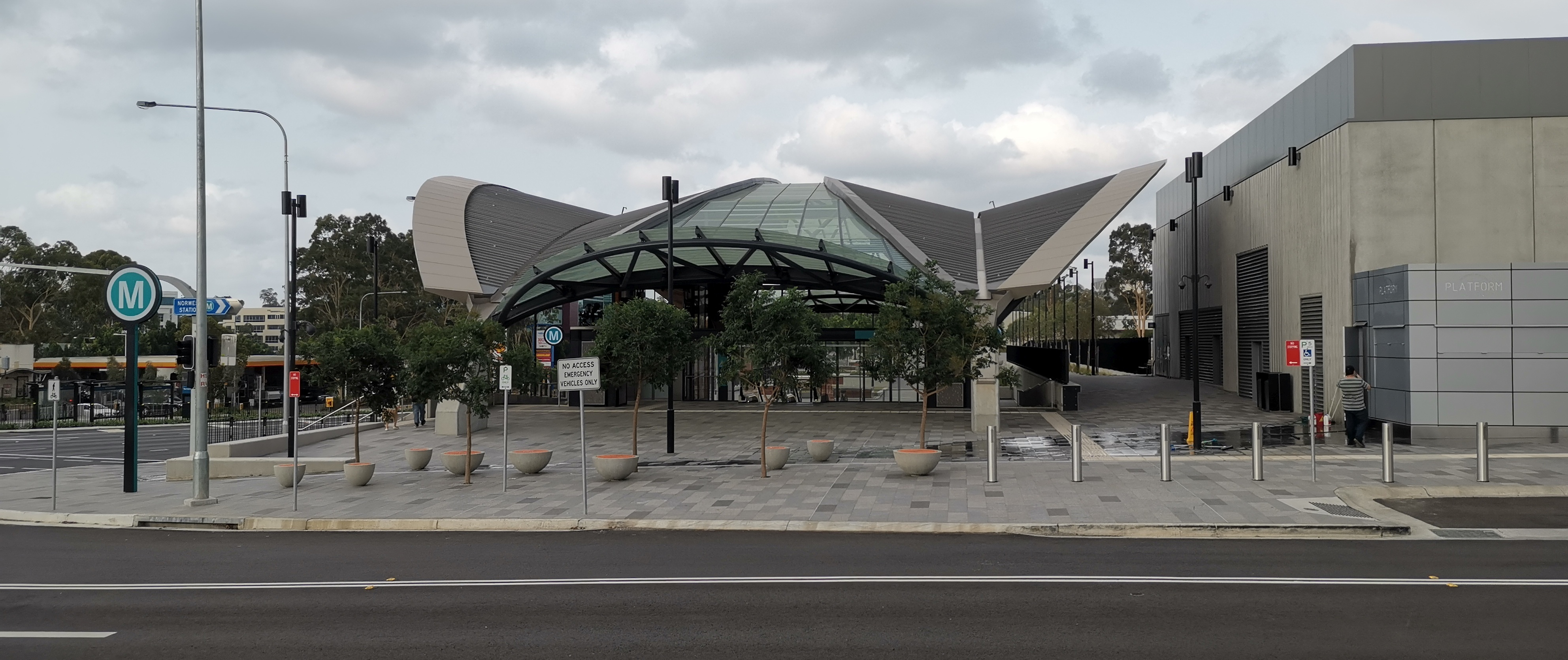
Norwest metro station, December 2019, Southern side (Brookhollow Avenue) entry and exit

Norwest is serviced by Norwest metro station which is located on the Northwest line of the Sydney Metro. Opened in 2019, the station links Norwest to locations between Tallawong and Sydenham stations. The line will be extended in 2026 through the City to Bankstown via the existing Bankstown railway line.

=== Buses ===
Norwest is serviced by multiple bus routes run by CDC NSW and Busways. These include:

- 613X Bella Vista to the City via M2 Motorway and the Lane Cove Tunnel
- 632 Rouse Hill to Pennant Hills via Norwest and Castle Hill
- 660 Castle Hill to Parramatta via Norwest, Winston Hills and the T-Way
- 662 Castle Hill to Parramatta via Norwest, Bella Vista and the T-Way
- 664 Rouse Hill to Parramatta via Kellyville, Norwest, Bella Vista and the T-Way
- 714 Bella Vista to Seven Hills via Crestwood
- 715 Rouse Hill to Seven Hills via Norwest and Bella Vista
- 730 Castle Hill to Blacktown via Norwest, Bella Vista, Glenwood and the T-Way
- N92 Town Hall to Tallawong via Epping, Norwest, Castle Hill and Rouse Hill (night service)

== Places of worship ==
The site of the first Hillsong church is located within Norwest, a megachurch which now has over 150,000 followers globally in over 30 countries, and 38 churches in Australia.
