= Windsor Road Monster =

Individual Australian magpie

The Windsor Road Monster (also known as the Circa Marauder, Windsor Road Bomber, or just Monster) was an Australian magpie that lived in Bella Vista, New South Wales, a northwestern suburb of Sydney.

== Attacks ==
While usually only a small number of male magpies become aggressive during the breeding season in attempts to protect newborns from perceived threats, the Monster was described as a "very aggressive and uncharacteristically territorial" magpie. The NSW National Parks and Wildlife Service (NPWS) called the Monster a "significant risk to public safety". The Monster was known for three years before its death, with over forty complaints made to the Hills Shire Council about the magpie's behaviour.

The Monster was particularly aggressive towards cyclists. Reports of attacks included the Monster deliberately attacking cyclists' faces under their helmets, and some of the Monster's victims required hospitalisation after attacks, including one man who suffered a heart attack during an attack, with the Monster continuing to attack him while he was on the ground losing consciousness.

== Attempts at relocation ==
While it is unusual for a council to intervene regarding magpie attacks, the Hills Shire Council made multiple attempts to rehome the Monster given the unusual aggressiveness of the Monster. As magpies are a legally protected species, as are all native animals in New South Wales, the NPWS gave the council a permit to trap and relocate the Monster.

== Death ==
A second permit was issued by the NPWS for the magpie to be shot after attempts at relocation failed. The council announced that the Monster had been "humanely euthanised" on 28 August 2019. New South Wales Police officers were present at the time of its death.

=== Response ===
The killing of the Monster was a controversial decision among the community.

Emma Hurst of the Animal Justice Party publicly condemned the killing. Some members of the community argued the killing was unnecessary as magpies are only aggressive during six weeks of the year, but a council spokesperson said the Monster was known for attacking people even outside the breeding season.
