= Windsor Road =

Road in Sydney, Australia

Windsor Road New South Wales
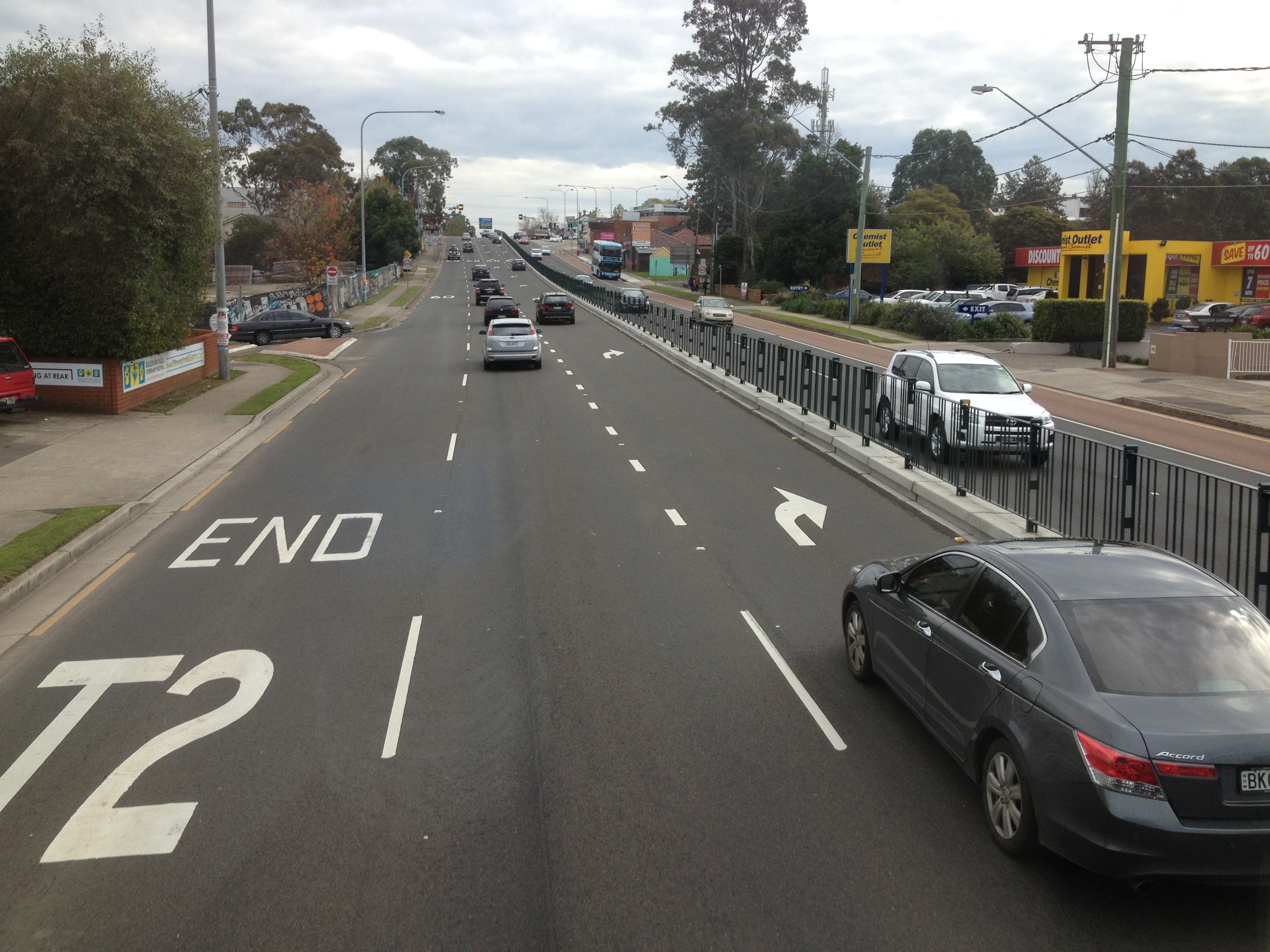
- Northbound along Windsor Road at Baulkham Hills
- Coordinates: 33.605356°S 150.824262°E (Northwest end); 33.793611°S 150.999997°E (Southeast end)

General information
- Type: Road
- Length: 29.6 km (18 mi)
- Opened: 1794 (Windsor–Kellyville); 1812 (Kellyville–Northmead)
- Gazetted: August 1928
- Route number(s): A2 (2013–present) (Windsor–Kellyville)
- Former route number: Metroad 2 (1993–2013) State Route 40 (1974–2013) (Windsor–Kellyville); Metroad 2 (1993–1997) State Route 40 (1974–2007) (Kellyville–Castle Hill); State Route 40 (1974–2007) (Castle Hill–Northmead)

Major junctions
- Northwest end: Bridge Street; Windsor, Sydney
- Macquarie Street: Groves Avenue; Old Windsor Road; M2 Hills Motorway; James Ruse Drive
- Southeast end: Church Street; North Parramatta, Sydney

Location(s)
- Major suburbs: McGraths Hill, Vineyard, Rouse Hill, Kellyville, Baulkham Hills

Windsor Road is a notable road in the Hills District of Sydney, linking Windsor and North Parramatta in Sydney's west. It is a constituent part of route A2.

== Route ==
Windsor Road commences at the intersection of Bridge and Macquarie Streets in Windsor and heads in a southeasterly direction as a two-lane, single carriageway road, widening to a four-lane, dual-carriageway road at McGraths Hill. It continues through Rouse Hill, before turning off at the intersection with Old Windsor Road at Kellyville and narrowing back to a single carriageway road at Baulkham Hills, crossing under M2 Hills Motorway a short distance later. It continues in a southerly direction to cross over James Ruse Drive in Northmead, before eventually terminating at the intersection of North Rocks Road and Church Street in North Parramatta.

The North West T-way runs next to and parallel to Windsor Road from Kellyville to Rouse Hill.

== History ==
The original Windsor Road opened in 1794, between Windsor and Northmead. A newer alignment of Windsor Road, branching off the original alignment at Kellyville and ending in North Parramatta, opened in 1812; the original alignment of Windsor Road between Kellyville and Northmead was renamed to Old Windsor Road and formed a T-junction where it met with Windsor Road. This remained until 2002 when the Old Windsor Road regained importance and the junction was reconstructed to allow through traffic along the original Windsor Road alignment.

The passing of the Main Roads Act of 1924 through the Parliament of New South Wales provided for the declaration of Main Roads, roads partially funded by the State government through the Main Roads Board (later Transport for NSW). Main Road No. 184 was declared along this road on 8 August 1928, from the intersection with Pennant Hills Road just north of Parramatta to Windsor (and continuing westwards via Richmond, Bilpin and Bell to the intersection with Great Western Highway at Mount Victoria); with the passing of the Main Roads (Amendment) Act of 1929 to provide for additional declarations of State Highways and Trunk Roads, this was amended to Main Road 184 on 8 April 1929.

The passing of the Roads Act of 1993 updated road classifications and the way they could be declared within New South Wales. Under this act, Windsor Road retains its declaration as part of Main Road 184.

Windsor Road was allocated State Route 40 in 1974. Metroad 2 was also allocated along it in 1993 between Windsor and Showgrounds Road in Castle Hill, until M2 Hills Motorway opened in 1997 and Metroad 2 was truncated to the intersection with Old Windsor Road in Kellyville. State Route 40 was also re-aligned in 2007 to follow Metroad 2 along Old Windsor Road, leaving the portion of the road south of the intersection in Kellyville unallocated. With the conversion to the newer alphanumeric system in 2013, State Route 40 was abolished, and Metroad 2 was replaced with route A2.

== Major intersections ==
LGA	Location	km	mi	Destinations	Notes
Hawkesbury	Windsor	0.0	0.0	Bridge Street – Wilberforce, Wisemans Ferry, Putty	Northeastern terminus of road and route A2
Hawkesbury	Windsor	0.0	0.0	Macquarie Street (A9) – South Windsor, Richmond, Narellan	
Hawkesbury	McGraths Hill	1.4	0.87	Pitt Town Road – Pitt Town, Cattai	
Hawkesbury	Mulgrave–Vineyard boundary	2.7	1.7	Groves Avenue (B59) – Richmond, Kurrajong, Bell, Lithgow	
Blacktown–The Hills boundary	Rouse Hill–Kellyville Ridge boundary	13.7	8.5	Schofields Road – Schofields, Marsden Park	
Blacktown–The Hills boundary	Kellyville Ridge–Stanhope Gardens–Kellyville tripoint	15.4	9.6	Old Windsor Road (A2) – Bella Vista, Seven Hills, Northmead	Route A2 continues south along Old Windsor Road
The Hills	Norwest–Castle Hill boundary	20.3	12.6	Showground Road – Castle Hill	
The Hills	Baulkham Hills	25.5	15.8	Old Northern Road (north) – Dural, Maroota, Wisemans Ferry; Seven Hills Road (west) – Seven Hills	
The Hills	Baulkham Hills	26.3	16.3	M2 Hills Motorway (M2) – Liverpool, Eastern Creek, Macquarie Park, Artarmon	
The Hills–Parramatta boundary	Northmead–North Rocks boundary	29.3	18.2	James Ruse Drive (Cumberland Highway) (A28/A40) – Liverpool, Clyde, Gladesville	
Parramatta	North Rocks–North Parramatta boundary	29.6	18.4	North Rocks Road – North Rocks, Carlingford	
Parramatta	North Rocks–North Parramatta boundary	29.6	18.4	Church Street – Parramatta	Southern terminus of road
Route transition

== See also ==
- Old Windsor Road
