= Hills Adventist College =

Location
- Castle Hill and Kellyville, Sydney, New South Wales; Australia; 33°44′08″S 151°00′21″E; 33°41′47″S 150°57′23″E

Information
- Type: Independent co-educational early learning, primary and secondary day school
- Motto: Nurture for today. Learning for tomorrow. Character for eternity.
- Religious affiliation: Australian Union Conference of Seventh-day Adventists
- Denomination: Seventh-day Adventist
- Established: 1961; 65 years ago
- Principal: Mrs Carlie Deppeler
- Employees: 61
- Grades: Early learning and K–12
- Enrolment: 795 (2023)
- Affiliation: Independent Schools Association
- Website: www.hills.adventist.edu.au

Hills Adventist College is a co-educational independent Seventh-day Adventist school with two campuses in the Sydney's Hills district: Castle Hill (ELC and Primary) and Kellyville (K-Y12). Hills Adventist College Castle Hill is an ELC and Primary co-educational Christian school in the Sydney Hills district. Hills Adventist College Kellyville is a welcoming K-Y12 co-educational Christian school in the Sydney Hills district. Enrolments at the College during 2023 totalled 795 students. The College is a part of the Seventh-day Adventist education system, the world's second largest Christian school system.

== Spiritual aspects ==
All students are required to take part in Bible classes from Kindergarten to Year 10, and then Studies of Religion (SOR) a 2-unit NSW HSC course is mandatory in Year 11 and 12 (Unless they take the 1-unit course Mathematics Extension 1, in which they take the 1-unit version instead). The Bible classes cover topics in biblical history and Bible characters and themes and other Christian doctrines. Weekly, the student body gathers for a chapel service. Outside the classrooms there is year-round spiritually oriented programming that relies on student involvement.

== See also ==
- List of Seventh-day Adventist secondary schools
- List of non-government schools in New South Wales
