= Beaumont Hills =

- Suburb
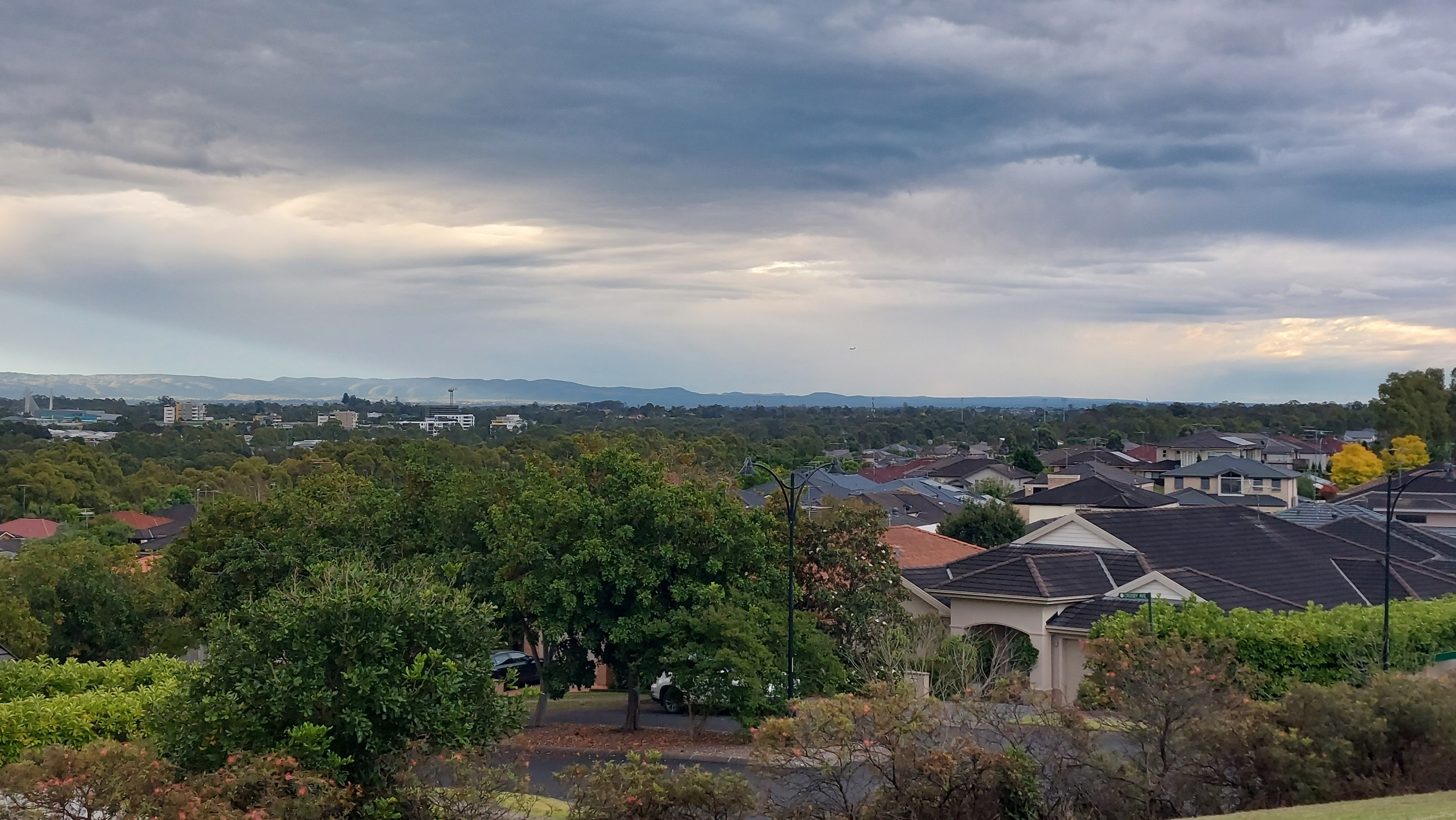
- Beaumont Hills as seen from Turkeys Nest Recreation Park in 2022

- Interactive map of Beaumont Hills
- Country: Australia
- State: New South Wales
- City: Sydney
- LGA: The Hills Shire
- Location: 40 km (25 mi) north west of Sydney CBD
- Established: 2002

Government
  - State electorate: Kellyville
  - Federal division: Mitchell

Area
  - Total: 3 km^{2} (1.2 sq mi)
- Elevation: 67 m (220 ft)

Population
  - Total: 9,041 (SAL 2021)
- Postcode: 2155
Suburbs around Beaumont Hills
Rouse Hill	Kellyville Ridge	Kellyville
Rouse Hill	Beaumont Hills	Kellyville
Schofields	Stanhope Gardens	Kellyville

Beaumont Hills is a suburb of Sydney, in the state of New South Wales, Australia 40 kilometres north west of the Sydney central business district, in the local government area of The Hills Shire. Beaumont Hills is part of the Greater Western Sydney region and the Hills District.

== History ==
Developed as a low-density residential suburb, Beaumont Hills was formerly part of the suburb of Kellyville. In 2002, Beaumont Hills became a separate suburb, as did Kellyville Ridge.

== Heritage listings ==
Beaumont Hills has a number of heritage-listed sites, including:

- Windsor Road: White Hart Inn Archaeological Site

== Demographics ==
According to the 2021 census, there were 9,041 residents in Beaumont Hills. 56.5% of people were born in Australia. The next most common countries of birth were India 6.0%, China 5.1%, Philippines 3.7%, South Africa 3.1%, and England 3.0%. 59.6% of people only spoke English at home. Other languages spoken at home included Mandarin 7.3%, Hindi 2.9%, Cantonese 2.3%, Arabic 2.1% and Persian 2.0%. The most common responses for religious affiliation were Catholic 27.9%, No Religion 23.9% and Anglican 10.5%.

== Residential areas ==
Beaumont Hills was developed in the early 2000s adopting its name sake in 2003, suburb featuring a number of housing estates. 'The Sanctuary' located to the west is fronted by a natural creek reserve. 'The Outlook' is at the centre. The suburb is developed with a range of house styles. Turkeys Nest Recreation Park has panoramic views all the way to the Blue Mountains. During periods of drought the lake atop Turkeys Nest can dry up, having last done so in 2018.

== Commercial area ==
Beaumont Hills Shopping Centre officially opened in September 2009.

== Education ==
Beaumont Hills Public School was established in 2006, as of 2024, it has just under 500 students.

Malek Fahd Islamic School has a campus located in Beaumont Hills, it opened in 2011. As of 2021 it had a capacity of 450 students.

== Public transport ==
CDC NSW provide several bus routes that run through Beaumont Hills (Mungerie Road, The Parkway, Brampton Drive) on a regular basis. There is also a local Metro Station located in nearby Kellyville.

=== CDC NSW ===
- Route 617 Rouse Hill – Kellyville
- Route 633 Rouse Hill – Pennant Hills
- Route 715 Rouse Hill – Seven Hills
- Route 664 is a Rouse Hill to Parramatta service, which stops at Beaumont Hills, however, the route goes via Kellyville, Bella Vista, the North-West T-Way and Westmead before it reaches Parramatta. The service from Parramatta can be taken from Beaumont Hills to the Rouse Hill Town Centre.
- Route 601 operates from Sanctuary Drive to Parramatta via Windsor Rd and Baulkham Hills.

The transport interchange at Rouse Hill Town Centre provides bus routes to many other places, including Windsor, Blacktown and Riverstone, operated by CDC NSW and Busways.

=== Sydney Metro Northwest ===
The Sydney Metro Northwest opened 26 May 2019. The closest stations are Kellyville, located on Old Windsor Road at Samantha Riley Drive, and Rouse Hill, which is located in the Rouse Hill Town Centre, adjacent to the transport interchange. Trains are operating every four minutes in peak times, with a potential for trains to operate for every two minutes.
