= Mark Hodges =

Australian politician

Mark Hodges MP
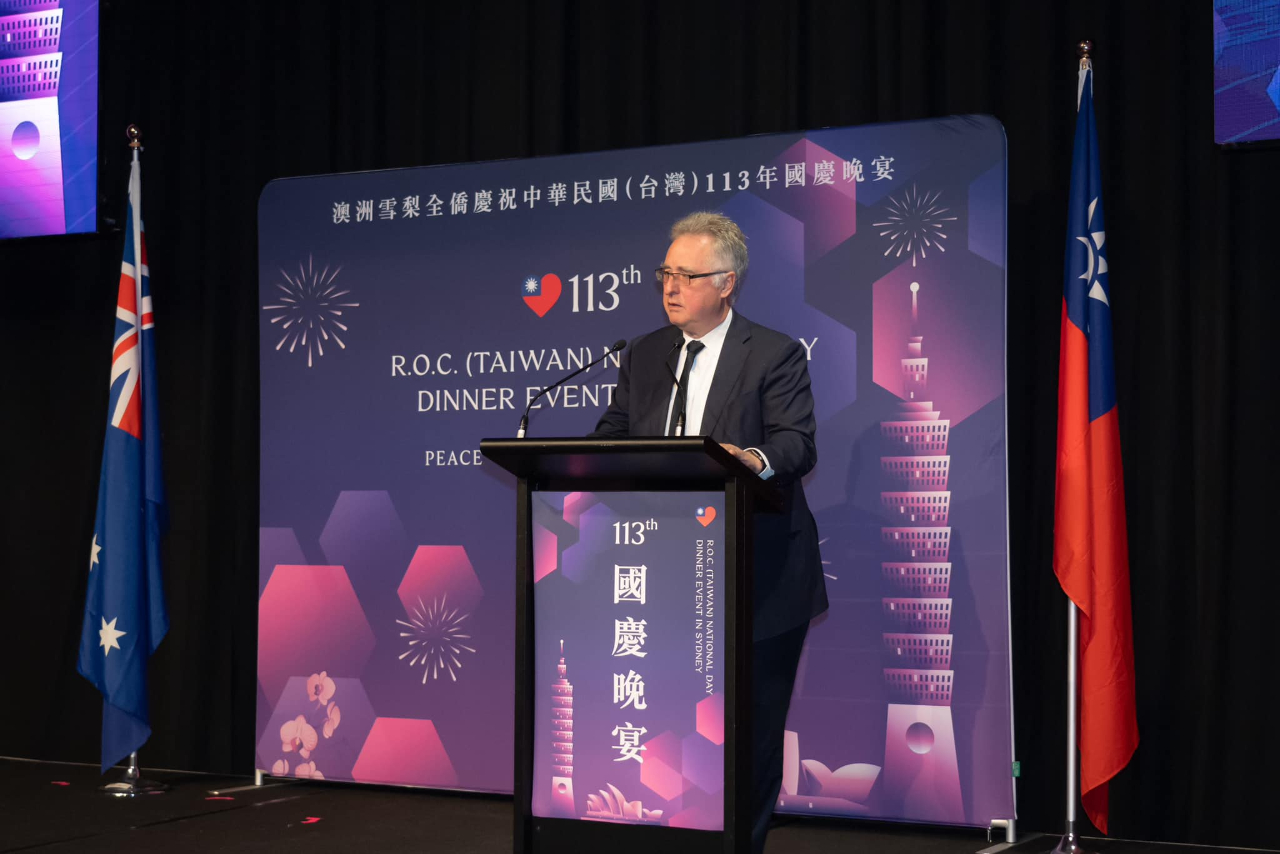
- Mark Hodges

Member of the New South Wales Assembly for Castle Hill
- Incumbent
- Assumed office 25 March 2023
- Preceded by: Ray Williams

Personal details
- Party: Liberal
- Domestic partner: Raylee

Mark Robert Hodges is an Australian politician. He was elected a member of the New South Wales Legislative Assembly representing Castle Hill for the Liberal Party in 2023.

== Professional career ==
Hodges joined the New South Wales Police Force in 1980. In January 2022, he was elected Deputy Mayor of The Hills Shire.

On 28 February 2026, it was unexpectedly announced that Hodges had not been selected as the Liberal Party candidate to contest his seat at the upcoming state elections; instead former Hills Shire Mayor Peter Gangemi was selected.
