= Kenthurst =

- Suburb
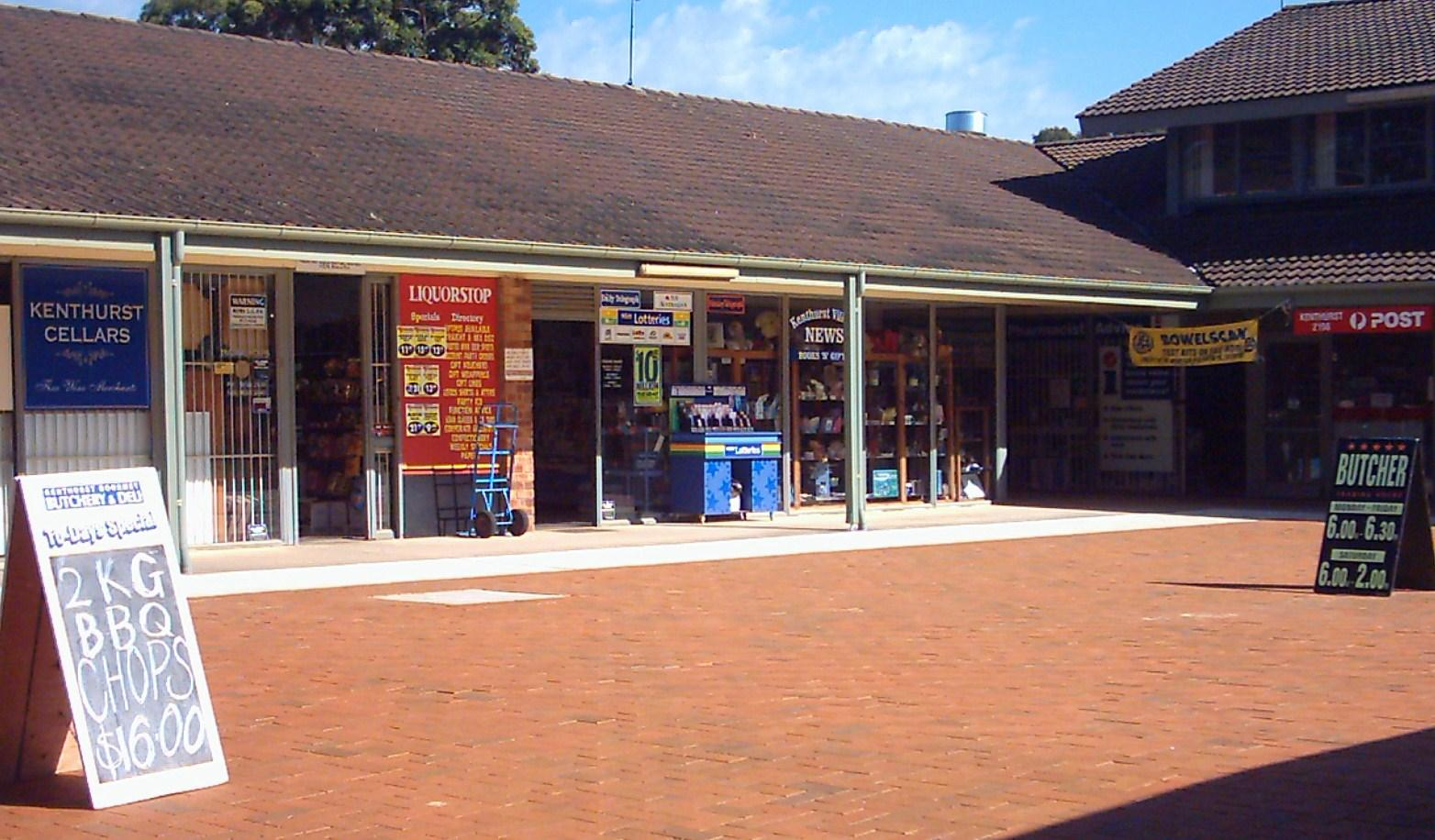
- Kenthurst Village Shops

- Interactive map of Kenthurst
- Country: Australia
- State: New South Wales
- City: Sydney
- LGA: The Hills Shire
- Location: 39 km (24 mi) north-west of Sydney CBD

Government
  - State electorate: Castle Hill
  - Federal division: Berowra
- Elevation: 137 m (449 ft)

Population
  - Total: 5,313 (2021 census)
- Postcode: 2156
Suburbs around Kenthurst
Annangrove	Glenorie	Middle Dural
Kellyville	Kenthurst	Dural
Kellyville	Glenhaven	Glenhaven

Kenthurst is a suburb of Sydney, in the state of New South Wales, Australia 39 kilometres north-west of the Sydney central business district in the local government area of The Hills Shire. It is part of the Hills District region.

Kenthurst is a semi-rural suburb with blocks of land on an average of 2 hectares (5 acres). Features of the suburb include a large park (Kenthurst Park), a shopping village and park complex, numerous schools, two petrol stations, a function centre, a rural fire service station and a public swimming pool. Home of the Kenthurst “Bush Boys” Soccer Club.

== History ==
The original inhabitants of the Dural area were the Darug people.

Kenthurst is derived from the English County of Kent and hurst meaning a woody hillock or clearing.

The area was originally known as Little Dooral and later Little Dural. In 1886 a public meeting was held to discuss a change of name. Charles Gibb was the main agitator who declared that the settlement needed a more elegant title. "Kent Forest" was suggested as an appropriate name for the area where settlers from Kent County that had settled in the area, but it wasn't popular and eventually Kenthurst was chosen. The meeting applied to the government ministry for permission to change the name, which was successful and was in general use from 1887.

In the 1890s, Dural and the Hills district was the chief supplier of citrus fruit for most of Australia. Poultry and vegetable farms also flourished.

Kenthurst Post Office opened on 1 August 1887.

== Shopping complex ==
The Kenthurst shopping complex features a post office, supermarket, butcher, bottle shop, hairdresser and other shops. Outside the village centre there are several preschools and a second real estate agent. There are numerous local businesses in the area such as timber yards, florist, wholesalers, earthmovers and other similar businesses.

== Village green ==
The village green is situated across Nelson St from the shopping village. It features a public swimming pool, a basketball/netball court, barbecue facilities, a playground, park benches and a large grassed area. The village green is maintained by Kenthurst Rotary

== Schools ==
Schools within Kenthurst include:

- Kenthurst Public School (public, primary)
- St Madeleine's (Catholic Systemic, primary)
- Marian College (Catholic Systemic, secondary)
- The Hills Grammar School (private, K-12)
- Kenthurst Preschool (community-based, not-for-profit)

== Sport and recreation ==
Kenthurst has its own cricket club, soccer club, netball club and village green maintained by Kenthurst Rotary.

The major sportsground in Kenthurst is Kenthurst Park. It is a multi-use reserve with 3 soccer fields, 2 cricket pitches and 4 tennis courts. This park is home to Kenthurst and Districts Football Club and Kenthurst Upper Hills Cricket Club.

There is no large netball centre within Kenthurst, so Kenthurst Netball Club plays games at the BHNA Complex, Kellyville.

== Demographics ==
At the 2021 census, the suburb of Kenthurst recorded a population of 5,313 residents. Of these:

Age distribution
The distribution of ages in Kenthurst was fairly similar to the country as a whole. Kenthurst residents' median age was 44 years, compared to the national median of 38. Children aged under 15 years made up 18.2% of the population (national average was 18.2%) and people aged 65 years and over made up 19.8% of the population (national average was 17.2%).
Ethnic diversity
77.5% of people were born in Australia. The next most common country of birth was England at 3.2%. 51.5% of people had both parents born in Australia. 82.2% of people spoke only English at home. Other languages spoken at home included Arabic at 2.2%.
Religion
The most common responses for religion were Catholic 35.7%, No Religion 24.3% and Anglican 15.5%.
Finances
The median weekly household income was $3,061, compared to the national median of $1,746. Real estate values were correspondingly high: the median mortgage repayments were $3,280 compared to the national median of $1,863.
Housing
Most (88.2%) private dwellings were family households and 11.5% were single-person households. Stand-alone houses accounted for 95.6% of dwellings. The average household size was 3.3 people.

== Agriculture ==
The suburb is home to a large number of whole-sale nurseries.

== Notable residents ==
- Don Burke (born 1947), television personality
- Andrew Leeds (born 1965), Australian rugby player
- James Millar (born 1980), theatre actor and writer
- Greg Page (born 1972), singer, musician and actor
