= Hunting Lodge, Rouse Hill =

Hunting Lodge
- Location within Sydney Location within Australia
- 33°39′53″S 150°54′50″E
- Location: The Water Lane, Rouse Hill, The Hills Shire, New South Wales, Australia

New South Wales Heritage Register
- Official name: Hunting Lodge (former); Hunting Lodge
- Type: State heritage (built)
- Designated: 2 April 1999
- Reference no.: 632
- Type: Other – Recreation & Entertainment
- Category: Recreation and Entertainment

The Hunting Lodge is a heritage-listed colonial era hunting lodge located at 58 The Water Lane in Rouse Hill New South Wales, a suburb of Sydney, Australia. It was added to the New South Wales State Heritage Register on 2 April 1999.

== History ==
The land on which the building is located was granted by Governor King to Governor Bligh in 1806 and ratified by Governor Macquarie. It was Bligh's private property and was named Copenhagen Farm after one of his sea battles.

Later in the century the property passed to the land holder and politician S. H. Terry (1833-1887) who possibly built the lodge in the 1860s or later. Through Terry the property is strongly associated with Rouse Hill House and Box Hill House. Terry was born at his family's Box Hill farm.

Local legend holds that the lodge was constructed by Governor Bligh, as the original land grant was given to him. It appears more likely it was constructed by the Terry family of Box Hill or one of their tenants who was a stonemason, but used the surrounding land as an orchard. Another possibility is that it was built by Henry Ferdinand Halloran who was mortgagee in possession for seven years; Halloran was renowned for building quirky structures on his estates.

Up to the 1970s the lodge had a small moat around it, presumably to keep animals away and possibly fire. It is not known when the moat was constructed but the present owner has filled it in. During the early 1970s there was an avenue of wattle trees leading from the gate to the house which the present owner has removed.

== Description ==
The building is a small, single storey sandstone cottage of Gothic/Baronial design (in the tradition of such follies) with an attic.

=== Modifications and dates ===
Up to the 1970s the lodge had a small moat around it, presumably to keep animals away and possibly fire. It is not known when the moat was constructed but the present owner has filled it in. During the early 1970s there was an avenue of wattle trees leading from the gate to the house which the present owner has removed.

It is understood that unsympathetic additions had been made to the house.

=== Further information ===
1986: zoned non-urban 1A under IDO no. 118 Baulkham Hills Shire. Minimum lot size is 40 hectares (99 acres).

== Heritage listing ==
As at 24 March 2010, the Hunting Lodge has both historic and architectural significance as follows:

1. for its associations with the early farms at Rouse Hill, Box Hill and Copenhagen Farm;
2. for its possible association with S. H. Terry, MLA, and;
3. for its rarity as a 19th-century hunting lodge and its associated elements including gothic/baronial design follies and the remains of a surrounding moat.

There are only three surviving buildings associated with the three early farms: Rouse Hill House, Box Hill House and the hunting lodge.

The Hunting Lodge was listed on the New South Wales State Heritage Register on 2 April 1999.

== See also ==
- History of Sydney
