= Electoral district of Castle Hill =

Castle Hill New South Wales—Legislative Assembly
- Interactive map of district boundaries from the 2023 state election
- State: New South Wales
- Created: 2007
- MP: Mark Hodges
- Party: Liberal Party
- Namesake: Castle Hill
- Electors: 60,394 (2023)
- Area: 99.95 km^{2} (38.6 sq mi)
- Demographic: Inner metropolitan
Electorates around Castle Hill:
Hawkesbury	Hawkesbury	Hornsby
Kellyville	Castle Hill	Hornsby
Winston Hills	Winston Hills; Epping	Epping

Castle Hill is an electoral district of the Legislative Assembly in the Australian state of New South Wales. It is represented by Mark Hodges of the Liberal Party.

It is a conservative urban electorate in the Hills District in Sydney's north west.

== History ==
The electorate formed during the redistribution in 2004 and replaced the former electorate of The Hills, which was abolished at the same time. It was first contested at the 2007 election, when it was won by Michael Richardson, previously the member for The Hills.

While the Hills District has long been Liberal heartland, Castle Hill is considered a particularly safe seat even by Hills standards. Counting its time as The Hills, the Liberals have always won an outright majority in this seat on the first count. In the first three elections after its creation, Labor was lucky to win 30 percent of the two-party vote.

After the 2015 election, it was the safest seat in the state, with a 29.4 percent swing needed for Labor to win it.

At the 2023 state election, the Liberals suffered a swing of 11.5 percent, but still retained it with 60.9 percent of the two-party vote. Labor managed 39.1 percent of the two-party vote, its best showing in the seat and its predecessors since winning 45 percent in The Hills during the "Wranslide" of 1978.

== Geography ==
On its current boundaries, Castle Hill takes in the suburbs of Annangrove, Glenhaven, Kenthurst, Glenorie, Castle Hill, Dural, Middle Dural, Baulkham Hills, and West Pennant Hills.

== Members for Castle Hill ==
Member	Party	Period
Michael Richardson	Liberal	2007–2011
Dominic Perrottet	Liberal	2011–2015
Ray Williams	Liberal	2015–2023
Mark Hodges	Liberal	2023–present

== Election results ==
2023 New South Wales state election: Castle Hill
Party	Candidate	Votes	%	±%
Liberal	Mark Hodges	27,085	50.7	−13.4
Labor	Tina Cartwright	15,159	28.4	+8.3
Greens	Tina Kordrostami	4,786	9.0	+0.5
Liberal Democrats	My Trinh	3,642	6.8	+6.8
Sustainable Australia	Eric Claus	1,403	2.6	−0.5
Independent	Nathan Organ	1,352	2.5	+2.5
Total formal votes		53,427	97.6	+0.1
Informal votes		1,300	2.4	−0.1
Turnout		54,727	90.6	−1.5
Two-party-preferred result
Liberal	Mark Hodges	29,223	60.9	−11.5
Labor	Tina Cartwright	18,760	39.1	+11.5
Liberal hold		Swing	−11.5	
