= Bella Vista, New South Wales =

Bella Vista
- Suburb
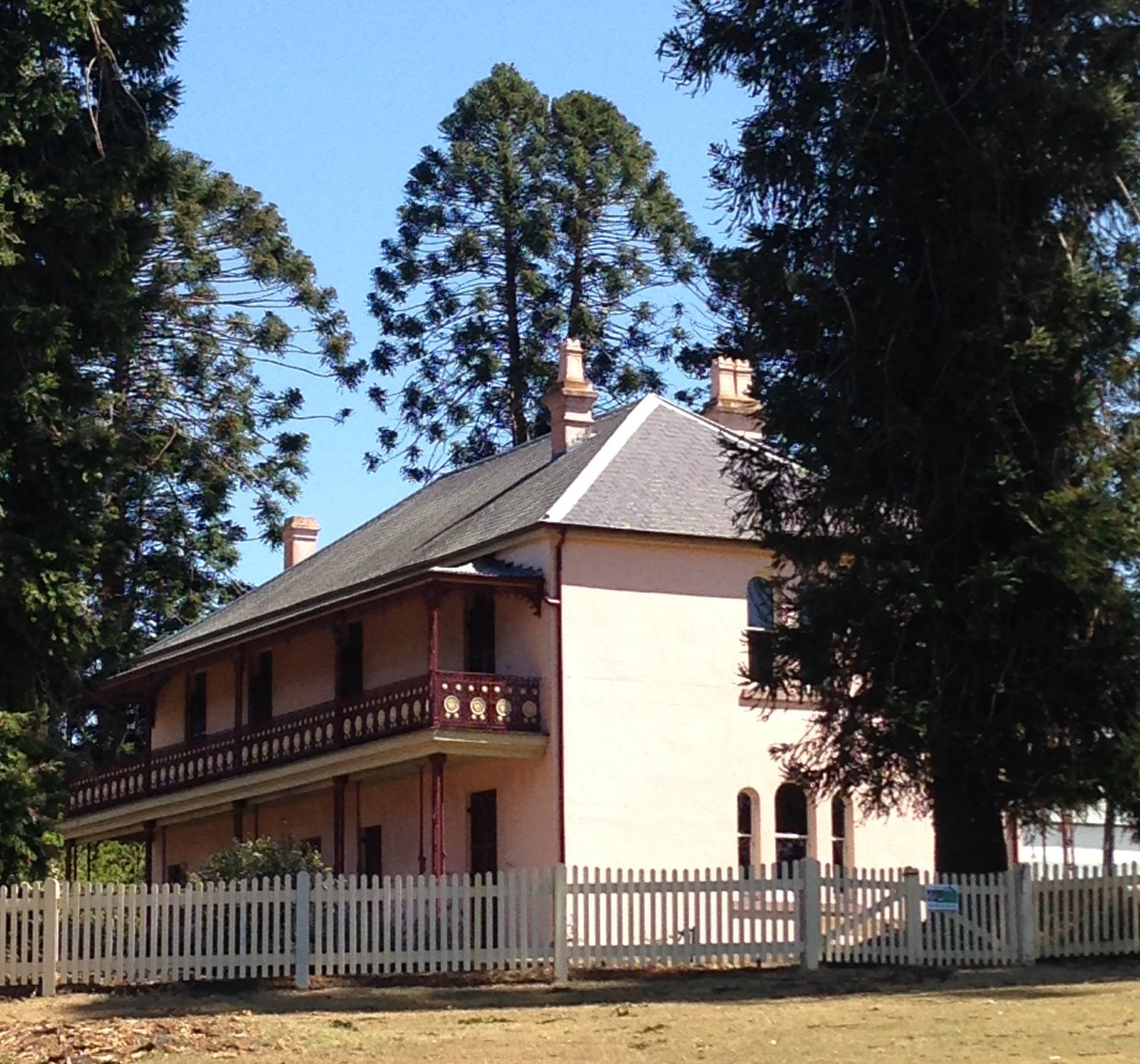
- Bella Vista Farm

- Interactive map of Bella Vista
- Country: Australia
- State: New South Wales
- City: Sydney
- LGA: The Hills Shire
- Location: 33 km (21 mi) northwest of Sydney CBD

Government
  - State electorate: Kellyville
  - Federal division: Mitchell
- Elevation: 77 m (253 ft)

Population
  - Total: 8,384 (2021 census)
- Postcode: 2153
Suburbs around Bella Vista
Stanhope Gardens	Kellyville	Norwest
Glenwood	Bella Vista	Norwest
Kings Langley	Seven Hills	Baulkham Hills

Bella Vista (Note: lit. 'Nice View' in Italian) is located 33 kilometres north-west of the Sydney central business district and is part of The Hills Shire. It is a suburb in the Hills District of Greater Western Sydney and is in the state of New South Wales, Australia. Bella Vista's Norwest Business Park is home to several Fortune 500 companies, a number of shopping centres, high-rise buildings, and industrial and recreational spaces.

== History ==
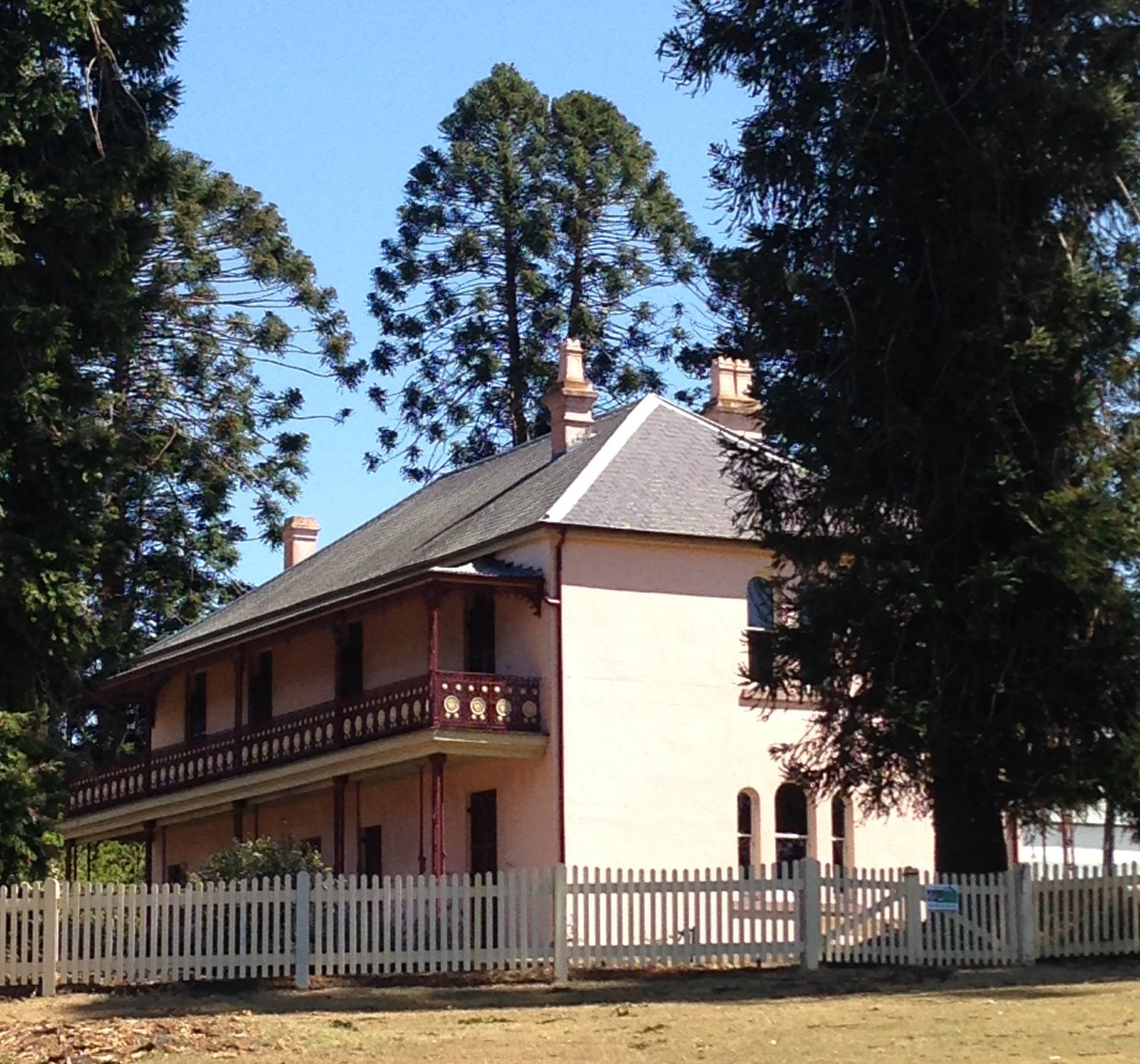
Bella Vista homestead, Bella Vista Farm Park, Norwest, NSW

In 1799 Joseph Foveaux was granted 400 hectares (980 acres) which, in addition to other purchases, he sold to John Macarthur in 1801. John Macarthur enlarged this through additional purchases until it comprised around 810 hectares (2,000 acres). John and Elizabeth Macarthur farmed sheep on this property in addition to their properties at Camden and Parramatta. For much of the time that the Marm The to Elizabeth to manage the various Macarthur properties and flocks. During this time reference is made by her to "my Seven Hills Farm".

Although claims are made by some that the Seven Hills Farm was used exclusively by the Macarthurs for the breeding of their merino flocks, this is clearly not the case as the documentary evidence of the Macarthur papers shows that their Merino rams were paddocked at Elizabeth Farm at Parramatta. The Seven Hills farm was isolated and stock there were always in danger from theft and aboriginal attack. Two of Macarthur's stockmen were killed on the farm by Indigenous Australians in 1805. In fact the sheep at the Macarthur's Seven Hills farm had their genesis in the 600 sheep which were purchased from Foveaux at the same time as the property. What can justifiably be claimed about the site is that it was one of the first major Australian sheep breeding farms and that the results later achieved at Camden with fine merino sheep only followed Elizabeth's efforts at Seven Hills. Part of this land was later acquired by the Pearce family and became known as Bella Vista.

All the buildings on the site today date from this period of its history with no extant buildings from the Macarthur period. In the 1890s, Edward Henry Pearce (1839–1912) of Bella Vista was declared the "largest and most successful orange grower in the colony." Bella Vista was sold by the Pearce family in 1950.

Until the mid-1990s, the area was primarily used for small-scale agriculture. Since then, significant changes have become apparent as it incorporates a residential area and a busy business district. However, the homestead and old farm buildings have been preserved and this portion of the former Pearce family property is now owned by The Hills Shire Council. The Friends of Bella Vista Farm Park has been formed and they are working actively to achieve the continued restoration of all buildings on this unique site.

== Heritage listings ==
Bella Vista has a number of heritage-listed sites, including:

- Elizabeth Macarthur Drive: Bella Vista (homestead)
- Seven Hills Road: Pearce Family Cemetery

== Demographics ==
According to the 2021 census, there were 8,384 residents in Bella Vista. 48.4% of residents were born in Australia. The other most common countries of birth were, India 10.7%, China 8.7%, Sri Lanka 4.5%, the Philippines 2.1% and England 1.9%. 43.7% of residents spoke only English at home. Other languages spoken at home included Mandarin 12.1%, Hindi 5.1%, Tamil 4.7%, Cantonese 4.3% and Punjabi 4.1%. The most common responses for religious affiliation were No Religion 23.2%, Catholic 21.1%, Hinduism 15.6%, and Islam 5.4%.

== Commercial area ==
The suburb has shopping complexes and a major hotel. It is rapidly becoming the main business centre within the Hills District. The biggest commercial area is the Norwest Business Park on Norwest Boulevard to the east. Norwest Business Park incorporates retail, commercial, industrial and hotel developments. The industrial areas in West Bella Vista are still heavily under development, with many new warehouses appearing recently.

=== Health services ===
Bella Vista has numerous established medical centres and dental surgeries, including Norwest Private Hospital on Norbrik Drive, and Hospital for Specialist Surgery located on Solent Circuit.

=== Shopping centres ===
Circa Retail is a shopping centre located near Old Windsor Road, featuring a Woolworths supermarket as the anchor tenant with 25 specialty stores.

=== Corporate hub ===
In 2006, Woolworths, a public Australian retail company, joined all of its sub-management offices into a $200 million complex in Norwest Business Park in Bella Vista, where their headquarters are now located. Homeart, another Australian retail chain, is also headquartered in Bella Vista.

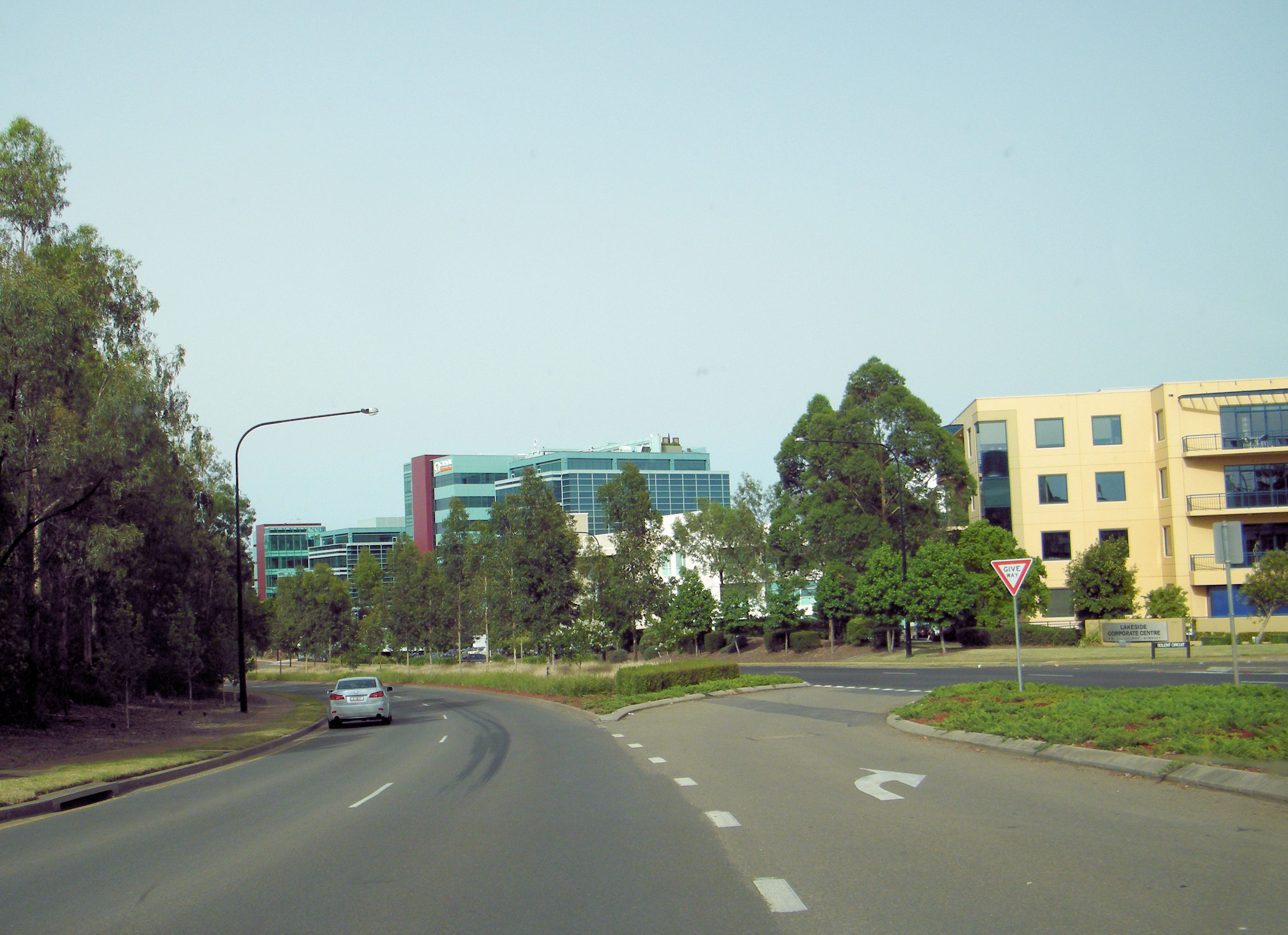
Norwest Boulevard

== Transport ==
A major factor in the recent growth of Bella Vista has been its prime location near the end of the Sydney M2 motorway. The motorway (opened in 1997) means that in very good traffic conditions it takes just over half an hour to get from Bella Vista to the CBD. This also puts Bella Vista close to two major north–south transport routes through Sydney, the Cumberland Highway and the Westlink M7.

Until the completion of the Sydney Metro Northwest buses were the only form of public transport available to Bella Vista residents. The suburb is serviced by private bus companies Busways and CDC NSW. Relatively frequent buses connect Bella Vista with the nearby hubs of Parramatta (bus numbers 660, 662, 663, 664 and 665), Castle Hill (bus numbers 730 and 662), Blacktown (bus number 730) and Seven Hills (bus numbers 714 and 715). There are also peak services available directly to St Marys (745), and the CBD (bus numbers 607X, 613X, and 614X). Many routes use the North-West T-way.

Two railway stations now service the area. Bella Vista railway station is located on the corner of Lexington Drive and Old Windsor Road, whilst Norwest railway station is located in the suburb of Norwest near Hillsong Church across the road from the Norwest Market town shopping centre. The Sydney Metro Northwest is now the main public transport line linking residents of north-western Sydney with Epping, Chatswood, North Sydney and the Sydney CBD. It has also improved access to Castle Hill, Norwest Business Park and Rouse Hill.

== Education ==
Bella Vista is close to many educational institutions including:

- Bella Vista Public School
- Baulkham Hills High School
- Crestwood High School
- Crestwood Public School
- Gilroy Catholic College
- Glenwood High School
- Hillsong Church operates the Hillsong International Leadership College
- Matthew Pearce Public School
- Model Farms High School
- St Michael's Primary School

== Churches ==
Nearby churches include:

- Hillsong Church, located in Norwest Business Park
- Norwest Anglican Church
- St Michael's Catholic Church in Baulkham Hills

== See also ==
- Windsor Road Monster
