= Glenhaven, New South Wales =

Glenhaven
- Suburb
- Interactive map of Glenhaven
- Country: Australia
- State: New South Wales
- LGA: The Hills Shire
- Location: 32 km (20 mi) NW of Sydney CBD

Government
  - State electorate: Castle Hill
  - Federal divisions: Mitchell; Berowra
- Elevation: 146 m (479 ft)

Population
  - Total: 6,619 (2021)
- Postcode: 2156
Suburbs around Glenhaven
Annangrove	Kenthurst	Kenthurst
Kellyville	Glenhaven	Dural
Castle Hill	Castle Hill	Dural

Glenhaven is a semi rural suburb of Sydney, in the state of New South Wales, Australia 32 kilometres north-west of the Sydney central business district in the local government area of The Hills Shire, part of the Hills District.

== History ==
The area was originally called Sandhurst, which remains Glenhaven's most prominent street. Crego Road, which runs off Sandhurst is the highest. There was some confusion with mail because of a suburb in Melbourne with the same name. A public meeting was held to have the name changed to reflect its valley location. The upper portion of the valley was known as "The Glen", and the lower portion as "The Haven", hence the choice Glenhaven.

Glenhaven is on the route of the Great North Road that linked Parramatta with the Hunter Valley. John Evans, one of the first settlers in the area, used a bullock team to drag timber, and the route he used became known as Evans Road. The area had many wild flowers, including waratahs, Christmas bush, boronias, native roses, and a variety of orchids which thrived there.

Sandhurst Post Office opened on 11 July 1892 and was renamed Glenhaven on 1 January 1893. It closed in 1972.

== Schools ==
Glenhaven has one school

- Glenhaven Public School

== Transport ==
Glenhaven is served by four CDC NSW bus routes:

- 603 from Rouse Hill Town Centre to Parramatta via Castle Hill and vice versa services most of the suburb.
- 637 to Castle Hill services the eastern portion of the suburb
- 638 to Castle Hill services the eastern portion of the suburb
- 652X service to the Queen Victoria Building via West Pennant Hills and the M2 runs during peak hour.

The Metro North West & Bankstown Line from Chatswood to Tallawong is the serving train line with the closest station being Hills Showground.

== Housing ==
Glenhaven is a leafy suburb with large homes on large blocks of land. On the east side of Old Northern Road semi-rural acreages are present, as well as a retirement village and the Flower Power Garden Centre. Since half the suburb is located on a ridge 180-200m high, the higher terrain homes have picturesque panoramas of the Blue Mountains looking out to the west.

== Population ==
=== Demographics ===
According to the 2021 census, the small suburb of Glenhaven had a population of 6,619 people. Of these:

- Sex distribution: 48.6% were male and 51.4% were female.
- Age distribution: The median age was 48 years, compared to the national median of 38 years.
- Ethnic diversity: 72.3% of people were born in Australia. The next most common countries of birth were England 5.4%, China 2.0%, India 1.8%, New Zealand 1.3% and South Africa 1.3%. 82.7% of people spoke only English at home.
- Religion: The most common responses for religion were Catholic 31.0%, No Religion 24.7% and Anglican 19.7%.
- Finances: The median household weekly income was $2,532, compared to the national median of $1,746. The median mortgage payment in Glenhaven is $3,080 per month, compared to the national median of $1,863.

=== Notable residents ===
- John Marks, former Australian tennis player
- Delta Goodrem, singer and actress
- Dieter Brummer, actor
- Brian Houston, pastor
- Nathan Hindmarsh, rugby league player
- Greg Page, original Yellow member of The Wiggles
- Lleyton Hewitt and Bec Hewitt

== Glenhaven Rural Fire brigade ==
Glenhaven Rural Fire Brigade is a volunteer fire brigade with the New South Wales Rural Fire Service. It currently has approximately 50 members. The brigade has a Category 1 tankers, a Category 7 tanker and a personnel carrier.
