= The Hills Shire =

- Local government area
- Location in Metropolitan Sydney

- Interactive map of The Hills Shire
- Coordinates: 33°46′S 151°00′E
- Country: Australia
- State: New South Wales
- Region: Hills District
- Established: 6 March 1906
- Council seat: Norwest

Government
  - Mayor: Dr. Michelle Byrne (Liberal)
  - State electorates: Castle Hill; Hawkesbury; Kellyville; Parramatta; Winston Hills
  - Federal divisions: Berowra; Mitchell; Parramatta

Area
  - Total: 386 km^{2} (149 sq mi)

Population
  - Total: 191,876 (2021 census)
  - Density: 497.1/km^{2} (1,287.5/sq mi)
- Time zone: UTC+10 (AEST)
  - Summer (DST): UTC+11 (AEDT)
- Website: The Hills Shire
LGAs around The Hills Shire
| Hawkesbury | Central Coast Council | Hornsby |
| Hawkesbury | The Hills Shire | Hornsby |
| Blacktown | Parramatta | Parramatta |

The Hills Shire (known until 2008 as Baulkham Hills Shire) is a local government area in the Greater Sydney region of Sydney, New South Wales, Australia. The area is north-west of the Sydney central business district, and encompasses 401 square kilometres (155 sq mi) stretching from the M2 Hills Motorway in the south to Wisemans Ferry on the Hawkesbury River in the north. The Hills Shire had a population of 191,876 as of the 2021 census.

The current mayor of The Hills Shire is Dr Michelle Byrne (Liberal), who was elected on 14 September 2024.

The Hills Shire is a member council of the Hawkesbury River County Council.

== Suburbs in the local government area ==
Suburbs at least partially within The Hills Shire are:

- Annangrove
- Baulkham Hills (shared with City of Parramatta)
- Beaumont Hills
- Bella Vista
- Box Hill
- Canoelands (shared with Hornsby Shire)
- Castle Hill (shared with Hornsby Shire)
- Cattai (shared with City of Hawkesbury)
- Dural (shared with Hornsby Shire)
- Gables
- Glenhaven (shared with Hornsby Shire)
- Glenorie (shared with Hornsby Shire)
- Kellyville
- Kenthurst
- Leets Vale (shared with City of Hawkesbury)
- Lower Portland (shared with City of Hawkesbury)
- Maraylya (shared with City of Hawkesbury)
- Maroota (shared with Hornsby Shire)
- Middle Dural (shared with Hornsby Shire)
- Nelson
- North Kellyville
- North Rocks (shared with City of Parramatta)
- Norwest (council seat)
- Rouse Hill (shared with City of Blacktown)
- Sackville North
- South Maroota
- West Pennant Hills (shared with Hornsby Shire)
- Winston Hills (shared with City of Parramatta)
- Wisemans Ferry (shared with Central Coast Council, City of Hawkesbury and Hornsby Shire)

== Demographics ==
At the 2021 census, there were 191,876 people in The Hills local government area; of these 49.3 per cent were male and 50.7 per cent were female. Aboriginal and Torres Strait Islander people made up 0.6 per cent of the population; significantly below the NSW and Australian averages of 3.4 and 3.2 per cent respectively. The median age of people in The Hills Shire was 38 years. Children aged 0 – 14 years made up 21.2 per cent of the population and people aged 65 years and over made up 14.8 per cent of the population. Of all people in The Hills, 61.3 per cent were married and 7.3 per cent were either divorced or separated.

Population growth in The Hills Shire between the 2001 census and the 2006 census was 15.2 per cent; and in the subsequent five years to the 2011 census, population growth was 6.58 per cent. At the 2016 census, the population in the Shire decreased by 7.43 per cent, brought about by a reduction in the Shire area from 401 square kilometres (155 sq mi) to 386 square kilometres (149 sq mi) due to the 2015 review of local government boundaries when former parts of The Hills Shire were transferred to the City of Parramatta Council. Total population growth of Australia for the period between the 2011 and 2016 census periods was 8.8 per cent. The median weekly income for residents within The Hills Shire was approximately 150% higher than the national average.

At the 2016 census, the proportion of residents in The Hills local government area who stated their ancestry as Australian or Anglo-Saxon approached 32 per cent of all residents. About 25.3 per cent of all residents in The Hills Shire nominated a religious affiliation with Catholicism at the 2021 census, which was in excess of the national average of 20.0 per cent. Meanwhile, as at the 2016 census date, compared to the national average, households in The Hills local government area had a higher than average proportion (37.2 per cent) where two or more languages are spoken (national average was 22.2 per cent); and a lower proportion (65.3 per cent) where English only was spoken at home (national average was 72.7 per cent).

Selected historical census data for The Hills local government area
| Census year | | 2001 | 2006 | 2011 | 2016 | 2021 |
|---|---|---|---|---|---|---|
| Population | Estimated residents on census night | 138,420 | ▲159,391 | ▲169,872 | ▼157,243 | ▲191,876 |
| Population | LGA rank in terms of size within New South Wales | | | 9th | ▼15th | |
| Population | % of New South Wales population | | | 2.46% | ▼2.02% | |
| Population | % of Australian population | 0.74% | ▲0.80% | ▼0.79% | ▼0.67% | |
| Cultural and language diversity | | | | | | |
| Ancestry, top responses | English | | | 21.5% | ▼20.4% | ▲22.6% |
| Ancestry, top responses | Australian | | | 22.1% | ▼19.1% | ▲22.0% |
| Ancestry, top responses | Chinese | | | 8.5% | ▲9.6% | ▲14.7% |
| Ancestry, top responses | Irish | | | 6.5% | ▲6.6% | ▲6.9% |
| Ancestry, top responses | Scottish | | | 5.4% | ▼5.3% | - |
| Language, top responses (other than English) | Mandarin | 1.5% | ▲2.4% | ▲3.9% | ▲6.4% | ▲8.2% |
| Language, top responses (other than English) | Cantonese | 4.4% | ▲4.5% | ▼4.4% | ▼3.4% | 3.4% |
| Language, top responses (other than English) | Korean | 1.3% | ▲1.6% | ▲2.1% | ▼2.0% | ▲2.1% |
| Language, top responses (other than English) | Hindi | 0.6% | ▲0.9% | ▲1.3% | ▲1.9% | ▲2.8% |
| Language, top responses (other than English) | Arabic | 1.6% | ▲1.8% | ▲1.9% | ▼1.7% | ▲2.0% |
| Religious affiliation | | | | | | |
| Religious affiliation, top responses | Catholic | 32.3% | ▲32.5% | ▼31.4% | ▼28.9% | ▼25.3% |
| Religious affiliation, top responses | No religion, so described | 10.4% | ▲12.5% | ▲15.7% | ▲21.2% | ▲26.7% |
| Religious affiliation, top responses | Anglican | 22.7% | ▼20.0% | ▼18.5% | ▼14.9% | ▼10.9% |
| Religious affiliation, top responses | Not stated | - | - | - | 5.9% | - |
| Religious affiliation, top responses | Hinduism | 1.6% | ▲2.4% | ▲3.1% | ▲4.5% | ▲7.9% |
| Median weekly incomes | | | | | | |
| Personal income | Median weekly personal income | - | $625 | ▲$719 | ▲$827 | ▲$1,033 |
| Personal income | % of Australian median income | | 134.1% | ▼124.6% | ▲124.9% | |
| Family income | Median weekly family income | - | $1,732 | ▲$2,188 | ▲$2,464 | ▲$2,990 |
| Family income | % of Australian median income | | 168.6% | ▼147.7% | ▼142.1% | |
| Household income | Median weekly household income | - | $1,847 | ▲$2,044 | ▲$2,363 | ▲$2,831 |
| Household income | % of Australian median income | - | 157.7% | ▲165.6% | ▼164.3% | |

== Council ==
A map of the four wards, showing party representation in each ward as of the 2021 local elections.

The Hills Shire Council is composed of twelve councillors elected proportionally as four separate wards, each electing three councillors. All councillors are elected for a fixed four-year term of office. A referendum held on 1 September 2015 changed the system of electing the mayor, from annual election by the councillors in favour of direct election of the mayor by electors for a four-year term, which took effect from the September 2017 election. The most recent election was held on 15 October 2021, and the makeup of the council is as follows:

| Party | Councillors |
|---|---|
| Liberal Party of Australia | 9 |
| Australian Labor Party | 3 |
| Australian Greens | 1 |
| Total | 13 |

The current Council, elected in 2017, in order of election by ward, is:

| Ward | Councillor | Party | Notes |
|---|---|---|---|
| Mayor | Peter Gangemi | Liberal | Mayor (2013–2014, 2015–2016; Deputy Mayor 2014–2015) |
| Central Ward | Jessica Brazier | Liberal | |
| Central Ward | Mark Hodges | Liberal | State MP for Castle Hill |
| Central Ward | Tony Hay OAM | Labor | |
| East Ward | Ryan Tracey | Labor | |
| East Ward | Jerome Cox | Liberal | |
| East Ward | Reena Jethi | Liberal | |
| North Ward | Virginia Ellis | Liberal | |
| North Ward | Mitchell Blue | Liberal | |
| North Ward | Mila Kasby | Greens | |
| West Ward | Barbara Burton | Labor | |
| West Ward | Rosemarie Boneham | Liberal | |
| West Ward | Frank de Masi | Liberal | |

== Election results ==
=== 2024 ===
2024 New South Wales local elections: The Hills
| Party | Votes | % | Swing | Seats | Change |
|---|---|---|---|---|---|
| Liberal | 68,058 | 61.3 | +0.7 | 8 | Steady |
| Labor | 25,945 | 23.4 | +2.8 | 3 | Steady |
| Greens | 15,237 | 13.7 | −3.1 | 1 | Steady |
| Independents | 1,795 | 1.6 | −0.3 | 0 | Steady |
| Formal votes | 111,035 | 95.0 | | | |
| Informal votes | 5,865 | 5.0 | | | |
| Total | 116,900 | | | | |

== History ==
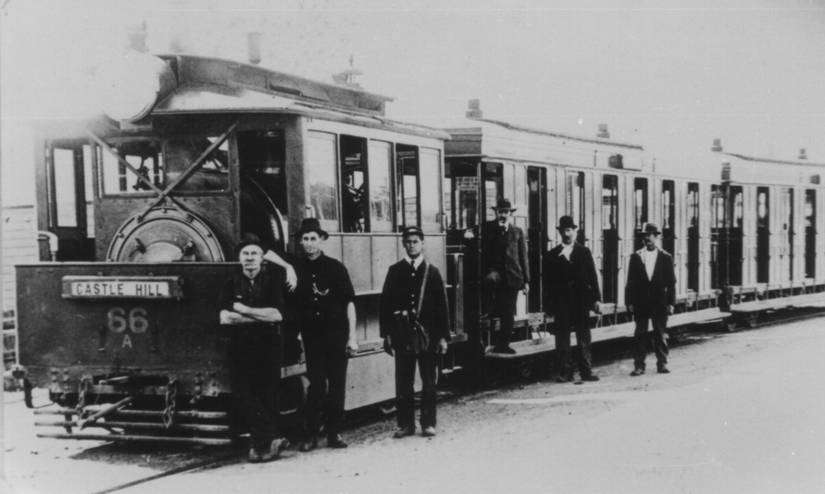
The tram to Parramatta at Castle Hill in 1910

The earliest records of human settlement date back to the early 1800s when the Dharug people inhabited the region. Governor Arthur Phillip is said to be the first European to have visited the Hills in 1788. The Hills Shire started developing gradually with its new road systems and farming as more Europeans settled here. The first school started in 1840 followed by a general store and a post office. In 1902, the tram from Parramatta to Baulkham Hills was inaugurated and telephone links were established by 1907. The population rose steadily over the years along with infrastructure development of the Hills Shire.

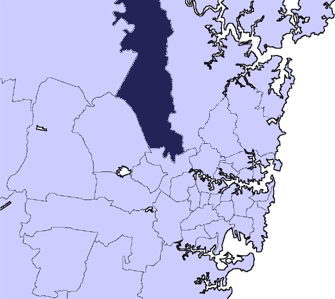
Hills Shire boundaries, 1906–2016.

A 2015 review of local government boundaries by the NSW Government Independent Pricing and Regulatory Tribunal (IPART) recommended that The Hills Shire merge with adjoining councils. The government considered two proposals. The first proposed a merger of parts of The Hills with the Hawkesbury City Council to form a new council with an area of 3,161 square kilometres (1,220 sq mi) and support a population of approximately 224,000. The second proposed a merger of parts of Parramatta, Auburn, The Hills, Hornsby, and Holroyd to form a new council with an area of 82 square kilometres (32 sq mi) and support a population of approximately 215,725. Following an independent review, on 12 May 2016 the Minister for Local Government announced that the merger of parts of The Hills Shire suburbs south of the M2 Motorway (North Rocks, Northmead and part of Baulkham Hills) with the City of Parramatta to form a revised City of Parramatta Council, with immediate effect. Other proposals impacting The Hills Shire were rejected by the Government.

In June 2020, Councillor Brooke Collins made national news for controversially objecting to the Welcome to Country, reportedly stating "How do you know they didn’t wipe out another race when they arrived here 70,000 years ago?".

== Heritage listings ==
The Hills Shire has a number of heritage-listed sites, including:

- Baulkham Hills, Seven Hills Road: Pearce Family Cemetery
- Bella Vista, Elizabeth Macarthur Drive: Bella Vista (homestead)
- Box Hill, 10 Terry Road: Box Hill House
- Box Hill, Windsor Road: Box Hill Inn
- Castle Hill, Gilbert Road: Third Government Farm
- Castle Hill, 221 Old Northern Road: St Paul's Anglican Church, Castle Hill (former)
- Cattai, Wisemans Ferry Road: Cattai Estate
- Maroota South, Wisemans Ferry Road: Great Drain
- Rouse Hill, The Water Lane: Hunting Lodge, Rouse Hill
- Rouse Hill, Windsor Road: Royal Oak Inn, Rouse Hill

== Recent controversies ==
In 2020, the Hills Shire Council, whose local government area covers Darug land, caused controversy by rejecting requests to include an Acknowledgment of Country at its meetings. The Hills Shire Council is the only Sydney local council that does not include an Acknowledgment of Country at its meetings. This was later overturned with support from a new Mayor.

In 2022, allegations were made of branch stacking in the Council in collusion with property developers, namely "...serious allegations of collusion between members of the Liberal party and a developer to replace elected members of The Hills Shire Council with new councillors who would be more amenable to that developer's interests". The New South Wales Parliament Legislative Council Portfolio Committee found illegal meetings had taken place between councillors and a developer, but recommended the matter be escalated in 2023, given the deliberate non-cooperation of key witnesses and councillors in giving evidence.

== See also ==
- Hills District
- Hills Centre
- Greater Western Sydney
