= Electoral district of Kellyville =

Electoral district of the Legislative Assembly New South Wales, Australia

Kellyville New South Wales—Legislative Assembly
- Interactive map of district boundaries from the 2023 state election
- State: New South Wales
- Created: 2023
- MP: Ray Williams
- Party: Liberal
- Namesake: Kellyville
- Electors: 58,999 (2023)
- Area: 38.70 km^{2} (14.9 sq mi)
- Coordinates: 33°42′36″S 150°57′11″E
Electorates around Kellyville:
Hawkesbury	Castle Hill	Castle Hill
Riverstone	Kellyville	Castle Hill
Winston Hills	Winston Hills	Castle Hill

Kellyville is an electoral district of the Legislative Assembly in the Australian state of New South Wales. It was contested for the first time at the 2023 election.

It is a conservative urban electorate in the Hills District in Sydney's north west.

== History ==
Kellyville was created as a result of the 2021 redistribution. The electorate of Baulkham Hills was abolished, and much of it was transferred to Kellyville. The remainder of Kellyville comprises parts of the former Castle Hill. Based on the results of the 2019 election, it was a very safe seat for the Liberal Party with an estimated notional margin of 23.1 percent.

Ray Williams was elected in the 2023 New South Wales state election in which he represented the seat of Kellyville until his resignation from NSW Parliament on 20 October 2026.

== Geography ==
On its current boundaries, Kellyville takes in the suburbs of Beaumont Hills, Bella Vista, Kellyville, North Kellyville, Norwest and parts of Baulkham Hills, Castle Hill and Rouse Hill.

== Members for Kellyville ==
Member	Party	Term
Ray Williams	Liberal	2023–present

== Election results ==
2023 New South Wales state election: Kellyville
Party	Candidate	Votes	%	±%
Liberal	Ray Williams	29,450	55.4	−11.1
Labor	Alex Karki	16,571	31.2	+9.6
Greens	Thelma Ghayyem	4,235	8.0	+1.2
Sustainable Australia	Heather Boyd	1,569	2.9	−0.1
Animal Justice	Ingrid Akkari	1,368	2.6	+1.6
Total formal votes		53,193	97.7	+0.1
Informal votes		1,273	2.3	−0.1
Turnout		54,466	92.3	+4.3
Two-party-preferred result
Liberal	Ray Williams	30,682	61.0	−12.1
Labor	Alex Karki	19,653	39.0	+12.1
Liberal hold		Swing	−12.1	
