= Rouse Hill =

- Suburb
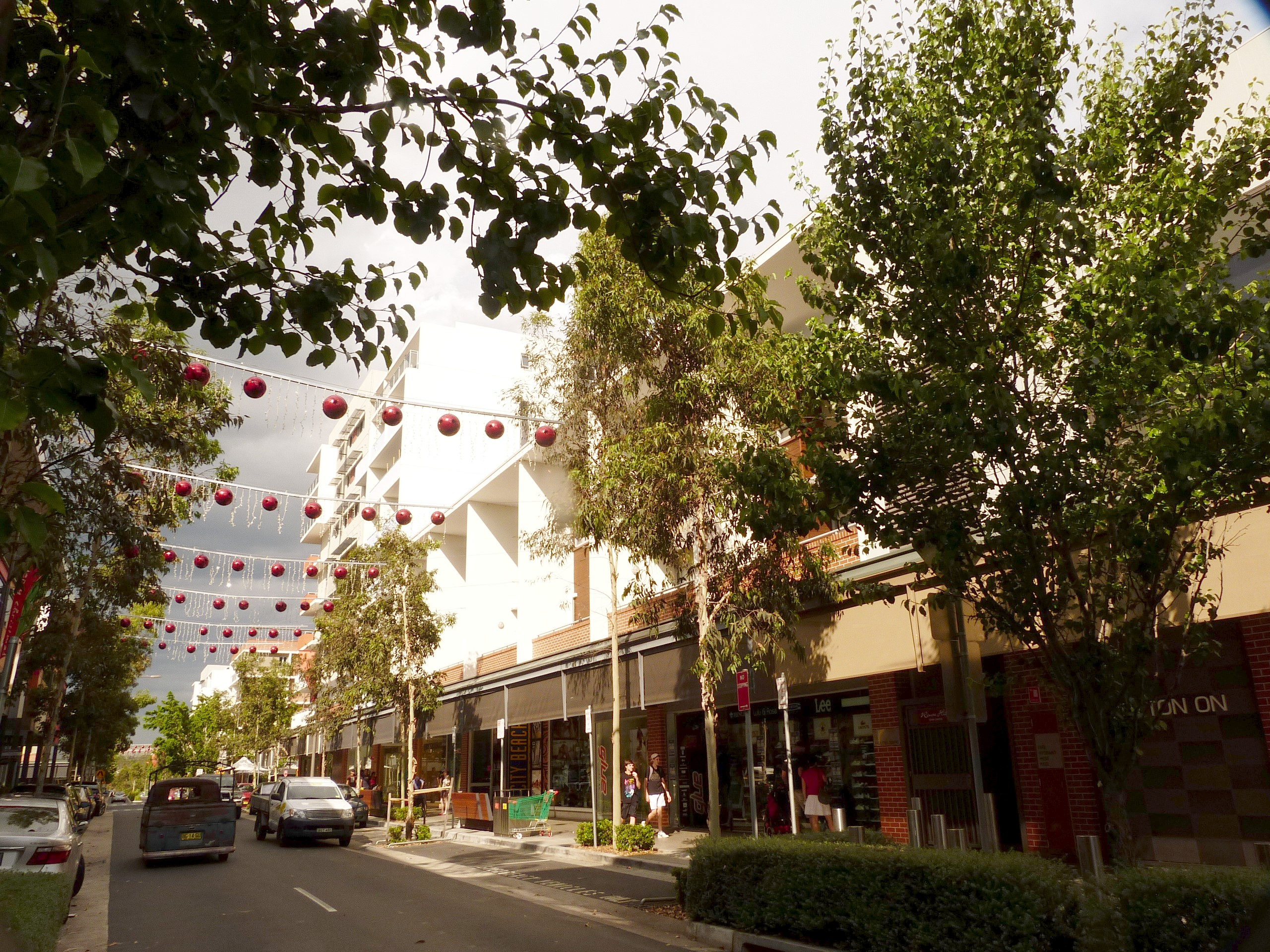
- Main Street, Rouse Hill Town Centre shopping centre, 2010

- Interactive map of Rouse Hill
- Country: Australia
- State: New South Wales
- City: Sydney
- LGAs: The Hills Shire; City of Blacktown
- Location: 43.1 km (26.8 mi) north-west of Sydney CBD; 19.2 km (11.9 mi) north-west of Parramatta CBD; 13.3 km (8.3 mi) south-west of Windsor
- Established: 1802

Government
  - State electorates: Hawkesbury; Kellyville; Riverstone
  - Federal division: Greenway

Area
  - Total: 6.37 km^{2} (2.46 sq mi)
- Elevation: 49 m (161 ft)

Population
  - Total: 11,349 (SAL 2021)
  - Density: 1,401/km^{2} (3,630/sq mi)
- Postcode: 2155
Suburbs around Rouse Hill
Box Hill	Nelson	Annangrove
Riverstone	Rouse Hill	North Kellyville
Schofields	The Ponds; Kellyville Ridge	Beaumont Hills

Rouse Hill (/ˈraʊz/) is a suburb of Sydney, in the state of New South Wales, Australia. Rouse Hill is located in the Hills District, 43 kilometres north-west of the Sydney central business district and 19 kilometres north-west of the Parramatta central business district. It is in the local government areas of The Hills Shire and City of Blacktown.

== History ==
Rouse Hill (sometimes named Rouse's Hill in older sources) encompasses what was called the Village of Aberdour along with the area that became known as 'Vinegar Hill' following the convict rebellion of 1804.

Rouse Hill is noteworthy in Australian history as the site of the main battle during an Irish convict rebellion, known as the Castle Hill rebellion or the 'Second Battle of Vinegar Hill'.

=== Pre-European colonisation ===
The area now called Rouse Hill was originally home to the Bediagal people of the Dharug nation. There have been archeological excavations in Rouse Hill which have discovered silcrete stone tools. The closest natural silcrete deposits are in nearby Riverstone and along Plumpton Ridge in Schofields. Trends identified across the archeological sites in Rouse Hill indicate that the people in the area preferred to be in elevated sections in the lower part of valleys. Here they would've still received sun in winter, but would have been sheltered from winds, and far enough away from creeks to avoid mosquitoes.

=== 19th century ===
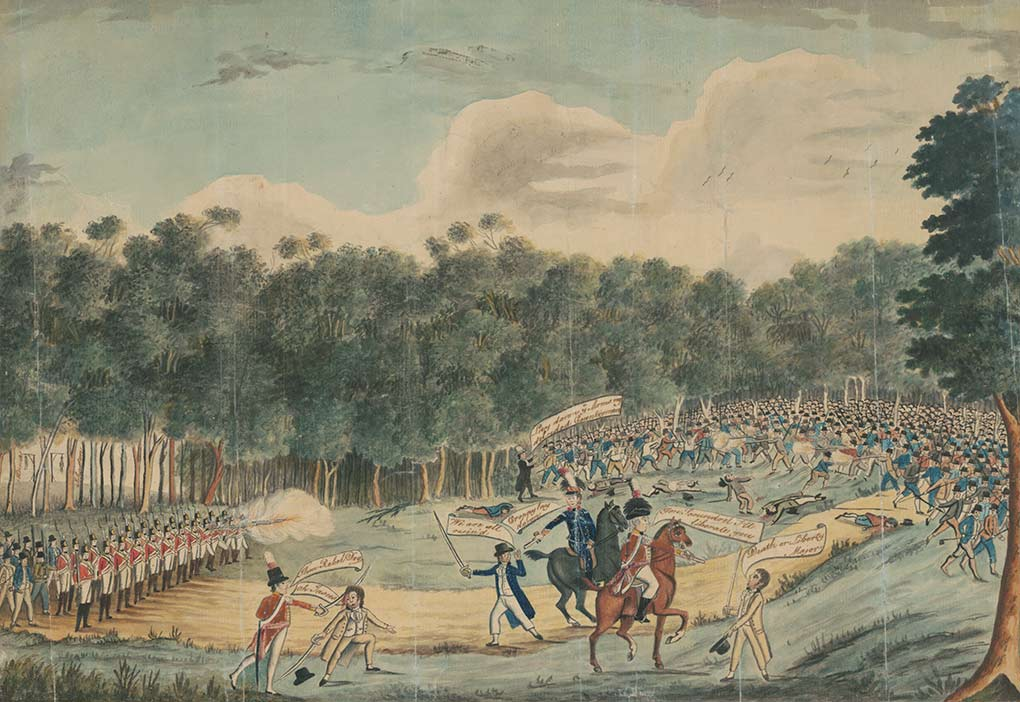
A 1804 watercolour depicting the 'Second Battle of Vinegar Hill'.

On 4 March 1804, Irish convicts including political prisoners transported for participating in the Irish Rebellion of 1798, broke out of the Government Farm at Castle Hill, aiming to seize control of the area and to capture Parramatta. The uprising was crushed by the military authorities at Rouse Hill the following day with at least fifteen rebels killed during the battle. Nine of the rebel leaders were executed and hundreds were punished. The exact site of the Battle is uncertain but a monument with a plaque commemorating the event can be seen within Castlebrook Lawn Cemetery on Windsor Road in Kellyville Ridge.

The name Rouse Hill perpetuates the name of Richard Rouse (1774-1852), a public servant and free settler, who received a grant of land in the area. Rouse arrived in the colony in 1801. In October 1816 he was granted 450 acres at Vinegar Hill (named after the 1804 convict insurrection). Rouse had taken possession of the land at an earlier date because he began building his family home there in 1813. There were ongoing official efforts to dispense with the name Vinegar Hill, due to the association with the 1804 uprising. Governor Macquarie changed the name of the locality to Rouse Hill, but the alternate name Vinegar Hill persisted until at least the 1860s.

In 1813 a toll gate was placed on Windsor Road in Rouse Hill, with one also installed at the other end of Windsor Road in Parramatta. The toll gates begun operation in 1814. The first daily mail coach between Windsor and Sydney commenced in 1831. A change of horses was made at the Rouse Hill Hotel, at that time kept by the publican John Booth (known as 'Crockery Bill').

Vinegar Hill Post Office opened on 1 October 1857 and was renamed Rouse Hill on 13 April 1858.

On 14 December 1862, William Cowper opened Christ Church for divine service. The church had been constructed earlier in the year on land donated by the Rouse family. From 1863 the church building was additionally used as a school, until 1888 when Rouse Hill Public School opened.

The Rouse Hill Hotel closed in 1891.

=== 20th century ===
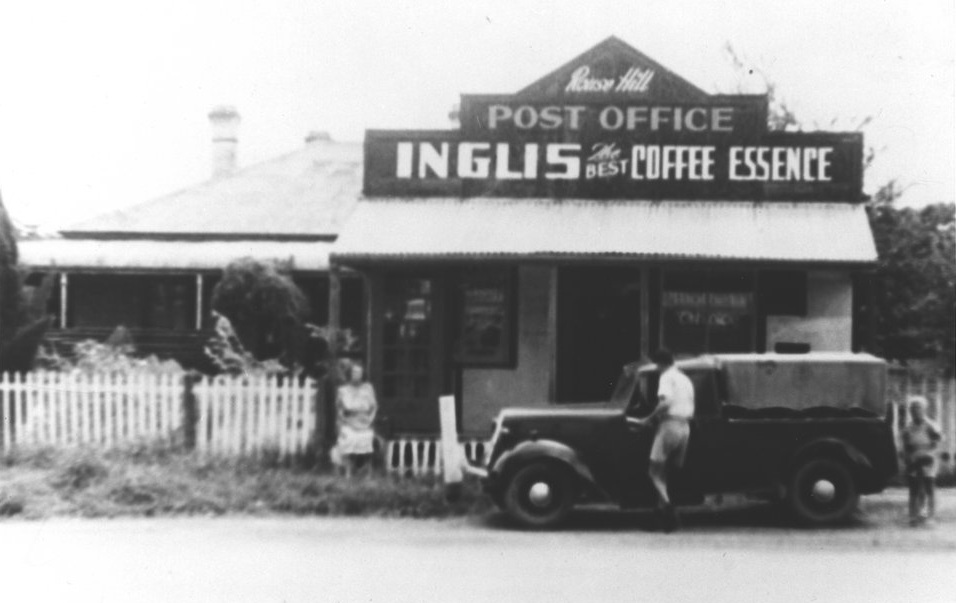
The Rouse Hill Post Office in 1951.

By 1928 Rouse Hill had a population of 150.

After requests from Rouse Hill residents throughout 1945, the first bus service between Parramatta and Rouse Hill opened in 1946.

In 1965, Rouse Hill had grown into village. There were at the time two bus services (one to Parramatta and one to Riverstone), and Rouse Hill Public school had three teachers and 85 students.

During the 1974–75 bushfire season, fires affected the Hills Shire and the City of Blacktown. In Rouse Hill on 28 January 1975 at least three fires, all in a four kilometre radius, started within 10 minutes of each other.

In 1986, Rouse Hill was selected as an area for suburban growth by the NSW government. Rouse Hill area had been considered for this as early as 1968. The town was selected primarily due to it being less prone to flooding than surrounding areas.

=== 21st century ===
At the beginning of the 21st century Rouse Hill had a population of 3,166. The first two decades of the century saw a massive growth in population of the suburb up to a population of 11,349 in 2021.

In 2002, Rouse Hill Anglican College was opened on the corner of Rouse Road and Worcester Road.

In 2008, Bruce Purser Reserve opened along Withers Road. The ground is home to the Sydney Football League team East Coast Eagles.

In 2021, Rouse Hill was selected as the location to build a new hospital. Construction of the hospital begun in February 2026.

== Heritage listings ==
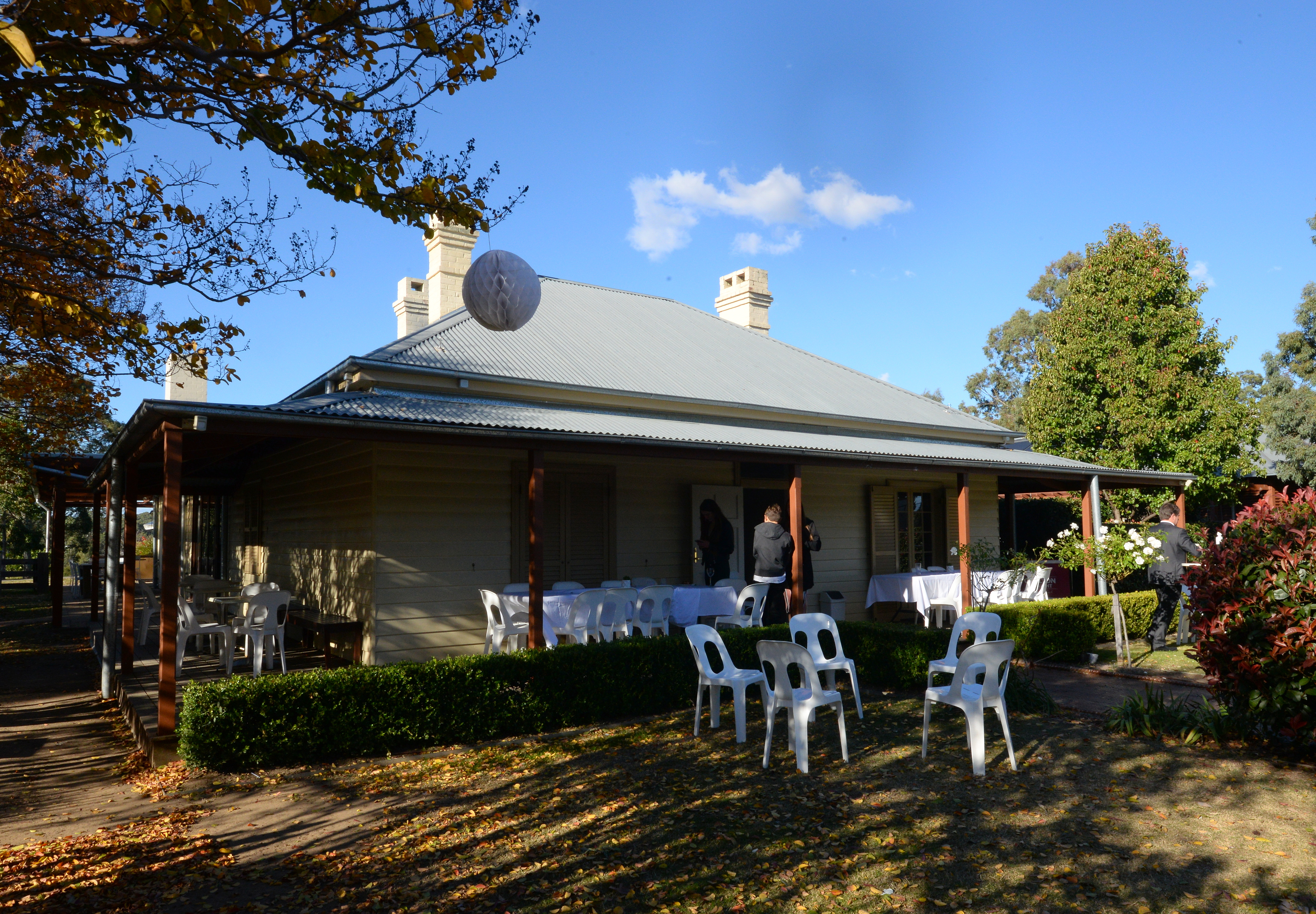
Mungerie House, Rouse Hill, a heritage-listed farmstead dating back to 1890

Rouse Hill has a number of heritage-listed sites, including:

=== Items listed under NSW Heritage Act s. 136 ===
- Hunting Lodge, Rouse Hill
- Royal Oak Inn, Rouse Hill
- Rouse Hill House and Farm

=== Items listed under NSW Heritage Act s. 170 ===
- Mungerie House, Rouse Hill

=== Local Government Schedule 1 ===
- Aberdoon House, Rouse Hill
- Christ Church, Rouse Hill
- 288 Annangrove Rd, Rouse Hill
- Private Burial Ground, Rouse Hill

== Rouse Hill House ==
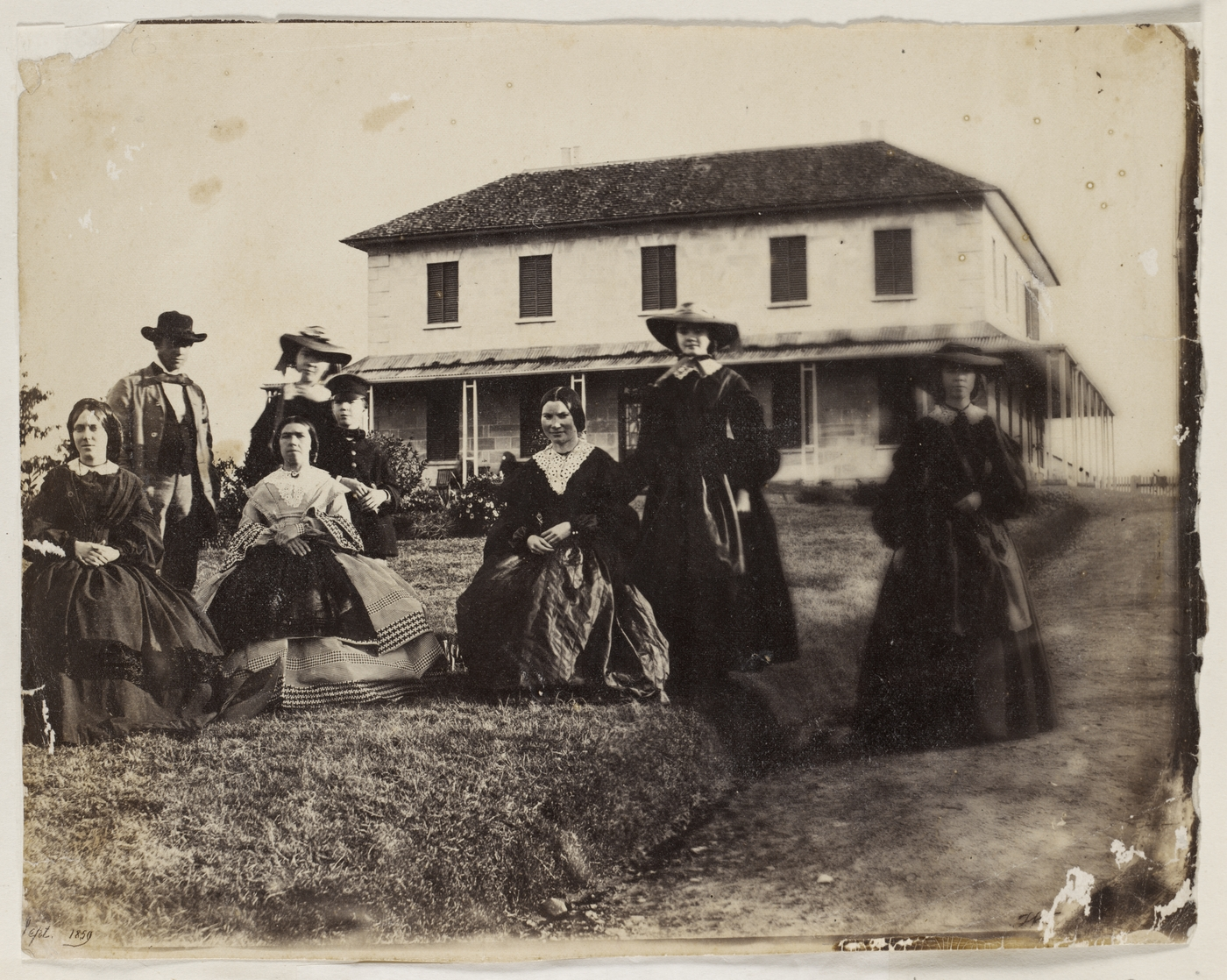
Rouse family in front of Rouse Hill House, in 1859.

Richard Rouse built his Australian Georgian home, Rouse Hill House, from 1813 to 1818. Service wings and an arcaded courtyard were added c. 1863. The simple, geometric layout of the garden is probably the oldest surviving in Australia. The house, its immediate surviving estate and outbuildings including stables designed by John Horbury Hunt, is now a house museum cared for by Sydney Living Museums, and is listed on the New South Wales State Heritage Register, and the former Register of the National Estate. Much of the family memorabilia has been preserved, including dolls, clothes and writings of the two girls, Nina (1875–1968) and Kathleen Rouse (1878–1932). These form a unique and fascinating record of late-Victorian Australian childhood, and inspired Ursula Dubosarsky's prize-winning novel "Abyssinia".

== Commercial area ==
Rouse Hill Town Centre built on the old golf course is the town centre, owned and managed by The GPT Group, is located at the intersection of White Hart Drive and Windsor Roads. Construction on the Rouse Hill Town Centre started in April 2006. The first stage was opened in September 2007, with the launch of the town centre on 6 March 2008. The first stage comprises Woolworths and Coles supermarkets, a food terrace, and 80 specialty stores. The second stage comprises Big W, Target (now Kmart), Reading Cinemas, an additional 130 specialty stores, a Community Centre, Library, Medical Centre, commercial and residential accommodation and the Secret Garden. The development has been integrated with the North-West T-way and Rouse Hill railway station opened in 2019.

Rouse Hill Village Centre which opened in 1999, is a small shopping centre located on Windsor Road. This complex features a major discount supermarket chain selling packaged groceries and perishables, as well as specialty shops and restaurants. The Terrace is another small shopping centre which was opened on Panmure Street in 2004.

== Places of Worship ==
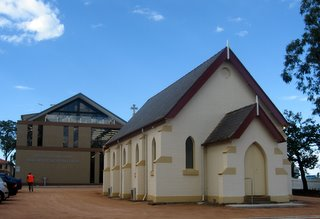
Rouse Hill Anglican Church

=== Christian ===
- Rouse Hill Anglican Church, located on Windsor Road, was built in 1862 for the United Church of England and Ireland. It was a church, school, and the centre of most community events. In 1875, the school was relocated from the church and established as Rouse Hill Public School on the corner of Windsor Road and Annangrove Road, and then relocated once again in 2003 to its present site. In 2008, a Ministry and Education Centre opened alongside the restored Christ Church and the old hall built in 1908.
- Rouse Hill Baptist Church, established in 2019 from the merger of two neighbouring Baptist churches and moved into the current site at 320 Annangrove Rd, Rouse Hill. The church is affiliated with the Baptist Association of NSW & the ACT.
- Rouse Hill Salvation Army Corps which is at 6a Edwards Rd, Nelson - just outside of Rouse Hill proper.
- C3 Church Rouse Hill which meets at Rouse Hill Public School.
- Mile End Community Church, Seventh Day Adventist, which currently meets on the Rouse Hill Baptist Church premises while their Mile End Rd site is redeveloped.
- Engage Community Church, Churches of Christ at 1/595 Withers Rd, Rouse Hill.

=== Islamic ===
- Rouse Hill Musallah, part of the Sydney North West Muslim Community. Located at 14/589 Withers Rd, Rouse Hill. The musalla does not offer jummuah.

== Education ==
- Ironbark Ridge Public – Public Primary School
- Our Lady of the Angels Primary – Catholic Primary School
- Rouse Hill Anglican College – K–12 co-educational Anglican day independent school
- Rouse Hill High – Public High School
- Rouse Hill Public – Public Primary School

== Transport ==
Rouse Hill is bisected by Windsor Road, which is now a major 4-lane road running from North Parramatta north-west to Windsor. Most residents of Rouse Hill are reliant on private cars for transport, with a high number of households having two or more cars.

CDC NSW provides services to Sydney CBD, North Sydney, Parramatta, Macquarie Park, and Castle Hill. Busways provides services to Blacktown, Riverstone, Mount Druitt and Castle Hill. CDC NSW also provides weekday services from Rouse Hill to Windsor. In September 2007, the North-West T-way opened, providing a bus rapid transit service to Parramatta railway station.

The Sydney Metro Northwest provides high frequency rail services to Sydenham via the major centres of Castle Hill, Chatswood and the Sydney CBD. Rouse Hill station is located within the suburb.

== Demographics ==
At the 2021 census, the suburb of Rouse Hill recorded a population of 11,349 people. Of these:

- Age distribution: Residents had a distinct bias towards young families compared to the country overall. The median age was 34 years, compared to the national median of 38 years. Children aged under 15 years made up 20.8% of the population (the national average was 18.2%) and people aged 65 years and over made up 7.4% of the population (the national average was 17.2%).
- Ethnic diversity: 58.0% of all people in this area were born in Australia; the next most common countries of birth included India 6.2%, China (excluding Special Administrative Regions and Taiwan) 4.4%, the Philippines 3.6%, England 2.3%, and South Africa 2.1%. 61.2% of people only spoke English at home; other languages spoken at home included Mandarin 5.3%, Hindi 2.5%, Persian (excluding Dari) 2.3%, Cantonese 2.0%, and Tagalog 1.9%.
- Religion: The most common responses for religion included No Religion 26.8%, Catholic 24.7%, Anglican 10.8, Hinduism 6.7%, and Islam 5.4%.
- Finances: The median household weekly income was $2,643, compared to the national median of $1,746. This difference is also reflected in real estate, with the median mortgage payment being $2,730 per month, compared to the national median of $1,863.
- Transport: On the day of the Census, 4.3% of employed people traveled to work on public transport, 38.4% by car either as driver or as passenger and 41.8% of people worked at home; this is in comparison to the 2016 Census when COVID-19 Work From Home restrictions were not in place, when the amount of employees that traveled to work via public transport was 11.9% and the amount of employees using a car to get to work to work either as a passenger or driving was 73.4%, 5.4% of employees worked at home.
- Housing: 54.4% of occupied private dwellings were separate houses, 19.9% were semi-detached, row or terrace house, townhouse etc and 25.4% were flats or apartments. The average household size was 3.0 people.
