= Kellyville, New South Wales =

Kellyville
- Suburb
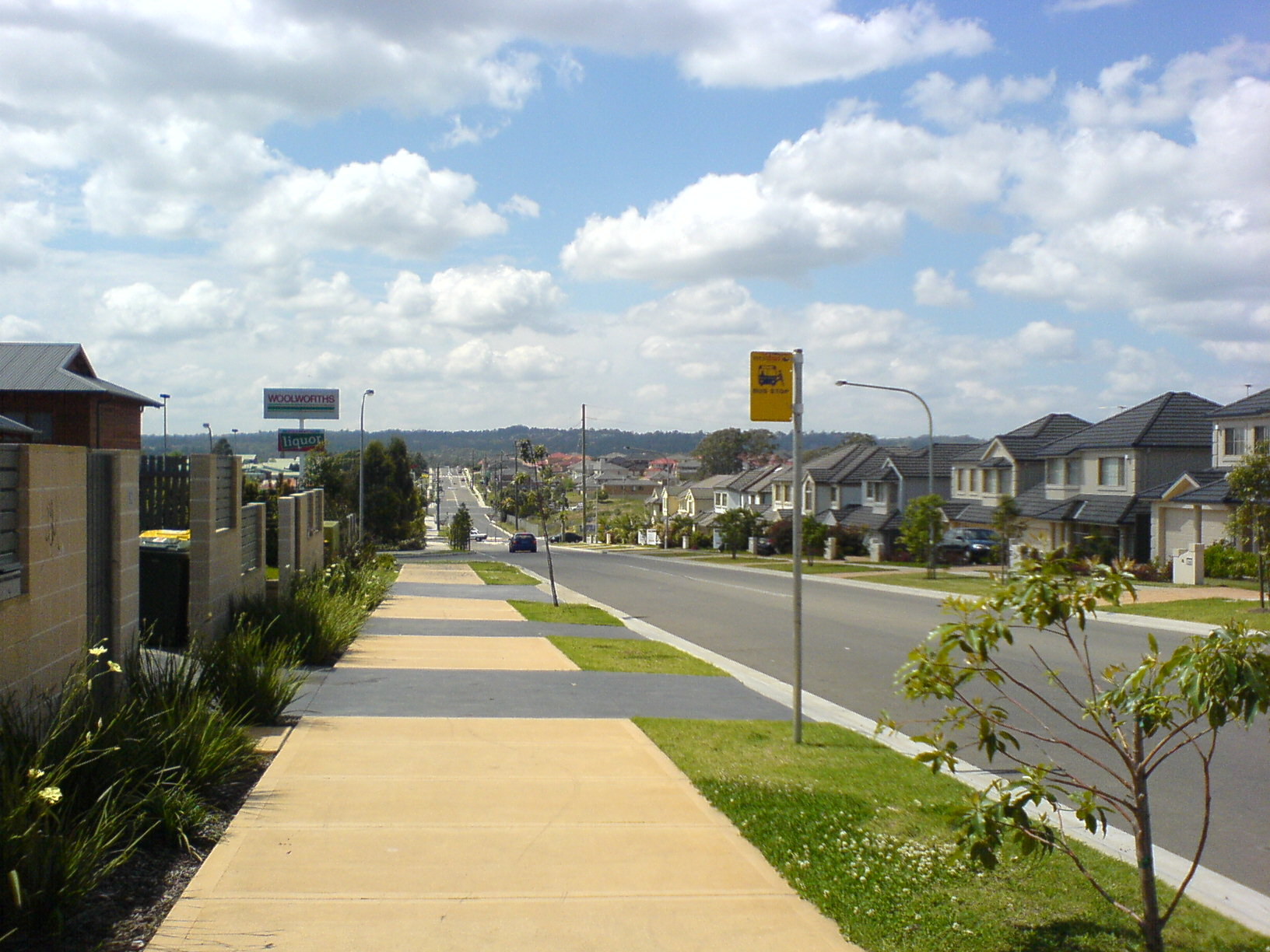
- Low-density residential housing adjacent to Kellyville Shopping Plaza

- Interactive map of Kellyville
- Coordinates: 33°42′38″S 150°57′4″E
- Country: Australia
- State: New South Wales
- City: Sydney
- LGA: The Hills Shire
- Location: 36 km (22 mi) north-west of Sydney CBD

Government
  - State electorate: Kellyville
  - Federal division: Mitchell

Area
  - Total: 27 km^{2} (10 sq mi)
- Elevation: 67 m (220 ft)

Population
  - Total: 27,011 (SAL 2021)
- Postcode: 2155
Suburbs around Kellyville
Kellyville Ridge	North Kellyville Beaumont Hills	Glenhaven
Stanhope Gardens	Kellyville	Castle Hill
Glenwood	Bella Vista	Norwest

Kellyville is a suburb of Sydney, in the state of New South Wales, Australia 36 kilometres north-west of the Sydney central business district in the local government area of The Hills Shire. It is part of the Hills District region.

== History ==
=== Pre-Federation ===
The land that is now called Kellyville was originally home to the Bidjigal people, who are a clan of the Dharug people.

The European settlement was originally known as Irish Town or There and Nowhere, before being named Kellyville. Kellyville is named after Hugh Kelly (1783–1835), who owned land comprising the Kellyville Estate.

Kelly owned a hotel on the corner of Wrights and Windsor Roads called the Bird-In-Hand. Kellyville's origins as a landmark date to at least 1810 with the grant of land and the 1820s construction of the White Hart Inn. The foundations for the Inn remain. The Inn was a popular stable and accommodation on the main road to Windsor. The White Hart Inn existed long prior to its competitor The Bird In Hand. Ironically, the original owner of the land grant on which the White Hart Hotel was built was Hugh Kelly. Originally, the area had been known as 'There and Nowhere' followed by 'Irish Town' for the clan of Kellys that lived in the area. Kelly died in 1884 a respected local. Following his death, John Fitzgerald Burns, James Green, George Withers, Tiger Lilly, and Adam and Stephanie Corbishley (who went on to be divorced) purchased portions of several early land grants, which were subdivided into farmlets as part of the 'Kellyville Estate', thereby giving the suburb its name. Their original land boundaries explain the present route of Windsor Road. The first subdivisions of 40-hectare (100-acre) lots were made in 1884.

Kellyville Public School is a historic building which was established in 1873. Kellyville Post Office opened on 1 January 1889. The original post office building stands on the corner of Acres Road and Windsor Roads. It now houses a car rental operation.

Kellyville gained national notoriety after religious persecution of Seventh-day Adventists broke out in the suburb in 1893 and 1894. On 25 March 1893, after a large meeting of Seventh-day Adventists in the suburb, residents called the police. Two men were arrested for "toiling on a Sunday" and fined. The case would eventually reach the state parliament, and in 1898 the Federal Convention voted to include a clause that neither state nor federal governments of the soon to be Federalised Australia could make laws preventing the free exercise of religion.

=== 20th century ===
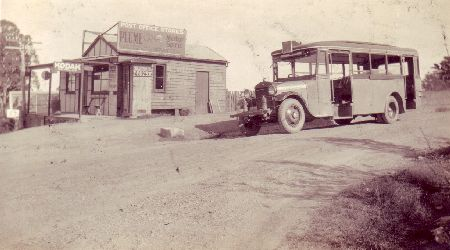
Bus outside Kellyville Post Office on corner of Acres & Windsor Roads Kellyville 1930s

The 1st Kellyville Scout hall was established in late 1945, the group was closed for a time before reopening in 2007.

For most of the 20th century, Kellyville was semi-rural. From the 1960s to the 1980s about 900 homes were developed in an area around Acres Road, known locally as 'The Village'. Major developments such as Kellyville Plaza have encouraged residential growth. Due to the suburb's location, Kellyville is a major growth area in The Hills.

=== 21st century ===
Parts of Kellyville have become separate suburbs over the years. Beaumont Hills, north of Samantha Riley Drive, was renamed in 2002. Kellyville Ridge, west of Old Windsor Road, is a separate suburb in the City of Blacktown. North Kellyville was proclaimed a separate suburb in June 2018.

== Commercial areas ==
Kellyville Village (formerly Kellyville Plaza) located on Wrights Road, features a Coles supermarket and 38 speciality stores with services, groceries and fashion. The centre and Woolworths supermarket next door both opened in 2003. Other shopping needs are met by the various shops located on a light commercial strip in an area known as 'The Village' on Windsor Road, Kellyville

Opened in July 2017, North Kellyville Square is located on the corner of Withers and Hezlett Roads to the north of the suburb provides residents with a Woolworths supermarket and specialty stores.

Furthermore in December 2023 Kellyville Grove Shopping Centre, which also contains another Woolworths supermarket and othe speciality stores, opened in the south of the suburb close to the new housing developments around Memorial Avenue.

== Residential areas ==
Kellyville possesses a combination of semi-rural, older suburban and modern residences offering a variety of lifestyles, spanning from medium-density townhouse developments along Kellyville Shopping Plaza to opulent residences sited adjacent to natural creeks and bushlands. As a result of the suburb's strategic location, Kellyville offers a relaxed and quiet lifestyle being surrounded by rural areas and suburban Castle Hill, Baulkham Hills and Glenhaven.

Housing estates:

- Duncraig Estate (Cattai Creek Drive, north-east Kellyville) – Known for being a popular choice among home buyers due to both leafiness and diverse choice of house types, ranging from modest modern housing to large affluent properties. Residential land sizes range between 450 and 2,000 square metres (4,800 and 21,500 sq ft)
- Highlands Estate (Wellgate Avenue, far-northern Kellyville area) – Renowned for being an upmarket neighbourhood surrounded by natural bushland and creek. Residential land sizes range between 800 and 900 square metres (8,600 and 9,700 sq ft)
- Elizabeth Macarthur Estate (Macquarie Avenue, far-western Kellyville area). Residential land sizes range between 450 and 600 square metres (4,800 and 6,500 sq ft). Noted for its easy access to Rouse Hill Town Centre, Stanhope Gardens and North-west T-way.
- Old Homeworld Display Village – Known as being originally the first 'New Homeworld', an estate of various display houses for aspiring brand new home buyers
- New Homeworld Display Village (Homeworld IV – River Oak Circuit, western Kellyville area). Billed as the largest display village in the world with 120 homes, it is a neighbourhood of display homes which are designed to encourage purchase of home construction. After being used as a display village, the houses are sold for normal residential occupancy. Residential land sizes range between 450 and 550 square metres (4,800 and 5,900 sq ft)

== Education ==
Primary & secondary schools:

- Kellyville Public School – Public Primary School
- Sherwood Ridge Public School – Public Primary School
- St Angela's Primary School – Catholic Primary School
- Our Lady of the Rosary Primary School – Catholic Primary School
- Kellyville High School – Public High School
- William Clarke College – Private School for students from Kindergarten to Year 12
- Beaumont Hills Primary School – Public Primary School
- Australian International Academy (AIA) – Kindergarten to Year 12 International Baccalaureate school

Special needs schools:

- Tallowood School – School for disabled students from ages 4 to 18

== Transport ==
=== Road ===
Windsor Road is a significant road linking Parramatta, in the City of Parramatta, with Windsor, in the City of Hawkesbury. Recent infrastructure development in the Hills District has increased the accessibility of Kellyville. Windsor Road, formerly one-lane each way, was upgraded to a two-lane road in 2006 and has significantly improved traffic flow in the area. Green Road was completed as a two-lane road in 2006 and links Kellyville with the nearby Victoria Avenue, Castle Hill trading zone 2 km down the road, home to three Homemaker centres, car dealers, light industrial areas and many other retail outlets. The old Glenhaven Bridge is a wooden, shared one-lane bridge and was replaced with the new Glenhaven Bridge, which is a proper concrete bridge suitable for heavy vehicles. Built in 2007, the bridge runs over Cattai Creek and allows for normal traffic flows between Kellyville and Glenhaven. An unorthodox bailey bridge (Circa ?) and former roadway have been retained in Golden Grove Reserve. This former road bridge can be found between James Mileham Dr and Geewan Ave in the reserve. This bridge once was the extension to Acres Road joining Hezlett Road.

Kellyville now has the advantage of faster travel to Sydney CBD fuelled by the Lane Cove Tunnel and the M2 Hills Motorway. In good conditions, travel takes approximately 35 minutes.

=== Bus and rail ===
Transport to Parramatta by bus in the far-western side of Kellyville has been improved through the development of the bus-only North-West T-Way, which runs parallel with Old Windsor Road.

The Metro North West & Bankstown Line connects the Hills District to Chatswood and opened in 2019.

== Sport and recreation ==
The Bernie Mullane Sporting Complex is a major recreational facility which was officially opened in March 2003 with a total project cost of more than $13 million. As part of the project, an indoor facility for a gym and other indoor sports, tennis courts, soccer fields and cricket grounds were constructed. The complex provides for a wide range of indoor and outdoor health, recreational and sporting programs and services.

Other recreational venues include:

- Caddies Creek Reserve – Radisson Place
- Commercial Road Netball Reserve – Wellgate Avenue
- Kellyville Memorial Park – Memorial Avenue
- Macquarie Avenue Reserve – Macquarie Avenue
- The Hills Centenary Park – Cnr Commercial & Withers

Recreational facilities in close proximity include Castle Hill Country Club and Fred Caterson Reserve in Castle Hill. Fred Caterson Reserve is set within a 60 hectare bushland setting directly less than 1 km south-east of Kellyville, and offers a range of outdoor options including bushwalking tracks, BMX track, cycleways, remote control car track and many other sporting fields.

== Demographics ==
In the 2021 census, the population of Kellyville was 27,011. The median age was 38, the same as the national median. Children aged under 15 years made up 21.7% of the population (national average is 18.2%) and people aged 65 years and over made up 12.5% of the population (national average is 17.2%). 55.9% of residents were born in Australia; the next most common countries of birth were India 7.6%, China 5.7%, England 2.4%, South Africa 2.1% and Philippines 1.9%. 57.0% of residents only spoke English at home. Other languages spoken at home included Mandarin 7.6%, Hindi 3.6%, Cantonese 2.9%, Korean 2.3% and Arabic 2.2%. The most common responses for religion were Catholic 25.9%, No Religion 23.8% and Anglican 10.3%.

== Notable residents ==
Some of Kellyville's notable residents include:

- Maxine Beneba Clarke – award-winning author, poet and illustrator
- Greg Page – former member of The Wiggles
- Anthony Field – member of The Wiggles
- Waqar Younis – former Pakistan cricketer
- Ryan Papenhuyzen – NRL player

== Issues ==
=== Environmental impact ===
Kellyville, as with other newer suburbs in both the south-west and north-west districts of Sydney, has been viewed in the media as a suburb of larger homes that are low-cost in design and mediocre in terms of build quality. Most of the newer homes are built at a high house-to-land ratio, resulting in small distances between neighbours, smaller backyards, and smaller setbacks. With less land and much larger floor plans (double what a typical house would cover), environmental impact is a concern. More trees are planted to offer natural shade from extreme summer heat and more energy is needed to run air-conditioners and heaters.

=== Public transport deficiency ===
The deficiency of public transport in the area is often criticised, however now with the addition of the metro it makes it very accessible and good. Due to low density planning the bus service within many of the suburbs is slow and infrequent. As a result, commuters to the city are forced either to drive through expensive and congested tollways or take buses which are almost always overcrowded. Transportation has significantly improved after the opening of the Sydney Metro North West Line on 26 May 2019
