= Third Government Farm =

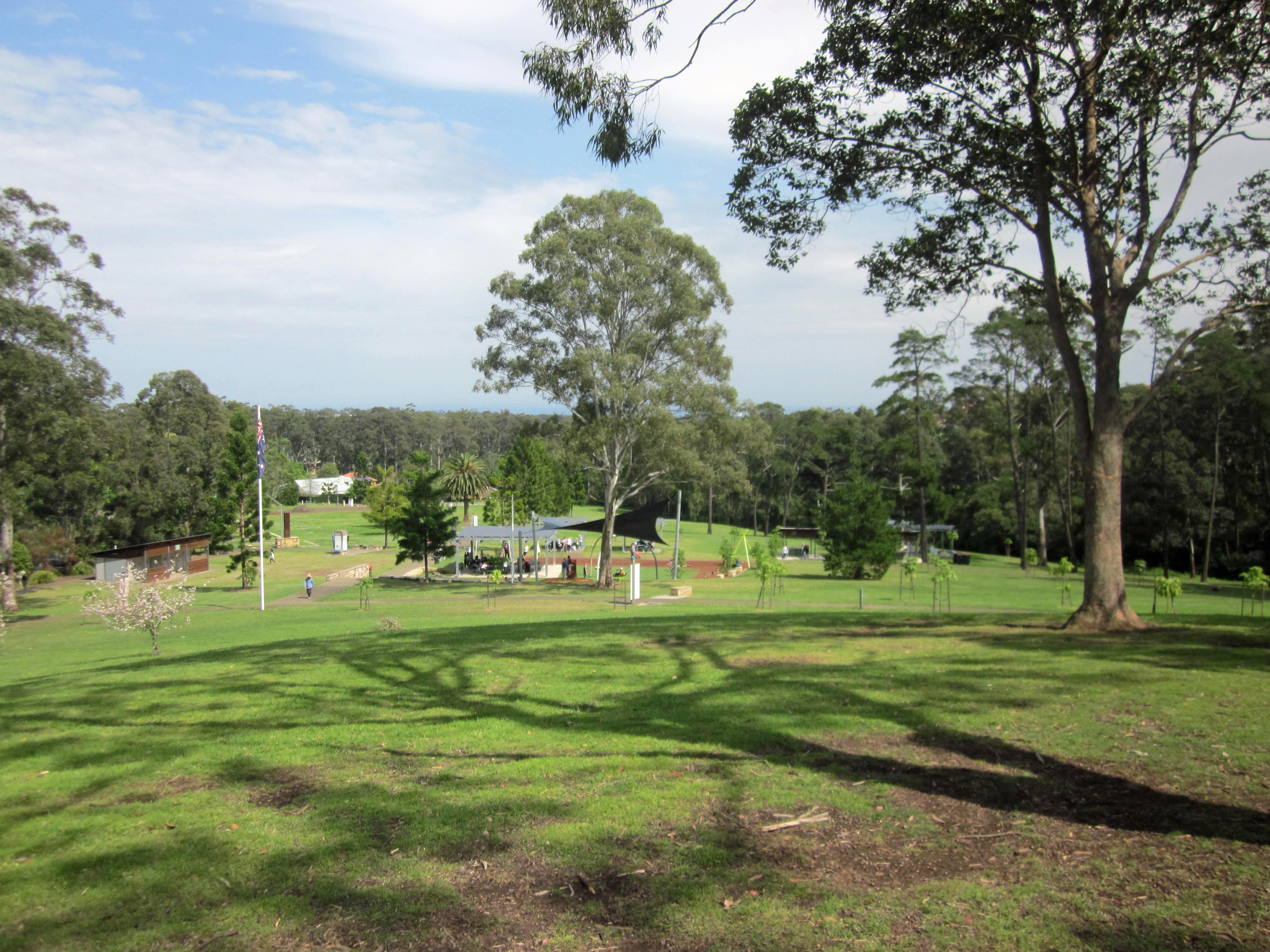
- Castle Hill Heritage Park (Third Government Farm)

- Location within Sydney Location within Australia
- 33°43′04″S 151°00′47″E
- Location: Gilbert Road, Castle Hill, The Hills Shire, New South Wales, Australia

History
- Built: 1801

Site notes
- Owner: The Hills Shire Council

New South Wales Heritage Register
- Official name: Third Government Farm (former); Castle Hill Heritage Park; Castle Hill Settlement Site; Old Government Farm Site; Castle Hill Convict Farm; Castle Hill Historic Site
- Type: State heritage (landscape)
- Designated: 22 December 2000
- Reference no.: 1448
- Type: Other – Landscape – Cultural
- Category: Landscape – Cultural

The Third Government Farm is a heritage-listed garden at Gilbert Road, near Old Northern Road, Castle Hill, The Hills Shire, New South Wales, Australia. It was built during 1801. It is also known as Castle Hill Heritage Park; Third Government Farm (former); Castle Hill Settlement Site; Old Government Farm Site; Castle Hill Convict Farm; Castle Hill Historic Site. The property is owned by The Hills Shire Council (Local Government). It was added to the New South Wales State Heritage Register on 22 December 2000.

== History ==
Castle Hill Heritage Park is significant principally for its association with the participants in the Castle Hill convict rebellion, also known as the Second Battle of Vinegar Hill.

The Second Battle of Vinegar Hill holds a seminal, but only relatively recently recognised, place in Australian ethnic, religious and political history. The Second Battle of Vinegar Hill is the only recorded armed battle between Europeans in Australia, other than the Eureka Stockade, although there were bigger battles between Europeans and indigenous Australians up until the 1930s. The Second Battle of Vinegar Hill involved approximately 300 mainly Irish insurgents, most of whom had been transported for sedition, political activism and uprisings in Ireland, and of whom fifteen were shot, nine hanged, nine flogged (200–500 lashes each), and fifty sent in chains to Coal River (later renamed Newcastle) for their part in the uprising. The insurgents battled with the soldiers of the New South Wales Corps and the militia.

The reasons for the uprising remain unclear. "Death or Liberty" was the catchphrase used by the insurgents during the Rebellion and the popular view has been that the uprising was a bid for freedom in response to cruel punishments and food shortages. This, however, is perhaps too narrow and simplistic a view given the demographics of the convict population. It is likely that the uprising was a largely political act of organised revolution by the largely Irish National convict population who did not recognise English authority in Ireland, and had been transported for their involvement in political uprisings in the Old Country. The view that to the Irish Defenders and the Society of the United Irishmen, all English authority was illegitimate, unjust and their natural state was to resist it, both at home and in the colonies, is a plausible, wider view of events.

It is still not certain why the uprising took place. There are few official and public records on this point dating to the Rebellion, due to age and circumstance and probably because of the potential embarrassment to Governor King whose policy to concentrate Irish political prisoners in a single remote location could have been seen by London and the Colonial Secretary as naive (which it almost certainly was). Those participants who were not executed as a deterrent were separated and dispersed after the Rebellion to ensure such group action was unlikely ever to again occur. Their story has never been adequately told.

It is fascinating, however, that such an important episode in Colonial history has gone largely unrecognised and un-commemorated for so long. This may relate to political and religious trends in the nineteenth and twentieth centuries.

The following important events took place on the site:

- 1801 – work commenced on the Third Government Farm, with the soil being described as the "best and most productive kind".
- 1801-2 – the bridges, long hut of 30.5 by 6.1 metres (100 by 20 ft) and watering place were referred to in a surveyors field book.
- October 1802 – Francis Peron described Castle Hill as an "infant town" consisting of "a dozen houses" with "cultivated land" and 'several handsome farms'
- 1803 – a watercolour indicated that the Government Farm area was substantially cleared with 1718 structures, tracks and associated areas under tillage. Importantly, the image shows the "long hut" with adjacent store house and mill house.
- 30 June 1803 – Governor King reported that he was constructing a stone barrack at Castle Hill of two storeys and 30.5 by 7.3 metres (100 by 24 ft).
- August 1803 – the Barracks was still under construction
- 4 March 1804 – Vinegar Hill uprising occurred, with a "house" set alight on the Government Farm.
- August 1806 – barracks building was possibly converted into barn.
- August 1807 – repairs to a number of buildings occurred, as well as the granary and barn reported finished.
- April 1811 – Macquarie instructed the farm be converted into an asylum and a garden fenced at rear of granary for exercise of inmates, with the building to accommodate 30 persons.
- June 1811 – conversion reported complete.
- 1814 – buildings reported in bad condition by Surgeon Bland.
- 1817 – buildings reported in good condition (with a few repairs needed), with mention of a kitchen (separate?) and the need for partitions in the upper storey to create an internal configuration of two wards and a store room.
- March 1819 – building reported as upstairs female ward and need for partition to separate male inmates upstairs as well, store recommended. Roof and walls unplastered with damp conditions.
- 182 – Commissioner Bigge recommended the closure of the asylum.
- 1826 – asylum closed and inmates moved to Liverpool Courthouse.
- November 1826 – the former asylum was converted into a church requiring a replacement roof, shingling, ladder and rail, replacement of floors, partitioning, door furniture, window repairs and glazing, clean verandah beams and new posts, whitewashing and plastering of two rooms 18.3 by 5.5 metres (60 by 18 ft) and one 13.7 by 5.5 metres (45 by 18 ft) feet.
- 1828 – former asylum land formally conveyed to the Church and Schools Corporation.
- 2–5 May 1832 – former asylum surveyed by Felton Mathew showing school, bridge, former asylum building and ruins (kitchen?).
- September 1832 – building reported as in dilapidated condition.
- November 1837 – H. L. Butler resurveyed the land and set aside 16 hectares (40 acres) as a glebe.
- September 1839 – building reported as being converted into a chapel to be called St Simon's.
- c. 1886 – the old asylum building was demolished, with stone reportedly transported to construct the rectory for St Paul's Anglican Church.
- 1895 – first part of the 16 hectares (40 acres) glebe sold to orchardist, J. T. Benn.
- 1900 – the remainder was sold to James Purser.
- 1930s – orcharding declined and site was given over to pasturage during later 1930s and 40s.
- Between 1947 and 1961 – a large mushroom shed was constructed to the northeast of the barracks site with a vehicular entrance to the east of the site along the right of way.
- By 1961 – a small fibro cottage with brick piers was constructed on the barracks site.
- 1966 – the dwarf wall at the rear of the cottage allotment along the right-of-way was constructed possibly of sandstone from the barracks site at the same time and in a similar fashion to the stone wall at the parsonage.

In 2004, the new-look park, 20 hectares of rolling landscaped hills and remnant Blue Gum forest, known as Castle Hill Heritage Park, was refurbished at a cost of more than $3.4 million. It was opened by the Governor of New South Wales, Professor Marie Bashir, in March 2004.

== Description ==
=== Built Heritage / Archaeology ===
There are no historic buildings on this site. However, the site contains a number of known and potential archaeological sites. Most significant of these is the site of the former barracks and associated kitchen, excavated in 2006, which survive today as sandstone wall footings.

=== Vegetation ===
The existing native vegetation on the site is all post-1816 re-growth. The date at which this process began could not be determined with accuracy. Aerial photographs demonstrate that by 1943, native timbers had regenerated along the main gully lines. The area under timber spread from the gullies, primarily in the period after 1961.

There is no evidence to indicate that any of the trees on the site pre-date European settlement. Most are likely to post-date c. 1900.

The primary element in these areas of re-growth is the Sydney blue gum (Eucalyptus saligna). This appears to be the species designated simply as "gum" in the surveys of 1803 and 1816. These surveys did, however recognise a number of other species, and these were sufficiently uncommon for them to be used as reference points in the survey. The list includes the following:

- 'Blackbutt' (Eucalyptus pilularis)
- 'Apple' (probably Angophora floribunda)
- 'Oak' (Allocasuarina torulosa)
- 'Ironbark' (Eucalyptus fibrosa)
- 'Bloodwood' (Corymbia eximia)

Of these species, Angophora floribunda has been recognised in the gully immediately north of Banks Road. It is unclear if other species on the list are currently present.

=== Government Farm Phase ===
The heavily timbered pre-European landscape was modified during the initial phase of development of the site as a Government farm by a process of clear-felling and burning. The process commenced on the site and radiated from this core area as more land was required for grazing stock and for raising crops.

All trees and scrub on the site, except for a single stand of trees located to the east of the barracks, were removed. The forest was also left intact beyond the line of the ridge to the north and northeast of the site.

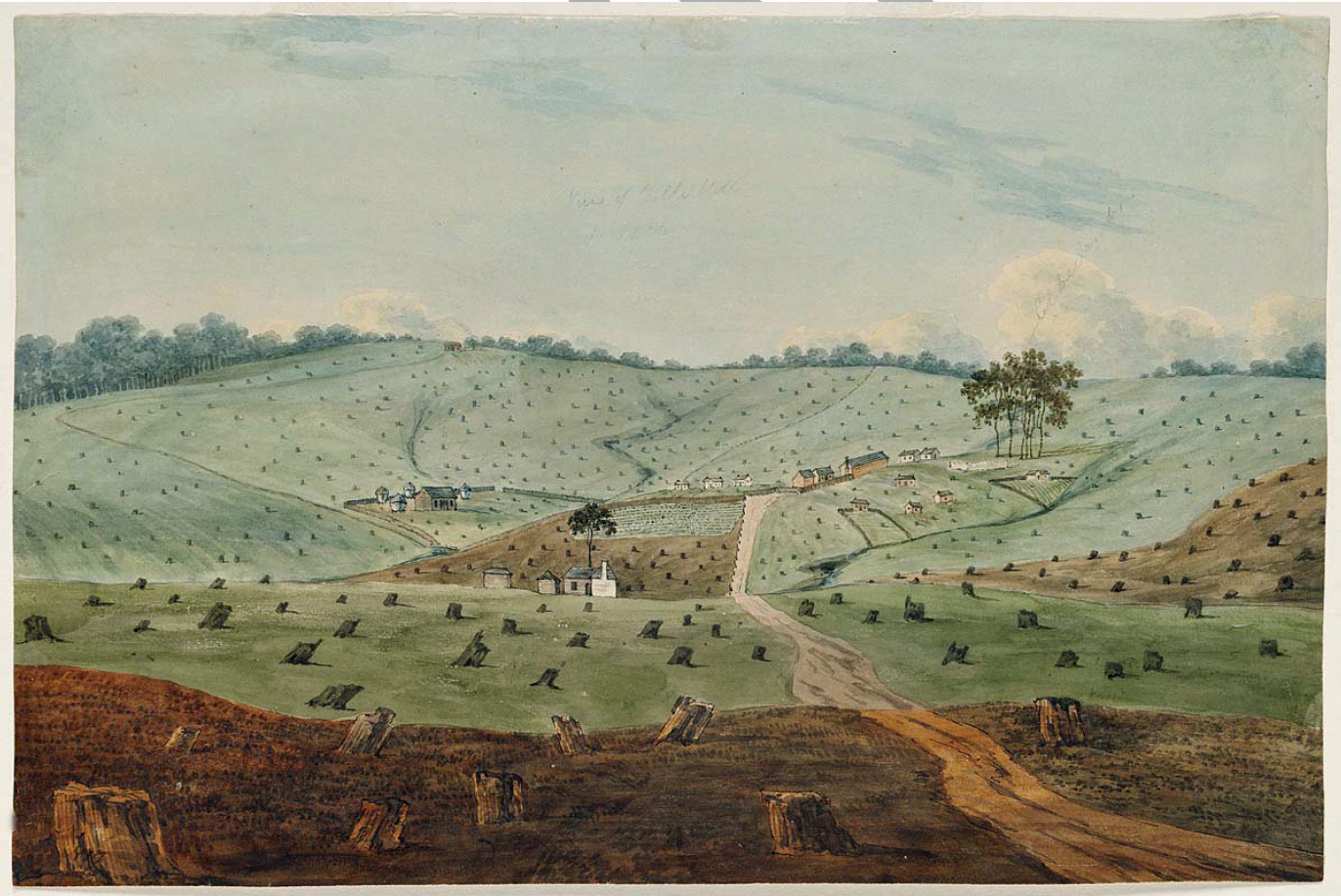
View of Castle Hill Government Farm, c.1806—an unsigned watercolour attributed to John Lewin, painted from near to where Banks Road now is.

The areas thus opened up within the site were used primarily for running stock; however, there were a number of distinct zones.

- A low ridge located on the southern margin of the site was occupied by the principal buildings.
- The flat area located immediately north of Banks Road (site of the bell) may have been used as an assembly/ muster point during the normal operation of the site and during the uprising in 1804.
- A barnyard on the western side of the creek.
- The superintendent's garden.

=== Asylum and Church Phases ===
Two main zones were present during these phases

- The yard and garden associated with the asylum surgeon's residence / later school yard and
- The area occupied by the main asylum buildings/later church.

The remaining areas of the site appear to have been unused or given over to stock grazing.

=== Orcharding Phase ===
During the later orcharding phase most of the southwest corner of the site was put to use for fruit growing. Most of the landscape modification during the orcharding period was undertaken in the post-1900 period and is related to changes in the agricultural use of the site and subdivision.

The most significant landscape element of the Orcharding Phase that remains clearly visible on the site today is the remains of the quarter-mile long dog racing course on the western boundary of the site. In addition, a domed brick cistern, associated with a mid-twentieth century domestic occupation, remains in the northeast quadrant of the park. The remaining areas of the site were used for grazing with regrowth of native timbers being allowed to take place in the gullies.

=== Topography and Waterways ===
The site is characterised by four main topographic zones

- The upper ridge slopes in the north and east;
- The lower moderate slopes with a grade of <1:10;
- The flat adjacent to Banks Road; and
- The central gully/creek line containing areas of outcropping sandstone.

These have remained largely unchanged since European settlement apart from the sculpting of part of the upper ridge slope south of Gilbert Road for the installation of a dam and the reworking of the western margin of the site for a dog course. The 1960s saw substantial landform modification to level an area for the installation of chicken sheds adjacent to the convict barracks site. This modification removed the northern two-thirds of the barracks remains.

The small flat enclosed by a ridge with moderate foot slopes, and a series of creeks and gullies and reasonably fertile soils, may have contributed to the original selection of this place for a Government Farm, and the small chain of ponds shown in the 1803 watercolour may have been the original water source for the inhabitants of the Farm. These elements in their current configuration are important elements in understanding the reasons for the original establishment of the farm. The enclosing ridge lined with forest during the early phase of the Government Farm marked the limit of expansion of European settlement as well as providing a psychological barrier confining those sent to work here. The ridge to the north and east that provides such an important backdrop to the site throughout its various phases of development is the "Castle Hill", from which the wider suburb derives its name.

=== Condition ===
No buildings remain, foundations may remain below present ground level.

== Heritage listing ==
As at 27 October 2008, Castle Hill Heritage Park is important in the course or pattern of the state's history for its close connection with the events leading up to the Battle of Vinegar Hill in 1804 (also comprising an important event in the Irish nationalist movements of the eighteenth and nineteenth centuries). The historical importance of the site is enhanced by its place in the westward expansion of the early colony, using convict labour, when sometimes faltering and often unsuccessful attempts were made at the introduction and development of agriculture in previously unsettled and only recently explored areas. Later uses of the site as the nation's first dedicated mental health facility (the 'Asylum Phase') (1811–1828) enhances the site's historical significance. The site's conversion to use for a church and school (1828–1866) and then adaptation for orcharding (1870–1930) are also important historical "layers", principally at the local level.

Castle Hill Heritage Park is Exceptionally significant at the state level for its strong associations with the rebels who participated in the Battle of Vinegar Hill in 1804 and, more generally, with the early convict labourers and Irish of the colony. The site's later associations with the first mental health patients of the nation, and with the prominent colonial polymath Rev WB Clarke, are also significant at the state level. Associations between the site and the local community from 1828 into the late twentieth century (when it functioned as the district Church and then orchards) are also significant, although principally at the local level.

Castle Hill Heritage Park recalls in its topography, land forms and remnant structures the original layout and form of the Third Government Farm. As a result, it reflects the nineteenth century cultural landscape and demonstrates, at a state level of significance, the principal characteristics of the rural aesthetic of the period.

The orcharding phase of the site may be of social significance to those members of the community that are descendants of the earlier orchardists of the area. Further, the school and church were for many years focal points for the community after the closure of the barracks and asylum.

The archaeological relics identified at Castle Hill, and other relics potentially on the site but not yet exposed, hold considerable potential to contribute to substantive research questions relating to important trends in the state's (and nation's) history, including the treatment of the convicts and mental health patients incarcerated at the site, the circumstances precipitating the Battle of Vinegar Hill, early attempts at agriculture west of Sydney, and (at the local level) the settlement and later development of the area around Castle Hill.

The site represents an uncommon aspect of the state's (and nation's) history, in that it is one of only two places in the country where armed rebellion was planned and commenced. Similarly, it was the first Lunatic Asylum in the colony, and rare to that extent, although later examples also existed. The cultural landscape at the site also comprises an uncommon example of a relatively unchanged (in terms of topography and later development) convict farm site.

Castle Hill Heritage Park is important at the State level as a representative example of a relatively unchanged (in terms of topography and later development) convict farm site. Its remnant cultural landscape is a good example of the nineteenth century convict farm settlement.

The Third Government Farm was listed on the New South Wales State Heritage Register on 22 December 2000.

== See also ==
- History of Sydney
- Castle Hill convict rebellion
