= Rouse Hill House =

Historic building in Sydney, Australia

Rouse Hill Estate
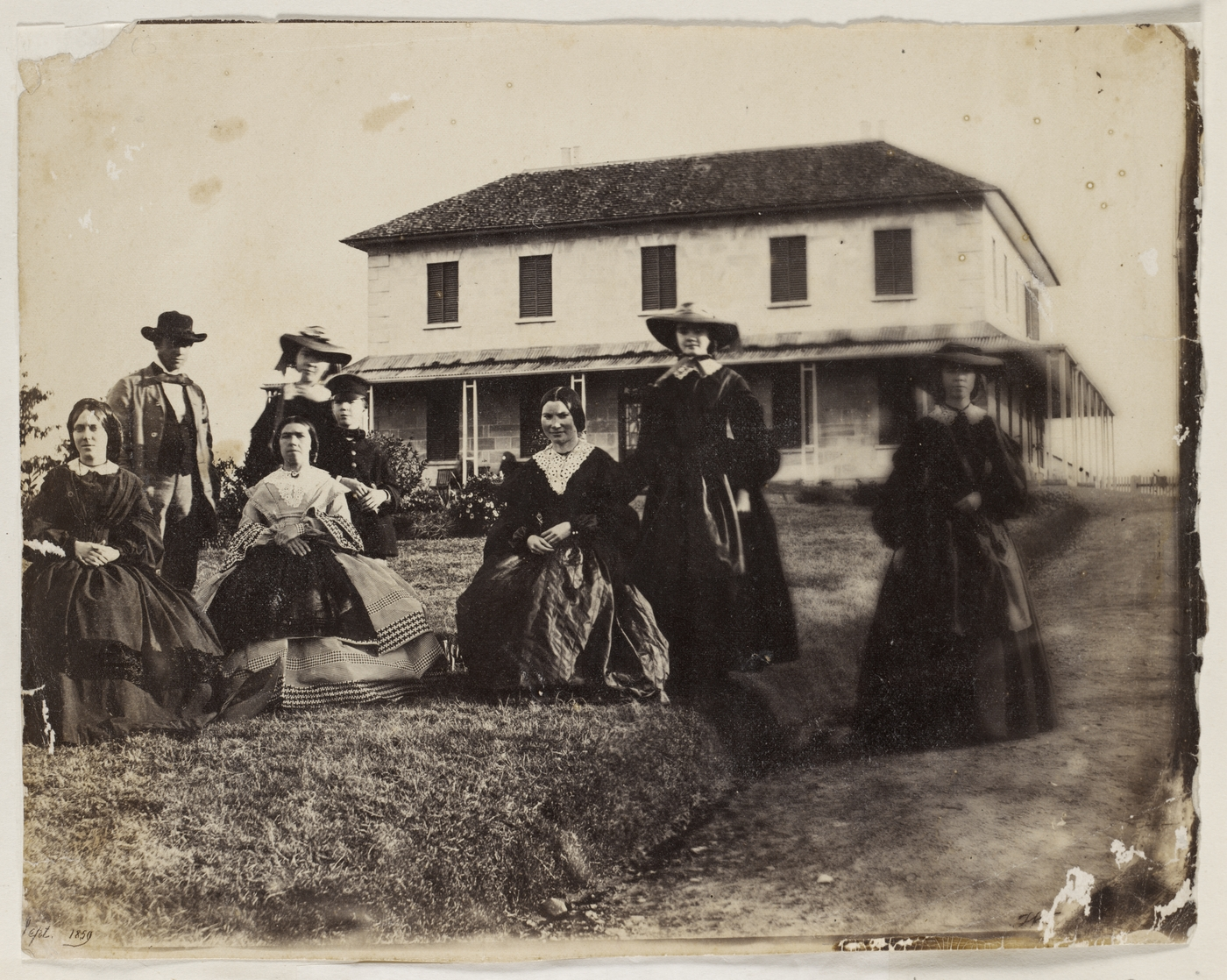
- The Rouse family in front of Rouse Hill Estate, 1859

- Location within Sydney

General information
- Status: House museum, public park
- Type: Homestead complex
- Architectural style: Australian Georgian
- Location: 356 Annangrove Road, Rouse Hill, New South Wales, Sydney, Australia
- Coordinates: 33°40′33″S 150°54′27″E
- Construction started: 1813
- Completed: 1819
- Client: Richard Rouse, Superintendent of Public Works and Convicts at Parramatta
- Owner: Museums of History NSW
- Landlord: Office of Environment and Heritage, Government of New South Wales

Design and construction
- Architects: Richard Rouse (attributed); John Horbury Hunt (stables)

Website
- sydneylivingmuseums.com.au/rouse-hill-house-farm

New South Wales Heritage Register
- Official name: Rouse Hill House and Farm
- Type: Landscape
- Criteria: a., c., d., e., f., g.
- Designated: 2 April 1999
- Reference no.: 00002

Rouse Hill Estate is a heritage-listed homestead and estate off Windsor Road (356 Annangrove Road), Rouse Hill, City of Blacktown, New South Wales, Australia. Rouse Hill House and farm was the family home of Richard Rouse, the Colonial Superintendent of Public Works and Convicts at Parramatta.

The homestead, in the Australian Georgian style, was developed between 1813 and 1819 with further developments in c. 1863. The homestead is managed by Museums of History New South Wales as a museum that is open to the public. Much of the former grounds have been transformed into Rouse Hill Regional Park and subsequent residential and commercial developments. It was added to the New South Wales State Heritage Register on 2 April 1999.

== History ==
=== Rouse family ===
Richard Rouse (1774–1852) appears to have begun building at Rouse Hill in 1813 although the grant of 180 hectares (450 acres) was not made until October 1816. Sometime between 1818 and 1825, Rouse, his wife Elizabeth (1772–1849) and family moved from Parramatta to the new house. The son of an Oxfordshire cabinet maker and shop-keeper, Rouse came to the colony, free, in 1801. Prospering quickly, by 1805 he was Superintendent of Public Works and Convicts at Parramatta.

In this role he supervised the building of Governor Lachlan Macquarie and his wife's additions to Old Government House, Parramatta, in the mid 1810s. It is possible that these works influenced Rouse to build a bigger house than he first intended, adding larger, longer rooms behind the front range.

He chose the site of his new house while building toll houses for Macquarie's upgraded road to the Hawkesbury River. Rouse sited the new house prominently, possibly with an eye to its possible use as an inn, on a hilltop adjacent to the toll house (also built by him) on the Parramatta to Windsor Turnpike. He acquired other properties, more fertile than the Rouse Hill farm, but Rouse Hill had the advantage of strategic siting. While other early colonial homesteads overlooked their crops or pastures, Rouse Hill has always overlooked the busy Windsor Road. It was from here that Rouse and his descendants oversaw their distant pastoral and agricultural interests, rather than the estate itself being the focus of those interests.

Rouse was not bred to the land, but was shrewd and capable, careful of money and acquisitive of property. He left, on his death in 1852, extensive holdings throughout the colony. The Rouse Hill estate grew to 490 hectares (1,200 acres) by Rouse's death, by purchase of an adjacent grant. Rouse consolidated his land holdings at North Richmond from around 1806 and increased his pastoral holdings in the north west of New South Wales, using his sons to colonise further west while he continued to acquire land in Parramatta and Western Sydney.

A number of the property's outbuildings finished construction following the completion of the house, including the laundry wing, cottage, barn and woolshed. The garden layout reflects the construction of the house between 1813 and 1818. Some trees remain from the plantings in the mid 19th century. With the exception of outbuildings, Rouse seems to have made no other alterations to the property's buildings. This was left to later generations. Rouse died in 1852 leaving the property to his son Edwin Rouse. The property went to Edwin's son Edwin Stephen Rouse on his death in 1862.

A summerhouse, woolshed and a two-storey service wing was added in the 1860s, the stables built in 1876 and 1877 and the house redecorated and partly furnished in 1885. The service wing made no direct connection with the house. A verandah, weighted sash windows, a modified front door and sidelights and other late 19th century innovations were also installed. These too have been done in such a way as to preserve the integrity of the house.

Rouse Hill Public School opened to the east of Rouse Hill Estate in 1888.

Edwin Stephen Rouse's eldest daughter Nina, who had left the house in 1895 to marry George Terry, returned with her husband to live at Rouse Hill in 1924. This was a result of their bankruptcy. Following the death of Edwin Stephen Rouse in 1931 his estate was administered by Trustees, mainly family members and later a family company, until 1969. In 1932 the studio was converted into a breakfast room. Estate subdivision had begun in 1951 and the property had been reduced to 43 hectares (106 acres) by 1963. Nina Terry died at Rouse Hill House in 1968 and the following year the remaining 43 hectares (106 acres) were subdivided. The homestead block of 12 hectares (29 acres) went to her two sons Gerald and Roderick Terry as tenants in common.

When a family dispute occurred following the death of Edwin Rouse's granddaughter Nina Terry in 1968, architect John Fisher (early member of the Institute of Architects, member of the Cumberland County Historic Buildings Committee and National Trust of Australia (NSW) Board member after its reformation in 1960) chaired the Rouse Hill Preservation Committee, which brought together the family and representatives of the National Trust of Australia (NSW). This led to the NSW Government resuming the property, which later became a property under the care of the Historic Houses Trust of New South Wales (HHT).

A further subdivision in 1974 reduced the homestead block to 8.15 hectares (20.1 acres).

=== State government ownership ===
In March 1978 the NSW government purchased the property which also contained 24 outbuildings (and half its contents). It was administered by the Planning and Environment Commission, later the Department of Planning, which commissioned restoration works from the Public Works Department.

The Heritage Council's Restoration Steering (HC RS) Committee resolved to have a conservation statement prepared for the buildings and their site. Urgent repair works to the outbuildings were identified and undertaken under the supervision of the Government Architect's Branch, Public Works Department and the main entrance driveway was regraded and regravelled. Urgent repair and stabilisation on the homestead and outbuildings continued and a fire control service was installed in the garden. A gardener was contracted to carry out urgent garden maintenance. The HC RS Committee considered the need for accurate documentation of interior finishes and contents of the buildings and for curatorial and materials conservation work to be carried out. The initial conservation programme was endorsed and circulated to various interested conservation bodies for comment. The Royal Australian Historical Society was requested to undertake an historical research programme on the property. An archaeologist was contracted to be present during any excavation works associated with the repairs programme.

There has been a continuity of family ownership at Rouse Hill until 1978. Particular forces in the family's history and those of wealth in the 19th century, followed by financial hardship, longevity and resistance to change in the 20th century have left the property in a poignantly fragile condition. This fragility is inherent in much of the property's historic fabric and is integral to the archival significance of the place.

=== Historic Houses Trust ===
In 1984 the summer house was repaired/reconstructed, and the property was transferred to the Historic Houses Trust in 1987. Family association with the property continued through the occupancy of Gerald Terry from 1968, Roderick Terry, 1968–80, and the latter's daughter and son in law, Miriam and Ian Hamilton and the Hamiltons' ownership of a significant portion of the collection. The collection was subsequently transferred to the Hamilton Rouse Hill Trust.

Since 1978 descendants have returned many significant family items and the collection now comprises over 20,000 objects as diverse as costume, furniture, tools and automobiles.

By 1993, there were 25 acres (10 hectares) of land left, in the management of the Historic Houses Trust.

When the HHT opened Rouse Hill Estate to the public in 1999 it was in a limited capacity and a very different context. In 2007, anticipating the extraordinary residential growth in the area, the HHT sought funding of $19m from Treasury to provide new visitor and cultural facilities (interpretation, programs, research and access to the collection) along with commercial activities (cafe, retail, auditorium and flexible public spaces to be used as venues). The project aimed to improve the property's sustainability and allowed it to be opened up to thousands of visitors a year.

The property received an Energy Australia National Trust Heritage Award in 2004.

In 2008, HHT got first stage funding for the education component of its vision for the site. To protect the heritage precinct the State Government established the Rouse Hill Regional Park, transferred the 1888 Rouse Hill Public School (former) and adjacent lands to the HHT and diverted the upgraded Windsor Road (to the east away from the house and school). Advocacy by the Friends of the Historic Houses Trust was in large part responsible for moving the road to create this bypass, protecting the site's setting from encroachment.

On 10 March 2009, remnant Roads & Traffic Authority (RTA) lands were transferred to the HHT (from the Windsor Road bypass which is open further to the east than the old road alignment (in a cutting). The Hills Shire Council approved stage one development application for works.

In 2009–10, the construction program was almost complete on former RTA land and Rouse Hill Public School (former) adjoining re-aligned Windsor Road. The school house was conserved, repainted in Victorian colour scheme and interpreted as 19th century school; cafe, retail, education centre and outdoor auditorium (for 60); parking; security; flexible public spaces to be used as venues and landscaping works completed. The property's capacity and visitation rate increased, including increasing numbers of local schools (capacity now for 20,000 children a year to visit).

Transfer of the remnant RTA lands created a new opportunity for research and interpretation. HHT historians Joy Hughes, Jane Kelson and curator Fergus Clunie began gathering historic maps of the region. Searching for the location of the original Toll House at Rouse Hill, he unearthed new evidence about the line of the old Hawkesbury Road (1794–1813) on which the pursuit and "battle of Vinegar Hill", an armed conflagration between convicts and troops, took place in 1804. Although the road has long since disappeared, it defined the boundary of the first land grant in the area, the 1000 acre "Copenhagen" given to Captain William Bligh. It also ran close to the surviving kilometre stretch of the old Windsor Road built by convicts in 1812–13 as the first turnpike in the colony between Sydney and the Hawkesbury. The exact location of the battle of Vinegar Hill has long been debated, but the map evidence and line of the old Hawkesbury Road indicate that it most likely took place between Second Ponds Creek and the crest of Rouse Hill, formerly known as Vinegar Hill. A line of very early trees at the edge of the road is believed to date back to the time of the battle.

Rouse Hill House, dating from 1813, is one of Australia's longest continuously occupied houses and is situated within what is considered Australia's oldest surviving garden. The property retains its original outbuildings, interiors and collections. Its possible association with the Battle of Vinegar Hill adds further historical significance and presents opportunities for interpretation, prompting the Historic Houses Trust (HHT) to reconsider its approach to the property.

By June 2016, increased visitation had been achieved by introducing a series of limited-number tours of the house's interiors. Works to conserve the farm's dairy precinct had been completed. Two main posts whose subsoil bases had decayed were re-footed, with new spliced material and a pad footing. Guttering was replaced, along with some roof sheeting where discrete patching was no longer sufficient and decayed timber trimming on the milk house has been replaced

The bathhouse was conserved and repaired in September 2017.

=== Modifications and dates ===
Since its establishment in 1813, when the house was begun on the 180-hectare (450-acre) property, the following modifications have occurred:

- 1818 – house completed
- c. 1820 – cottage built
- 1825 – family took up residence
- c. 1825 – stage 1 of garden laid out with oval carriage loop and squared Georgian fashion to northeast of house, all borders to paths thought to be "dug", brick and stone borders and gutters added later, Moreton Bay figs northeast of house must date to this period (Ficus macrophylla)
- 1840s – Barn, woolshed and laundry wing built
- 1855 – Verandahs added to house and summerhouse and slaughter house built
- 1860s – Two storey service wing
- 1862 – Roof of house slated
- c. 1865 – garden modification – stage 2 garden bridges over gutter northeast of squared beds east of house, drain added also in this location, garden beds (diamond and 4 triangles) cut in front of house, paling fence added to southeast, picket fence or gate to southwest near house, entrance driveway formalised, more fencing
- 1865–67 – Two storey service wing added
- 1876–77 – Stables built
- 1885 – House decorated and partially refurnished
- c. 1885 – stage 3 garden modifications, sandstone drain and bridges to northeast of squared garden east of house, kitchen garden and drying yard added to southeast of house, paving in between western wings of house, circular drive loop west of house, 2 picket gates northwest side of house, trellis frame on northern wall of northern rear wing west of house, shed and octagonal summer house added in garden east of house, new garden bed immediately adjacent to east wall of house (near front facade but to the side), arbours/trellis added on two crossing garden paths east of house
- 1888 – Rouse Hill public school opened to the east of Rouse Hill House and farm
- 1932 – Studio converted into a breakfast room
- 1951–63 – Subdivision. Land reduced to 43 hectares (106 acres)
- 1957 – Bathhouse renovated
- 1961 – Demolition of glass enclosure to western verandah
- 1965 – Nursery floor replaced
- c. 1968 – stage 4 garden modifications - driveway re-routed WWII, two rear (west of house) gates added, steel tank added west of house, rockery added southwest of house, two gates added east of house connecting to pre-existing paths, vehicle gate and path added further east of garden towards Windsor Road, garden east of house used as grazing paddock, embankment cut into Windsor Road (with road upgrading?), loss of arbours/trellis on one of two garden paths (of c. 1885 creation), stone kerbing on 3 garden paths (north-south) east of house replace? Earlier brick borders.
- 1968 – Further subdivision
- 1974 – Final subdivision
- 1984 – summer house repair/reconstructed
- 1993 – 10 hectares (25 acres) of land left (in HHT management)
- 2008 – HHT got first stage funding for education component of its vision for the site.
- 10 March 2009 – Remnant RTA lands were transferred to the HHT (from the Windsor Road bypass which is open further to the east than the old road alignment (in a cutting). The Hills Shire Council approved stage one development application for works
- 2009–10 – Construction program almost complete on former RTA land and Rouse Hill Public School (former) adjoining re-aligned Windsor Road: School house conserved, repainted in Victorian colour scheme and interpreted as 19th century school; cafe, retail, education centre and outdoor auditorium (for 60); parking; security; flexible public spaces to be used as venues and landscaping works completed. Property's capacity and visitation rate increased, including increasing numbers of local schools (capacity now for 20,000 children a year to visit)
- June 2016 – increased visitation has been achieved by introducing a series of limited-number tours of the house's interiors. Works to conserve the farm's dairy precinct are now complete. Two main posts whose subsoil bases had decayed were re-footed, with new spliced material and a pad footing. Guttering was replaced, along with some roof sheeting where discrete patching was no longer sufficient and decayed timber trimming on the milk house has been replaced

== Description ==
Rouse Hill Estate is arguably unrivalled in Australia for the wealth of physical evidence of its own history and its use by the family which built it. This intactness extends to all aspects of the property.

The property is perhaps unique for its survival as a largely intact estate with an unbroken chain of occupancy, allowing the survival of major garden and interior elements of every period of its history to the present. This layering of artefacts and fashions is especially prevalent in the gardens where designs and physical details such as edging, fencing, planting containers, bed designs and paths provide a case history for the study of the development of garden practices in Australia.

The physical condition of the property was reported as being good as at 18 September 1997.

=== House ===
Rouse Hill house is a large two storey Georgian house set on top of a ridge which falls away gradually to all cardinal points. The house is oriented to the northeast, midway between Parramatta & Windsor. The house has a separate two storey brick service wing, offices forming an arcaded courtyard, 22 rooms, staircase hall, service stair and two cellar rooms. The house has a fine stone-flagged stair hall with cantilevered timber stair. The doors are all six panelled with some architraves and panelled jamb linings. The main house is built of sandstone with a slate roof, timber floors (kitchen, scullery, staircase, hall, arcade and verandah are flagged) and oakgrained hardwood joinery.

=== Garden ===
The garden is perhaps Australia's oldest surviving colonial garden in relatively intact form. The surviving physical evidence in the gardens includes borders in a variety of materials, fence and gate remnants, fragments of trellis and arbours, paving and numerous soil displacements that become evident with the location's annual dry spells. These physical remains, matched with pictorial evidence from photographs, drawings and engravings of the property, and writings, have resulted in the identification of four stages of the garden's development: c. 1825, c. 1865, c. 1885 and c. 1968.

This continuity and evidence of evolution of a very early intact garden from the first quarter of the 19th century to the Edwardian era and 20th century is extremely rare in Australia. The effects of new technologies in Australian estate gardening with replacement of palings with wire fences, displacement of stone and brick garden or path edgings with terracotta tile edgings, etc. are quite evident.

Dominating the garden and seen from afar are tall, mature Araucaria pines (bunya pine, A. bidwillii and hoop pine, A. cunninghamii).

=== Bath House (1858) ===
Picturesque building in the garden thought to have been built by Scottish-born Parramatta builder and architect, James Houison, it originally featured ine arched timber trellises on the two verandahs and porches on each side. This treillage supported climbing plants and gave some privacy to users of the bathroom and lavatory. Morewood & Rogers roofing (tin) tiles, stone flagging. Restored in 2017.

=== Dairy ===
The dairy design is essentially the same as one for a model dairy promoted in 1947 by the NSW Department of Agriculture as suitable for smaller farmers. "Model dairies" (a term dating to the 1800s) were structures that exemplified the most up-to-date hygiene and production principles and materials, and could serve as a model to other farmers to copy. The Rouse dairy contains a linear row of bails, with a gabled, fibre-cement-clad "milk house" at the western end that held the pumping machinery and generator. As per 1947 plan specifications, the floor was laid with easily washed concrete to maintain strict hygiene. A much earlier timber structure, containing two cow bails for hand-milking, also survives at Rouse Hill House and features in tours of its outbuildings.

=== Outbuildings ===
Other buildings on the site include a slab built cow shed, brick bath house, a reconstructed timber summer house, brick stables. The property also has an extant caretaker's house.

== Heritage listing ==
Rouse Hill Estate is one of the most significant and substantial houses of the Macquarie period which dates from 1810 to 1822. Rouse Hill Estate is the largest and most complete publicly owned physical record - in the form of buildings, furnishings, artefacts and landscape relationship - of the occupancy and culture of a European-Australian family, encompassing the tastes, fortunes, and endeavours of seven generations from the early 19th century to the late 20th century.

The property is perhaps unique for its survival as a largely intact estate with an unbroken chain of occupancy, allowing the survival of major garden and interior elements of every period of its history to the present. This layering of artefacts and fashions is especially prevalent in the gardens where designs and physical details such as edging, fencing, planting containers, bed designs and paths provide a case history for the study of the development of garden practices in Australia.

The garden is perhaps Australia's oldest surviving colonial garden in relatively intact form. The surviving physical evidence in the gardens includes borders in a variety of materials, fence and gate remnants, fragments of trellis and arbours, paving and numerous soil displacements that become evident with the location's annual dry spells. These physical remains, matched with pictorial evidence from photographs, drawings and engravings of the property, and writings, have resulted in the identification of four stages of the garden's development: c.1825, c.1865, c.1885 and c.1968. This continuity and evidence of evolution of a very early intact garden from the first quarter of the 19th century to the Edwardian era and 20th century is extremely rare in Australia.

Rouse Hill Estate was listed on the New South Wales State Heritage Register on 2 April 1999 having satisfied the following criteria.

The place is important in demonstrating the course, or pattern, of cultural or natural history in New South Wales.

Rouse Hill Estate is significant for the record of the Rouse and Terry family occupancy over the seven generations and 180 years which the property constitutes. This record is to be found physically in the house, its outbuildings, finishes, collection, garden and rural curtilage.

The property is significant for:

- Its association with Richard Rouse, building contractor and free settler, and Superintendent of Public Works, based at Parramatta.
- Its association with the convict period through assignment of convicts for the building of the house and operation of Rouse Hill Estate and nearby properties.
- As a record of the history of taste and level of cultural awareness held by a particular class of people in the history of New South Wales.

The property provides evidence of recurrent themes in NSW history, for example, the family's prosperity throughout the 19th century followed by relative poverty in the 20th century is representative of "Boom and Bust" themes in Australian social and economic history.

Of local significance is its association with a local population which included men and women who worked on the Rouse Hill property, shop keepers, local clergy, school masters and their families.

The place is important in demonstrating aesthetic characteristics and/or a high degree of creative or technical achievement in New South Wales.

Rouse Hill Estate is a record of the aesthetic tastes of seven generations of a single family.

The aesthetic responses to the place depend on the diversity of the visual evidence - in the building, range of decorative and applied arts, garden and the agricultural surrounds, and their interconnectedness.

The place has strong or special association with a particular community or cultural group in New South Wales for social, cultural or spiritual reasons.

The family history is representative of a class of people who survived the 1840s depression to rise to social prominence in the second half of the 19th century. It encompasses:

- the family's role as landowners with significant commercial interests in Parramatta
- the family's pre c. 1910 commercial and social prominence as pastoralists
- the social make-up of the extended family which included, free settlers, emancipists, pastoralists, businessmen, merchants and military, political and engineering men.

The place has potential to yield information that will contribute to an understanding of the cultural or natural history of New South Wales.

The property is significant for:

- The evidence that the wide range of building works, including agricultural works, provides of various forms of design and construction from 1812 to the present
- The wide range of services and domestic equipment at the place dating from 1812 to the present.
- the immense research potential of the continuum of building techniques, services and equipment on the site and for the one family.

The place possesses uncommon, rare or endangered aspects of the cultural or natural history of New South Wales.

The garden is important for its layout rather than its plants. It is perhaps the earliest garden design to have survived in NSW, almost unaltered in form although modified slightly in detail.

The place is important in demonstrating the principal characteristics of a class of cultural or natural places/environments in New South Wales.

The historical relationship of Rouse Hill to other properties owned by the Rouse family is representative of historical patterns of settlement in NSW in which first generation properties on the Cumberland Plain were supplemented or eclipsed.
