= Hills Centre =

Complex of buildings in Sydney, Australia

The Hills Centre was a modern brutalist complex of civic buildings in Castle Hill, Sydney, New South Wales, Australia and opened in stages between 1982 and 1988, and was demolished in 2013.

The complex included a 1,678-seat auditorium known as the 'Hills Entertainment Centre' or 'The Hills Centre for the Performing Arts', a council works depot and the Baulkham Hills Shire Council (later The Hills Shire Council) chambers. The auditorium played host to early meetings of Hillsong Church before the group moved to a purpose-built facility nearby.

The Entertainment Centre foyer was dominated by a large mural: a Cubism-inspired work depicting various aspects of the performing arts, made up of thousands of ceramic pieces. The mural was the work of local artist Vladimir Tichy, who maintained a studio on the premises of the Norbrik Brickworks, formerly on Old Windsor Road, Baulkham Hills.

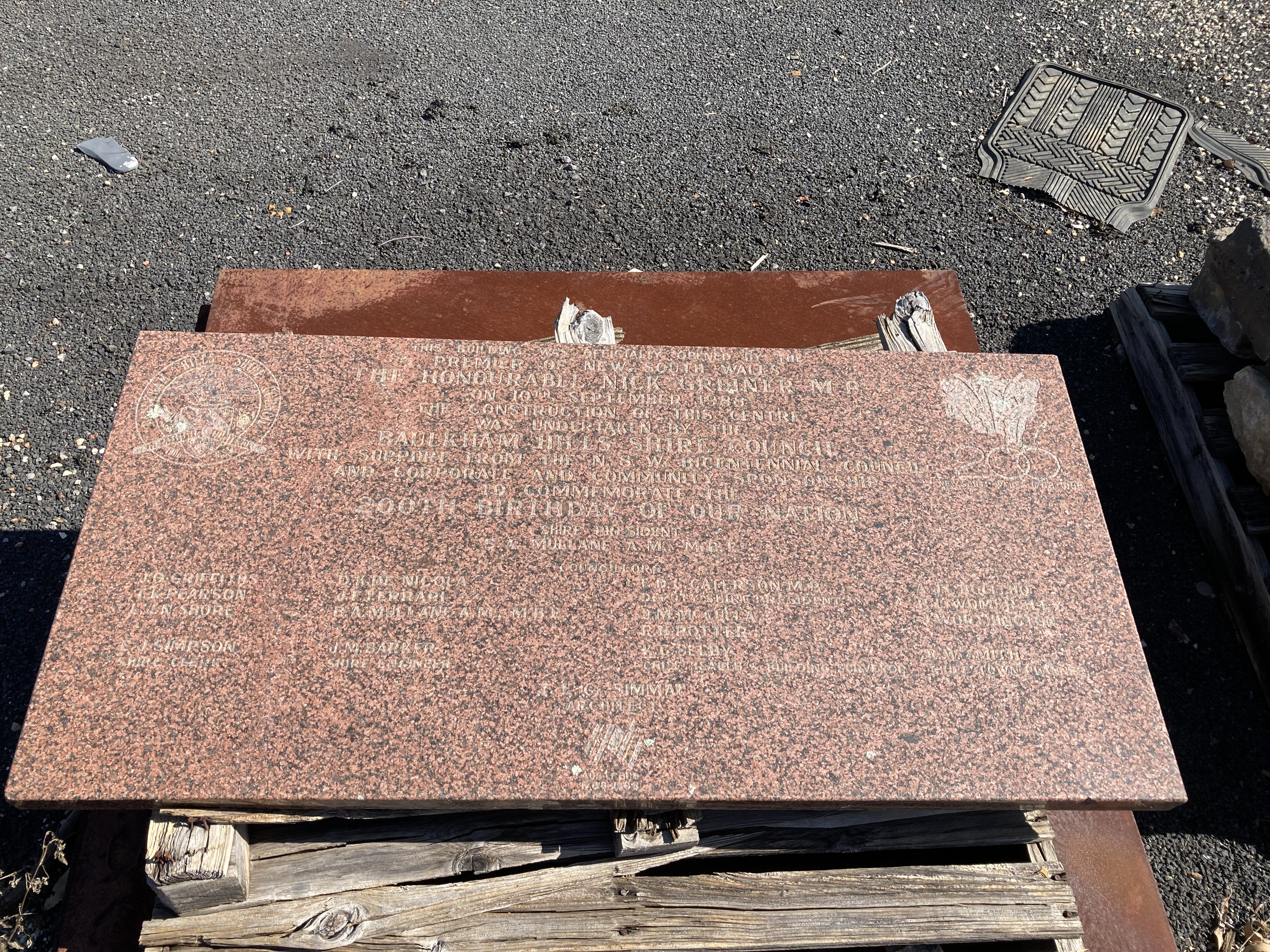
The plaque from the former Hills Centre for the Performing Arts in Baulkham Hills.

During the development of the site, pavers were purchased by community members; these pavers had the names of individuals and families on them and were placed in the grounds of the Entertainment Centre for "posterity". It is not known if the pavers had been saved or relocated following demolition.

== North West Rail Link proposal ==
In the 2000s, "Hills Centre" appeared on maps as a possible station for future railway lines, including the North West Rail Link (NWRL) and North West Metro. The station would have been on the site of the Castle Hill Showground, which would have faced demolition as a result.

After the New South Wales Government determined to proceed with the NWRL in 2011, community feedback led to the station being shifted from the showground site, which had heritage significance, to the Hills Centre site opposite. The station was renamed Hills Showground as a result.

Despite some local opposition to the change – the Hills Centre was of particular significance to a generation of school students who had performed there over the years – the site was compulsorily acquired by Transport for NSW in 2013. The buildings were demolished soon after.

The Council moved to new offices in nearby Baulkham Hills in late 2013. School performances shifted to the Hillsong Centre, Parramatta Riverside Theatres and other venues.

The station opened as part of Sydney Metro Northwest in May 2019.
