= Castle Hill convict rebellion =

1804 Australian revolt in New South Wales

- Part of the British colonisation of Australia
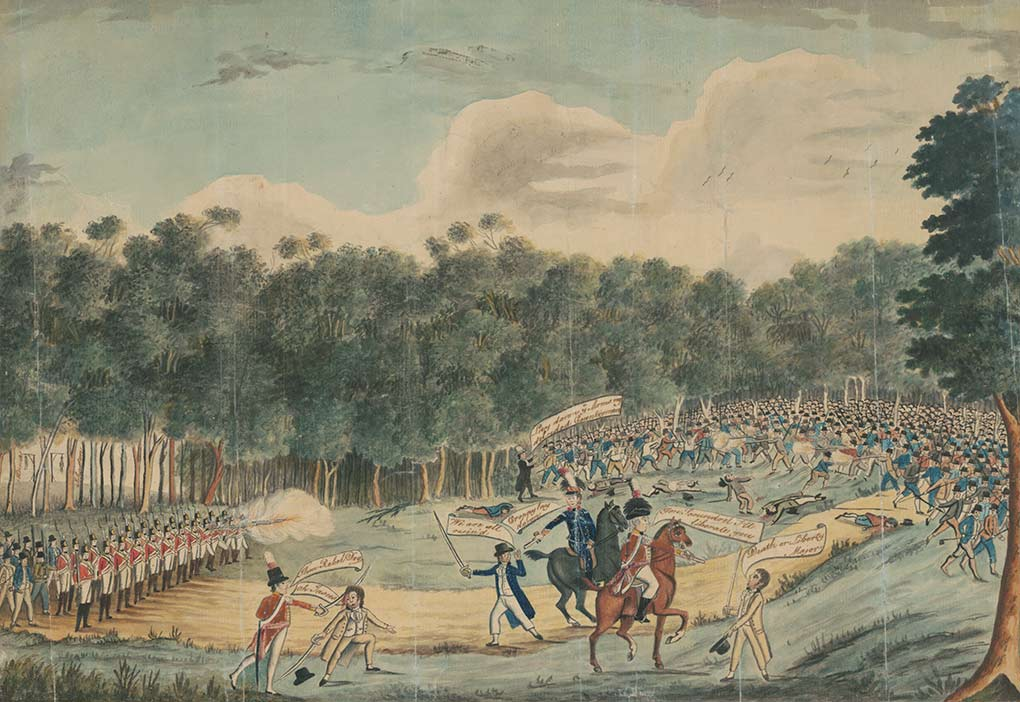
- An 1804 watercolour depicting the rebellion
Date	4–5 March 1804
Location	Castle Hill, New South Wales 33.7293°S 151.0040°E
Result	Rebellion suppressed

Belligerents
New South Wales	Convict rebels

Commanders and leaders
George Johnston; Thomas Anzelark	Phillip Cunningham (executed); William Johnston (executed)

Strength
30 regulars 67 militia	233 rebels

Casualties and losses
None	15 killed 9 executed 23 exiled
- Location within New South Wales

The Castle Hill convict rebellion (also known as Battle of Vinegar Hill) was a convict rebellion in Castle Hill, Sydney, then part of the British colony of New South Wales. Led by veterans of the Irish Rebellion of 1798, the poorly armed insurgents confronted the colonial forces of Australia on 5 March 1804 at Rouse Hill. Their rout in the resulting skirmish was hailed by loyalists as "Australia's Vinegar Hill" after the 1798 battle of Vinegar Hill, where Society of United Irishmen rebels were decisively defeated. The incident was the first major convict uprising in Australian history to be suppressed under martial law.

On 4 March 1804, 233 convicts, led by Philip Cunningham, a veteran of the Irish Rebellion of 1798 as well as a mutineer on the convict transport Anne, escaped from a prison farm, intent on "capturing ships to sail to Ireland". In response, martial law was quickly declared in the colony. The mostly Irish rebels, having gathered reinforcements, were pursued by colonial forces under George Johnston until they were caught on Rouse Hill on 5 March 1804.

While negotiating under a flag of truce, Cunningham was arrested. Johnston's troops then charged and scattered the rebels, and the rebellion was suppressed. Nine of the rebel leaders were executed, and hundreds were punished, before martial law was revoked a week after the battle.

== Background ==
=== Rising ===
Many convicts in the Castle Hill area were veterans of the United Irish movement and of the rebellion it had instigated in Ireland in the summer of 1798. From late 1799, they were transported as exiles-trial to the Colony of New South Wales. In September 1800, an Irish conspiracy was uncovered. The rebels planned to meet at and take Parramatta, and then before daylight take the Barracks at Sydney. Afterwards they planned to live on settlers farms, until they heard from France, where they had intended to dispatch a ship.

Early in 1804, after news arrived of Robert Emmet's attempted rising in Dublin the previous July, a similar conspiracy formed. Phillip Cunningham, a veteran of the rebellion of 1798, and William Johnston, another Irish convict at Castle Hill, planned an uprising. Over 685 Castle Hill convicts intended to join with nearly 1,100 convicts from the Hawkesbury River area, rally at Constitution Hill, and march on Parramatta and then Sydney Port Jackson itself. According to Helen Mackay, their goal was to establish Irish rule in the colony and obtain ships for those that wanted to return to Ireland to help revive the failed Irish Rebellion of 1803.

At 8 o'clock on the evening of 4 March 1804, John Cavenah set fire to his hut at Castle Hill as the signal for the rebellion to begin. While the fire was not seen by the convicts at Green Hills, today's Windsor, on the Hawkesbury River, Cunningham activated the plan to gather weapons, ammunition, food and recruits from local supporters and the government farm at Castle Hill. With Cunningham leading, about 200 to 300 rebels broke into the Government Farm's buildings, taking firearms, ammunition, and other weapons.

The constables and overseers were overpowered and the rebels then went from farm to farm on their way to Constitution Hill at Parramatta, seizing more weapons and supplies, including rum and spirits, and recruiting others to fight their cause. Their move had been informed by the intelligence gathered a year previously, when 12 convicts escaped from Castle Hill, seeking out friends and sympathisers in the surrounding districts. When captured, every convict had the same story: they were heading to China by crossing over the Blue Mountains.

=== Initial government response ===
When news of the uprising spread there was great panic amongst the colony of around 5,000 inhabitants. Officials such as Samuel Marsden fled the area by boat, escorting Elizabeth Macarthur and her children, because an informer had advised that an attack would be made on the Macarthur's farm so as to draw troops away from Parramatta. On receipt of the news of the uprising, Governor King set off alone for Parramatta to assume command, while Colonel William Paterson, the lieutenant governor, called out the guard.

One hundred and forty men from HMS Calcutta, as well as the Sydney Loyal Association militia, took over guard duties, and a New South Wales Corps contingent of 56 personnel, including Lieutenant William Davies and Quartermaster Sergeant Thomas Laycock, were dispatched to march through the night to bolster the garrison at Parramatta. Meanwhile, the provost marshal, Thomas Smyth, was sent ahead to contact Major George Johnston at Annandale. The troops from Sydney arrived at 1:30 am and, after a quick inspection, an advanced guard was sent to the west of the town. Johnston arrived at Government House in Parramatta about four hours later, not long after King had declared martial law under the Mansfield doctrine of posse comitatus.

King's proclamation of martial law applied to a wide area, extending from Castle Hill to the Hawkesbury and Nepean areas, and empowered citizens in the area to detain those who lacked the appropriate passes. A curfew had also been enacted and an amnesty declared, which gave those who were involved 24 hours to surrender. On Johnston's arrival at Parramatta, King delivered his orders to Johnston in writing, and then verbally to his small detachment. Johnston was to proceed to the western gate of the park around Government House, where the rebels had been seen a few hours earlier. If they were not there, he was ordered to exploit towards Toongabbie and Castle Hill to locate them and then await further orders. He was also empowered to fire upon anyone who did not obey his directions.

Shortly after 5:00 am, Johnston set out to locate the main rebel force. In addition to the troops he had brought with him, a number of civilians volunteered. The 36 armed members of the Parramatta Loyal Association militia were also called out, and took over defence of the town. Over 50 men enrolled in a reserve militia combined with the New South Wales Corps to march out and confront the rebels. Johnston decided to advance in two columns, one which he led himself towards Toongabbie, and another under a subaltern, Davies, which was sent along the Castle Hill Road.

=== Rebel preparations ===
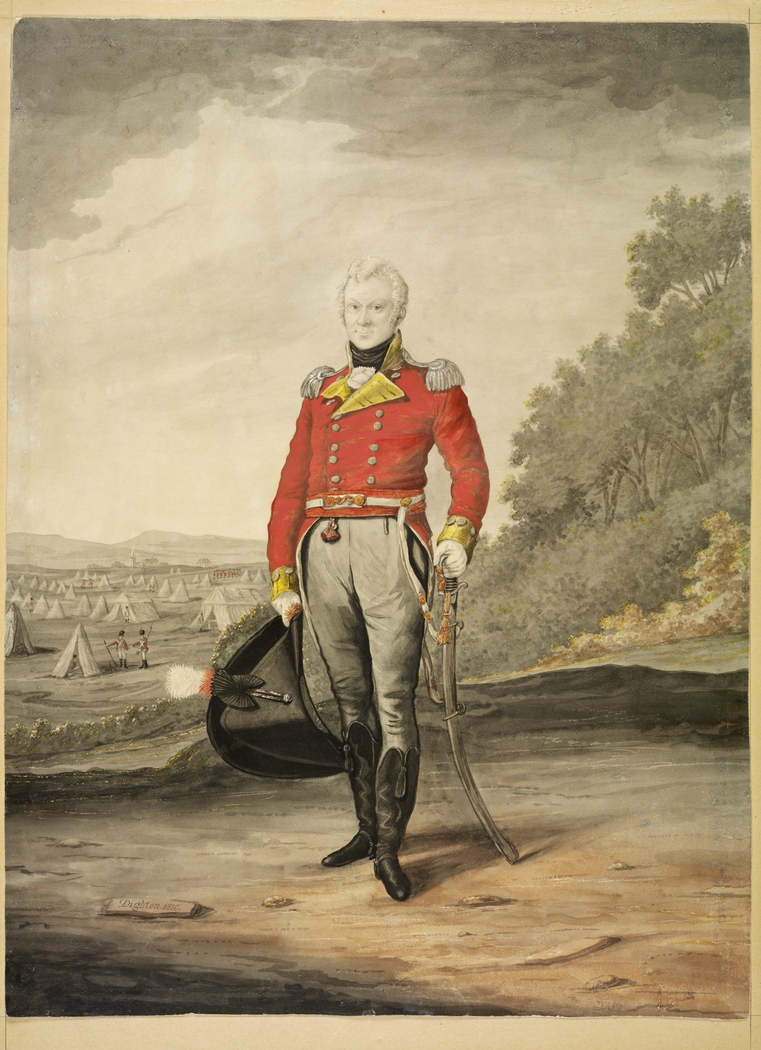
George Johnston, who led the military response to the rebellion, as a lieutenant colonel in 1810.

Meanwhile, the rebels at Constitution Hill (Toongabbie) were having difficulty co-ordinating their force because several parties, including one of around 70 men under Samuel Humes, had lost their way in the night. Cunningham and Johnston began drilling their men, while a party unsuccessfully tried to enter Parramatta, where they were to set fire to a building to signal other conspirators to begin converging on Constitution Hill.

Cunningham, being involved in two previous rebellions, as well as the mutiny on the Anne, knew from experience that the most important element of a rebellion or uprising would be secrecy. There were two defections: an Irish convict overseer named Sloane, and Lewis Bulger. The commandant at Parramatta, Captain Edward Abbott, who had warning of the rebellion as it was happening, commenced defensive measures and sent a message to the governor in Sydney.

With their courier, John Griffen, having had second thoughts about passing on the instructions Cunningham had given him to convey to Brian Furey, and subsequently being arrested, the call out messages to Windsor, Parramatta and Sydney failed, and the uprising was confined to the west of the Parramatta area. After fruitlessly waiting for a signal of a successful takeover of Parramatta, and with the non-appearance of reinforcements, Cunningham was forced to withdraw from Parramatta to Toongabbie to re-assess his strategy.

Having already declared his hand and therefore deprived of surprise, as well as facing a superior and well disciplined detachment of the New South Wales Corps and enthusiastic militia force from the Loyal Volunteers, Cunningham had no recourse but to withdraw west towards the Hawkesbury, hoping to add to his forces by picking up more recruits and to meet his missing forces on the way.

Knowing that going forward would only see more death and a possible routing, the rebels quickly moved westward, hoping to join up with those now heading east from Green Hills (Windsor) in the area of today's Rouse Hill and Kellyville, recruiting or impressing a number of convicts along the way. Those later giving evidence stated they were press-ganged into service in hope of lessening their punishment.

During that phase, the rebels obtained around a third of the colony's entire armaments. Their numbers had dwindled to several hundred, eventually totalling around 233, according to the Government controlled newspaper of the time. While at Constitution Hill during the short period of the rebellion, Cunningham was elected "King of the Australian Empire", and his followers declared the area "New Ireland".

== Battle ==
Major Johnston's contingent, wearied by their night march, needed time to close with the retreating rebels, who were reported to number around 400. To implement delaying tactics, Major Johnston rode after the rebels with a small mounted party, while the rest of his party completed the 4 miles (6.4 km) march to Toongabbie. Initially, it was believed that the rebels were at Toongabbie, but on his arrival, Major Johnston was informed that they had moved to Constitution Hill. A small party under a corporal was sent to outflank that position, while an assault force of around a dozen men advanced on the summit, only to find it abandoned, with the rebels having moved off towards the Hawkesbury, about 17 miles (27 km) away.

As the morning progressed, the heat of the day threatened to stymie the efforts of the marching troops who were poorly equipped for the pursuit. About 6 miles (9.7 km) from Toongabbie, Major Johnston located the main rebel party of around 230 to 260 men near Rouse Hill, Major Johnston first sent a mounted trooper on to call the rebels to give up and benefit from the Governor's amnesty for early surrender. That having failed, he dispatched a Roman Catholic priest, Father James Dixon, to appeal to them. He then rode up himself, and got their agreement to hear Father Dixon again.

Meanwhile, the pursuing forces had closed in and Major Johnston, with Trooper Thomas Anlezark, from the Governor's Body Guard of Light Horse, approached them again to parley, calling the leaders Cunningham and William Johnston down from the hill. Demanding their surrender, he received the response "Death or Liberty" from Cunningham, to which some were reported to have added "and a ship to take us home", although that exchange was only once recorded, some time later, by Suttor.

With the NSW Corps and militia formed up in firing lines behind Major Johnston, he and Trooper Anlezark produced pistols, while negotiating under truce, duping the two leaders of the uprising, and escorting them back to the soldiers' lines. On being given the order to engage, Quartermaster Sergeant Thomas Laycock directed more than fifteen minutes of musket fire at the rebel lines and then charged, cutting Cunningham down with his cutlass. The now-leaderless rebels tried to fire back, but then broke and dispersed.

According to official reports, at least fifteen rebels fell during the battle. Major Johnston prevented further bloodshed by threatening his troops with his pistol to temper their enthusiasm. Several convicts were captured and an unknown number killed in the ensuing pursuit of the rebels, which continued until late in the night, with newly arrived soldiers from Sydney joining in the search. It was reported that gun shots could be heard up to a fortnight later, such was the settling of old scores. On Wednesday, 7 March, Governor King announced that those who surrendered before 10 March would receive leniency and, following that, large parties who lost their way in the night turned themselves in under the amnesty, or made their way back to Castle Hill, where a large party of about 70, led by Samuel Humes, was captured by a detachment of the Loyal Parramatta Association.

== Aftermath ==
According to the official records of the day, around 230 people were brought in over next few days and, of the convicts directly engaged in the battle, 15 were killed. Nine were executed, including the ringleaders Cunningham and William Johnston, with two, Johnson and Humes, subjected to "hanging in chains" or gibbeting. Two men, John Burke and Bryan McCormack, were reprieved and detained at the Governor's pleasure, seven were whipped with 200 or 500 lashes and sent to the Coal River chain gang, while 23 others, including Cavenah, were sent to the Newcastle coal mines.

Another 34 prisoners were placed in irons until they could be "disposed of". It is not known whether some or all of them were sent to Coal River. Of the remaining rebels (approximately 150), some were put on good behaviour orders, in default being sent to Norfolk Island, while the majority were pardoned and allowed to return to their places of employment, it having been adjudged that they were coerced into the uprising.

Cunningham, badly wounded but still alive, was court-martialled under the martial law decree, and hanged at the Commissariat Store at Windsor, which he had bragged he would burn down. Initially, military officers were intent on hanging a token number of those captured, having convened a military court at the Whipping Green but that was quickly stopped by Governor King, fearful of the repercussions.

Martial law was lifted on 10 March 1804, but that did not end the insurgency. Irish plots continued to develop, keeping the Government and its informers vigilant, with military call-out rehearsals continuing over the next three years. Governor King remained convinced that the inspirers of revolt had kept out of sight, and had some suspects sent to Norfolk Island as a preventive measure.

=== Location ===
The location of the battlefield within the modern Sydney area

The battle site is believed to be to the east of the site of the Rouse Hill Estate, and it is likely that Richard Rouse, a staunch establishment figure, was given his grant at this site specifically to prevent it becoming a significant site for Irish convicts. "The Government Farm at Castle Hill", a plot of land around 60 hectares (150 acres), was added in March 1986 to the now defunct Register of the National Estate, as a special place of international and Australian significance.

Residential development has significantly diminished the area of the prison town. Less than 20 hectares (49 acres) has remained undeveloped and conserved, as Castle Hill Heritage Park, established in 2004. There is a sculpture near the battle site at Castlebrook Cemetery commemorating the sacrifice. There is some debate as to where the battle actually occurred.

=== Commemoration ===
The bicentenary of the rebellion was commemorated in 2004, with a variety of events. The re-enactment in 2004 was significant in that exact numbers were recruited to form the rebels, the militia and the military. The event was held near the original site on a similar landscape. The re-enactment was recorded by the ABC.

The battle has been depicted on screen. An Australian 1978 TV series, Against the Wind, included a dramatization over two episodes of the build-up to and ultimate defeat of the rebellion. A monument commemorating the battle was erected at Castlebrook Memorial Park, on Windsor Road, Rouse Hill. It was dedicated in March 1988.

It was also dramatised in the radio play Castle Hill.

== See also ==
- Bathurst Rebellion
- Norfolk Island convict mutinies
- List of Irish rebellions
