= Castle Hill, New South Wales =

Suburb of Sydney, Australia

Castle Hill
- Suburb
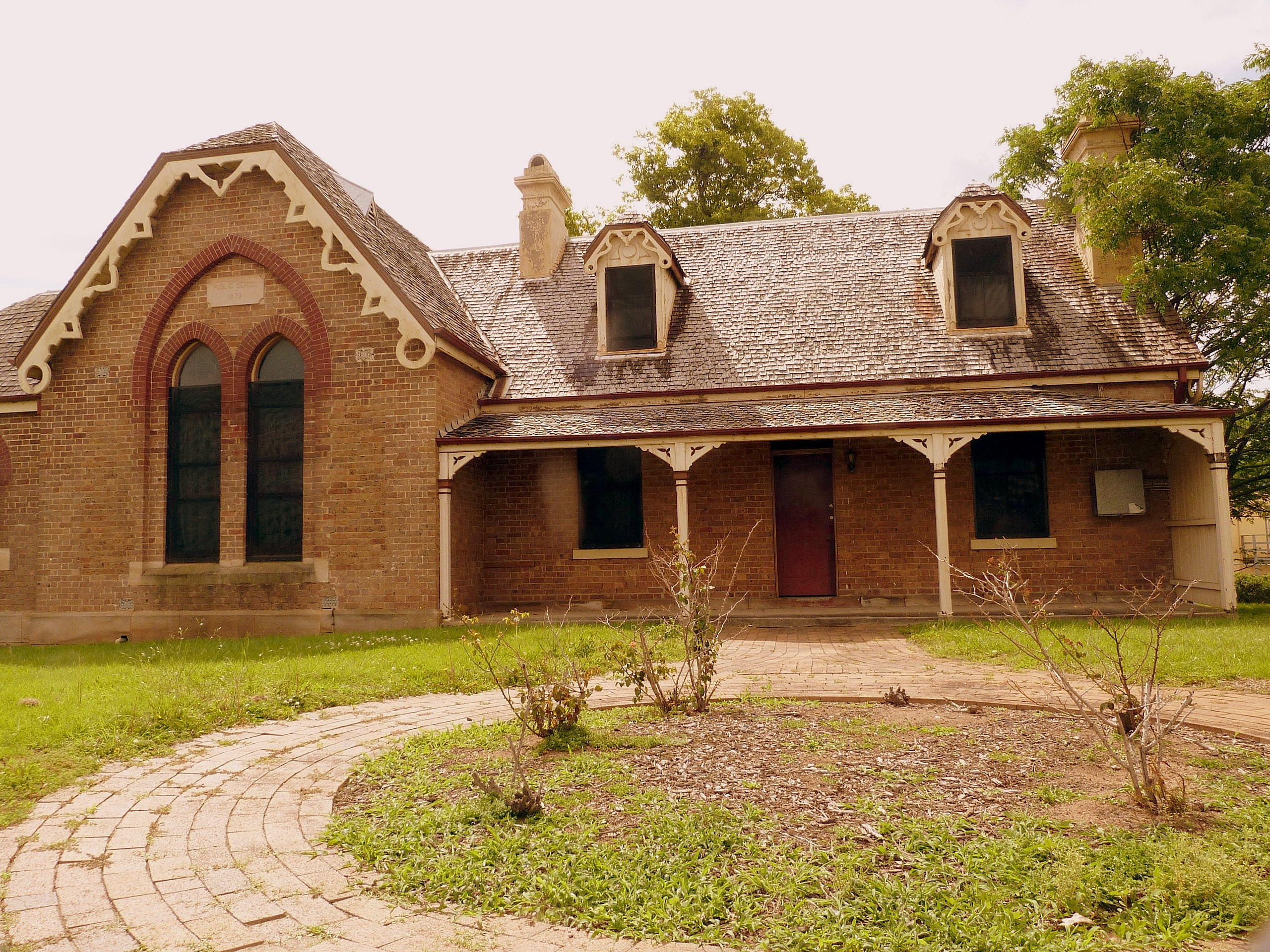
- Public school (1879)

- Interactive map of Castle Hill
- Coordinates: 33°43′45″S 151°0′14″E
- Country: Australia
- State: New South Wales
- City: Sydney
- LGAs: The Hills Shire; Hornsby Shire
- Location: 31.9 km (19.8 mi) north-west of Sydney CBD
- Established: 1802

Government
  - State electorate: Castle Hill
  - Federal division: Mitchell
- Elevation: 142 m (466 ft)

Population
  - Total: 40,874 (2021 census)
- Postcode: 2154
Suburbs around Castle Hill
| Kellyville | Glenhaven | Dural |
| Norwest | Castle Hill | Cherrybrook |
| Baulkham Hills | West Pennant Hills | West Pennant Hills |

Castle Hill is a suburb of Sydney, New South Wales, Australia, located 34 kilometres north-west of the Sydney central business district and 9.5 kilometres north of Parramatta. It is within the Hills District region, split between the local government areas of The Hills Shire and Hornsby Shire.

== History ==
=== Indigenous history ===
The land that is now called Castle Hill was originally home to the Bidjigal people, who are believed to be a clan of the Darug people, who occupied all the land to the immediate west of Sydney. The best-known Aboriginal person from that time is Pemulwuy, a Bidjigal leader who led the resistance movement against settlers during the Hawkesbury and Nepean Wars, including sacking farms in Castle Hill, before his eventual capture and killing by bounty hunter Henry Hacking.

The Bidjigal people are today commemorated by Bidjigal Reserve which straddles the suburbs of Castle Hill, Baulkham Hills, North Rocks and West Pennant Hills.

=== European settlement ===
The first European visitors to the district were led by Governor Phillip in April 1791 accompanied by an entourage. Travelling from Parramatta reaching the 'hills' following the Aboriginal trails, which today are overlaid by the Windsor and Old Northern Roads. As Governor he needed to find new country for settlement and farming land for crops so as to feed a struggling infant colony.

Governor King began Third Government Farm there on 8 July 1801, referring to it as "Castle Hill" on 1 March 1802. The majority of the convicts who worked the prison farm were Irish Catholics, many having been transported for seditious activity in 1798. They were branded "politicals" and exiled for life, never to return.

The first free settler in Castle Hill, a Frenchman Baron Verincourt de Clambe, in unusual circumstances received a grant of 200 acres (81 ha) in 1802. It has been suggested that locals of the time commonly referred to de Clambe's house ("The Hermitage") as "The Castle" because of the Baron's noble status.

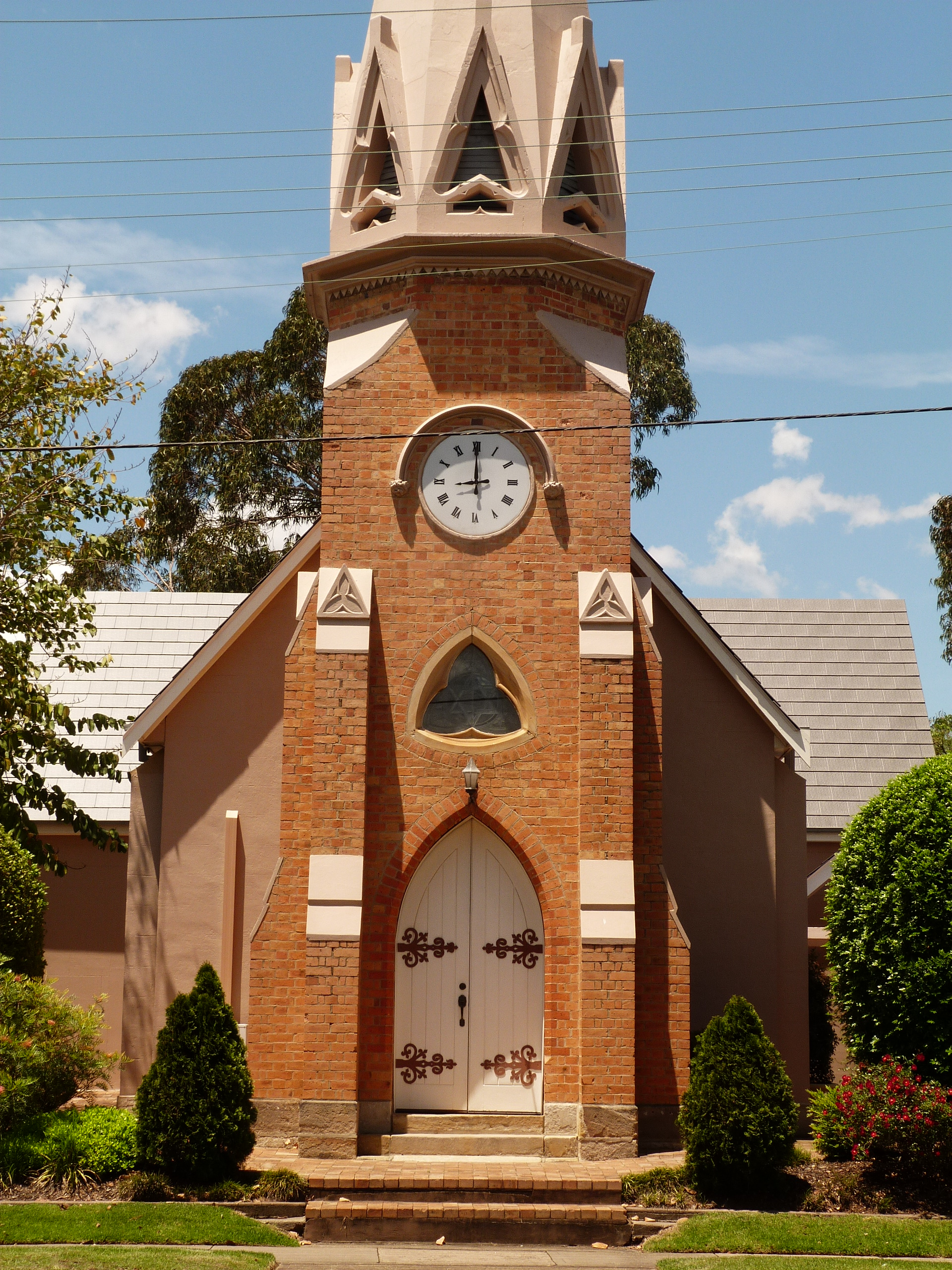
Former church, Old Northern Road

On Sunday night 4 March 1804, the convicts rose up as one in what was to become known as the Castle Hill convict rebellion, also known as the Second Battle of Vinegar Hill.

In later years, the area became filled with market gardens and orchards which supplied Sydney. As Sydney expanded, the orchards disappeared and were replaced with a sprawl of suburban dwellings, retail and commercial establishments and light industry. The Hills Shire Council commemorates the shire's former role as an orange-growing area with the Orange Blossom Festival each year.

Castle Hill Post Office opened on 1 January 1869.

=== 20th century ===
In the past Castle Hill was serviced by the Rogans Hill railway line to Parramatta to take the rural area's produce to the city. The line opened on 28 January 1923. However, on 21 January 1932 the railway line was closed as it had not been a financial success.

Local landmarks include:

- Castle Hill House (circa 1844) on Old Northern Road, which has a local-government heritage listing;
- The public school (1879), Old Northern Road, also with a LG heritage listing;
- The former parsonage (1866), Parsonage Road;
- The former church, Old Northern Road, now converted to commercial use.

A notable part of Castle Hill's cultural history was the period from the post-war period until 1968 in which Nobel laureate Patrick White and his partner Manoly Lascaris lived at 74 Showground Road in a house they named "Dogwoods". For much of that period, they worked several hectares of farmland at the site. White wrote several of his most well-known novels while at Castle Hill; the suburb formed the basis of fictional settings for the novels The Tree of Man, The Solid Mandala, Riders in the Chariot, the collection of short stories The Burnt Ones, and the play The Season at Sarsaparilla. In his work, Castle Hill went variously by the names of "Sarsaparilla" and Durilgai". White based several characters on his experience of local individuals in Castle Hill at the time.

== Heritage listings ==
Castle Hill has a number of heritage-listed sites, including:

- Gilbert Road: Third Government Farm
- 221 Old Northern Road: St Paul's Anglican Church, Castle Hill (former)

== Demographics ==
Historical population
| Year | Pop. | ±% |
|---|---|---|
| 2001 | 31,530 | — |
| 2006 | 35,386 | +12.2% |
| 2011 | 37,915 | +7.1% |
| 2016 | 39,594 | +4.4% |
| 2021 | 40,874 | +3.2% |

=== Summary ===
Selected data from 2021 census for Castle Hill
| Population | Estimated residents on census night | 40,874 |
| Population | Estimated ATSI population on census night | 157 |
| Cultural and language diversity | | |
| Ancestry, top responses | English | 21.4% |
| Ancestry, top responses | Chinese | 20.2% |
| Ancestry, top responses | Australian | 19.4% |
| Ancestry, top responses | Indian | 7.4% |
| Ancestry, top responses | Irish | 7.1% |
| Language, top responses (other than English) | Mandarin | 11.4% |
| Language, top responses (other than English) | Cantonese | 4.8% |
| Language, top responses (other than English) | Korean | 3.1% |
| Language, top responses (other than English) | Hindi | 2.3% |
| Language, top responses (other than English) | Persian (excluding Dari) | 2.0% |
| Religious affiliation | | |
| Religious affiliation, top responses | No religion, so described | 29.6% |
| Religious affiliation, top responses | Catholic | 23.7% |
| Religious affiliation, top responses | Anglican | 11.3% |
| Religious affiliation, top responses | Hinduism | 6.2% |
| Religious affiliation, top responses | Not Stated | 4.6% |
| Median weekly incomes | | |
| Personal income | Median weekly personal income | A$931 |
| Personal income | % of Australian median income | 115.7% |
| Family income | Median weekly family income | A$2,858 |
| Family income | % of Australian median income | 134.8% |
| Household income | Median weekly household income | A$2,551 |
| Household income | % of Australian median income | 146.1% |
| Dwelling structure | | |
| Dwelling type | Separate house | 73.7% |
| Dwelling type | Semi-detached, terrace or townhouse | 10.9% |
| Dwelling type | Flat or apartment | 15.3% |

=== Population ===
According to the 2021 census, there were 40,874 residents in Castle Hill. 53.3% of people were born in Australia. The next most common countries of birth were China 9.2%, India 5.4%, England 3.0%, South Korea 2.5% and Hong Kong 1.9%. In Castle Hill 54.4% of people only spoke English at home. Other languages spoken at home included Mandarin 11.4%, Cantonese 4.8%, Korean 3.1%, Hindi 2.3% and Persian 2.0%. The most common responses for religion in Castle Hill were no religion 29.6%, Catholic 23.7%, Anglican 11.3%, and Hinduism at 6.2%.

=== Wealth ===
Castle Hill residents have a personal income that is 15.7% greater than the median national income.

The median weekly income was $931 compared to $805 on a national level; the family income was $2,858 compared to the national average of $2,120; the household median weekly income was $2,551 compared to the national average of $1,746.

== Commercial areas ==
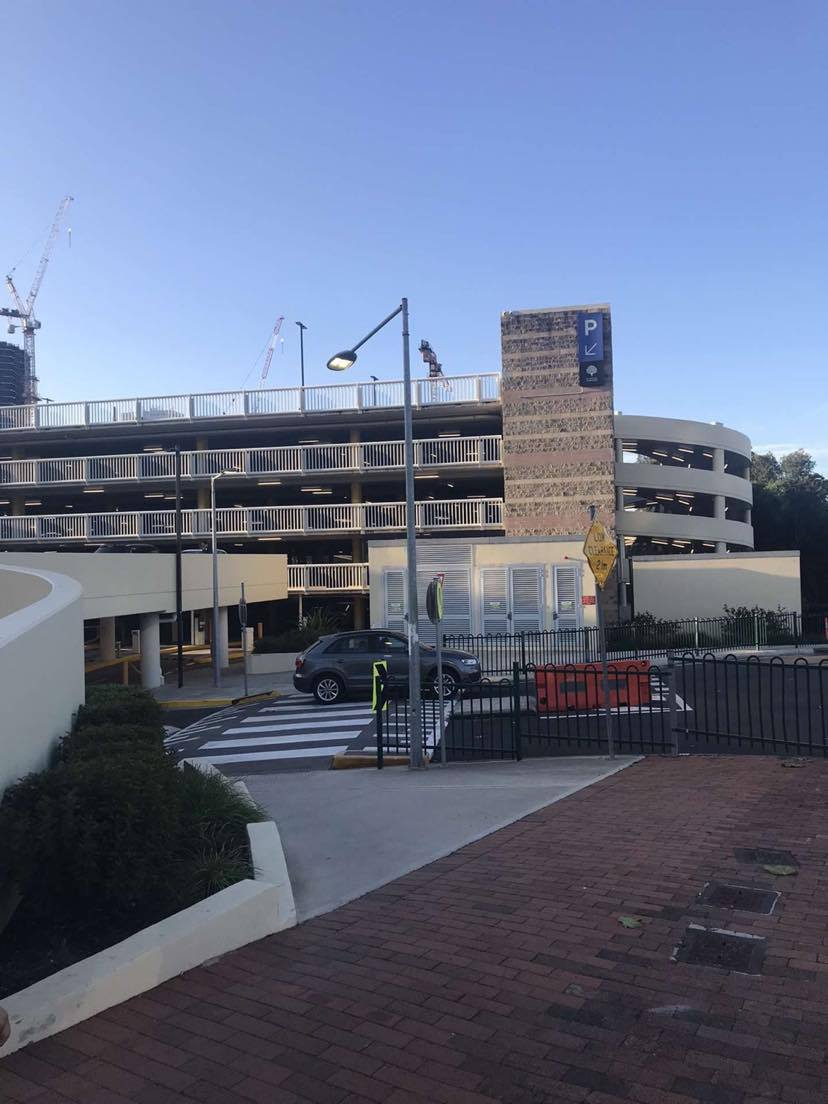
Castle Towers Shopping Centre | May 2020

Castle Hill's commercial area centres on a section of the Old Northern Road at the suburb's eastern side. Its southern side is an older, traditional shopping strip, with the modest-sized Castle Mall shopping centre. Its northern side is dominated by the large Castle Towers shopping centre, with two department stores as well as two Event cinema multiplexes (giving a total of 16 Cinemas). A new library and community centre, with a unit apartment building on its upper floors, opened next to Castle Towers in 2004.

Work has finished by the local council to convert the stretch of Old Northern Road between Castle Mall and Castle Towers, into a plaza walk way. The main traffic road has been diverted through the nearby, Terminus Street. A$900 million plan to add 80,000 square metres to the Castle Towers Shopping Centre has been approved, which will result in Castle Towers becoming the largest shopping centre in New South Wales, with a total of 190,000 square metres of active floorspace.

Castle Hill also has a light industrial area at the suburb's western side. It is linked with the commercial area by Showground Road. The Castle Hill Showground and location of the former Hills Shire Council Chambers and Hills Centre are adjacent to this area which now also include another smaller shopping centre, Showgrounds Village anchored by a Woolworths supermarket.

== Residential areas ==
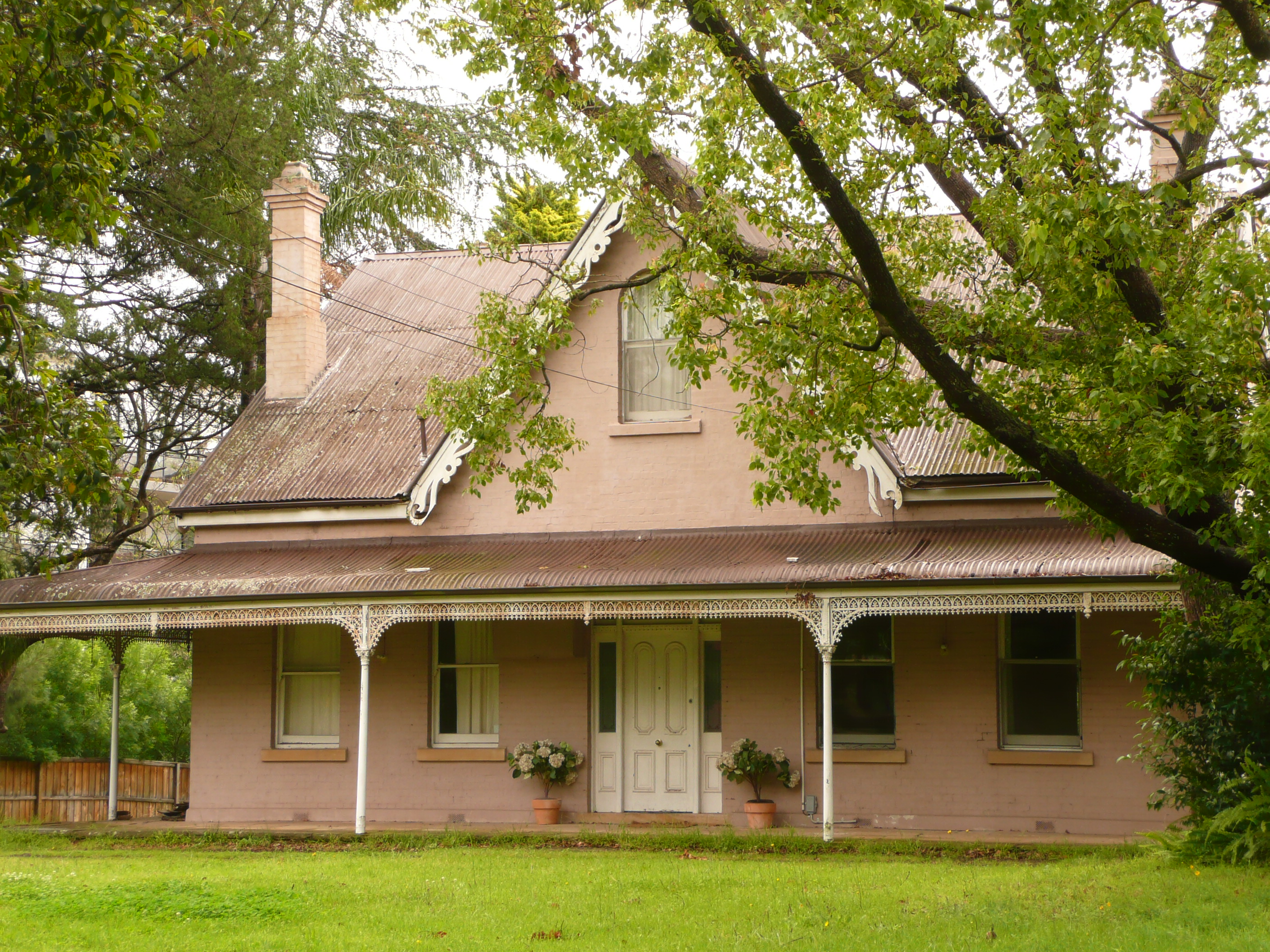
Verandahed bungalow, Benaara Garden

Castle Hill is a mix of low to medium-density housing, with exception to a few apartment complexes. In 2005 year under the NSW Housing Strategy Hume Avenue was rezoned to medium density, to allow for low rise unit, and town house developments.

The largest residential area in Castle Hill is located at the two sides of Showground Road, sandwiched between the commercial and the industrial area. Smaller residential areas are located at the east of the commercial area, as well as the suburb's north-east (part of Hornsby Shire, separated by Old Northern Road and Castle Hill Road). These consist almost entirely of free-standing houses. Several government and private schools, as well as an RSL Club, are located within these areas. To the north of Showground Road lies suburban, with approximately 1000 homes, the Samuel Gilbert Public School, Castle Glen Oval and the Knightsbridge Shopping Court. South of Showground Road, and to the east of Old Northern Road, lies the East Excelsior section of the suburb, known for its leafy streets, mature gardens and established homes on large land parcels, which is adjacent to Bidjigal Reserve. Managed by a community Trust, Bidjigal Reserve is about 186ha of bushland located within the Sydney suburbs of Castle Hill, West Pennant Hills, Beecroft, Cherrybrook, North Rocks and Baulkham Hills. There are many walking trails, and three marked tracks: Platypus loops along creeks from the entrance at Excelsior Ave; Burraga follows creeks and climbs Bald Hill from Platypus track, and the Murri Yanna begins at Aiken Road or Heidi Place and follows Darling Mills Creek to North Parramatta.

== Transport ==
The bulk of Castle Hill residents own private vehicles and travel to work using these, however bus services and the Sydney Metro Northwest run to the suburb. The Sydney Metro Northwest stops at both the main commercial area and the Hills Showground.

Private vehicle use to travel to work either as a passenger or the driver was 34.6% as of the 2021 census, and 67.8% as of the 2016 census; in 2021 3.7% of people used public transport to travel to work compared to 17.6% in 2016; 6.1% of people were working at home in 2016 compared to 47.6% in 2021.

=== Bus ===
Castle Hill is well served by private buses operated by CDC NSW which provides express services to Sydney CBD, as well as Parramatta, Pennant Hills, West Pennant Hills, Beecroft, Dural, Hornsby, Macquarie Park, Baulkham Hills, Rouse Hill, Cherrybrook and Busways, which provides services to Stanhope Gardens, Kellyville, Glenwood, Bella Vista and Blacktown. Castle Hill is served by the following services:

CDC NSW

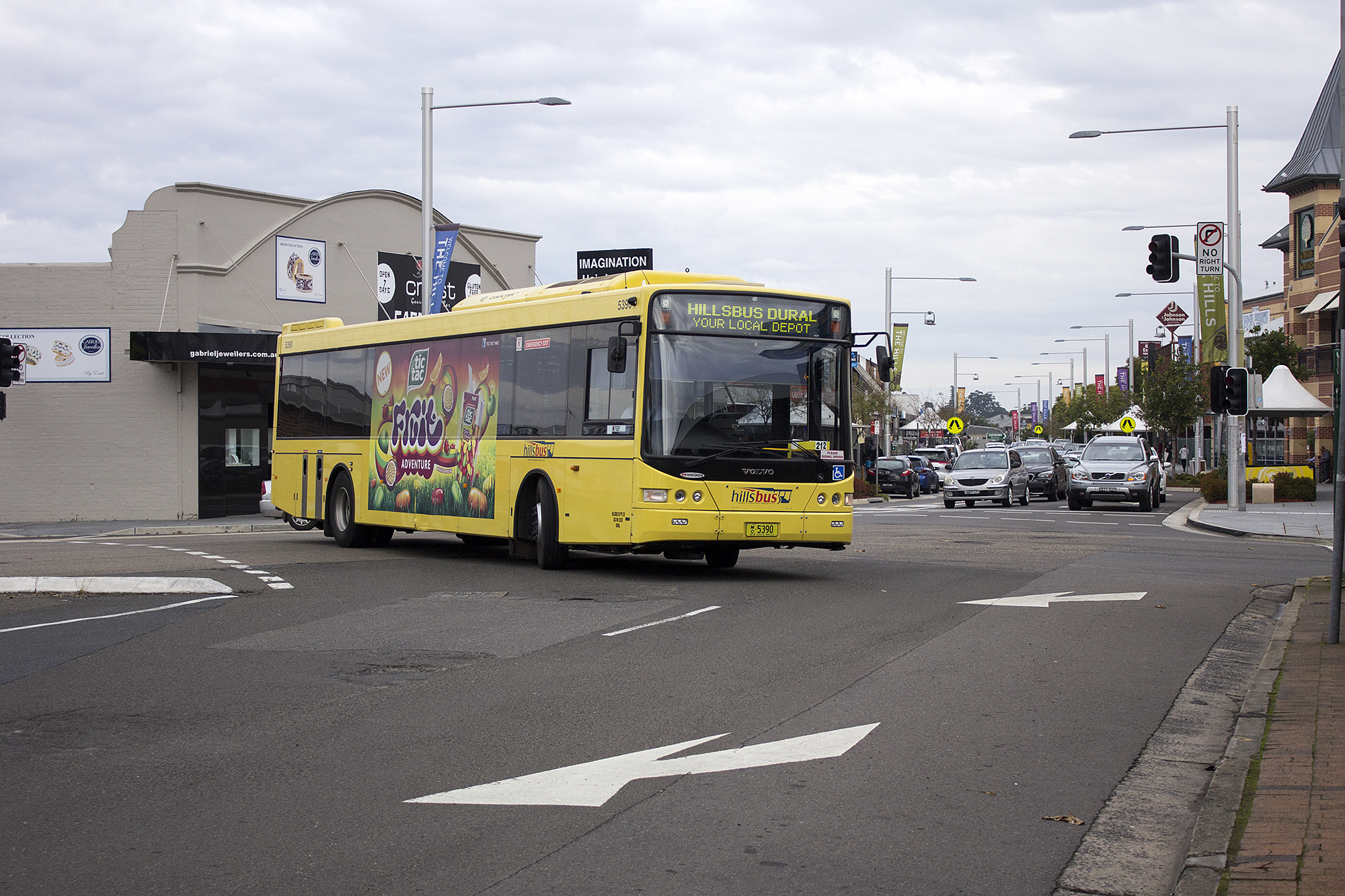
Castle Hill Bus interchange

- 600 – Pennant Hills to Parramatta via Cherrybrook and Baulkham Hills
- 603 – Rouse Hill Town Centre to Parramatta via Kellyville, Glenhaven and Baulkham Hills
- 604 – Dural to Parramatta via Hills Showground, Jasper Road and Churchill Drive
- 610X – Castle Hill to Queen Victoria Building via M2 Motorway
- 626 – Kellyville to Pennant Hills via Hills Showground and Cherrybrook Station
- 632 – Rouse Hill to Pennant Hills via Norwest, Tuckwell Road, Anglican Retirement Village and Cherrybrook Station
- 633 – Rouse Hill to Pennant Hills via Beaumont Hills, Kellyville, Hills Showground and Cherrybrook Station
- 634 – Castle Hill to Castlewood Estate
- 635 – Castle Hill to Beecroft via Anglican Retirement Village, Cherrybrook Village, Cherrybrook Station and West Pennant Hills
- 637 – Castle Hill to Glenorie
- 638 – Castle Hill to Berrilee
- 639 – Castle Hill to Kenthurst
- 651 – Rouse Hill to Epping via T-Way, Kellyville, Hills Showground, West Pennant Hills and Beecroft
- 660 – Castle Hill to Parramatta via Hills Showground, Crestwood and Winston Hills
- 662 – Castle Hill to Parramatta via Tuckwell Road and Norwest

Busways

- 730 – Castle Hill to Blacktown

=== Rail ===
Castle Hill is served by the Castle Hill and Hills Showground stations of the Metro North West & Bankstown Line, which opened on 26 May 2019, connecting Tallawong to Chatswood via Epping. With the Sydney Metro City & Southwest project under construction, service will continue to the Sydney central business district by 2024.

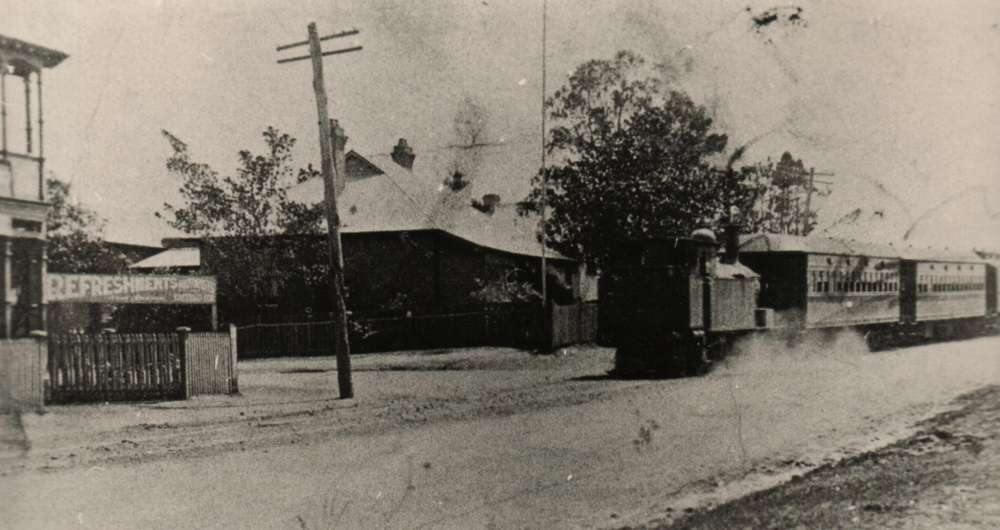
A train runs through Castle Hill, near Showground Road, in 1910

Between 1910 and 1932, Castle Hill was connected to Parramatta by the Rogans Hill railway line, which opened as a steam tramway line, on 30 July 1910. Major works were undertaken in 1922 to convert the line into a railway, and trains began servicing Castle Hill on 28 January 1923. In 1924, the railway line was extended beyond its existing terminus to Rogans Hill. As a cost-cutting measure, the state Labor government of Jack Lang closed the line on 31 January 1932, amid much public protest.

Several proposals existed for another rail line to Castle Hill, resulting in the Sydney Metro Northwest beginning construction on 18 June 2014.

== Education ==
- Gilroy Catholic College – Private Catholic College
- William Clarke College – Private Anglican School, K-12
- Oakhill College – Private Catholic College
- St. Bernadette's – Catholic Co-Educational Primary School
- Castle Hill High School – Public High School
- Castle Hill Public School – Public Primary School
- Excelsior Public School – Public Primary School
- Samuel Gilbert Public School – Public Primary School
- St. Angela's – Catholic Co-Educational Primary School
- Oakhill Drive Public School – Public Primary School
- Castle Hill House – Vocational Centre run by Redeemer Baptist Church
- Hills Adventist College – Private Seventh Day Adventist K-12 School

== Cultural activities ==
The Hills Centre for the Performing Arts was a theatre and convention venue located on Showground Road, Castle Hill. Opened in late 1988 and under the ownership of The Hills Shire Council it was one of the largest venues of this type in New South Wales until it was demolished in 2013 to make way for the Sydney Metro Northwest.

Castle Hill Players put on six plays a year at the Pavilion Theatre in the grounds of the Castle Hill Showground. They have entertained at the Pavilion Theatre since 1966.

Castle Hill is home to storage for the Powerhouse Museum. The Museums Discovery Centre (MDC) is a collaboration between the Museum of Applied Arts and Sciences (MAAS), Australian Museum (AM) and Sydney Living Museums (SLM). The Museums Discovery Centre is an off-site visible storage and collection care facility, located on the corner of Windsor and Showground roads in Castle Hill. It has a unique and diverse collection of 400,000 objects spanning history, science, technology, design, industry, decorative arts, music, transport and space exploration. The MDC houses 40 per cent of the collection (by volume), or about 50,000 objects and is now open to the general public.

Access programs include themed supervised tours into stores on site; educational programs and workshops, tours for school groups and special-interest groups; school holiday programs; community engagement programs; regional partnership events; and specialist/industry and professional development programs. These provide insight not only to MAAS, AM and SLM Collections but to the important preservation undertaken there.

The Hills Craft Markets are open the fourth Sunday of each month, except January. A variety of arts and crafts and foods are offered for sale. Children can enjoy plaster painting, music, riding and playing in the showground.

In late March the annual Castle Hill Agricultural Show is held at the Castle Hill Showground. This show dates back to the 1880s and reflects the heritage of the Hills District. The show is mainly agricultural with many sheep, cattle and horse competitions on every year. The Castle Hill show also includes novelty games and items, showbags and educational stalls. The show runs for three days over the weekend (Friday, Saturday, and Sunday).

== Parks & Recreation ==
Castle Hill is home to multiple parks featuring a varied range of facilities.

Parks managed by The Hills Shire:

- Ambleside Drive Reserve and Skate Park
- Arthur Whitling Park
- Bert Parkinson Reserve
- Castle Glen Reserve and Skate Park
- Castle Hill Heritage Park
- Castle Hill Showground
- Castlewood Community Reserve
- Cockayne Reserve
- Coolong Reserve
- Eric Mobbs Reserve
- Fred Caterson Reserve
- Glendale Park Reserve
- Green Up Park
- Hansey Farm Reserve
- Parsonage Road Reserve
- Telfer Way Reserve
- Woodhill Street Reserve
- Worthing Avenue Reserve

Parks managed by Hornsby Shire:

- Erlestoke Park Playground
- Hastings Park Playground
- Tahlee Park Playground
- Westminster Park Playground

== Notable residents ==
Notable current and former residents of the suburb include:

- Patrick White – Nobel Prize-winning novelist, playwright, poet, short-story writer, essayist and his partner Manoly Lascaris lived in Castle Hill for eighteen years after World War II
- Edmond Samuels – pharmacist, composer, author and his partner Joseph Smith lived in Castle Hill from 1950 until his death in 1973
- Ray Warren – sports commentator, nicknamed "Rabbits" or "Rabbs"
- Christina Parie – 6th place on The X Factor Australia season 3
- Georgia Garnett – Greater Western Sydney AFL Women's player
- Jonathon Webb – racing driver
- Josh Green – basketball player

== Gallery ==
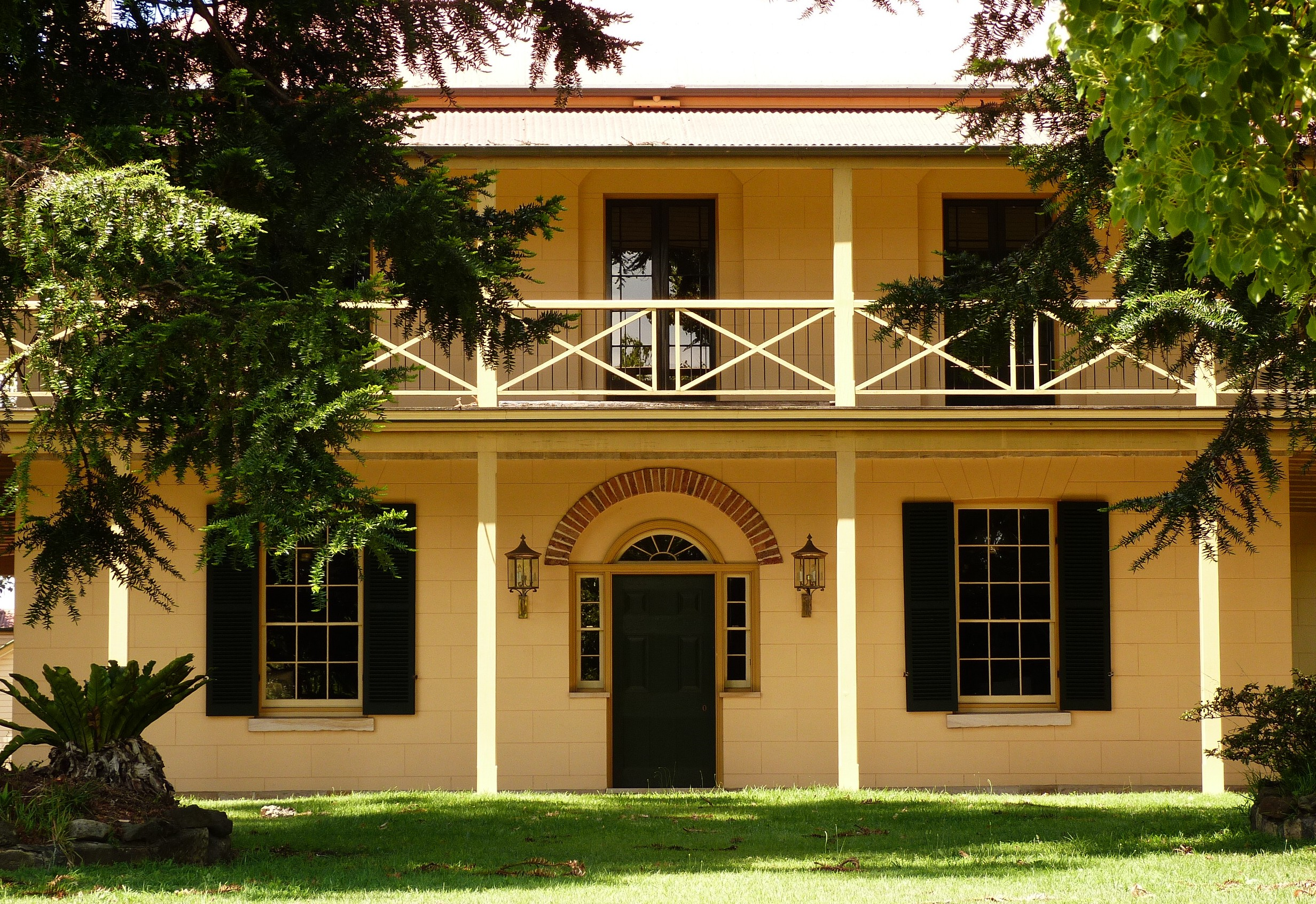
Castle Hill House (circa 1844), Old Northern Road

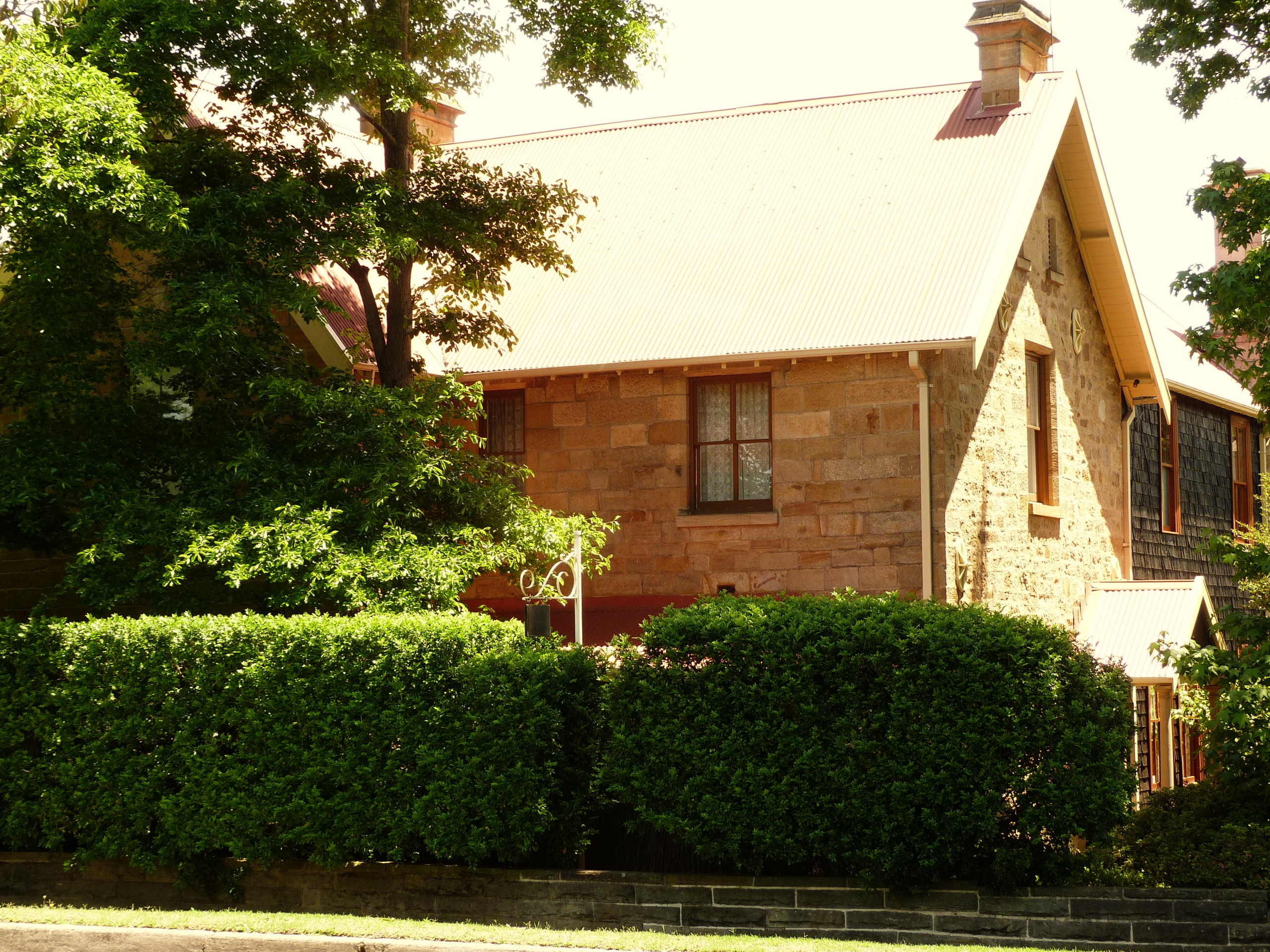
Former parsonage (1866), Parsonage Road

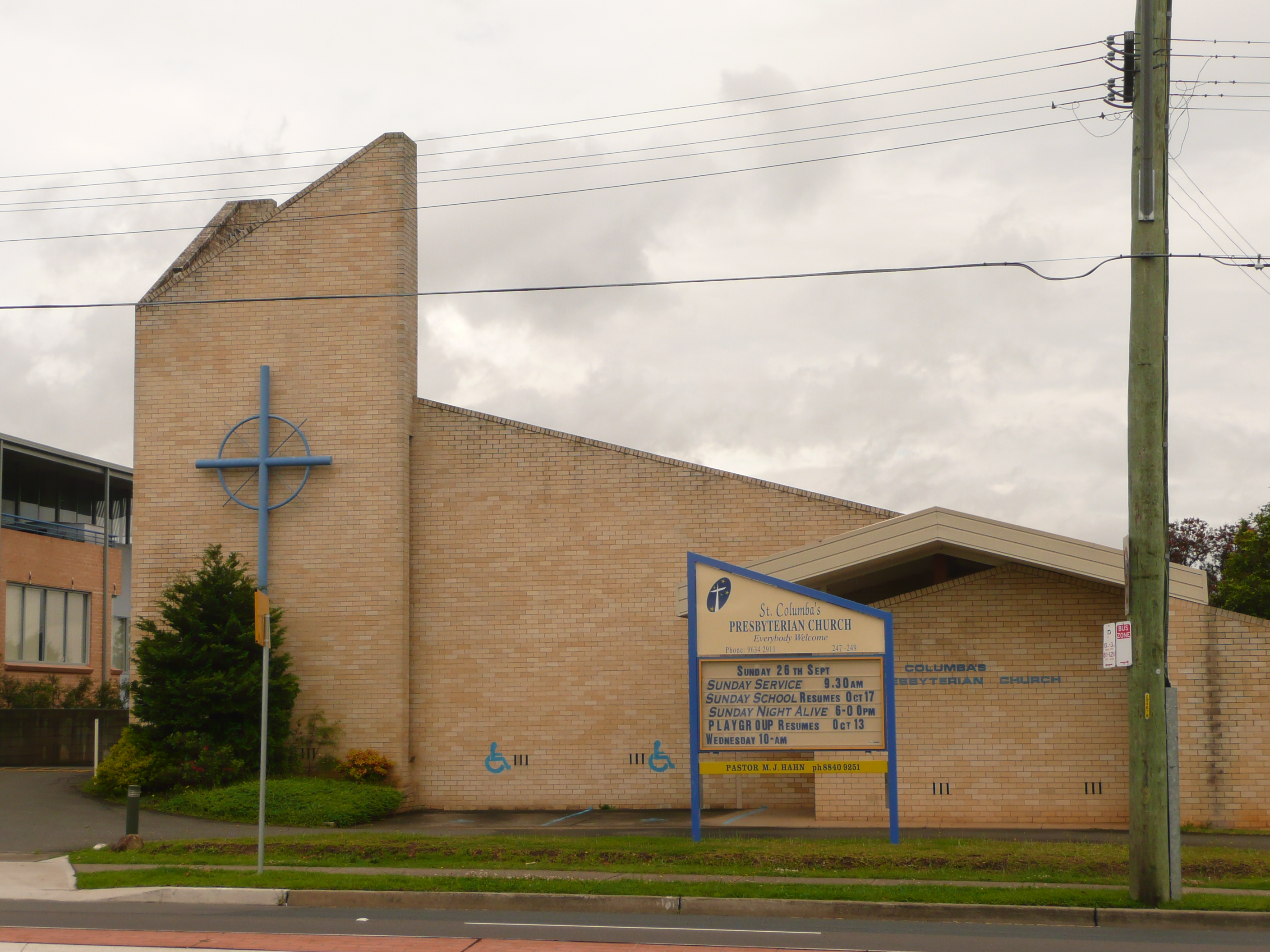
St Columbas Church

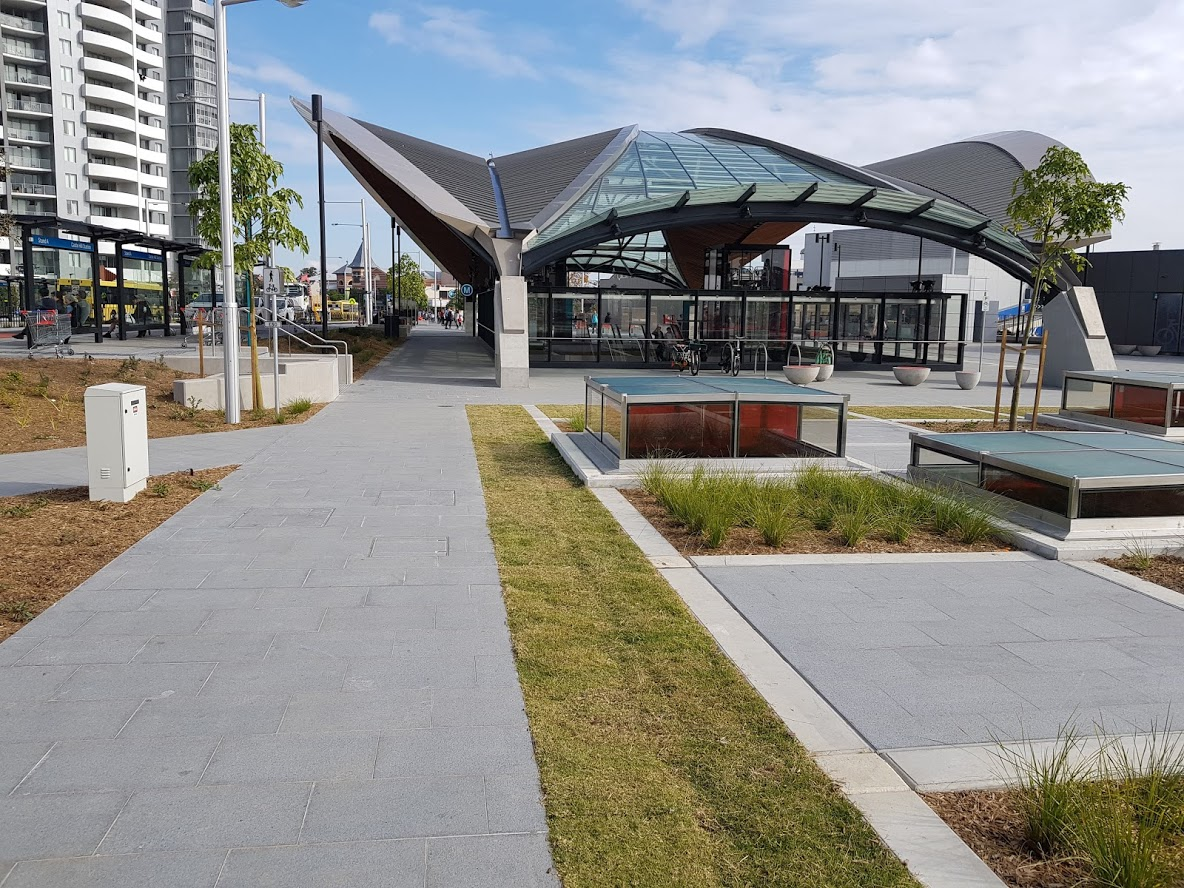
Castle Hill Metro Station
