= Hills Showground metro station =

Sydney Metro railway station

Hills Showground
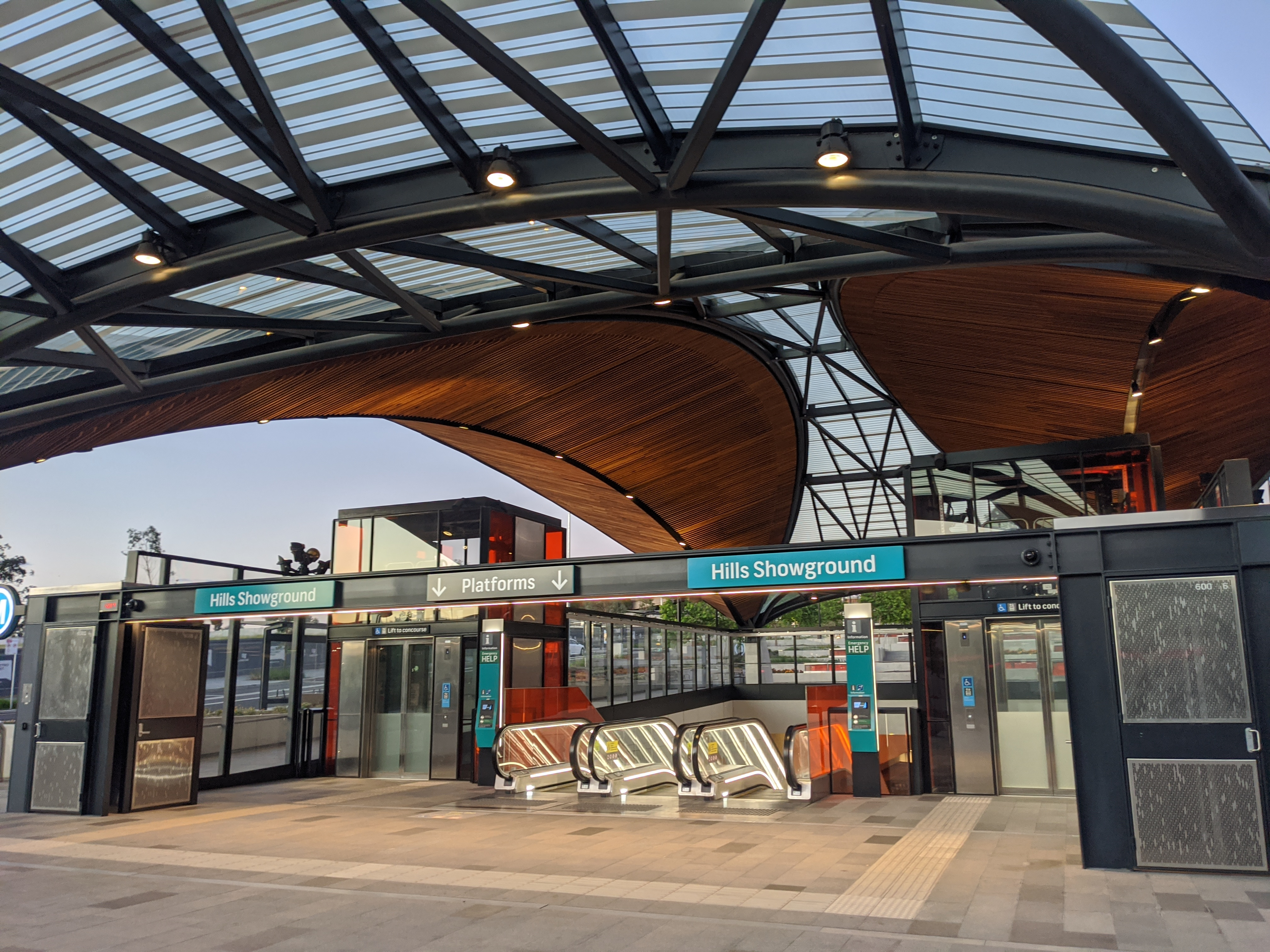
- Doran Drive entrance, April 2020

General information
- Location: Doran Drive, Castle Hill; New South Wales; Australia
- Coordinates: 33°43′41″S 150°59′12″E
- Elevation: 25 m (82 ft) below ground level
- Owner: New South Wales Government via Transport Asset Manager of New South Wales
- Operator: Metro Trains Sydney
- Distance: 23 km from Chatswood
- Platforms: 2
- Train operators: Metro Trains Sydney
- Connections: Bus

Construction
- Structure type: Underground
- Parking: 600 spaces
- Cycle facilities: 40 spaces
- Accessible: Yes

History
- Opened: 26 May 2019
- Former names: Hills Centre; Showground

Passengers
- 2023: 774,500 (year); 2,122 (daily) (Sydney Metro)

Services
Preceding station	Sydney Metro	Following station
Norwest towards Tallawong	M1 Metro North West & Bankstown Line	Castle Hill towards Bankstown
Location

Hills Showground railway station is an underground Sydney Metro station on Doran Drive, in the suburb of Castle Hill, New South Wales, Australia. The station, located near the Castle Hill Showground, serves the Metro North West & Bankstown Line and was built as part of the Sydney Metro Northwest project. The station is planned to eventually serve trains to the Sydney central business district and Bankstown as part of the government's 20-year Sydney's Rail Future strategy. The station opened 26 May 2019. It is currently the least used station on the Sydney Metro.

== History ==
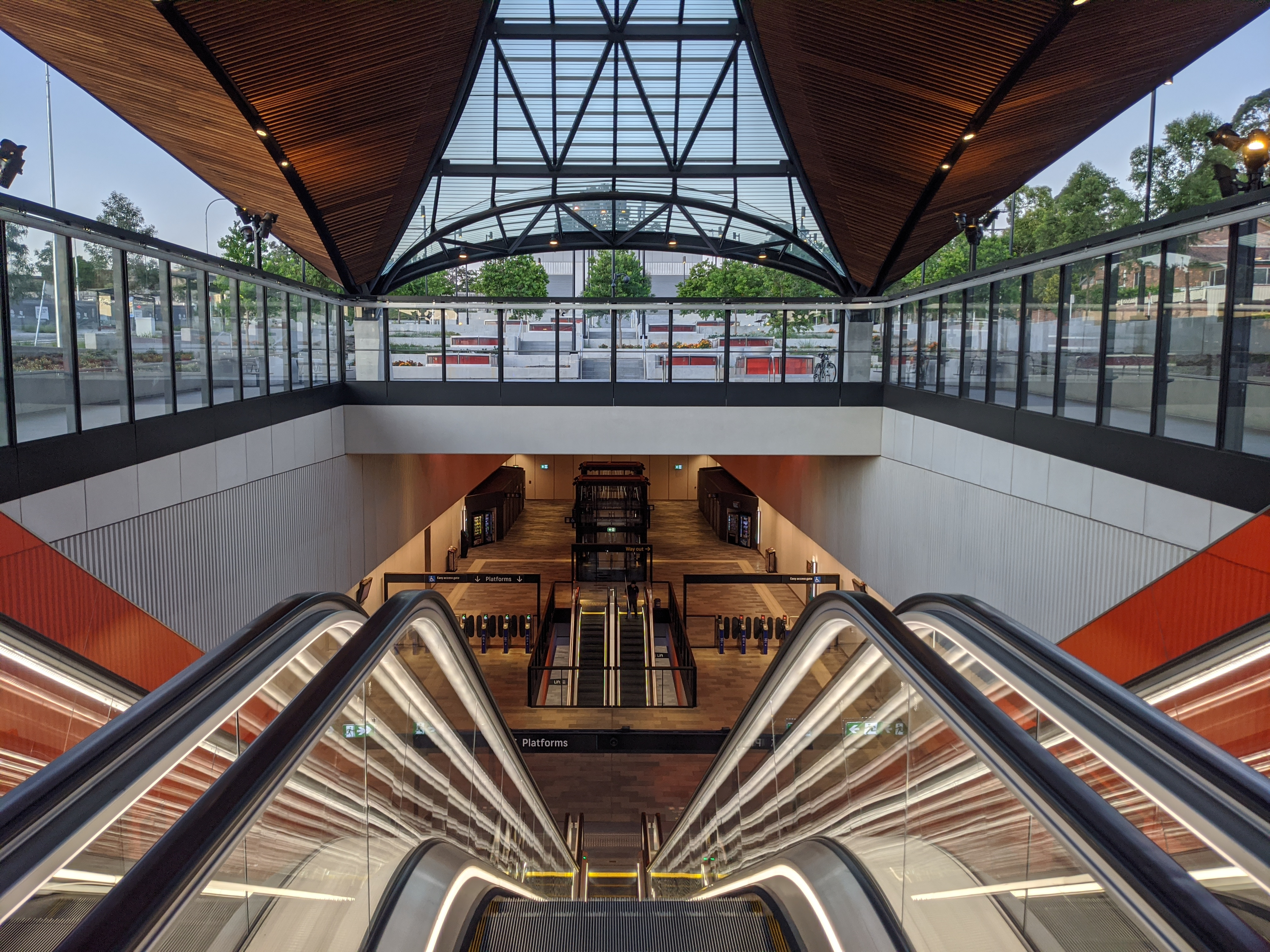
Escalators and concourse

The original plans for the North West Rail Link showed a station called Hills Centre, after the complex of civic buildings of the same name. This was to have been constructed on the site of the Castle Hill Showground. Following community consultation, it was determined that the station would be moved to the Hills Centre site – requiring its demolition – in order to retain the Showground. The station was renamed as a result.

== Services ==
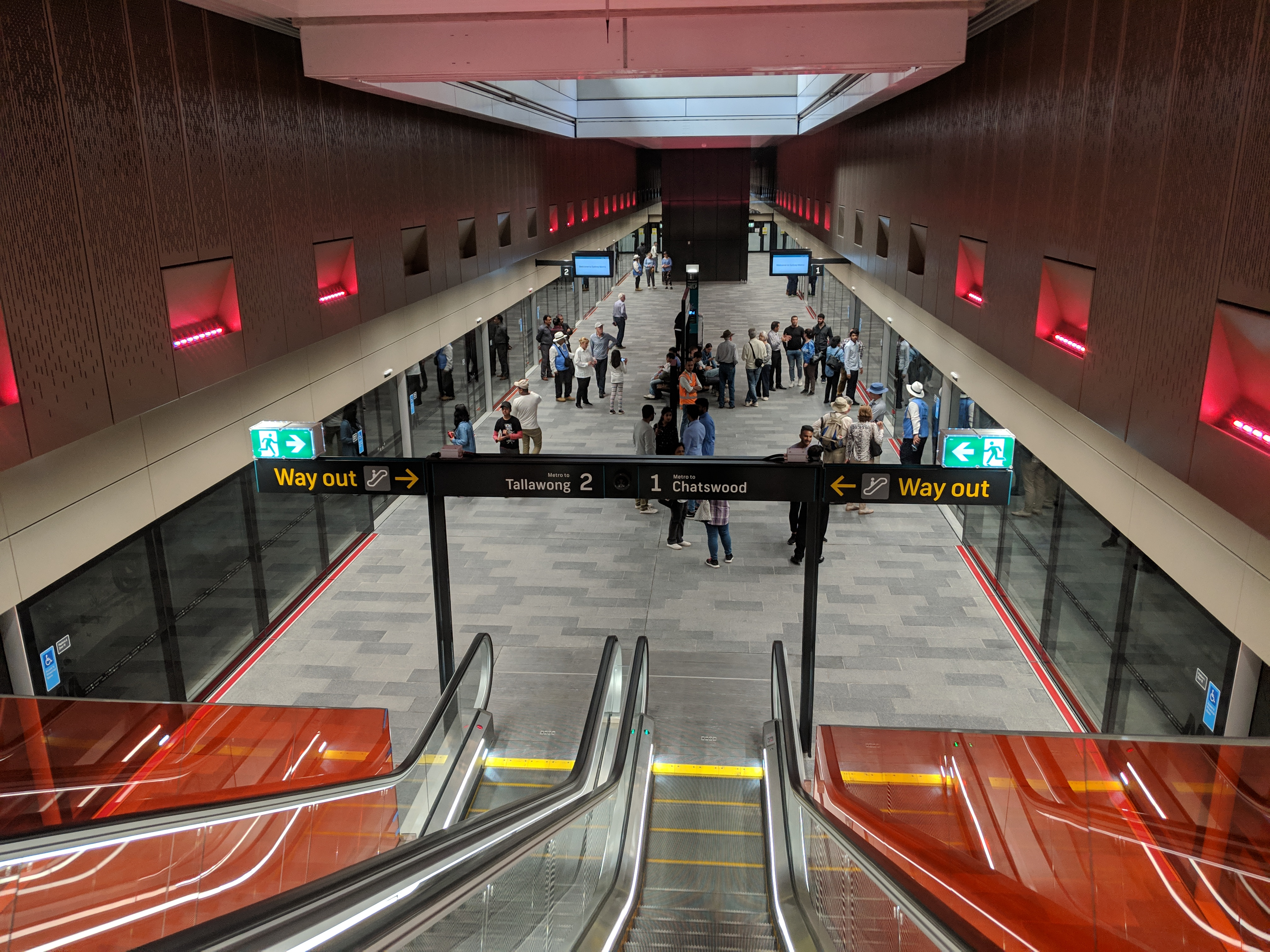
Platforms

Hills Showground has two platforms. It is served by Metro North West & Bankstown Line services. Hills Showground station is served by a number of bus routes operated by Busways and CDC NSW.

Platform	Line	Stopping pattern	Notes
1	M1 Metro North West & Bankstown Line	Services to Bankstown	
2	M1 Metro North West & Bankstown Line	Services to Tallawong	

External image
- Hills Showground Bus Guide by Transport for NSW
