= Castle Hill (radio play) =

1947 Australian radio play

Castle Hill is a 1947 Australian radio play by Madge Parkin about the Castle Hill Rising.

It aired on Lux Radio Theatre as part of a series of Australian written plays.

== Controversy ==
The play was criticised for its depiction of the priest Reverend James Harold. The Advocate wrote "The Lux Radio Theatre has apologised for the play . . . but for one person who reads the apology, there will be a hundred who heard the play and who will have one more stick with which to beat the dirty Irish."
