= St Paul's Anglican Church, Castle Hill =

St Paul's Church
- St Paul's Anglican Church
- St Paul's Church
- 33°43′39″S 151°01′07″E
- Location: 221 Old Northern Road, Castle Hill, Hornsby Shire, New South Wales
- Country: Australia
- Denomination: Anglican
- Website: stpauls.church

History
- Status: Church

Architecture
- Functional status: Active

Administration
- Diocese: Sydney

Clergy
- Archbishop: Kanishka Raffel
- Rector: Rev. Bruce Stanley

St Paul's Church (former)
- St Paul's Anglican Church (former)
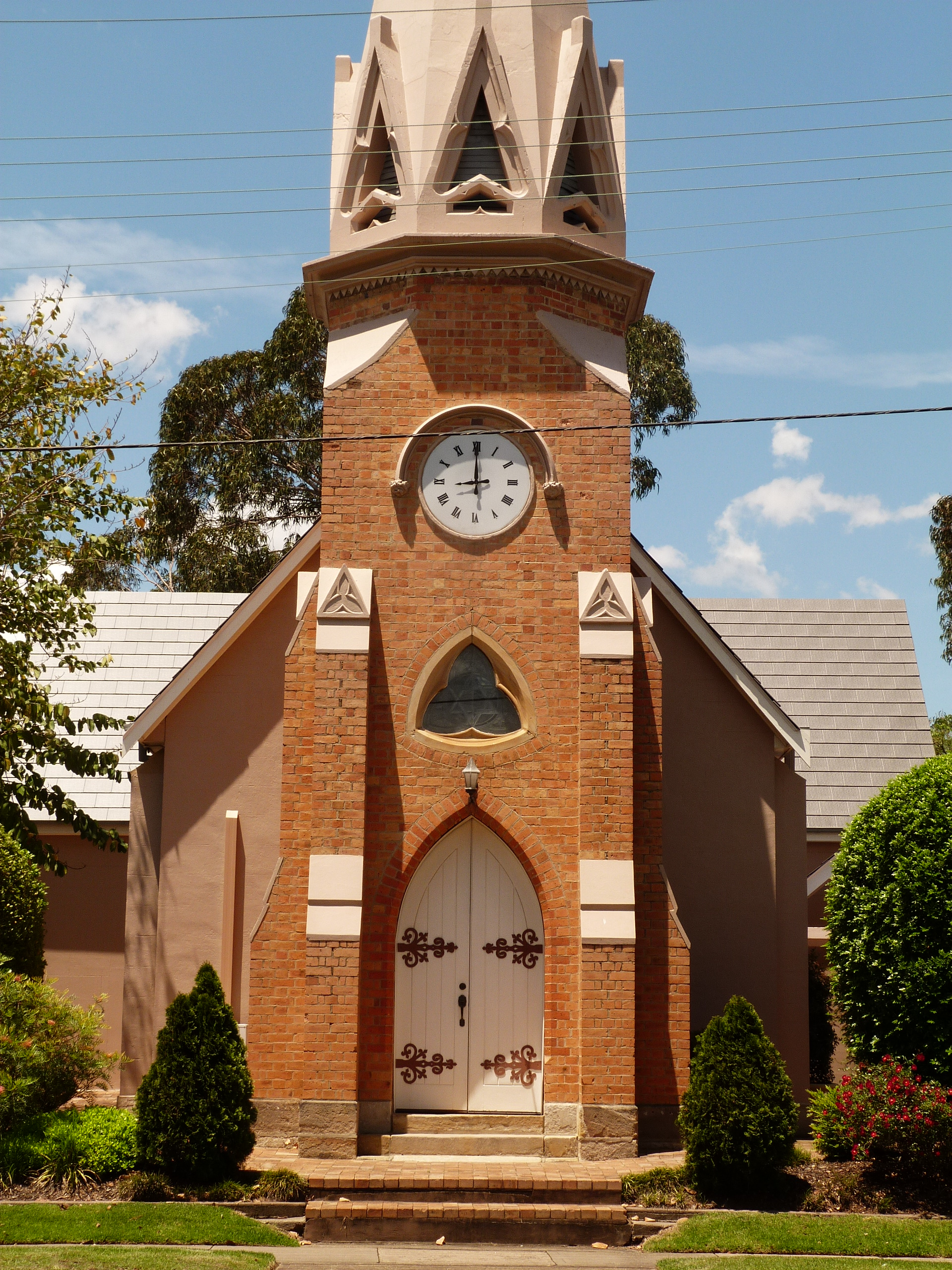
- The entrance to the heritage-listed (former) St Paul's Church, in 2010.

- Location of St Paul's Church in Greater metropolitan Sydney
- 33°44′16″S 151°00′05″E
- Location: 221 Old Northern Road, Castle Hill, The Hills Shire, New South Wales
- Country: Australia
- Denomination: Anglican

History
- Status: Church

Architecture
- Functional status: Preserved

New South Wales Heritage Register
- Official name: St. Paul's Anglican Church (former); St Paul's Church (former)
- Type: State heritage (built)
- Designated: 2 April 1999
- Reference no.: 332
- Type: Church (former)
- Category: Religion

St Paul's Anglican Church is a heritage-listed Anglican former church building located at 221 Old Northern Road, Castle Hill, The Hills Shire, New South Wales, Australia. It is also known as St Paul's Anglican Church (former) and St Paul's Church (former). The former church was added to the New South Wales State Heritage Register on 2 April 1999.

The current St Paul's Anglican Church, a church in the Diocese of Sydney, has been enlarged and relocated to 421 Old Northern Road, Castle Hill.

The music ministry of the church, CityAlight, is known for their modern hymns, including their song "Yet Not I But Through Christ In Me".

== History ==
A church of St Simon was established in the former convict barracks at Castle Hill in 1827. However it closed when a new parish was established in Castle Hill named for St Paul in 1861. The new church building was constructed of brick and was located at 221 Old Northern Road, south of the township, near the corner of Church Street. A sandstone parsonage was constructed opposite the church from materials of the old St Simon's Church. Both buildings remain today and are subject to state and local preservation orders. This church building served the parish until the end of the latter half of the 20th century.

The current larger St Paul's Anglican Church was constructed at Rogans Hill on land owned by the church, adjacent to Oakhill College. The new facilities cater to a congregation of over a 1,000 worshipers. The church is located approximately 35 kilometres (22 mi) north-west of the Sydney central business district.

== Rectors ==
- J Brook and R Barrie circa 1980
- R L Milne and D Eastway, circa 1975
- D Holland, circa 1970.

== Heritage listing ==
The former St Paul's Anglican Church was listed on the New South Wales State Heritage Register on 2 April 1999.

== Gallery ==
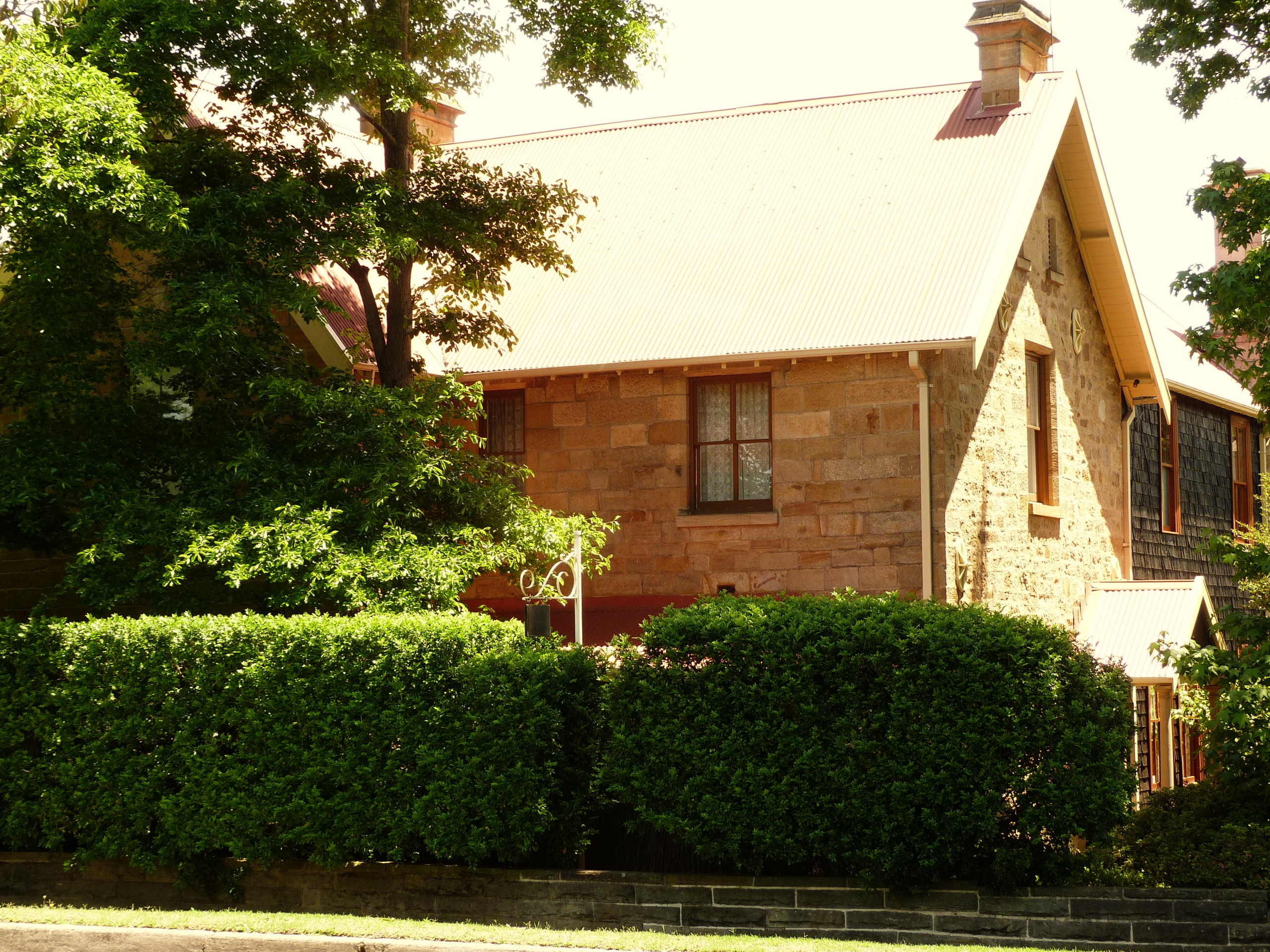
Former parsonage (1866), Parsonage Road

== See also ==
- Australian non-residential architectural styles
- List of Anglican churches in the Diocese of Sydney
