= White Hart (disambiguation) =

White Hart was the personal badge of Richard II.

White Hart may also refer to:

== Hotels and pubs ==
- Great House at Sonning, formerly the White Hart, in Berkshire, England
- White Hart, Bishopsgate, in London, England
- White Hart, Grays, in Essex, England
- White Hart, Lydgate, in Greater Manchester, England
- White Hart, Southwark, formerly in London, England
- White Hart Hotel, Harrogate, in North Yorkshire, England
- White Hart Hotel, New Plymouth, in New Zealand
- White Hart Inn Archaeological Site, in New South Wales, Australia
- White Hart Inn, Blythburgh, in Suffolk, England
- White Hart Inn, Crawley, in West Sussex, England
- White Hart Inn, Hawes, in North Yorkshire, England
- White Hart Inn, Llangybi, in Wales
- The White Hart, South Mimms, in Hertfordshire, England

== Other uses ==
- The White Hart (novel) by Nancy Springer
