= Doll's Hospital =

Former toy shop in London, England

The Doll's Hospital (or Dolls' Hospital) was a toy shop at 16 Dawes Road, Fulham, London that was in operation for over 100 years and repaired dolls sent by postal mail. The business eventually acquired an international reputation for its restoration workshop, including media coverage in the Illustrated Sydney News, "Patients are admitted for broken heads, or fractured limbs, loss of hair, eyes, nose, teeth, fingers, hands, toes, and wasting away of the body. Operations take place every day between 9am and 8pm."

In 1948, the owners of the Doll's Hospital building were victims of the serial killer John Haigh, the so-called Acid Bath Murderer, who was himself hanged the following year.

== History ==
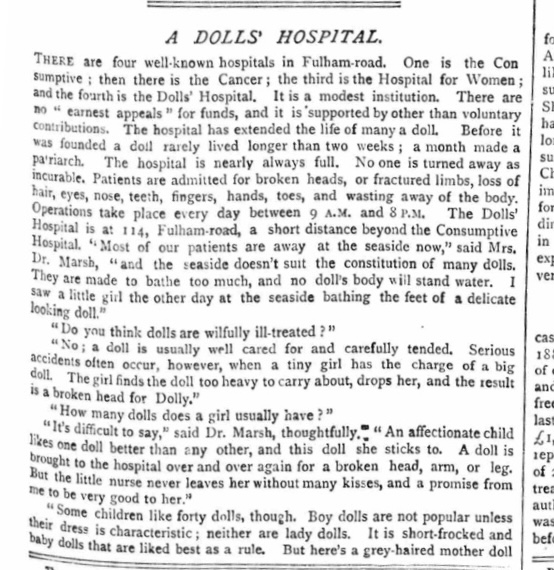
Doll's Hospital on Fulham-Road (Pall Mall Gazette, 1889)

In the 1800s, a "doll's hospital" opened in the nearby Fulham Road. The hospital eventually came into possession of Herbert Wicks. In 1937, the address 16 Dawes Road was listed in the Kelly's Directory as a toy shop associated with toy dealer Albert E. Wickes, son of Herbert Wicks. The younger Wicks ran the hospital from 1930 to 1949.

In April 1937, Dr. Archibald Henderson's first wife died and he inherited more than £20,000. In July 1937, Henderson married Mrs. Rose Erren, who was recently divorced from Rudolf Erren, a German inventor and engineer. Sometime after 1937 the building which housed the toy shop and the Doll's Hospital was bought by Dr. Archibald and Mrs. Rose Henderson. In February 1948, the Hendersons vanished without trace. They had become the penultimate victims of serial killer John Haigh, who was known as the Acid-Bath Murderer because he dissolved the bodies of his victims in concentrated sulphuric acid. Haigh invited them to his basement workshop in Crawley, where he shot them with a revolver stolen from Henderson's own house. With the aid of forged documents, Haigh emptied the couple's bank accounts, and sold their jewellery, car and property. Using a forged deed of transfer, Haigh sold the Doll's Hospital to Albert Clarke. Investigators visited the Doll's Hospital more than once while investigating the murders; for example a March 1949 story in the Portsmouth Evening News read "Detectives At Dolls' Hospital Again...detectives paid another visit to the doll's hospital at Fulham to build up the Yard's rapidly-growing dossier on five missing persons." The person who sold Clarke the business under false pretences (Haigh) was originally described as "Mr. X."

Despite the eventual revelation of the murder of the building owners by an infamous serial killer, the business known as the Doll's Hospital continued. Notable local customers included Janet Street-Porter, who had her only doll repaired there, and others from around the world sent their dolls to be repaired there. In its latter years, the Doll's Hospital was run by John Smith, Clarke's son-in-law, until it closed down sometime after 1989, to be replaced with a non-descript bar.
