= Erren =

Erren may refer to:

== Places ==
- Erren River, river in Taiwan

== People ==
- Rudolf Erren (1899–?), German engineer and inventor
