= White Hart =

Heraldic badge of Richard II of England

White Hart as a Royal Badge of Richard II

The White Hart ("hart" being an archaic word for a mature stag) was the personal badge of Richard II, who probably derived it from the arms of his mother, Joan "The Fair Maid of Kent", heiress of Edmund of Woodstock. It may also have been a pun on his name, as in "Rich-hart". In the Wilton Diptych (National Gallery, London), which is the earliest authentic contemporary portrait of an English king, Richard II wears a gold and enamelled white hart jewel, and even the angels surrounding the Virgin Mary all wear white hart badges. In English Folklore, the white hart is associated with Herne the Hunter.

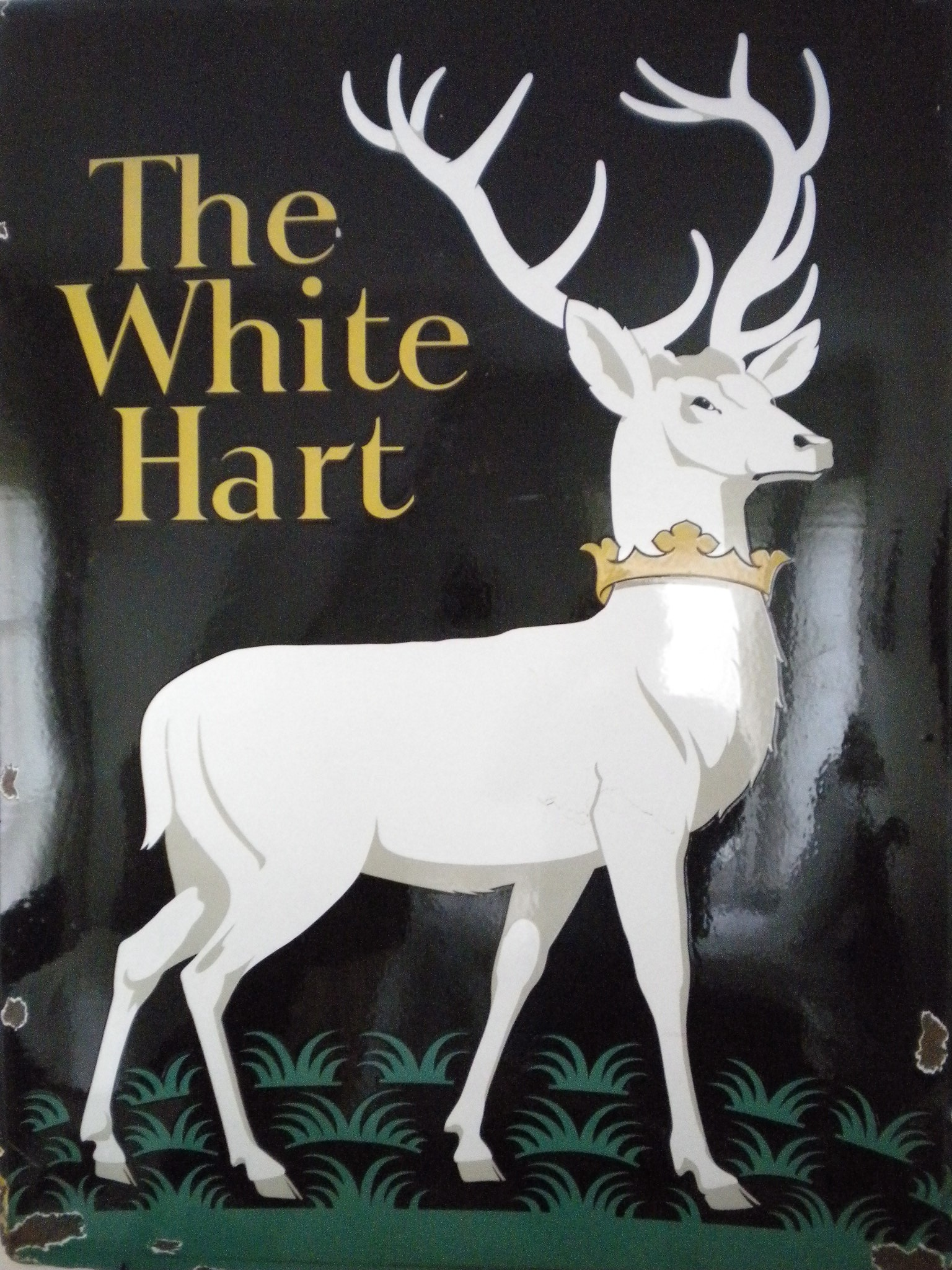
The White Hart pub sign

There are still many inns and pubs in England that sport a sign of the white hart, the fifth most popular name for a pub.

Arthur C. Clarke wrote a collection of science fictional tall tales under the title of Tales from the White Hart, which used as a framing device the conceit that the tales were told during drinking sessions in a pub named the White Hart that existed somewhere between Fleet Street and the Embankment. This pub was fictional but was based on a real pub named the White Horse where the science-fiction community of London met in the 1940s and 1950s.

The Wilton Diptych, showing Richard venerating the Virgin and Child accompanied by an angelic host wearing Richard's white hart badge. National Gallery, London.

== Notable British inns called the White Hart ==
=== Barnes, London ===
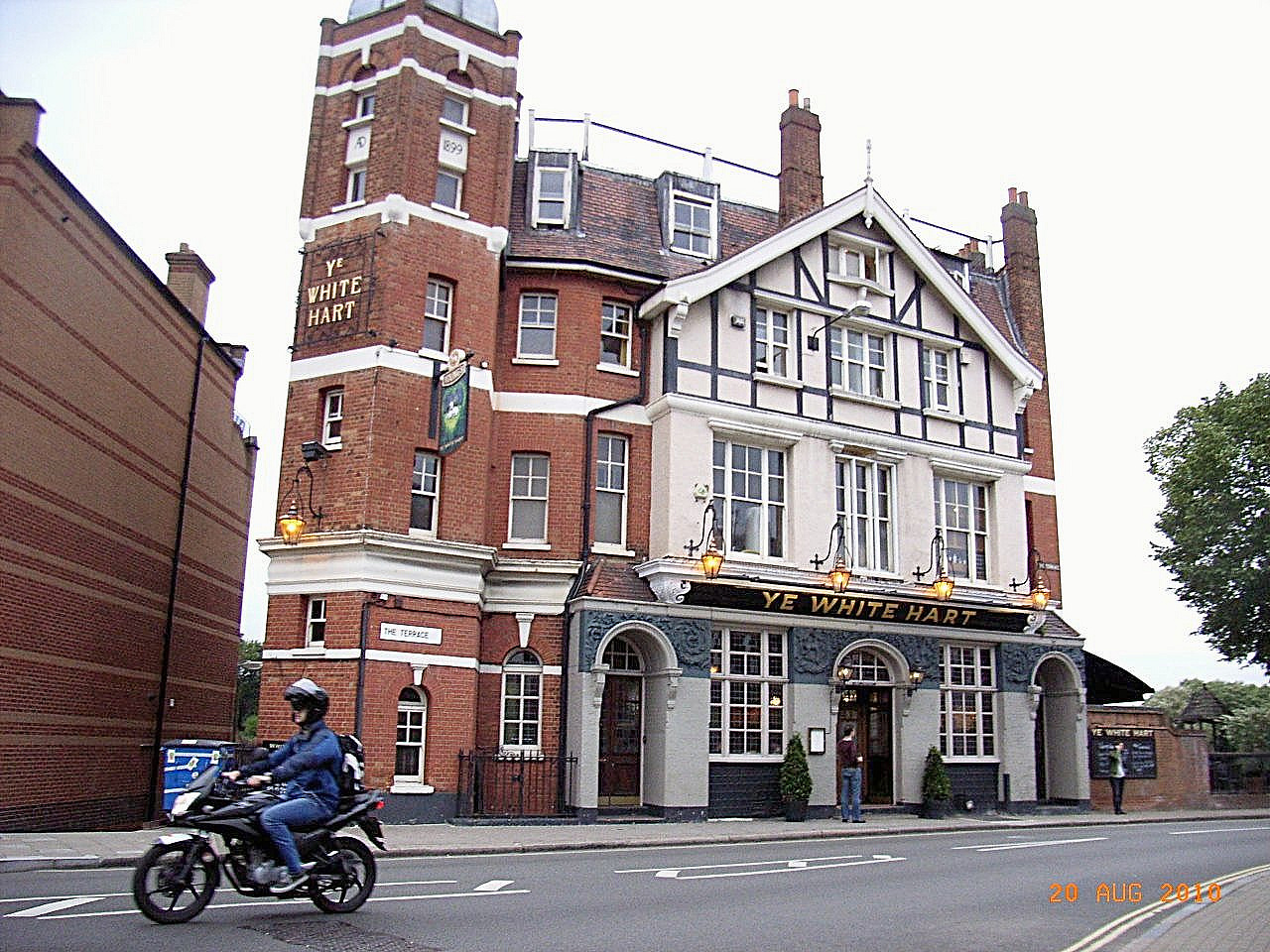
Ye White Hart, Barnes

"Ye White Hart" in Barnes is a Victorian pub which overlooks the Thames and is a prominent landmark on the course of the Boat Race. It served as a headquarters for Barnes Football Club in the mid-nineteenth century.

=== Bletchingley ===
The Whyte Hart Hotel in Bletchingley is said to have been founded in 1388. It was featured in a segment of a Pathé News documentary filmed in 1958 that focused on archaic dishes and methods of food preparation still in use there.

=== Braintree ===
The White Hart Hotel in Braintree dates back as far as the 14th Century in its current guise, and was placed at the crossroad of two Roman roads that form the centre of Braintree town and Bocking. It was a coaching inn that ran services to Sudbury and Norwich daily, up until the arrival of the railway in 1848. It has recently had a renovation by its current owners.

=== Brentwood ===
The White Hart in Brentwood is the oldest pub in the town, dating back to before 1480. It may have been so named after King Richard II passed through Brentwood in 1392, possibly staying at the inn. It became a coaching inn in the 18th century and survived long enough that in 1910 it even offered repairs to motor vehicles. It is now operating as a nightclub and restaurant called Sugar Hut. The building can be seen on reality TV programme, 'The Only Way Is Essex'.

=== Canterbury ===
The facade of The White Hart in Canterbury dates from Victorian times, but is reputed to be built on the site of St Mary de Castro, demolished around 1486, the mortuary of which is now the pub's cellar and still has a body chute. The small park next door, crossed by a diagonal path, is the graveyard, with gravestones lined up against the wall. The pub has a very nice garden, which used to hold bat and trap matches in the summer.

=== Coggeshall ===
Part of a quaint market village on the route between Braintree and Colchester, the White Hart Inn at Coggeshall dates back as far as 1420, and still has many of its original features, notably the timber rooms housing up to 18 beds. There is also a large meeting room available for hire.

=== Colyford ===
The White Hart Inn in Colyford sits on the A3052, which runs along the south coast from Bridport to Exeter.

=== Crawley ===
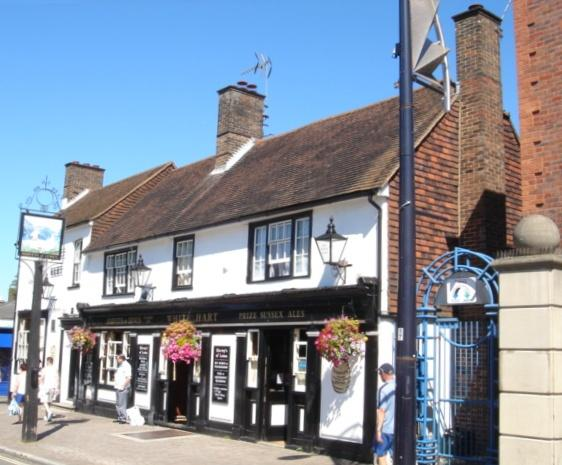
Crawley's White Hart Inn opened in 1770.

Crawley became an important coaching stop on the London to Brighton road after it became fully turnpiked in 1770. By 1668, a mid-15th century Wealden open hall-house which was originally a dwelling had been converted into an inn called The Whyte Harte, later standardised to The White Hart. The great increase in coaching traffic in the late 18th century meant its capacity was often exceeded; so it was sold in 1753 and the proceeds were used to establish a new White Hart Inn nearby. This was built around the core of an early 17th-century timber-framed building, and opened in 1770. As of 2011, it continues to trade under the White Hart name, as a tied house owned by Harveys Brewery.

=== Dartington, Totnes ===
The White Hart is the name of the bar and restaurant within the estate of Dartington Hall, near Totnes in Devon. The medieval Dartington Hall was built for John Holand, Earl of Huntingdon and half-brother to Richard II of England. The Dartington Morris Men side was formed at Dartington Hall in 1968 and was given permission to use the crest of the white hart on a red rose as its emblem.

=== Edinburgh ===
In Edinburgh, "The White Hart" is an inn in the Grassmarket, established early in the 16th century. It stood a few hundred steps from the place where public hangings were held, and was popular among spectators. Robert Burns and William Wordsworth were among its notable visitors, and Burke and Hare found some of the victims of their murder-for-body-parts scheme there.

=== Hampshire ===
There is a string of White Hart pubs along what was one of the old main coaching inn roads from London to Salisbury. These are at: Hook (The White Hart and The Old White Hart), Basingstoke, Worting, Overton, Whitchurch, Andover, Stockbridge, Gosport and Salisbury in east Wiltshire.

=== Henfield ===
The White Hart pub in Henfield, West Sussex was built in 1777, and sits alongside the A2037 road between Worthing and London.

=== Hingham ===
The White Hart in Hingham, Norfolk is a town centre boutique hotel and gastropub.

=== Hull ===
"The Olde White Harte" in Silver Street, Kingston upon Hull, was built c.1660, and remodelled in 1881 as a romantic re-imagining of a 17th-century inn. The exterior is in the Artisan Mannerist style, the interior has extensive wood panelling, including 17th century work; the building is Grade II* listed. Local legend, thought to originate in the 19th century and now considered unlikely to be correct, links the building with Sir John Hotham, and the English Civil War; the wood panelled first floor room known as the "Oak Room" or "Plotting Parlour" is the supposed location where Sir John Hotham and others took the decision to refuse King Charles I entry to the town, precipitating the First Siege of Hull.

"The White Hart" is in Alfred Gelder Street, Kingston upon Hull. It was built in 1904 and frequented by the poet Philip Larkin, who gave a talk to the Jazz Record Society entitled ‘My Life and Death as a Record Reviewer’ here in 1977.

=== Isle of Wight ===
The White Hart in Havenstreet is close to the main centre of the Isle of Wight Steam Railway and has a railway theme.

=== Llangybi ===
The White Hart in Llangybi was first built in the early 16th century and was to become the property of Henry VIII as part of Jane Seymour's wedding dowry, while a century later Oliver Cromwell is reputed to have used it as his headquarters in Monmouthshire during the English Civil War. The interior still retains no fewer than 11 fireplaces from the 17th century, a wealth of exposed beams, original Tudor period plasterwork and even a priest hole.

For years, students of English literature were mystified by a couple of lines in the poem 'Usk' written by T.S. Eliot. In 2003, The Guardian reported that T. S. Eliot made cryptic reference to this pub in his poem "Usk", referring not to an animal but to The White Hart Village Inn. Touring Wales in 1935, the poet had visited the old hostelry which does indeed stand near the village well, once painted white and now in ruins.

=== London (Drury Lane) ===
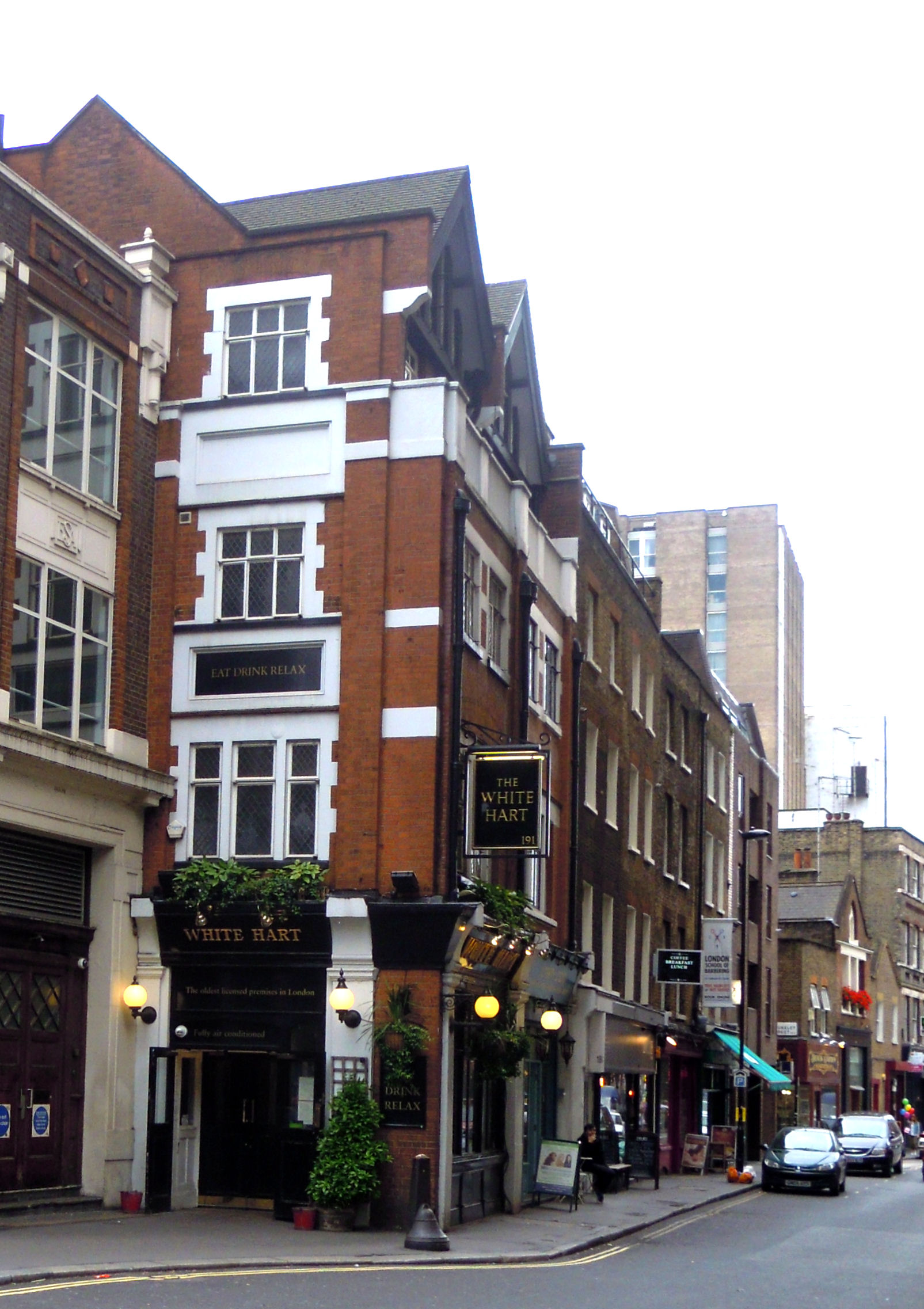
The White Hart on Drury Lane in London (2017)

The White Hart at 191 Drury Lane, one of central London's best-known streets, has existed since the 15th century.

=== Mitcham, London ===
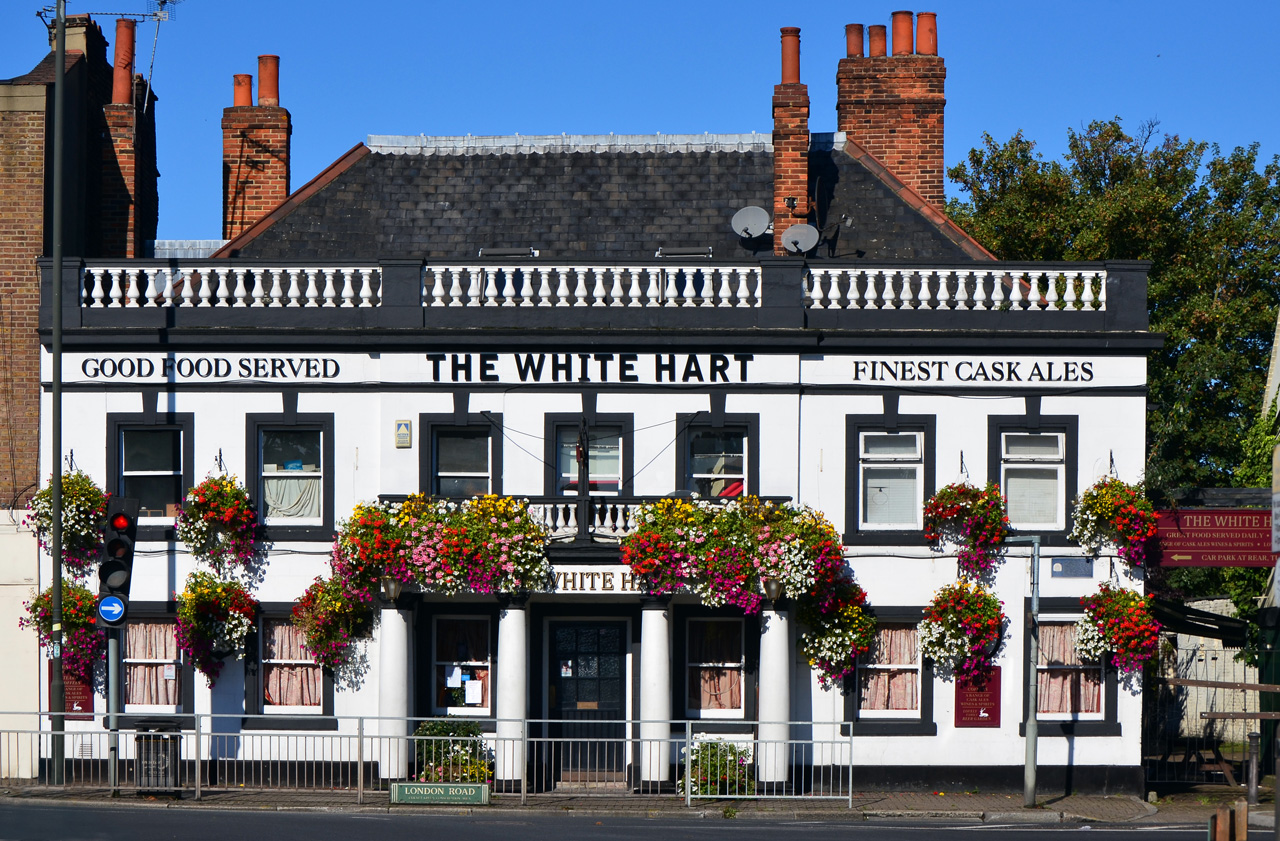
The White Hart, Mitcham, London

The White Hart, Mitcham is a currently closed, listed 18th-century building situated near Mitcham Cricket Green. It is Mitcham's earliest recorded inn, rebuilt in 1749–50 after fire damage. The central porch, with frieze and balustrade, is supported by four Tuscan columns. Stagecoaches used to start from a yard at the rear. It is Grade II listed. It is located in London Road.

=== Ringwood ===
The White Hart at Ringwood in the New Forest is said to have been the first pub so named, after King Henry VII caught such a beast nearby, had it leashed and led it back to the town in triumph, a legend with the flavour of political allegory.

=== Rowen, Conwy ===
White Hart Road is the name given to a section of hill land road enclosed from common land in the parish of Caerhun high above the village of Rowen, in the Conwy Valley. It was planned as a new part of the Royal Mail coach road from Llanbedr y Cennin to Abergwyngregyn before the A55 coast road was built linking Chester to Holyhead around Penmaenmawr. The enclosure award still shows the name White Hart, which is very unusual for a road name rather than inns.

=== Shifnal, Shropshire ===
The White Hart in Shifnal is a timber-farmed building has been dated back to the 18th century, with later additions. It was named CAMRA Telford Pub of the Year 2017, 2018 and 2019.

=== Sherborne, Dorset ===
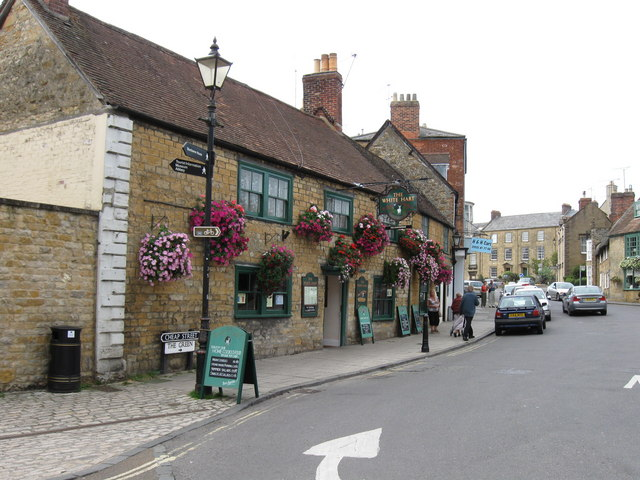
The White Hart Pub. Sherborne - geograph.org.uk - 1502034

There is a long-established pub called the White Hart on the high street in Sherborne.

=== Sonning-on-Thames ===
The Great House at Sonning in Sonning, Berkshire, on the banks of the River Thames, was formerly known as the White Hart because Richard II's wife, Isabella of Valois was kept prisoner in the village after his death.

=== South Mimms ===
The White Hart, South Mimms in Hertfordshire is a Grade II listed pub built in the late 17th century or early 18th century.

=== Southwark, London ===
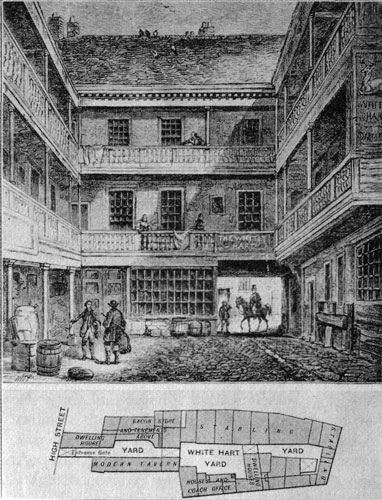
The White Hart, Southwark

An inn at the sign of the "White Hart" was established in the medieval period on Borough High Street in Southwark, immediately south of London Bridge. It is mentioned by William Shakespeare in Henry VI, Part 2 as the headquarters of the rebels in Jack Cade's 1450 Kentish rebellion. Louis L'Amour mentions the Southwark White Hart in "Sackett's Land", an historical fiction taking place circa 1600. It became one of the many famous coaching inns in the days of Charles Dickens, and it was here that Sam Weller met Mr. Pickwick in the famous scene from The Pickwick Papers, chapter 10. The Inn was pulled down in the 19th century. It was next door to The George Inn and near the site of The Tabard.

Also in Southwark, but approximately 0.5 km to the west, the White Hart at 22 Great Suffolk Street was built in 1882. It survived redevelopment of the surrounding area and is now the only Victorian public house on that street.

=== St Albans ===
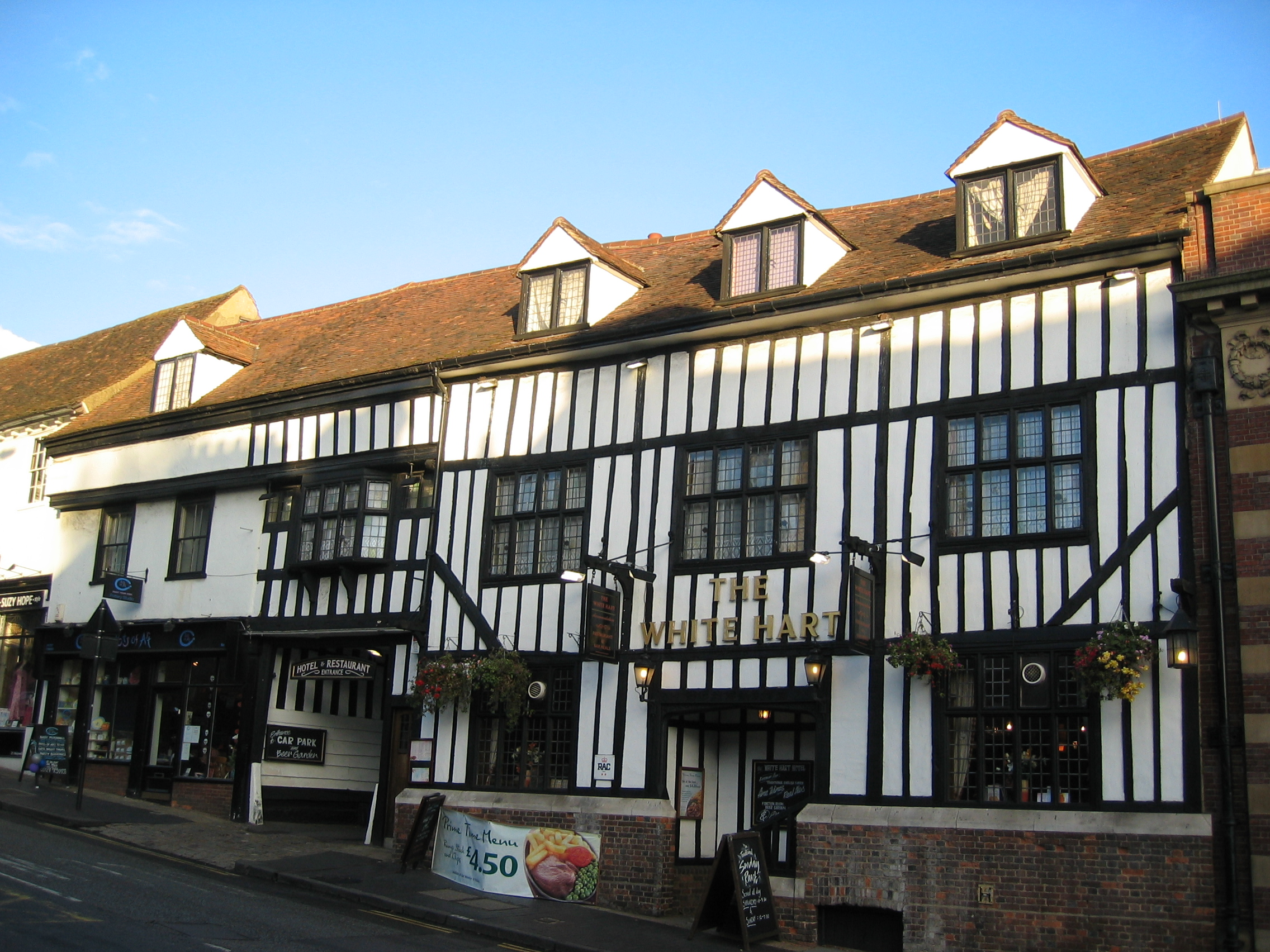
The White Hart, St Albans

The "White Hart" in St Albans is a former coaching inn and a Grade II* listed building, built in around 1500. It is listed in CAMRA's Register of Historic Pub Interiors.

=== St Keverne ===
The "White Hart" in St Keverne, Cornwall was the birthplace, in 1764, of the singer and actor Charles Incledon.

=== Thatcham, Berkshire ===
The White Hart in Thatcham is mentioned in Coaching Days and Coaching Ways (1888) by W. Outram Tristram.

=== Wilmington ===
The White Hart in Wilmington, East Devon is on the A35 road between Honiton and Axminster, where there also was a White Hart attested in the nineteenth century.

=== Witham ===
The White Hart Inn in Witham, Essex, is situated in the north centre of the town, and has been situated there since the late 13th Century. Based at the top of Newland Street, it sits pretty as one of the many old buildings in the town, and has since 2006 been refurbished to an authentic state that it was originally in.

=== Witley ===
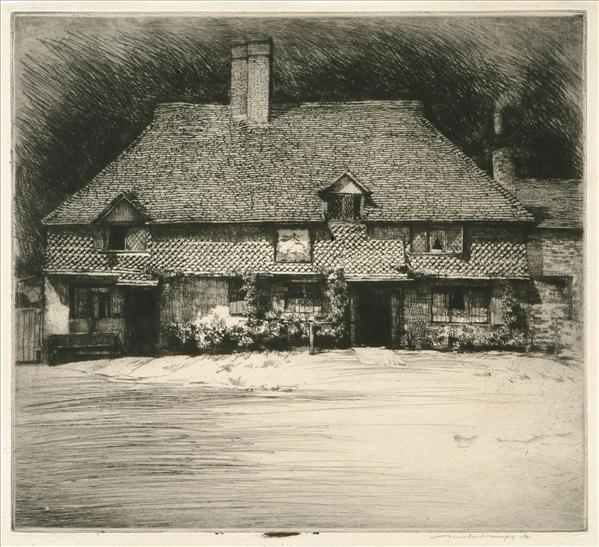
Mortimer Menpes, "The White Hart, Witley"

The White Hart, the village pub in Witley, Surrey, is mostly Elizabethan and is said to stand on the site of an Anglo-Saxon inn. It is reputed to have one of the oldest continuous licences of any pub in England. Myles Birket Foster painted the picture-board for it in around 1875; this is now in the Victoria and Albert museum in London.

== American inns ==
=== Salisbury, Connecticut ===
The White Hart Inn in Salisbury, Connecticut is named after one of the Hampshire taverns of the same name. It has operated as a post-road inn since 1867, though its physical structure dates back to 1806, when part of the current building was constructed as a private residence. It has a dining room, a pub, and numerous guest rooms and suites in the main building and in the adjoining Gideon Smith House. It was reported that the White Hart Inn in Salisbury had closed and was for sale as of November 2010. In May 2014, the Inn was sold for $2.9 million to an investor group led by Thomas Conley Rollins Jr., a New York investment banker who has a home in nearby Sharon. The group reopened the property in 2014. The property features 16 guest rooms, three dining rooms, a taproom with a full-service bar, two outdoor dining patios, a large porch with drink service, a ballroom and café. The artwork of Jasper Johns, Frank Stella, Terry Winters, Donald Baechler, Hugo Guinness and Duncan Hannah is displayed throughout the premises.

== See also ==
- Heart (band), originally called White Hart
- White stag
- White boar
