= The George Hotel, Crawley =

Hotel and former coaching inn in West Sussex, England

The George Hotel
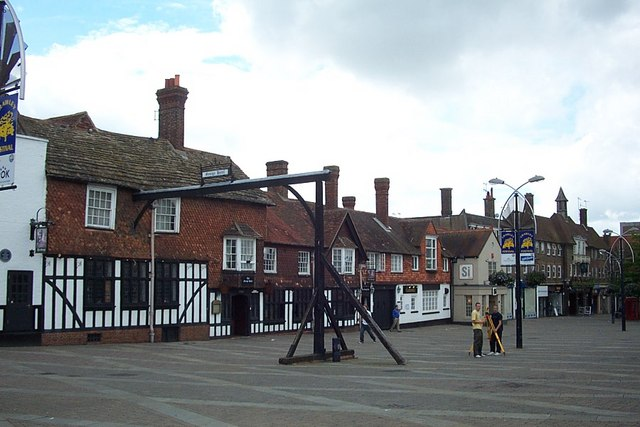
- The George Hotel in 2007

- Location within Crawley
- Alternative names: The George Inn; Ramada Crawley Gatwick

General information
- Location: Crawley, West Sussex, England
- Coordinates: 51°6′53″N 0°11′28″W
- Year built: Late 15th or early 16th century
- Renovated: 18th and early 19th centuries (extended and altered)

Listed Building – Grade II*
- Official name: The George Hotel
- Designated: 21 June 1948
- Reference no.: 1187088

The George Hotel, also known as the George Inn and now marketed as the Ramada Crawley Gatwick, is a hotel and former coaching inn on the High Street in Crawley, a town and borough in West Sussex, England. The George was one of the country's most famous and successful coaching inns, and the most important in Sussex, because of its location halfway between the capital city, London, and the fashionable seaside resort of Brighton. Cited as "Crawley's most celebrated building", it has Grade II* listed building status.

It is known that a building called the George has existed on the site since the 16th century or earlier, and many sources date the core of the existing inn to 1615. The George Hotel has three principal sections, facing east and running from south to north parallel with Crawley High Street. Nothing of the exterior is original, except perhaps for parts of the tiled roof. The hotel contains 84 rooms and six meeting rooms with a capacity of up to 150, regularly used for conferences, weddings, exhibitions, seminars and training sessions. The present structure is made up of disparate parts of various dates: the inn expanded to take in adjacent buildings as its success grew in the 18th and 19th centuries. Major changes took place in the 1930s, and the annex was knocked down in 1933.

The inn has been associated with royalty, bareknuckle prizefighting, smuggling among other things, and has been the subject of novels and paintings. It was central to the plot of Sir Arthur Conan Doyle's mystery novel Rodney Stone, written in 1896. John George Haigh, a notorious serial killer in the 1940s known for his "acid bath" murders, stayed at the hotel on numerous occasions, and dined there on the day he killed one of his victims. The hotel is also reputedly haunted by the ghost of a nightwatchman, Mark Hurston (or Hewton) and other curious figures.

== History ==
=== Medieval history ===
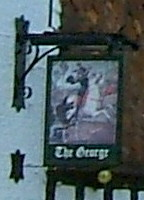
The George logo

At the time of the Domesday survey in 1086 there was no manor or village of Crawley, but the thickly forested area was gradually being cleared and settled. The land on which the village of Crawley developed—a sloping site with higher land to the south, at the point where the Low Weald rises to become the High Weald—was probably owned by William de Warenne, 1st Earl of Surrey as part of one of the manors to the south.

During the Norman era in the late 11th and 12th centuries, a nucleated village began to appear, prompted by the development of a north–south "High Street" forming part of a longer route from the capital city, London, to the port of Shoreham on the English Channel coast. This replaced an earlier northeast–southwest route linking local farms to the older settlement of West Green, about 0.5 miles (0.8 km) west of Crawley, because a north–south route could take advantage of an area of drier, harder land formed by an outcrop of sandstone from the Hastings Beds that jutted into the sticky, waterlogged Weald Clay, which predominated around West Green and Crawley.

The main road quickly became established, and Crawley was a natural stopping place almost exactly halfway between the coast and London. Its development into an urban area was assured when King John granted a charter for a market in 1202. St John the Baptist's Church was founded a few decades later, a manor house was built in the late 14th or early 15th century, and the local iron industry brought further prosperity. Buildings appeared on both sides of the High Street, which widened significantly as it passed the manor house and church, and the market's position on a long-distance through road enabled it to thrive.

=== 16th–17th century ===
The first mention of The George appears in 1579, when landowner Richard Covert died and passed on an area of land (a tenement) to his son. This necessitated a payment to the Lord of the manor. The tenement bore the name of The George, and was situated in a valuable position: in the centre of Crawley, on the west side of the High Street (and just inside the parish of Ifield, a nearby village; the boundary between Ifield and Crawley parishes ran along the middle of the High Street). The building on the land was almost certainly an inn at that time, and many sources assert that its oldest parts date from about 1450. Its centre section, an open hall-house of a type common in the area, may be even older, possibly late 14th-century.

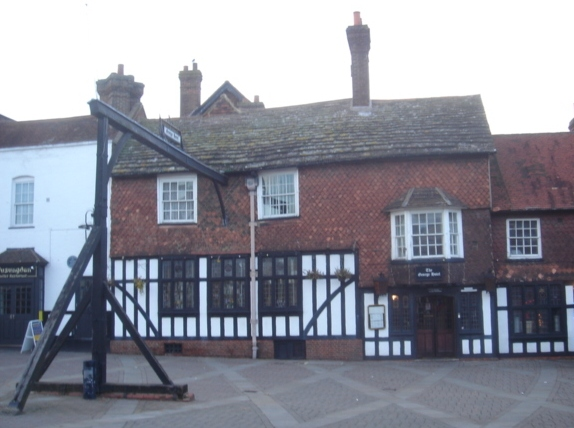
The exterior, showing the replica gallows

An early remodelling came in 1615, when a timber-framed extension was built on the south side, a new jettied cross-wing was added at the front and a stone fireplace was installed. This bears the date 1615 (although this may have been carved later), and has carvings and arches. An inventory dated 1689, carried out when the owner died, revealed that the George Hotel had 15 bedrooms, two parlours, a kitchen, a bakery, a small brewery, stables, a barn, a back yard and a cellar. Meanwhile, a gallows was erected outside the hotel, partly spanning the High Street; one end was attached to the top floor of the building.

Until the 18th century, the narrow, waterlogged road northwards from Crawley towards Reigate and London could only be used by horses, and even then only with difficulty; it was impassable for carriages, carts and other wheeled vehicles. Trade was being affected, demand for travel between Crawley and London was growing (by the late 17th century it was one of several towns in Sussex to be served by scheduled packhorse-drawn goods wagons to and from the capital), and the nearby market towns of Horsham and East Grinstead threatened to overtake Crawley in importance. (Like Crawley, they each had two licensed taverns in 1636, when an inventory of Sussex's 61 licensed premises was drawn up.) In 1696 one of England's first turnpike Acts was passed, which allowed tolls to be collected to pay for repairs and improvement. A tollgate was built at the north end of Crawley, which gave its name to the present neighbourhood of Northgate.

=== 18th–19th century ===
The growth of Brighton as a fashionable seaside resort from the mid-18th century was also invaluable to Crawley's prosperity: it lay directly south of Crawley, and replaced Shoreham as the main focus of north–south traffic. In 1770 the section between Lowfield Heath (north of Crawley) and Brighton was turnpiked, and for the first time the full length of the London–Brighton road was properly constructed and maintained. The journey by horse and carriage now took about eight hours, and Crawley was perfectly placed to become a daytime or overnight stopping point. Within a few years, about 60 coaches were making the journey every day, and The George—as the town's largest and best-equipped hotel—became "the recognised halfway house between London and Brighton".

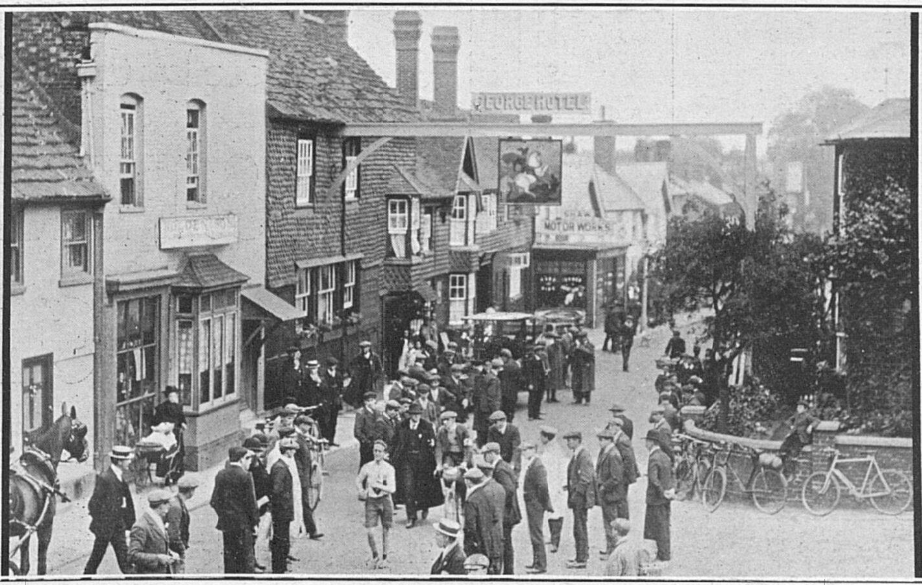
Tom Payne of North Shields Polytechnic passing the George Hotel, Crawley, during the London to Brighton walk in September 1909

Artist Thomas Rowlandson's aquatint of 1789, An Excursion to Brighthelmstone in 1789 (the title uses Brighton's original name), shows The George Hotel prominently. It is the earliest artistic depiction of Crawley, and shows a riotous horse auction underneath the original gallows. The horses were reputedly seized from smugglers apprehended in the area, which was notorious for that activity at the time. Bareknuckle prizefighting was also a major local attraction from which The George benefited: nearby Crawley Down and Copthorne were "the most renowned battlefields in the south of England", and The George itself became "the hub of the pugilistic universe". Tens of thousands of people of all classes—including members of the royal family (such as the Prince Regent), statesmen and famous playwrights—would visit Crawley Down or Copthorne Common to watch and bet on extremely violent contests which could last for hours; the George was invariably used as the base from which to visit these illegal bouts. Other famous visitors of this era included Lord Nelson—whose sister lived in the nearby village of Handcross— Queen Victoria, who on one occasion was stranded overnight when her carriage broke down, and the Prince Regent, whose patronage of Brighton and regular travelling of the London–Brighton road indirectly brought about the upturn in fortunes experienced by Crawley in general, and the George Hotel in particular, during the 18th century. In this era, it was one of Britain's best-known and most important coaching inns, and it held "the premier position" among Sussex's many such establishments.

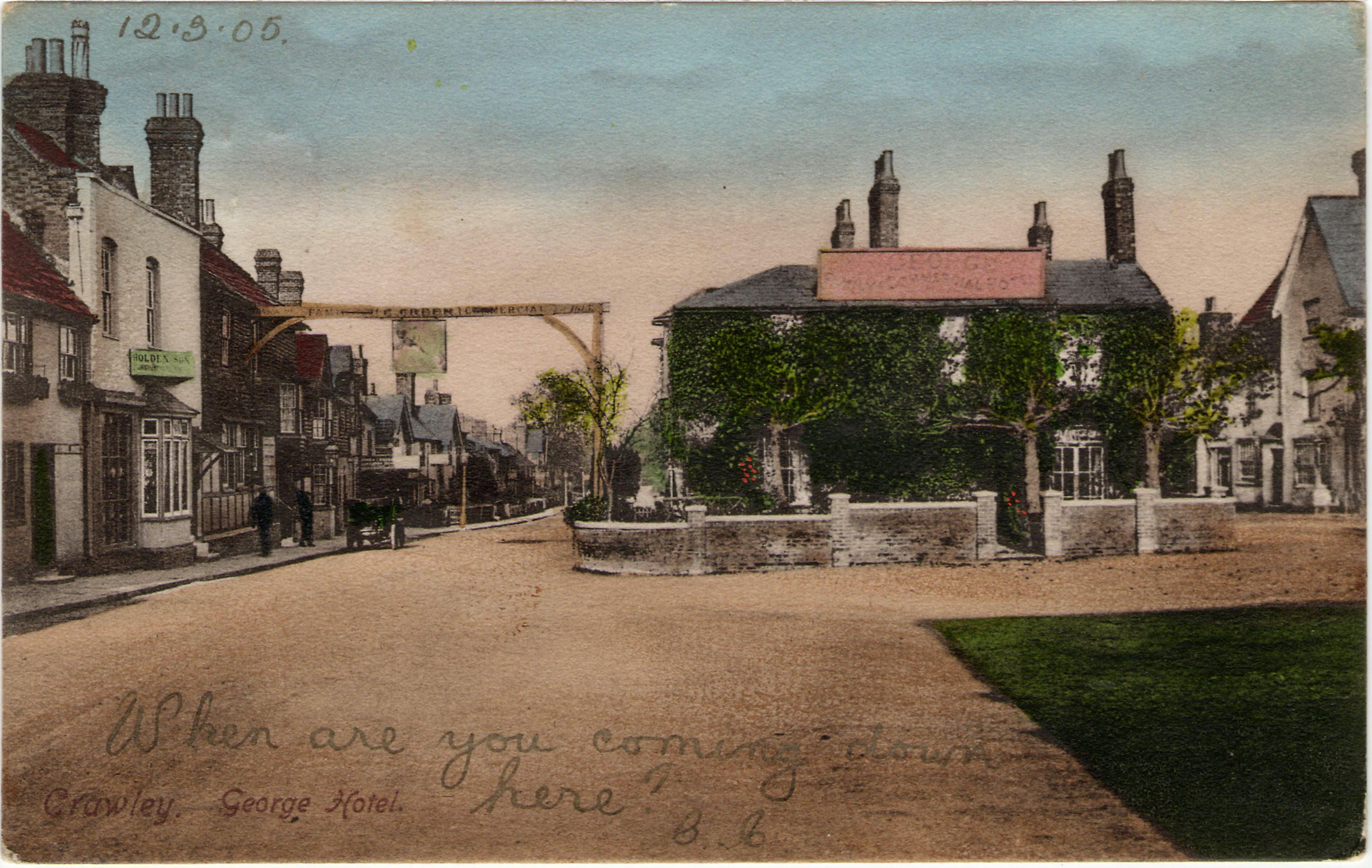
The annexe (centre-right), demolished in the 1930s

Also by this time, the former gallows had been converted into an inn sign that soon became a landmark, and some structural and exterior alterations were made—the first of many over the subsequent years. The earliest known photograph of the George, dated 1867, shows a dilapidated building of several uncoordinated parts: it had expanded over the years to take in buildings on each side of the original medieval inn, and it was considered a purely functional building with no obvious architectural merit. By this time, the coaching era was in terminal decline because of the increasing popularity of rail travel; a line was opened between London and Brighton in 1841, with a station at Three Bridges just east of Crawley, and the town centre received its own branch line and station in 1848. Despite this, Crawley High Street remained busy as the town continued to grow, and The George underwent more renovation and was extended further. In particular, an old (possibly 18th-century) free-standing building which stood in the middle of the wide High Street, and which was once used as a candle factory, was acquired by the George's owners and became an annex. It was this building, rather than the main part of the hotel, which accommodated Queen Victoria when she was forced to stay overnight. Cycling for leisure purposes became a fad in the late 19th century, and the London–Brighton road was a popular route; the George became a regular stopping point for groups of cyclists.

=== 20th century–present ===
Major changes took place in the 1930s. The annex was knocked down in 1933, and the site in the middle of the High Street was converted into a bus stop and a car park for the hotel (itself removed since the street's pedestrianisation in the early 21st century). The gallows sign was replaced with a replica, and two smaller facsimiles were added in the car park, which was also flanked by four medieval-style lanterns. Meanwhile, wide-ranging renovations to the hotel itself made the building look even older than it did before; all structural changes took its medieval character into account and were made in a complementary style, making all the disparate parts of the hotel "look an integrated whole".

Soon after World War II, Crawley was designated as England's second New Town by the Labour government of Clement Attlee, who passed the New Towns Act 1946. Housing, industry and offices developed rapidly around the core of the old town; despite early fears that historic buildings (including The George Hotel) would have to be destroyed, most of the historic High Street was preserved. The growth of nearby Gatwick Airport from a little-used airstrip into an international airport provided further impetus, and by the start of the 21st century Crawley had become a regional centre with 100,000 people—compared to a population of about 7,000 before World War II. Demand for hotel space grew continuously, and The George was extended to the rear and began marketing itself as the Gatwick George Hotel. As of 2014 it is branded Ramada Crawley Gatwick.

The George Hotel was Grade II* listed by English Heritage on 21 June 1948. Such buildings are defined as "particularly important" and "of more than special interest". As of August 2013, it was one of 12 Grade II* structures, and 100 listed buildings and structures of all grades, in the Borough of Crawley. Since the New Town was established, Crawley has been split into 13 neighbourhoods, and all listed buildings in the borough are described on the council's schedule of listed buildings as being in one of these neighbourhoods; the George Hotel is classed as being in West Green, and is one of six listed buildings in that neighbourhood.

== Architecture ==
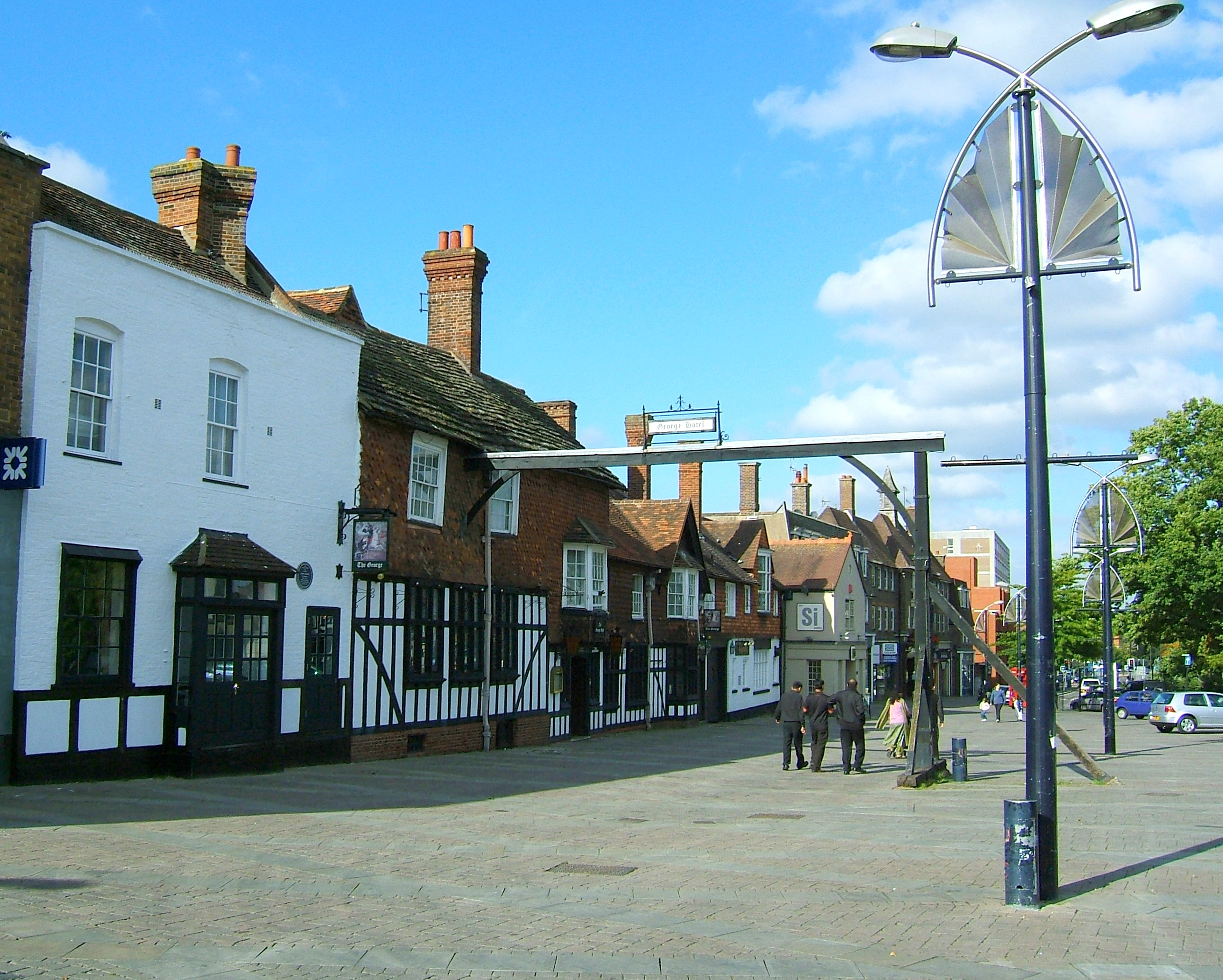
The George Hotel

The George Hotel has three principal sections, facing east and running from south to north parallel with Crawley High Street. Despite uncertainty over its early history, the building is generally agreed to have 15th-century origins, which are most evident in the northernmost bay. This section has a much lower roofline than the rest of the hotel, although the whole building is two-storey. The northern section is believed to have been a two-bay open hall-house with a parlour wing; their thick wooden roof beams (in the form of crown posts), blackened by smoke, and timber-framed walls survive. The centre section was the south wing of the original building; it would have been the service area to the hall-house, with kitchen facilities and similar, and formed a cross-wing with large joists and a cellar. The rear wall has braces which suggest the former existence of a rear entrance leading to the stables behind. A stone fireplace inside may be as old as the date carved on it—1615—but the inscription is believed to be more recent.

None of the exterior is original, although parts of the tiled roof may be. It is laid with slabs of Horsham stone—a local material commonly used on old roofs in the Crawley area. The façade is mostly tile-hung to the first floor with timber framing below. The entrance is gabled and has a canted bay window of 18th-century origin. The southern part of the façade is stuccoed and topped by a parapet. It is probably an 18th-century refacing of an older building (or buildings) incorporated into the hotel as it grew.

The hotel, now known as Ramada Crawley Gatwick, has 84 rooms, including singles, doubles, twin rooms, family rooms and four-bed rooms. Its six meeting rooms, with a capacity of up to 150, are regularly used for conferences, weddings, exhibitions, seminars and training sessions. There is also a Thai restaurant, a Chinese buffet and a Roman Empire-themed cocktail bar.

== Notable associations ==
Mark Lemon, the first editor of the satirical magazine Punch, lived on the High Street in Crawley from 1858 until his death in 1870. He became an important figure in Crawley society, and was generous with his time and money: for example, in 1863, he organised and paid for festivities at The George Hotel and the nearby White Hart Inn to celebrate the wedding of Edward, Prince of Wales and Princess Alexandra of Denmark. A blue plaque outside the George commemorates his time in the town.

The hotel was central to the plot of Sir Arthur Conan Doyle's mystery novel Rodney Stone, written in 1896. Sussex's bareknuckle prizefighting tradition was a central theme, and the novel described at length the build-up to a fight involving the eponymous narrator's friend Boy Jim, including the moment they arrived at "the high front door of the old George Inn, glowing from every door and pane and crevice, in honour of the noble company who were to sleep within that night". Jem Belcher, one of several real bareknuckle fighters who featured in fictionalised form in the novel, trained Boy Jim at the hotel.

John George Haigh, a notorious serial killer in the 1940s known for his "acid bath" murders, stayed at the hotel on numerous occasions, and dined there on the day he killed one of his victims.

== Haunting ==
The hotel is reputedly haunted by the ghost of a nightwatchman, Mark Hurston (or Hewton), who died by drinking poisoned wine—either planted to trap a recurring intruder to the inn, or adulterated by a guest angered at being woken by him. It has been reported that a locked broom cupboard has been found open, strange figures have been seen, and electric lights have turned on and off.

== See also ==
- Grade II* listed buildings in West Sussex
- Listed buildings in Crawley
