= Dawes Road, London =

Street in London, United Kingdom

Coordinates: 51.48100°N 0.20810°W

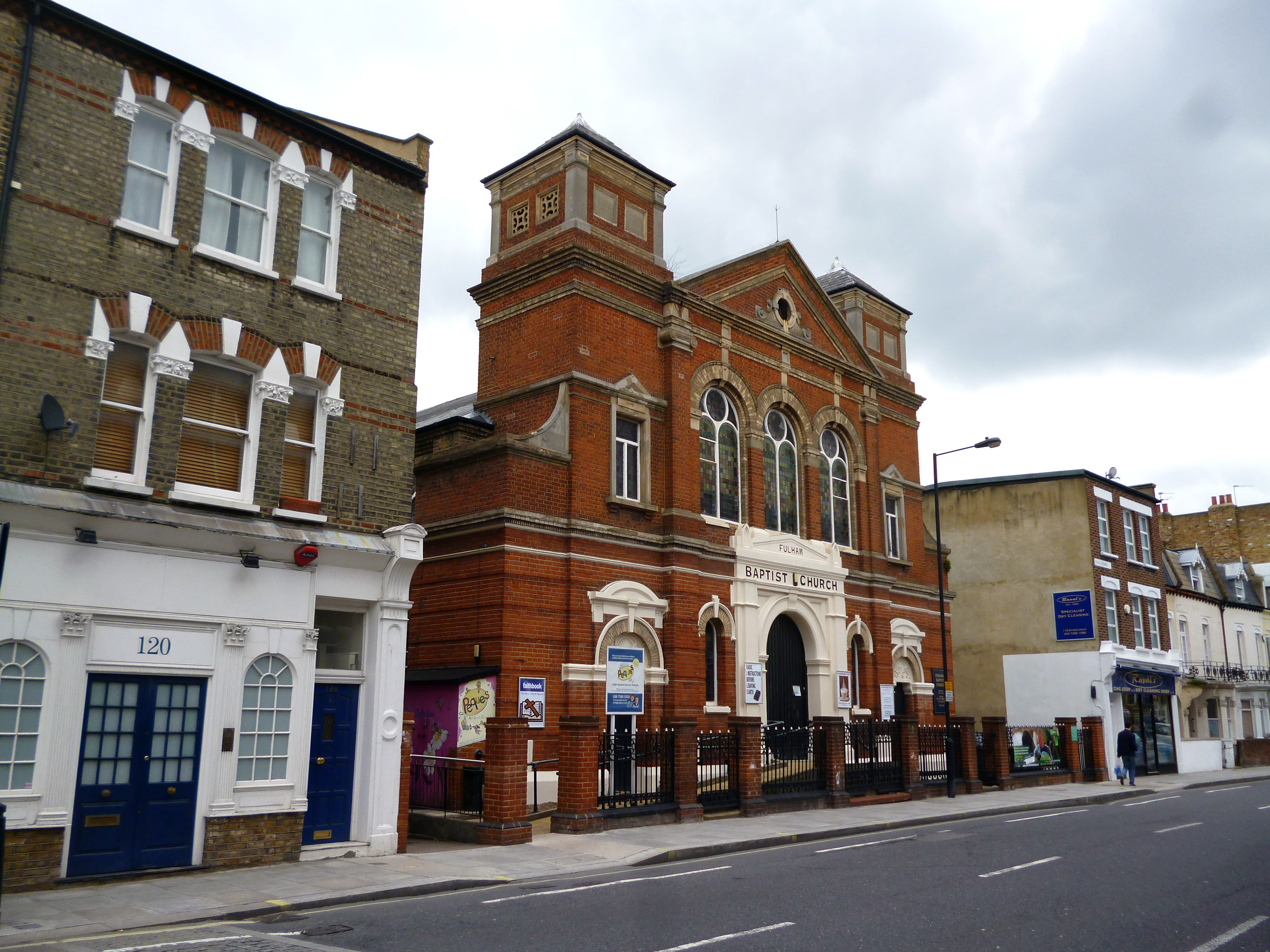
Fulham Baptist Church, Dawes Road

Dawes Road or the A3219 is a street in Fulham, London.

It runs roughly west to east from Munster Road to North End Road.

The Doll's Hospital at no 16 was a toy shop and the scene of a triple murder in 1948.
