= Ancient Priors =

Medieval hall house in Crawley, West Sussex, England

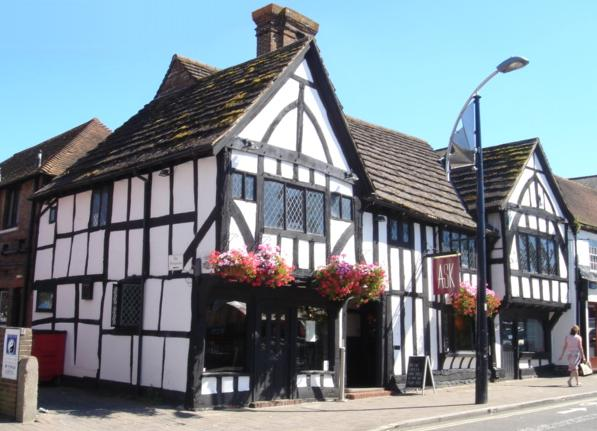
- The exterior looking southeastwards

- Location within Crawley

General information
- Architectural style: Medieval timber-framed
- Location: 49–51 High Street, Crawley, West Sussex, England
- Coordinates: 51.1139°N 0.1903°W
- Year built: c. 1450
- Renovated: 1930s

Renovating team
- Architect: Harry Charman

Listed Building – Grade II*
- Official name: The Ancient Priors (Minters Restaurant a Louis Coiffeur)
- Designated: 21 June 1948
- Reference no.: 1207420

The Ancient Priors is a medieval timber-framed hall house on the High Street in Crawley, a town and borough in West Sussex, England. It was built in approximately 1450, partly replacing an older (probably 14th-century) structure—although part of this survives behind the present street frontage. It has been expanded, altered and renovated many times since, and fell into such disrepair by the 1930s that demolition was considered. It has since been refurbished and is now a restaurant, although it has been put to various uses during its existence. Secret rooms, whose purpose has never been confirmed for certain, were discovered in the 19th century. English Heritage designated it a Grade II* listed building for its architectural and historical importance, and it has been described as Crawley's "most prestigious medieval building" and "the finest timber-framed house between London and Brighton".

== History ==
Crawley's development as a permanent settlement dates from the early 13th century, when a charter was granted for a market to be held; a church was founded by 1267. The area, on the edge of the High Weald, probably gained its name—referring to a crow-infested forest clearing—by the 10th century. Some sources assert that a building stood on the site of the Ancient Priors by this time, claiming that it was built between 1150 and 1250 and was used as a chantry-house or priest's house associated with St John the Baptist's Church. Extensive archaeological investigation in the 1990s determined that although the possibility of an older building on the site could not be ruled out, the oldest part of the present structure is 14th-century and the main part (fronting the east side of the High Street) dates from about 1450 and incorporates no older fabric.

Crawley's oldest buildings surrounded the High Street, a north–south route which straddled the boundary of Crawley and Ifield parishes and formed part of the main road from London to Brighton and Shoreham on the English Channel coast. Burgage plots—medieval land divisions with houses or other buildings which were rented from the Lord of the manor—were particularly clearly defined on the east side of the High Street; the buildings within them usually faced the High Street, but plots were sometimes subdivided. This is believed to have happened at the site of the Ancient Priors, where the main (15th-century) part of the building faces west on to the High Street, and the older section faces south and is hidden from view. The latter is known to be the oldest structure remaining on Crawley High Street.

The building was originally used as a dwelling house, and the accompanying burgage plot was used for small-scale agriculture. The first confirmed owners were a family of colliers, who acquired it in 1608. It passed through many owners throughout the 17th century, some of whom rented the building to others; furthermore, in many cases the two parts of the building were occupied by different families or tenants. By 1668, when it was owned by a resident of Worth, the whole building had become an inn. Known at first as The Whyte Harte, its spelling was later standardised to The White Hart. Around this time, the entire messuage consisted of the inn itself, some barns, an orchard and a garden. In the early 18th century, the prominent local ironmaster Leonard Gale—holder of much property in the Crawley area—owned the building, and is believed to have lived there. By 1753, when the Brett family (who had held the property for 26 years) sold the messuage for £473 (£90,700 as of 2025), it also had stables, and covered about 2 acres (0.81 ha).

Within a decade of this sale, the building was no longer used as an inn and was renamed Old White Hart Farm. (A new, larger White Hart Inn was built nearby and opened in 1790.) By the 19th century, it became two separate entities again: according to the United Kingdom Census 1841, two families lived in the main building and a woman and seven children occupied the older section. They were tenants, and the owner had added large amounts of farmland to the estate: as well as the original 2 acres (0.81 ha), another 64 acres (26 ha) lay outside the old burgage boundaries.

In 1881 the building was converted into a single entity again and became a Temperance Hotel for a few years. During the renovation work, hidden rooms were discovered. Visitors to the hotel included Lord Kitchener, but the venture failed and a shop unit with residential accommodation above was established instead. Various shopkeepers passed through until an antiques dealer, Mr Parkhurst, took the tenancy in 1911. He changed the name to The Ancient Priest's House (and later The Ancient Prior's House, which evolved into Ancient Priors) and used it as a showroom for his antique furniture, further enhancing the ancient appearance by removing plaster to reveal the internal timberwork and replacing modern windows with medieval-style diamond-mullioned equivalents. During this period, the owner tried unsuccessfully to auction the property, and the associated landholding reverted to the original 2 acres (0.81 ha) because the rest of the estate had been acquired by the railway, the local council and other parties who wanted to build on it.

After Parkhurst's death, the Ancient Priors stood empty and went into decline. By the late 1930s, the local council wanted to demolish it to allow for redevelopment of the High Street. Harry Charman, who owned a clothing shop nearby, bought it in 1937 and renovated it, converting it into three self-contained units. The main part of the façade became a tearoom; the old southern section was used as a sweet shop; and the northernmost part of the main building had various uses, including for many years a hairdressing salon. During the 1940s, John George Haigh the acid-bath murderer used on the occasion of their visits to his workshop in nearby Leopold Road to entertain his victim Mrs Olive Durand-Deacon to tea at the Ancient Priors. By the 1970s, the tearoom was upgraded to a fully licensed restaurant.

Crawley-born boxer Alan Minter, who won a bronze medal at the 1972 Olympic Games and became Middleweight champion of the world in 1979, bought the restaurant in 1977 together with his manager. It was renamed "Minter's Restaurant & Wine Bar" and had an inn sign depicting a bare-knuckle prizefighter outside it. Minter ran it himself until 1980, when new management took over. They bought the premises in 1983 and renamed it "Solomon's Restaurant", but stopped trading on 27 February 1988 and sold the building to an estate agency. The owners said they could not compete with the popularity of fast-food outlets, and claimed that a poor atmosphere in the town at night discouraged people from eating out. Since then, it has become a restaurant again, operating as the Crawley outlet of the ASK restaurant chain.

The Ancient Priors was Grade II* listed by English Heritage on 21 June 1948; this defines it as a "particularly important building of more than special interest" and of national importance. As of February 2001, it was one of 12 Grade II* structures, and 100 listed buildings and structures of all grades, in the Borough of Crawley.

== Architecture ==
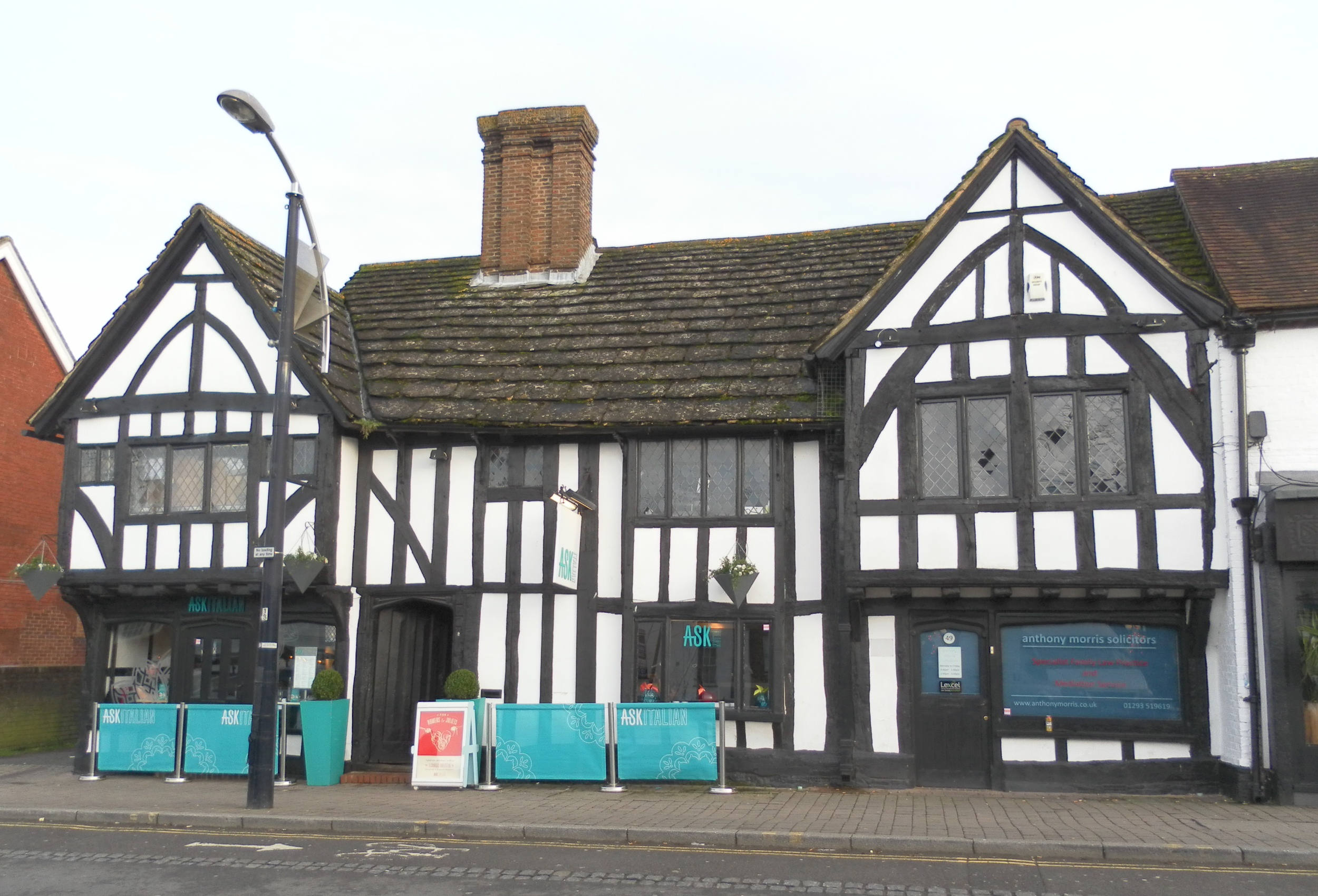
The roof of the building has a prominent chimney-stack.

The Ancient Priors is a "complete and well-preserved example" of a Wealden hall house, and is more elaborate than most of the other hall houses in the north of Sussex. It has a roughly L-shaped plan, formed by the south-facing 14th-century section and the west-facing structure built in about 1450. In the late 19th century, a small eastward-projecting extension was built at the rear of the northern side, making the building more U-shaped; this part is of brick, but the rest of the structure is timber-framed with some plasterwork. The roof uses "Horsham slab" tiles made of locally dug clay.

Earlier sources asserted that the southern wing of the building was a later addition to the main part: the early 16th century was suggested as the likely construction date. The work undertaken in 1993 disproved this, and instead found that this part, with two bays, was older and originally had three bays. Although it is now joined to the main part of the building, it was a separate hall house with a two-bay open hall (one bay of which survives) and discrete bays at the west and east ends. The internal timber work includes crown posts, arch-braces and some decorative panelling. There is also a chimney-stack and fireplace at the east end.

The main frontage, facing the High Street, is about 23 feet (7.0 m) long from north to south. An open hall, formed of two bays of about 10 feet (3.0 m) each, forms the main part of the interior. The exterior has gabled cross-wings at the north and south ends flanking a recessed central section. The cross-wings were jettied, but this has been partly filled in. The northern wing, forming the northwest corner of the present building, shares the same roofline and framing as the main hall, but the southern wing (adjacent to the 14th-century part of the building) is framed separately. Crown posts, arched braces, purlins, open trusses and tie-beams can be seen inside; their quality has been described as "very superior" and "remarkable", and the roof structure as a whole is described as unusual for the area.

No original windows remain, but traces of an oriel window have been found; another is believed to have existed near the present window in the eastern face. A large chimney-stack was added in the 16th century when the upper storey was added and the building ceased to be an open hall house. Cellars existed until the 1960s, when they were filled in after they flooded.

=== Hidden rooms ===
The discovery of secret rooms during the renovations of 1881 led to much speculation. Evidence suggests that they were used first by Roman Catholic priests during the Reformation—either as a safe hiding place or as a venue for secret services during the time when public Roman Catholic worship was banned. The locally popular allegation that the building was also used by smugglers is also believed to be true: smugglers from nearby Copthorne—a notorious centre of such activity—are thought to have based themselves there in the 18th and early 19th centuries.

There were three secret rooms: one on the upper storey between two of the bedrooms, another behind a fireplace in the kitchen of the 14th-century part of the building, and a third under the floor by another fireplace. The first of these rooms, which measured 36 square feet (3.3 m^{2}), was accessed through a trapdoor in the floor. A meat hook hanging from the ceiling of a passageway near the main kitchen had to be pulled in a certain direction to unlock the trapdoor. The room under the floor was reached in a similarly awkward way: if a carving above the mantelpiece was twisted in a certain way, the fireplace would move outwards to reveal a set of steps leading down to the hiding place. All of the hidden rooms have now been removed or filled in.

== See also ==
- Grade II* listed buildings in West Sussex
