= Royal Oak Inn, Rouse Hill =

Royal Oak Inn
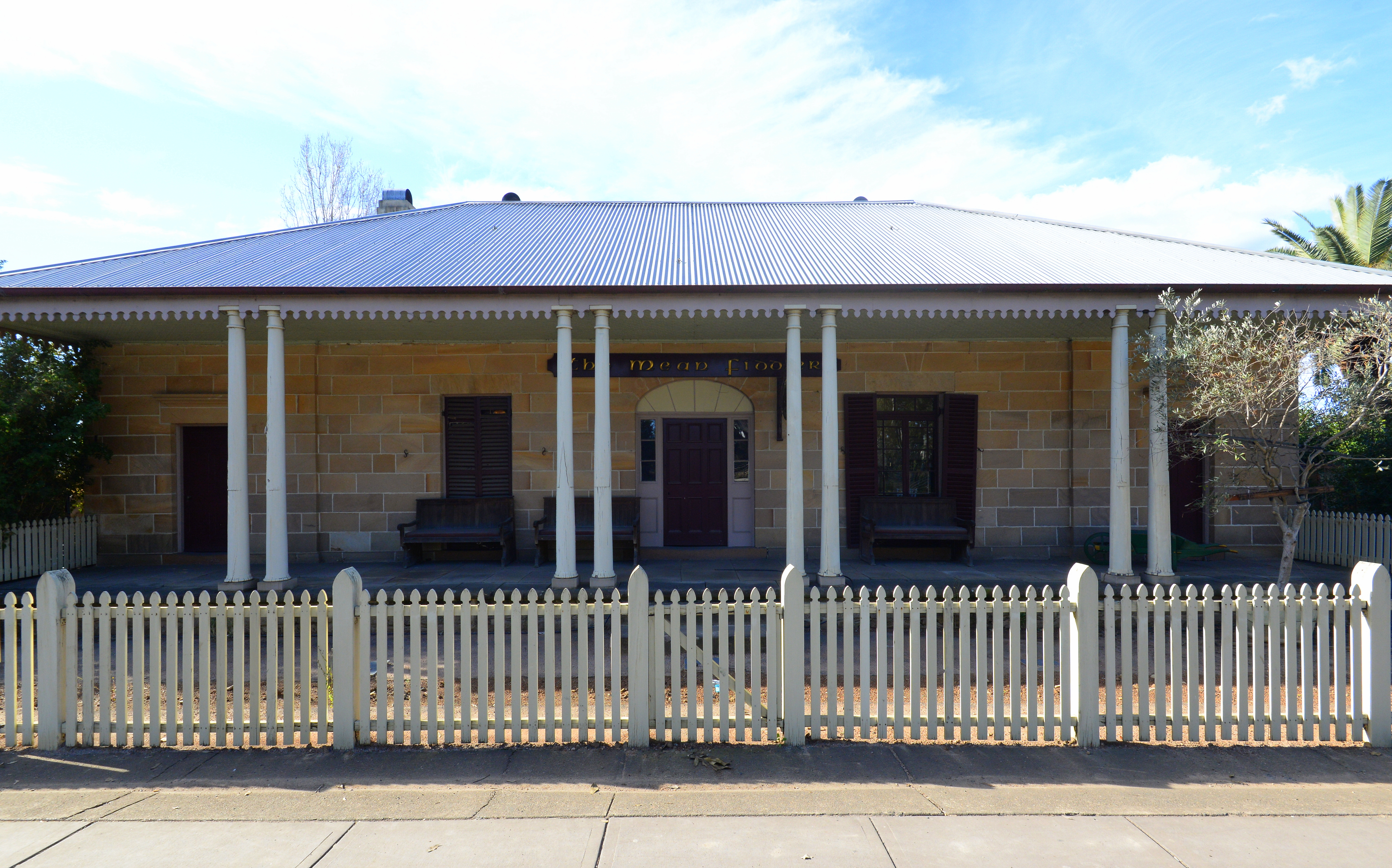
- Royal Oak Inn, now known as the Fiddler Hotel

- Location within Sydney Location within Australia
- 33°41′12″S 150°55′10″E
- Location: Windsor Road, Rouse Hill, The Hills Shire, New South Wales, Australia

History
- Built: 1829

Site notes
- Architectural style: Australian Georgian Revival

New South Wales Heritage Register
- Official name: Royal Oak Inn (former); Fiddler Hotel; Queens Arms Inn
- Type: State heritage (built)
- Designated: 2 April 1999
- Reference no.: 698
- Type: Inn/Tavern
- Category: Commercial

The Royal Oak Inn is a heritage-listed hotel located on the corner of Windsor Road and Commercial Road, in Rouse Hill in The Hills Shire local government area of New South Wales, Australia. It was built in 1829. It has also been known as the Queens Arms Inn, and is currently known as the Fiddler Hotel. The property is privately owned and was added to the New South Wales State Heritage Register on 2 April 1999.

== History ==
Rouse Hill was first referred to by Governor King in relation to the clearing of land at Castle Hill in March 1802. Originally the locality was known as part of Mulgrave Place. It was changed to Upper Nelson when the original Hawkesbury Road was constructed. The convict uprising at the Government Farm at Castle Hill and subsequent events in 1804, known as the Battle of Vinegar Hill, saw the locality become known as Vinegar Hill for a time, before being changed to Rouse Hill following a request by local landowner Richard Rouse. Rouse had occupied his grant from 1813, although the official grant was not made until some time later.

The site containing the former Royal Oak Inn (Note: The information below may be inaccurate as some previous historical research may have confused this building with the former White Hart Inn located approximately 1.9 kilometres (1.2 mi) to the south along Windsor Road. Some information here about owners and licensees may in fact refer to the White Hart Inn.) was originally part of a 15-hectare (36-acre) grant to Charles Davis on 13 January 1818. (Portion 80 in the Shire of Baulkham Hills, Parish of Castle Hill). It was bounded by Thomas Kelly's land to the north west, Windsor Road to the south west, Lucy Mileham's land to the south east and the Chain of Ponds (Caddies Creek) on to the north east. Davis arrived as a convict in the colony on the Hillsborough in 1799 and was granted a conditional pardon in 1812.

In 1818, Windsor Road was still a track and Davis held a total of 33 hectares (82 acres) of which 19 hectares (46 acres) were cleared and 6.1 hectares (15 acres) under cultivation. He had two horses, 18 head of cattle and employed labourer John Dunn. A house was located on the property by 1823 at the intersection of Windsor Road and later Commercial Road, since demolished. In 1829 he leased part of his land to William Cross who was licensee of the nearby White Hart Inn, one of the earliest licensed premises in the colony. A publican's license, the first for the site, was issued to Cross for the inn in 1830. Davis was farming elsewhere on the site.

Convicted London joiner and carpenter James Gough (1790–1876) who arrived on the Earl Spencer in 1813 and got a conditional pardon in 1821 won a private commission for the White Hart Inn between Parramatta and Windsor.

By 1839 John Booth was the licensee for the White Hart and on 3 March 1841 Davis leased the inn site to Booth, a former convict who married Sarah Tighe in 1839, and the licensee for the inn between 1832 and 1834. The inn license changed hands several times before returning to Booth. John Booth bought the Davis land and Inn during 1841 and changed the name to the Queens Arms. He renamed the inn the Royal Oak in 1845. Davis continued to own and farm the surrounding land.

During the 1840s depression Booth found himself in financial trouble and his creditors foreclosed on his property, selling it to George A. Sheffield in 1852. Booth died in 1866 and was credited as being the first person to carry mail from Sydney on the Bathurst and Windsor Roads. In 1853 Davis leased an adjoining 45 hectares (110 acres) which he worked as Vinegar Hill Farm.

John Seath purchased the Inn in 1858 and had changed the name to the White Hart Inn by 1865. He had arrived as a convict on the Minstrel in 1825 and was assigned as a carpenter to William Cox. He married in 1839 and was included as a member of the Hawkesbury Agricultural Society when it was formed in 1850. He also purchased the license and additional lots adjoining Davis' original holding to the north and east of the property. He ran the inn until his death in 1876. It was during this period that there was an expansion in railways and rail transport which saw a decline in the role of roadside inns for transport and travelling purposes. For example, the rail connection to Windsor was completed in 1864.

Following Seath's death the property passed to his wife Ann and son John Seath Junior, and the inn license lapsed. It does not appear to have been reactivated in the district for a significant period. By 1900 the inn property appears to have been subdivided and part of it, including the weatherboard house sold to a Mrs E. Miles and later Mrs E. Verdon remained in the house until her death in 1936. The inn site remained in the property of Ann Seath until her death in 1916 when owner ship passed to her sons John Junior and Charles Seath. They transferred the property to Thomas Alfred Paterson of Rouse Hill who consolidated this parcel with his other holdings to the east to create a 40-hectare (98-acre) property. Peterson, a contractor and poultry farmer, undertook many changes including upgrading the former inn to become a residence between 1916 and 1925. Work included replacement of the original shingle roof with tiles and repairs to the brickwork.

In 1941 Petersen subdivided the land into two allotments. Lot A was sold to Petersen's wife in 1949 and the land previously sold to Mrs Miles. It is believed to have probably been the site of Davis' original home constructed in 1823. Lot B, the former in site, was sold to John Cooper from the Parramatta Hotel in 1947. Cooper sold the property in the same year to Stuart Lester Binns, a dog fancier from Gosford who operated the building as a restaurant, antique shop, refreshment rooms and residence between 1947 and 1963.

In 1962 Windsor Road was realigned, widened, straightened and sealed, and appears to have been the impetus for Binns to subdivide the inn site into at least five allotments under deposited plan 30916. Lot 4 contained the former inn. All the other allotments had been sold by 1964. In 1966 Emanuel Schembri, a sign writer from Prospect, his wife Catherine and Dominic Schembri purchased the inn site. The leased it to Graham Bridgewater and Kiaran Warner who renovated the inn and operated it as the licensed restaurant "The Royal Oak Inn". It was during this period that the first car park was constructed. It was later used as an antique store before being returned to use as a restaurant again. In the late 1970s the property was advertised as the Windsor Wayhouse offering hayrides followed by a meal by the fire.

From 1977 a series of reconfigurations of the former allotments comprising Lots A & B created by Petersen in 1941 have taken place. This has allowed the construction of the rear machinery shed to form the Vinegar Hill Woolshed in 1985 and a Wedding reception hall to the northeast of the old inn in 1986–87. Some land was lost to road widening in 1977 and there has been further lot reconfiguration since the 1980s.

The Old Windsor Road had a major upgrade in 2006 when significant works were undertaken along its length.

== Description ==
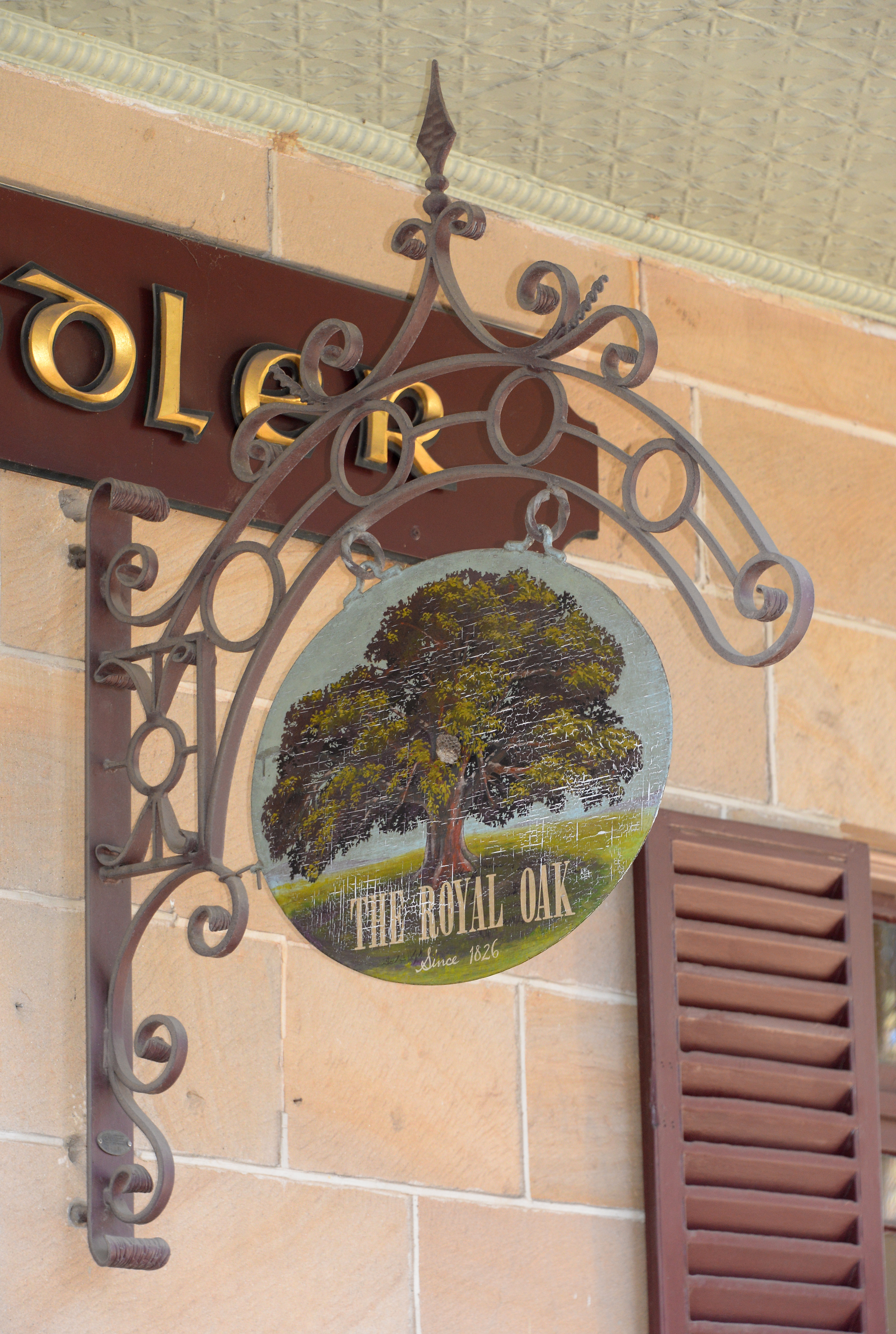
Old sign on hotel

Single storey Georgian sandstone inn, with front verandah and a single-pitch (formerly tiled), hip roof over the whole. Street front verandah has doubled timber Doric columns and a simple scalloped valance. Front six-panel door has glazing in the upper four panels, flanked by side lights and surmounted by a large fanlight. French doors open onto the verandah either side of the central front door with shutters. Four panelled doors sit on the outside of the French doors. All doors have sandstone headers and thresholds. The Front elevation of dressed sandstone, sides and rear are random-coursed.

The building has stone cellars below, and sandstock brick extensions to the rear (south-eastern end of inn building) on a lower ground level (originally a kitchen, possible smoke house/ meat preserving room, high roofed open sided area possibly for carriage storage, and large room with a baker's oven, then an attached blacksmith's shop built of timber slab.

Part of the original kitchen wing is incorporated into later additions. The rear verandah is detached from the main roof.

In addition to the former inn, there has been a substantial amount of redevelopment on the subject site, to the back of the building. In summary, works have included a motel development adjacent to the former inn, alterations and additions in 1996, an acoustic wall in 2001 with an addition in 2003, a courtyard bar in 2002 and additions to the Royal Oak Restaurant in 2003.

=== Condition ===
As at 5 January 2012, historical evidence suggests that the major physical development of the site was focused on the Windsor Road frontage and specifically the position of the first Inn. The archaeological resource is likely to exist in the form of disturbed occupation deposits within the footprint of the Inn and rear extension. Deeper sub-surface features at the rear (east) of the Inn and extension. These would take the form of backfilled wells and cesspits. The potential archaeological resource away from the main Inn complex had been severely disturbed by development of the site, especially grading works associated with the carpark.

The former Royal Oak has a level of integrity which is fair. The main part of the original complex remains intact.

=== Modifications and dates ===
Since its establishment, the following modifications have been made to the Royal Oak Inn:

- c. 1820s – early residence on land between Inn and corner of Commercial/Old Windsor Roads (part Lot A DP 83867) has been demolished
- 1916 – onwards – Peterson replaced overmantles on fireplaces, repaired eroded brick extension
- 1916–1925 – upgrading of property as farmhouse including reroofing, verandah, lattice panels, fireplace surrounds and other joinery repairs
- 1923 – shingle roof replaced with tiles
- 1936 – Peterson bought land between the Inn and Commercial Road and his son, John built a house on the corner and ran a produce shed from this site.
- 1947–1963 – antique shop - residence and restaurant refreshment rooms present
- 1949 – Peterson subdivided the estate and sold the inn site to Stuart Binns, a "dog fancier" of Gosford
- 1954 – part of the Old Windsor Road/Commercial Road excluding the house site of John Peterson sold to Emmanuel Schembri then to Binns
- 1962 – Old Windsor Road realigned, widened and sealed (formerly winding, narrow and unsealed)
- 1963 – Binns subdivided inn and Old Windsor Road side of land to Cecil, Eric and Valerie John Kroehnert. Proposal to convert antique shop and residence into a restaurant, approved by Council but not implemented
- 1970 – Inn began trading as "the Windsor Wayhouse" offering colonial fare and hayrides. Restaurant use recommenced, car park constructed
- 1976 – Inn leased to Graham Bridgewater and Kiaran Waner who renovated it as a licensed restaurant "The Royal Oak Inn". The Kroehnerts constructed a barn for storage, then sold antiques from here and ran an outdoor eating area on lawn behind the inn (without council consent), and a caravan annexe display and riding school on the next door lot 2)
- 1979 – the 5-acre lot 3 (with the inn on it and 66 m frontage to OWR) sold to Peakhurst Properties - an application for extensions to include an arts and crafts centre was rejected by Council
- 1983 – property transferred to Norlex Holdings P/L
- 1984 – John Peterson's house (corner OWR/Commercial Road) passed to Robert Thompson, 1989 to David Commins, then owner into Bankruptcy, later to Norlex Holdings P/L
- 1983–1984 – Courtyard canopy constructed
- 1985 – Rear machinery shed extended to form Vinegar Hill Woolshed
- 1986–1987 – Wedding Reception Hall constructed (to rear on north-eastern side of old inn)
- 1987 – Norlex Holdings consolidated its land holdings (lot 3 and the Commercial Road property)
- 1988 – Woolshed additions
- 1990s – considerable alterations and additions to the rear of the inn and extension
- 1991 – Motel development on western side/adjacent to Royal Oak Inn, change of use from Wedding Reception Centre to licensed Tavern
- 1996 – additions and alterations
- 1997 – refurbishment and restoration works to inn building
- 1998 – Internal alterations and additional office space
- 2001 – acoustic wall constructed
- 2002 – demolition of dwelling on Lot 2 DP 13580156. Courtyard Bar also constructed
- 2003 – Additions to the Royal Oak Restaurant, extension of existing acoustic sound wall, subdivision and reconfiguration of existing carpark
- 2004 – Alterations and additions to the Mean Fiddler Hotel
- 2005 – Bottle shop and take away constructed. Demolition of dwelling, swimming pool and 5 agricultural buildings to construct bottle shop and associated parking lot
- 2006 – Restaurant and bistro works
- 2007 – Relocation of existing TAB, new lounge area and new bar
- 2009 – Motel health spa, pool, gym and associated parking works
- 2010 – Conversion of existing take away shop to new take away restaurant with drive through facility

== Heritage listing ==
As at 11 January 2012, the former Royal Oak Inn (now the Fiddler Inn) has State significance as an important survivor of an early colonial coaching inn of the 1820–40 period with the main part of the original complex of buildings remaining intact. It is believed to be the site of one of the first inns on the Parramatta to Windsor/Richmond route and one of the earliest licensed premises in the colony, dating to 1830.

It is rare on Windsor Road between Parramatta and Windsor as an inn which remains in use as a "watering hole" or "stop over" for the general public and travellers along the Windsor Road. Its sandstone frontage and verandah facing Windsor Road is a reminder of the inns once were plentiful along Windsor and Old Windsor Roads

The Inn is a significant component in Windsor Road's urban landscape, representing a site important in the development of early travel routes in the colony. The historical development of the site reflects the changing nature of roadside inns, particularly in response to the increase of rail travel following the construction of the railway line. This further evolved with the rise of car ownership from the mid twentieth century.

The inn is indicative of an era when such buildings were used as resting places and watering holes between Parramatta and Windsor prior to the construction of the railway line and played an important role in the economic and social development of the local area during the nineteenth and twentieth centuries. The inn also has associations with numerous owners of the site who were involved in some of the earliest development of the area.

The site has local significance for the way its development mirrored the early development of small grants through the north west of the Cumberland Plain.

The archaeological deposits associated with the underfloor areas of the site have State significance for their potential to demonstrate the nature of domestic and commercial activity on the site from its earliest European occupation.

The former Royal Oak Inn is descended from an early colonial coaching inn dating from 1829 to 1830, and is the site of one of the earliest licensed premises in the colony.

== See also ==
- List of pubs in Sydney
- Australian non-residential architectural styles
- White Hart Inn Archaeological Site
