= Dartington Morris =

Dance group

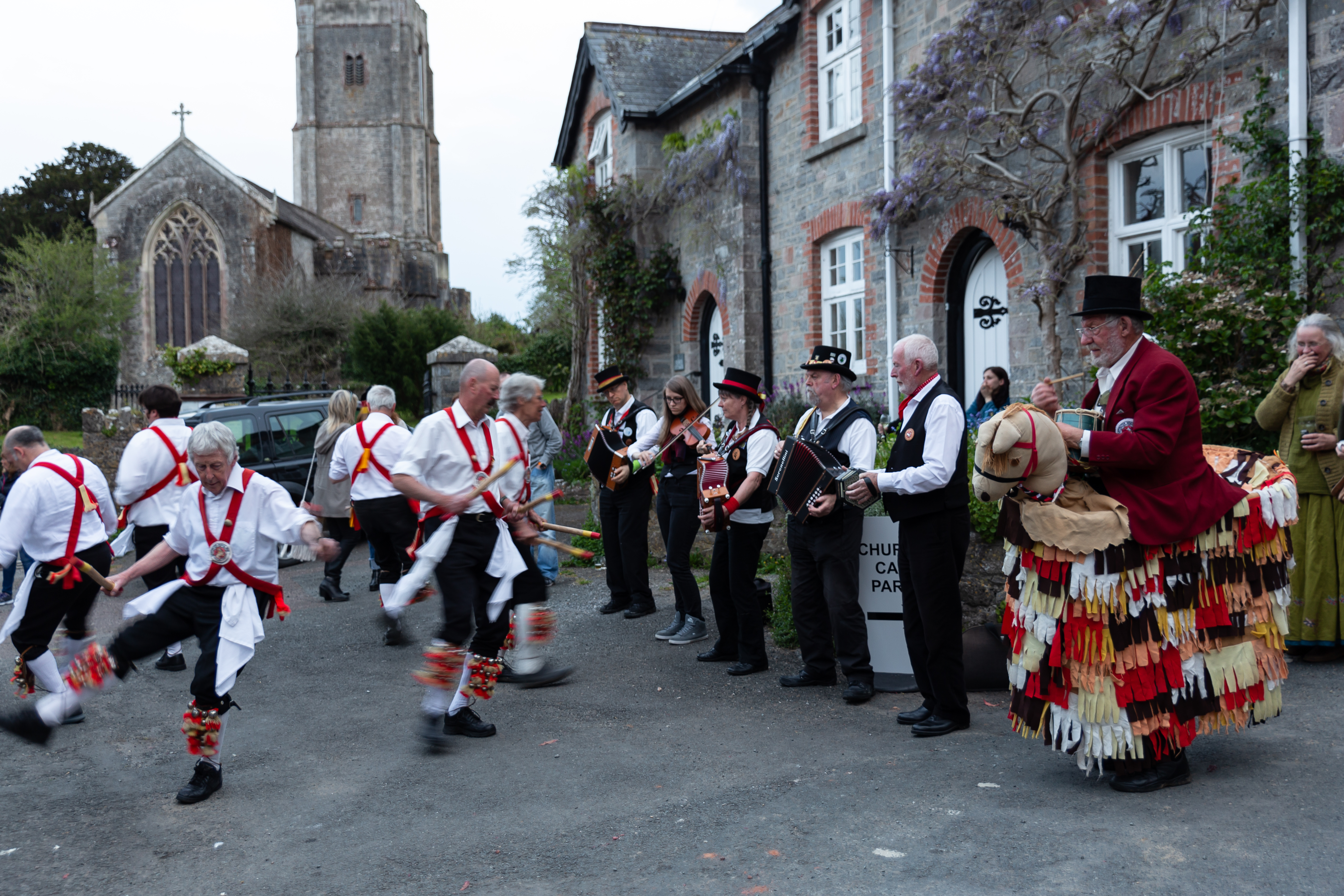
Dartington Morris dancing outside the 'Tally Ho!' Inn in Littlehempston, near Totnes, Devon on 6 May 2016

Dartington Morris are a dance troupe based in Dartington, near Totnes, Devon, England. The group formed as a men's dance side (with male and female musicians) in 1968 at Dartington Hall and is a member side of the Morris Ring.

In the early days the side practised in the 13th Century "Pillar Studio" at Dartington Hall. Whilst practising and contemplating a name for the side, Leonard Elmhirst, a founder of the Dartington Hall Trust, informed the men that he had once danced the Morris. He suggested that the side call themselves The Dartington Morris Men and use on their kit the Dartington crest of a White Hart on a red rose, the crest of Richard II and his half-brother John Holland, 1st Duke of Exeter and 1st Earl of Huntingdon (who was given the manor of Dartington for services rendered in battle.)

Two previous Dartington Morris sides are believed to have danced in the Totnes area; one at the end of the 19th century, the other in the 1930s. One of these sides apparently danced in bare feet.

In 2021 the side agreed to lift the restriction to male dancers and now welcome dancers of any gender, formally changing their name from Dartington Morris Men to Dartington Morris.

The side kit is based on the colours red, white and gold, derived from the crest, with black breeches and shoes. Dancers perform to the music provided by live musicians, with the White Hart "Leonard" (new in 2024) and a Fool occasionally adding to the show. The side's horse "Champernowne" has now been put into retirement. They perform mainly traditional Cotswold morris dances and also uniquely perform dances from the lost Filkins tradition, reconstructed by erudite member Christopher Farr. A North Skelton Longsword dance is performed on occasion by six dancers. At Christmas and New Year the performance is supplemented by the Dartington Christmas Mummers' Play.

The side perform mainly on Friday evenings from May to September throughout South Devon, starting at dawn on 1 May each year, often at Totnes Castle. Other regular events are organised, such as the annual day of dance in Totnes, with about a dozen invited sides and the annual Brutus Celebration in July.
