= White Hart Inn, Crawley =

White Hart Inn
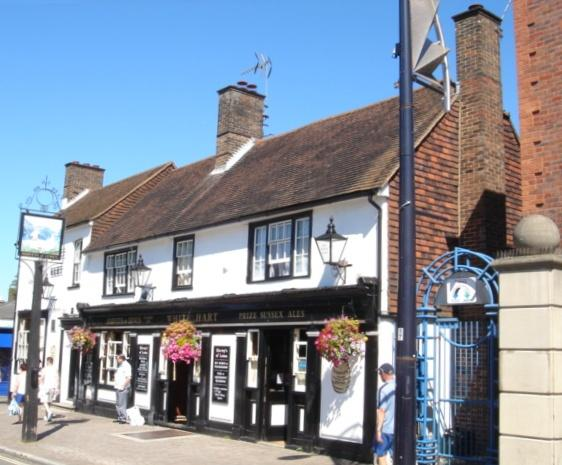
- The inn from the southwest

- Location within Crawley
- 51°06′54″N 0°11′24″W
- Location: 65 High Street, Crawley, West Sussex RH10 1BQ, England

History
- Built: 1770

Site notes
- Architectural style: Timber-framed

Listed Building – Grade II
- Official name: No 65 High Street (White Hart Hotel)
- Designated: 23 February 1983
- Reference no.: 1298876

The White Hart Inn, also known as the White Hart Hotel, is a coaching inn on the High Street in Crawley, a town and borough in West Sussex, England. Built in the late 18th century to replace an older inn also under the sign of the White Hart, it also served as Crawley's main post office for most of the 19th century, and still operates as a public house in the 21st century. Its partly timber-framed structure, which incorporates part of an early 17th-century building, is characteristic of the area. It is designated a Grade II Listed building.

== History ==
Crawley developed slowly as a Wealden market town and ironmaking centre, focused on its north–south High Street, from the 13th century onwards. This street formed part of the main road from the capital city, London, to the increasingly fashionable seaside resort of Brighton. After the road was turnpiked in stages between the late 17th century and the mid-18th century, Crawley's position almost exactly halfway between the two allowed it to develop a prominent new role as a convenient stop for stagecoach passengers and drivers. By the late 18th century, it had become Sussex's main staging-post for journeys to and from London, as the neighbouring towns of Horsham and East Grinstead fell out of favour.

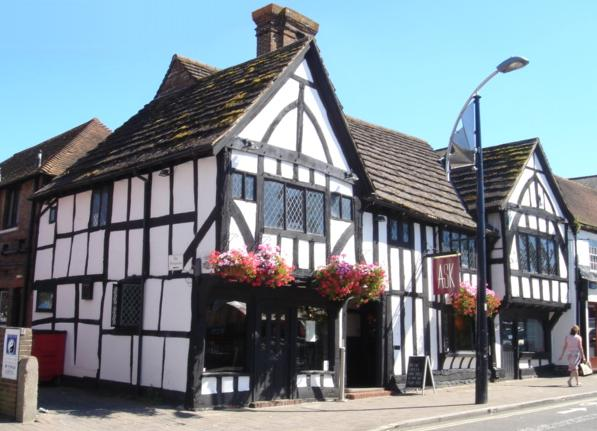
The sale of the Ancient Priors, formerly known as the White Hart, allowed the new larger White Hart Inn to be built nearby.

To fulfil this role, Crawley needed plenty of venues to entertain guests for a few hours or overnight, with rooms to accommodate overnight stops and facilities for changing teams of horses. Several medieval buildings on the High Street, such as the George Hotel, the Ancient Priors and the Old Punch Bowl, met this need to some extent, but none were built for that purpose: all had been adapted from existing structures with different uses. The Ancient Priors was built as a house with a small agricultural plot; the Old Punch Bowl had been a large farmhouse; and although the George had always been an inn, it expanded gradually and haphazardly across several neighbouring buildings. The Ancient Priors in particular was too small to meet the demand for its facilities. In 1753—at which point it was operating under the name The White Hart—it was sold, and soon afterwards became a farm. The proceeds were used to build a new White Hart Inn. A site 70 yards (64 m) further north on the High Street was selected; this was large enough to provide both a bigger building and a substantial area at the rear for the stabling of horses. Most sources agree that the new White Hart Inn opened in 1770, although some identify 1790 as the date. Architectural studies made in 1995 and 2003 attributed a date of around 1600 to the southern part of the building, suggesting that the inn was built around the core of an older structure.

The inn was successful at meeting the requirements of the increased coaching traffic, which had grown from one daily service in 1756 to five by 1790 and 30 by 1815. Its facilities included accommodation for 180 horses. It was also one of Crawley's centres of commercial activity throughout the 19th century: the town's main post office was based there between 1810 (when a daily mail coach service between London and Brighton began) and 1895, and a corn exchange existed between 1800 and 1883. The post office was attached to the north side of the inn, and was demolished in the 1950s to make way for the Broadwalk—a pedestrian thoroughfare which formed an integral part of Crawley New Town's shopping centre. Crawley's oldest friendly society was founded in the White Hart in 1827, and it was also the venue for the events of the "Crawley Feast Day"—an annual celebratory gathering for the town's businesspeople, popular throughout the 19th century. In 1863, Mark Lemon, the founder of Punch magazine and a prominent Crawley resident, organised celebrations at the inn after the marriage of Albert Edward Prince of Wales (later King Edward VII) and Princess Alexandra.

Stagecoach traffic declined in the late 19th century as trains, motor buses and cars successively became more popular, but some coaches continued to run until the 1940s. The White Hart Inn adapted and became a standard public house. As of 2009, it retains its original name, and is now in the ownership of Harveys Brewery (Harvey & Son (Lewes) Ltd.), a brewery based in Lewes in East Sussex. It is therefore a tied house. Harveys identify it as the busiest public house they own.

The White Hart Inn was listed at Grade II on 23 February 1983.

== Architecture ==
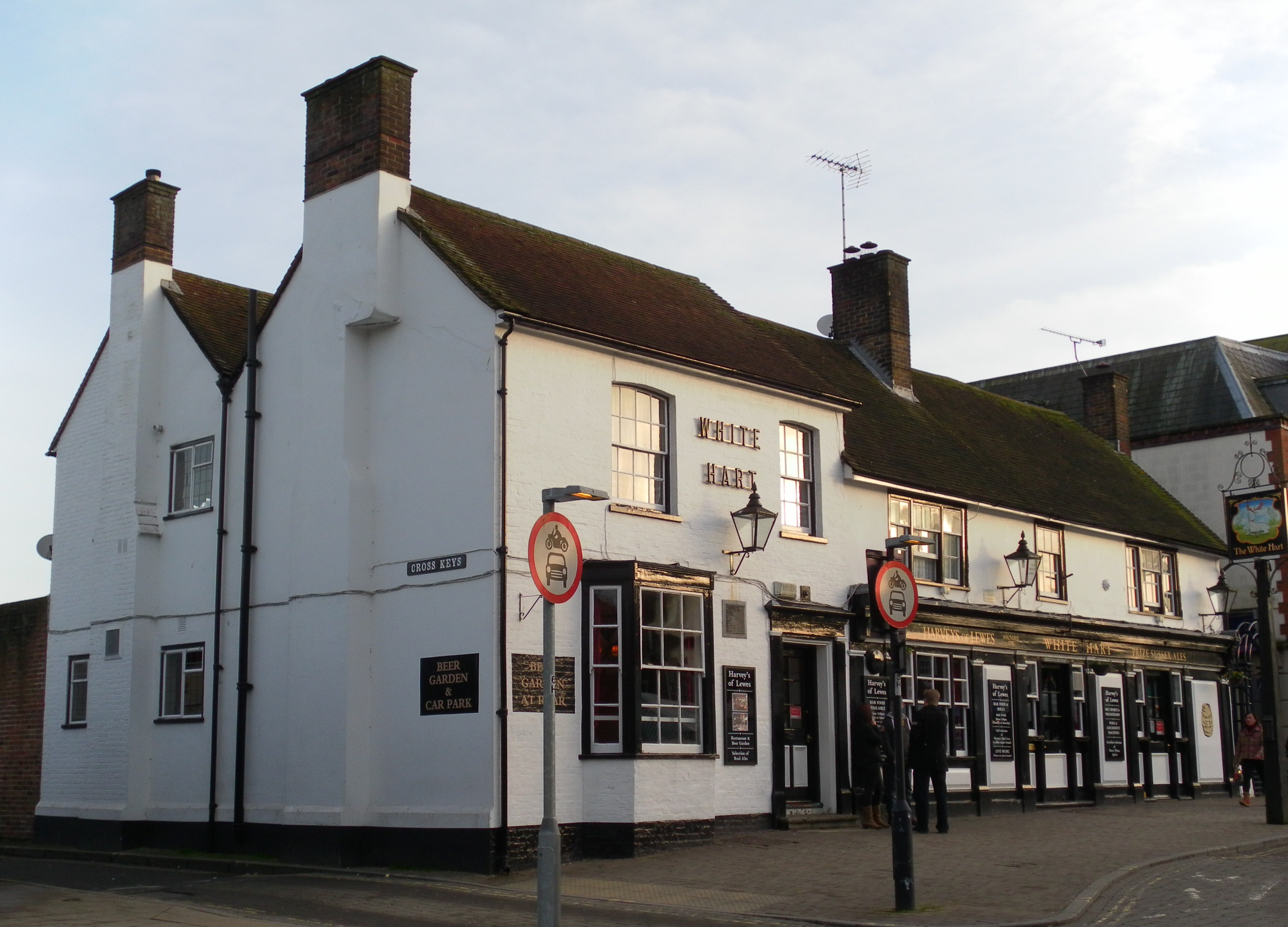
The 19th-century extension is in the foreground of this view from the northwest.

The White Hart Inn is a timber-framed building consisting of three bays on a north–south orientation. The exterior is clad in stuccoed brickwork, the roof is tiled, and there are three brick chimneys. The southern section is the remnants of a timber-framed house dating from about 1600 (original estimates attributed an 18th-century date, in line with the actual opening of the inn). This had a stair turret at the rear leading into the attic, but only the topmost steps of this structure remain. The attic is still a separate space, now two rooms with one external window under the roof gable at the south end. Later, the building was extended to the rear. In about 1830, an extension was built to the north; this is of two storeys, like the earlier part, but is slightly taller and has a separate roofline. It is of brick and has no timber-framing. Similarly, no timber is now visible on the lower storey of the older section of the building.
