= White Hart Inn Archaeological Site =

- Location within Sydney Location within Australia
- 33°42′06″S 150°55′47″E
- Location: Windsor Road, Beaumont Hills, New South Wales, Australia

History
- Built: 1827–

Site notes
- Owner: NSW Department of Planning, Industry and Environment

New South Wales Heritage Register
- Official name: White Hart Inn Archaeological Site
- Type: State heritage (archaeological-terrestrial)
- Designated: 24 August 2018
- Reference no.: 2007
- Type: Inn/Tavern
- Category: Transport - Land

White Hart Inn Archaeological Site is a heritage-listed inn and archaeological site at Windsor Road, Beaumont Hills in The Hills Shire local government area of New South Wales, Australia. It was built from 1827 to . The property is owned by NSW Department of Planning, Industry and Environment, a department of the Government of New South Wales. The site was added to the New South Wales State Heritage Register on 24 August 2018.

== History ==
The following historical overview has been sourced and summarised primarily from the excavation report prepared for the White Hart Inn, which provides a comprehensive historical background for the site.

The Darug people were living in The Hills region for thousands of years before the Kellyville area was opened for white settlement in the early 1800s.

=== Colonial settlement ===
The area was slow to develop and had a generally rural character, with agricultural activities limited to small private farming, including wheat crops and fruit growing. During this early period, Kellyville was often referred to as "there or nowhere" and was mainly a place to pass through on a journey to somewhere else. There were no distinct towns or villages within the area; houses were mainly scattered along the main roads of Windsor and Old Windsor Roads, which were established in the early nineteenth century to provide a more direct route from Sydney to Windsor and the burgeoning Hawkesbury region. A regular coach service was established along the route between Parramatta and Windsor by the mid-1820s, and several inns soon sprung up at various points along the road, providing important rest stops for travellers and horses.

Inns and inn-keeping have a long history in Australia. Along the colony's early major transport routes, such as Windsor Road, inns served as vital rest stops, providing food and lodging for travellers on what were often long and exhausting road journeys. In the early days of settlement, inns also functioned as local court houses, venues for colonial inquiries, places to transact business and social meeting places. Colonial inns shared a common architecture and design, being typically constructed as single storey Georgian vernacular buildings with verandahs with wings or second storeys later added for additional accommodation.

==== White Hart Inn ====
The White Hart Inn archaeological site is located on an early land grant made to John Moss in 1810. It and the surrounding early grants were transferred to Hugh Kelly in the early 1820s. Kellyville was likely named after him. In 1823, the land originally granted to John Moss came into the possession of William Cox, who was the principal magistrate at Hawkesbury and responsible for the creation of a road (later called Cox's Road) over the Blue Mountains in 1814. Cox ordered the construction of an inn on the site, which was completed in 1827 by James Gough. Gough was a convict and skilled carpenter, who had been appointed Overseer of Government Carpenters and worked closely with Cox on several government building projects. Gough was granted a conditional pardon by Governor Macquarie in January 1821.

The establishment he built on Windsor Road was called the White Hart Inn, and it commenced operation with Gough as the first publican, followed shortly after by William Cross in 1830. The inn was kept by several publicans over the course of its operation, including a female publican by the name of Sarah Tighe in 1832–33. Sarah's husband, John Booth, was the publican at the nearby Royal Oak Inn (also known as The Mean Fiddler), which was also established on Windsor Road in the mid-1820s. A complete list of publicans' licenses at the White Hart Inn can be found in the excavation report prepared by EMM Consulting Pty Ltd in 2016.

In an early description published in the Sydney Gazette, the new "fine and noble looking" White Hart Inn was noted to possess elegant furnishings and be well supplied to cater for the needs of travellers. By 1829, the inn had been "enlarged and fitted up in a neat and commodious manner with Bedrooms etc.". The White Hart Inn was captured in an early survey of Windsor Road in 1833, where it is noted on the survey plan as a public house.

Following Cox's death in 1837, the inn was put up for sale. It was described in an advertisement in the Sydney Herald as:

"that well-established Inn called the White Hart situate on Windsor Road. The Buildings are extensive and in good order and are situate on the market road half-way between Windsor Road and Parramatta. There is a good garden well stocked with fruit trees and one hundred and ten acres of Land well fenced in and partly in cultivation".

The property was purchased the following year by emancipated convict John Allen, who also served as the inn's publican for a time in the late 1840s. By this time, the number of roadside inns along Windsor Road had reached its peak and competition between the various inns was high. Allan died in 1860 and the property was bought by Rebecca Turner in 1866. By this time, the railway had reached Windsor. The introduction of railway travel in the 1860s led to a decline in the demand for coach services and many roadside inns were consequently closed and later demolished or converted into private residences. The White Hart Inn was put up for auction in 1881, with the auction notice describing it as being "so well and favourably known", and consisting of very commodious two storey brick buildings on stone foundations. The property was sold to the Bryan family and it remained in their ownership into the twentieth century.

The inn building was still on the site by the mid-1880s. It is shown on a survey plan of Windsor Road in 1885, where it is denoted as a brick building with verandahs on at least three sides. It was also used as a polling place in 1885, and described as "Bryan's late the White Hart Inn", suggesting that it was no longer functioning as an inn by this time. Indeed, the last publican's license for the inn had been issued in 1874. There is no reference to the inn after 1885, which suggests that the buildings were demolished sometime during the late 1880s-1890s, during the ownership of the Bryan family.

From the later part of the nineteenth century, much of the land surrounding the inn site was subdivided and sold, with much of the local area now devoted to orchards and small dairy farms. The land on which the inn was situated appears to have been consolidated and subdivided for sale sometime after 1925. Remains of the inn were reportedly rediscovered in the mid-1930s, including foundations and a mounting stone.

The Sheehan family owned the land from the early 1950s until 1965 when it was purchased by Leslie Jamie Muir, and the property was transferred to J.L. and M.M. Muir Properties Pty Ltd in 1972. The company went into liquidation in 2010, at which time the property was acquired by Sydney Water. The site is now under the ownership of the NSW Government.

=== Archaeological site ===
An archaeological test excavation was undertaken at the site in late 2013 as part of the early works program of the Sydney Metro Northwest project, prior to the commencement of construction activities. The purpose of the excavation was to determine the existence of relics relating to the former inn and their level of preservation and integrity. The investigation revealed potential archaeological deposits and intact structural features, including footings of the main inn building, a detached kitchen and a cistern. The artefacts recovered from the site are typical of the kinds of items expected to have been used in a colonial inn, and are primarily related to the preparation and serving of food and drinks. Other items, of both a commercial and domestic nature were also recovered, including coins (the earliest dating to 1816), pharmaceutical and perfume bottles, clay smoking pipes, a ceramic toothpaste container and buttons. The detached building contained a high concentration of bones and tableware, confirming its use as a kitchen.

The site was referred to as the Swan Inn in initial heritage assessments, however further historical research has found that the archaeological remains are more accurately that of the White Hart Inn.

The results of the excavation attracted significant public interest and a series of open days were held at the site prior to its conservation by reburial.

== Description ==
The White Hart Inn archaeological site consists of structural features and deposits relating to the former main inn building, detached kitchen and cistern. The archaeological remains are sufficiently intact to provide an indication as to the original layout of the inn, which appears to have been built to a standard form recognisable across NSW. The main inn building was fronted with a long verandah facing the road, with wing rooms for accommodation at either end, and a large dining / bar room in the centre.

The archaeological remains clearly demonstrate two building phases for the White Hart Inn. The earliest part of the building (c. 1827) is represented by large sandstone block footings, which based on historical descriptions, would have supported two-storeys. The inn was then enlarged in c. 1829 to provide more rooms for accommodation, which can be seen in the addition of brick footings extending from the southern wing. The detached kitchen was also likely added at this time, and linked to the rear of the main inn building by a brick footpath. It is possible that there would have been several other outbuildings associated with the operation of the inn behind the main inn building, such as a stable.

At the completion of the public open days in April 2014, the site was conserved in situ for further investigation or open interpretation. The site was covered with a non-woven geotextile to separate the exposed relics from redeposited fill. None of the site is currently visible above ground. The artefact assemblage retrieved from the test excavation is currently in secure storage until TfNSW find a suitable permanent repository for the artefacts.

== Heritage listing ==
As at 10 January 2018, the White Hart Inn Archaeological Site is of state significance as it provides surviving evidence of a roadside inn established during the early nineteenth century along one of the oldest roads in NSW. The site reflects the development and use of Windsor Road, which connected Sydney, Parramatta and Windsor, and demonstrates the importance of the colony's early road network. The remains of the White Hart Inn provide a rare, surviving archaeological resource, which retains the potential to yield valuable information about the design, construction, operation and management of early inns in NSW. Along the colony's early major transport routes, such as Windsor Road, inns served as vital rest stops, providing food and lodging for travellers on what were often long and exhausting road journeys. In the early days of settlement, inns also functioned as local court houses, venues for colonial inquiries, places to transact business and social meeting places.

White Hart Inn Archaeological Site was listed on the New South Wales State Heritage Register on 24 August 2018 having satisfied the following criteria.

The place is important in demonstrating the course, or pattern, of cultural or natural history in New South Wales.

The White Hart Inn Archaeological Site is of state significance for its historical values as it contains structural remains and potential archaeological deposits associated with an early colonial roadside inn built by James Gough, an emancipated convict, for William Cox, in c. 1827. William Cox was the principal magistrate at Hawkesbury and response for the creation of a road (later called Cox's Road) over the Blue Mountains in 1814. Gough was a convict and skilled carpenter who had been appointed Overseer of Government Carpenters and worked closely with Cox on several building projects.

The site is associated with the development and use of Windsor Road during the early to mid-nineteenth century, which was vital for the expansion of European settlement in the regions north-west of Sydney and is one of the oldest roads in NSW. The site is demonstrative of the importance of the colony's early road network, of which roadside inns were an essential component. The White Hart Inn was one of several establishments opened along Windsor Road in the early nineteenth century, providing necessary food and accommodation to travellers. The White Hart Inn was a popular landmark and rest stop on Windsor Road during the nineteenth century, being located approximately midway between Parramatta and Windsor. The White Hart Inn Archaeological Site also reflects the general shift in transportation patterns in NSW, particularly the decline in horse and coach traffic and subsequent closure and demolition of most roadside inns, following the opening of the railway to Windsor in 1864. The last publican's license for the White Hart Inn was issued in 1874 and the building was demolished sometime during the late 1880s.

The place has potential to yield information that will contribute to an understanding of the cultural or natural history of New South Wales.

The White Hart Inn Archaeological Site is of state significance as it was only partially excavated and retains the potential to yield additional information through further archaeological investigation and research. Significant archaeological features and deposits are known to exist at the site and have been reburied and conserved. Features exposed during the excavation include the substantial sandstone and brick footings of the main inn building and detached kitchen. Archaeological deposits are also predicted to survive in deeper locations such as the cellar and cistern. The White Hart Inn Archaeological Site has the potential to reveal valuable information about the design, construction, operation and management of early inns in NSW. Information derived from the site could also be incorporated into comparative analyses with other archaeological sites and surviving inns along Windsor Road and across NSW, with the potential to reveal interesting insights into inns and inn-keeping in the early nineteenth century.

The artifacts recovered from the site thus far are typical of the kinds of items expected to have been used in a colonial inn and mainly relate to the preparation and serving of food and drinks, such as alcohol bottles and serving plates. General domestic household items were also recovered, such as toiletries and pharmaceutical bottles, clay smoking pipes, coins and buttons. A study of material culture from the site can form part of an investigation into consumption patterns and trade networks in NSW during the early nineteenth century.

The place possesses uncommon, rare or endangered aspects of the cultural or natural history of New South Wales.

Colonial inn sites are rare in NSW and have not been subject to extensive archaeological investigation and research. Little is known about the inns that once lined Windsor Road during the nineteenth century as many were abandoned and demolished following the introduction of the railway in the 1860s and subsequent decline in the demand for coach services. While there are two surviving examples of early inn buildings on Windsor Road, these inns have been subject to adaptive re-use and modifications over time, which has likely compromised their archaeological potential. The site of the former White Hart Inn remained undeveloped after its demolition sometime after 1885 and thus, provides a rare example of a mostly intact and preserved early nineteenth century inn.

The place is important in demonstrating the principal characteristics of a class of cultural or natural places/environments in New South Wales.

The White Hart Inn Archaeological Site is of state significance as it demonstrates many of the principal characteristics of colonial inns in NSW. This class of building shared a common architecture and design. The surviving archaeological remains, in the form of sandstone and brick footings, are sufficiently intact to demonstrate the typical construction and layout of inn buildings constructed in NSW during the early nineteenth century. There is potential to undertake comparative analyses with other archaeological inn sites, as well as surviving early inn buildings on Windsor Road and across NSW.

== See also ==
- List of pubs in Sydney
- Australian non-residential architectural styles
- Royal Oak Inn, Rouse Hill
