= The White Hart, South Mimms =

Pub in South Mimms, Hertfordshire, England

Coordinates: 51°41′49″N 0°14′00″W

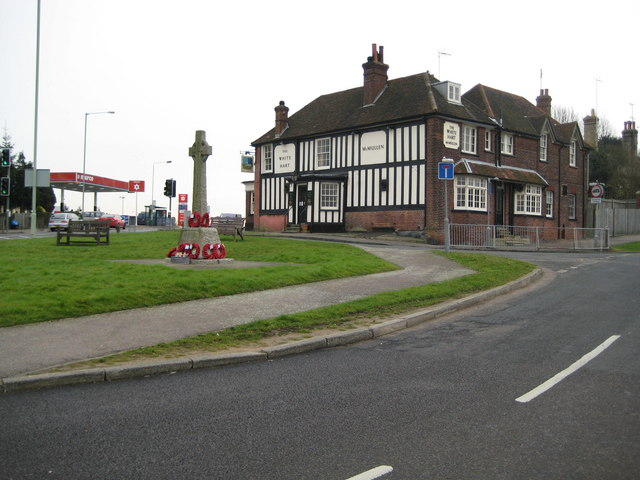
The White Hart

The White Hart is a Grade II listed public house in South Mimms, Hertfordshire, England.
