= John Haigh =

English serial killer (1909–1949)

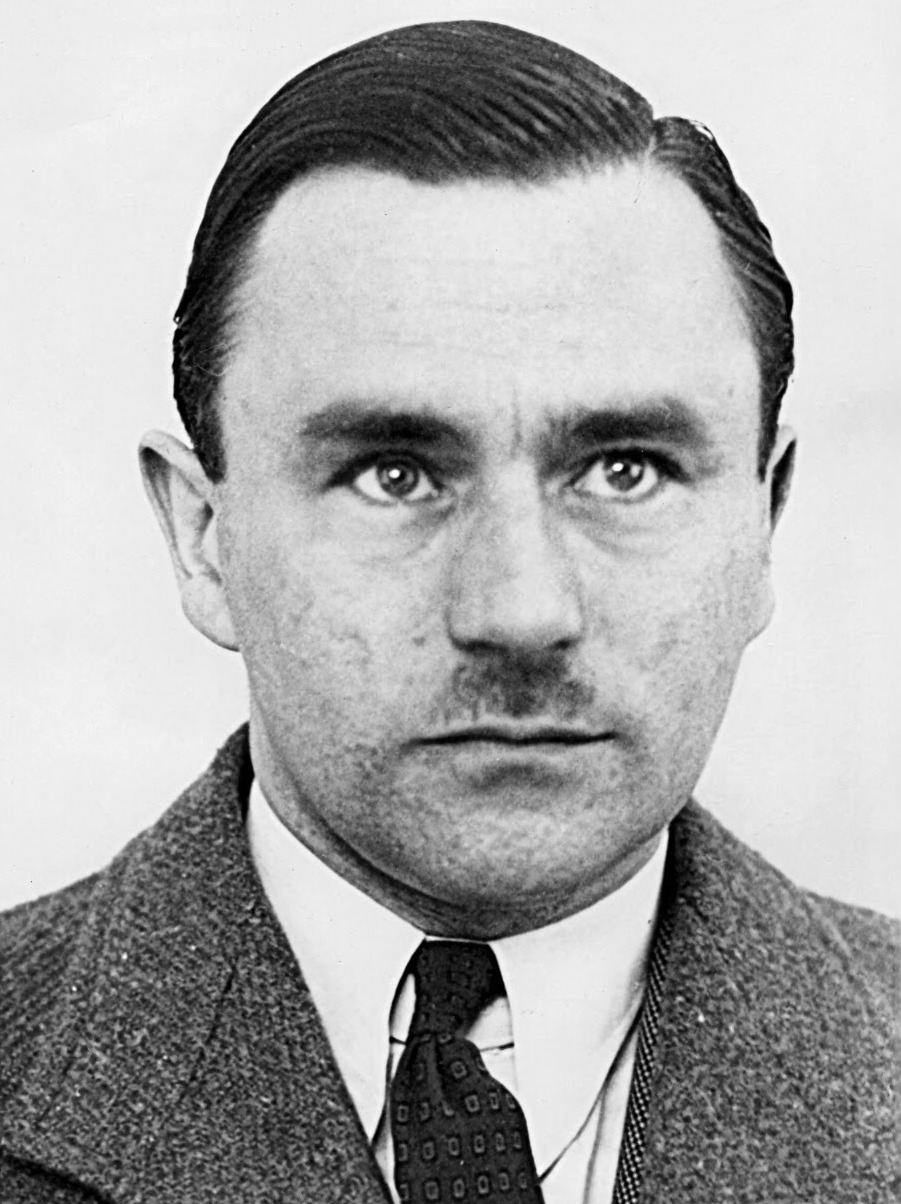
- Police photograph of Haigh in 1949
- Born: John George Haigh; 24 July 1909; Stamford, Lincolnshire, England
- Died: 10 August 1949 (aged 40); Wandsworth Prison, London, England
- Cause of death: Execution by hanging
- Other name: Acid Bath Murderer
- Motive: Profit
- Conviction: Murder
- Penalty: Death

Details
- Victims: 6–9
- Span of crimes: 1944–1949
- Country: United Kingdom
- Weapons: Lead pipe, .38 calibre Webley revolver
- Date apprehended: 1949

John George Haigh (/heɪɡ/ HEYG; 24 July 1909 – 10 August 1949), commonly known as the Acid Bath Murderer, was an English serial killer convicted for the murders of six people, although he claimed to have killed nine. Haigh battered to death or shot his victims and disposed of their bodies using sulphuric acid before forging their signatures so he could sell their possessions and collect large sums of money. His actions were the subject of the television film A Is for Acid.

== Early life ==
John Haigh was born in Stamford, Lincolnshire, and raised in the village of Outwood, West Riding of Yorkshire. His parents were engineer John Robert Haigh and his wife Emily (née Hudson), members of the Plymouth Brethren, a conservative Protestant sect. They had married late in life and Haigh was their only child.

Haigh later claimed that he suffered from recurring religious nightmares in his childhood. He developed great proficiency at the piano, which he learned at home. He was fond of classical music and often attended concerts.

Haigh won a scholarship to Queen Elizabeth Grammar School, Wakefield, then to Wakefield Cathedral, where he became a choirboy. After school, he was apprenticed to a firm of motor engineers. After a year, he left that job and took jobs in insurance and advertising. Aged 21, he was dismissed after being suspected of stealing from a cash box. After being fired, he moved on to forging car documents.

== Marriage and imprisonment ==
On 6 July 1934, Haigh married 23-year-old Beatrice 'Betty' Hamer. The marriage soon fell apart. The same year that Haigh was jailed for fraud, Betty gave birth to a baby girl while he was in prison, and she placed the baby for adoption and left Haigh. Haigh's family ostracised him from then onwards.

Haigh moved to London in 1936, and became chauffeur to William McSwan, a wealthy owner of amusement arcades. He also maintained McSwan's amusement machines. Thereafter he pretended to be a solicitor named William Cato Adamson with offices in Chancery Lane, London; Guildford, Surrey; and Hastings, Sussex. He sold fraudulent stock shares, purportedly from the estates of his deceased clients, at below-market rates. His scam was uncovered by someone who noticed he had misspelt Guildford as "Guilford" on his letterhead. Haigh received a four-year prison sentence for fraud. He was released just after the start of the Second World War; he continued as a fraudster and was sentenced to several further terms of imprisonment.

Regretting that he had left victims alive to accuse him, he became intrigued by French murderer Georges-Alexandre Sarret, who had disposed of bodies using sulphuric acid. Haigh experimented with field mice and found that it took only 30 minutes for the body to dissolve.

== "Acid bath" murders ==
Haigh was freed from prison in 1943 and became an accountant with an engineering firm. Soon after, by chance, he encountered his former employer William McSwan in a Kensington pub. McSwan introduced Haigh to his parents, Donald and Amy. McSwan worked for them by collecting rents on their London properties, and Haigh became envious of his lifestyle. On 6 September 1944, McSwan disappeared. Haigh later admitted he had lured McSwan into a basement on Gloucester Road, hit him over the head with a lead pipe, and then put his body in a 40-imperial-gallon (180 L; 48 US gal) drum with concentrated sulphuric acid. Two days later, finding that McSwan's body had mostly dissolved, Haigh emptied the drum into a manhole.

He told McSwan's parents that their son had gone into hiding in Scotland to avoid being called up for military service. Haigh then began living in McSwan's house and collecting rent for McSwan's parents. They became curious as to why their son had not returned, as the war was coming to an end. On 2 July 1945, he lured them to Gloucester Road by telling them their son was back from Scotland for a surprise visit. There he killed them with blows to the head and disposed of them. Haigh then stole McSwan's pension cheques and sold his parents' properties for around £8,000 (approximately £300,000 in 2025). He then moved into the Onslow Court Hotel in Kensington.

Haigh was a gambler. By 1947, he was running short of money. To solve his financial troubles, he found another couple to kill and rob: Archibald Henderson and his wife Rose nee Burlin. Rose had been married to German inventor Rudolph Erren.

After feigning interest in a house that they were selling, he was invited to the Hendersons' flat by Rose to play the piano for their housewarming party. While at the flat, Haigh stole Archibald Henderson's revolver, planning to use it in his next crime. Renting a small workshop at 2 Leopold Road, Crawley, West Sussex, he moved acid and drums there from Gloucester Road. (Haigh was also known to have stayed at Crawley's Hotel, The George, on several occasions.) On 12 February 1948, he drove Archibald Henderson to his workshop on the pretext of showing him an invention. When they arrived, Haigh shot Henderson in the head with the stolen revolver. Haigh then lured Rose Henderson to the workshop, claiming that her husband had fallen ill, and he shot her as well.

After disposing of the Hendersons' bodies in oil drums filled with acid, he forged a letter with their signatures and sold all of their possessions for £8,000, except for their car and dog, which he kept.

== Last victim and arrest ==
Haigh's next and last victim was Olive Durand-Deacon, 69, the wealthy widow of solicitor John Durand-Deacon and a fellow resident at the Onslow Court Hotel. Haigh by then was calling himself an engineer, and he heard Olive talk to her friends about her idea for artificial fingernails. He invited her down to the Leopold Road workshop on 18 February 1949 and, once inside, he shot her in the back of the neck with the .38 calibre Webley revolver that he had stolen from Archibald Henderson, stripped her of her valuables, including a Persian lamb coat, and put her into the acid bath. Two days later, Durand-Deacon's friend Constance Lane reported her missing.

Detectives soon discovered Haigh's record of theft and fraud and searched the workshop. Police found Haigh's attaché case containing a dry cleaner's receipt for Olive Durand-Deacon's coat, and also papers referring to the Hendersons and McSwans. The workshop in Sussex rented by Haigh did not contain a floor drain, unlike the workshop he had rented at Gloucester Road in London. He, therefore, disposed of the remains by pouring out the container on a rubble pile at the back of the property. Investigation of the area by pathologist Keith Simpson revealed 28 pounds (13 kg) of human body fat, part of a human foot, human gallstones and part of a denture which was later identified by Olive Durand-Deacon's dentist during the trial.

Haigh asked Detective Inspector Albert Webb during questioning, "Tell me, frankly, what are the chances of anybody being released from Broadmoor?" (a high-security psychiatric hospital). The inspector said that he could not discuss that sort of thing, so Haigh replied, "Well if I told you the truth, you would not believe me. It sounds too fantastic to believe."

Haigh then confessed that he had killed Durand-Deacon, the McSwans, and the Hendersons—as well as three other people: a young man called Max, a girl from Eastbourne, and a woman from Hammersmith. These claims could not be substantiated.

== Trial and execution ==
Haigh's trial was held at Lewes assizes – evidence from the trial is now in the Crime Museum at New Scotland Yard. Haigh pleaded insanity, claiming that he had drunk the blood of his victims. He said he had dreams dominated by blood as a young boy. When he was involved in a car accident in March 1944, his dream returned to him: "I saw before me a forest of crucifixes which gradually turned into trees. At first, there appeared to be dew or rain, dripping from the branches, but as I approached I realized it was blood. The whole forest began to writhe and the trees, dark and erect, to ooze blood ... A man went from [sic] each tree catching the blood ... When the cup was full, he approached me. 'Drink,' he said, but I was unable to move."

The Attorney-General, Sir Hartley Shawcross KC (later Lord Shawcross), led for the prosecution and urged the jury to reject Haigh's defence of insanity because he had acted with malice aforethought. Sir David Maxwell Fyfe KC, defending, called many witnesses to attest to Haigh's mental state, including Henry Yellowlees, who claimed Haigh had a paranoid constitution, adding: "The absolute callous, cheerful, bland and almost friendly indifference of the accused to the crimes which he freely admits having committed is unique in my experience."

Haigh had mistakenly believed that if the bodies of his victims could not be found, a murder conviction would not be possible. It took only minutes for the jury to find him guilty. Mr Justice Humphreys sentenced him to death, a sentence carried out on 10 August 1949 by executioner Albert Pierrepoint. Haigh seemed unconcerned about his fate, asking for a rehearsal of his execution so everything would go smoothly, joking about "dropping in unexpectedly" on God, and expressing the belief that he would be re-incarnated and return to the world to continue his work.

The case was one of the post-1945 cases which gained considerable coverage in the newspapers even though Haigh's guilt was not questioned. The editor of the Daily Mirror, Silvester Bolam, was sentenced to a three-month prison term for contempt of court for describing Haigh as a "murderer" while the trial was still underway. The Daily Mirror was also fined £10,000.

== Haigh's confirmed victims ==
- McSwan family:
  - William Donald McSwan (9 September 1944)
  - Donald and Amy McSwan (2 July 1945)
- Henderson couple:
  - Archibald and Rosalie Henderson (12 February 1948)
- Henrietta Helen Olivia Robarts Durand-Deacon, née Fargus (18 February 1949)

== In popular culture ==
- The release of the 1949 British film noir Obsession was delayed by the British Board of Film Censors due to similarities in its plot to the Haigh case.
- The mid-1960s unproduced Hitchcock project Kaleidoscope was inspired by both Haigh and murderer Neville Heath.
- The role of Haigh was played by Martin Clunes in the ITV drama A Is for Acid.
- In the fifth episode of the first series of British comedy series Psychoville, the character David Sowerbutts experiences a vision where waxworks of various serial killers, including Haigh, appears to come to life. During this sequence, Haigh is played by George Asprey.
- Nigel Fairs played Haigh in the Big Finish audio drama In Conversation with an Acid Bath Murderer (2011), which he also wrote. The cast included Richard Franklin as Archie Henderson, Mandi Symonds as Olive Durand-Deacon and Louise Jameson (who also directed) as Rose Henderson. It was released as the fourth instalment in their Drama Showcase anthology series.
- Stage play WAX by Michael Punter is based upon a fictional meeting between Haigh and a woman (Anna), an artist from Madame Tussauds, who models his waxwork for exhibition in the 'Chamber of Horrors' while he is in the condemned cell.

== See also ==
- List of serial killers in the United Kingdom
- Murder conviction without a body
- John Martin Scripps, another executed British serial killer and con artist.
- Teodoro García Simental, Mexican murderer and drug lord who drowned bodies (perhaps as many as 300) in sodium hydroxide.

== Additional reading ==
- Bern, Arthur J. La (1973). Haigh: The Mind of a Murderer. W. H. Allen. ISBN 978-0-491-01190-7.
- Honeycombe, Gordon (1984). The Murders of the Black Museum: 1870–1970. Wiltshire: Bloomsbury Books.
- Lane, Brian (1995). Chronicle of 20th Century Murder. Wiltshire: Select Editions. ISBN 978-0-425-14649-1.
- Root, Neil (2011). Frenzy!: Heath, Haigh and Christie. London: Arrow Books. ISBN 978-0-099-55776-0.
- The Times, court reports, 9 and 26 March 1949; 29 July 1949; 19 January 1951.
