= Rudolf Erren =

German inventor (1899–unk.)

Rudolf Arnold Erren (15 August 1899 – death date unknown) was a German engineer and inventor who did important work on the use of hydrogen fuels in the early 20th century. He had several patents, developed the Erren engine, and his work was "apparently the earliest reported use of hydrogen-engine supercharging of any kind." One of Germany's World War II U-boats supposedly had a hydrogen engine designed by Erren.

Erren was born in Prussia, served in both the German Army and Air Force during World War I, then became a police officer, and was "acquitted of a charge of murdering a superior officer." Erren was interned in Canada by the British during World War II and repatriated 28 October 1945. He may have applied for British naturalisation in 1946. He returned to Germany and remarried. Erren's research records were lost during WWII.

Erren's ex-wife Rosalie Mercy Burlin Erren Henderson (married 1931, divorced 1937) was one of John Haigh's murder victims.

The Rudolf Erren Award of the International Association of Hydrogen Energy (IAHE) is named in his honor.

== See also ==
- German submarine V-80, an experimental Nazi mini-sub fueled by hydrogen peroxide

== Selected publications ==
- Erren, R.A. and Camnbell, Vf.H., "Hydrogen: A Commercial Fuel for Internal Combustion Engines and Other Purposes", J. Inst. of Fuel (London), Vox. 6, No. 29, June 1933, pp. 277–290.
