= Alex Macdonald (trade unionist) =

Australian trade unionist

- Born: Alexander Macdonald; 21 May 1910; Greenock, Renfrewshire, Scotland
- Died: 18 August 1969 (aged 59); Princess Alexandra Hospital, South Brisbane, Australia
- Occupations: Ironworker, trade unionist
- Political party: Communist Party of Australia

Alexander Macdonald (21 May 1910 – 18 August 1969) was an Australian ironworker, trade unionist and communist.

Alex MacDonald steered trade unionism into areas such as indigenous rights, gender equality, student activism, and the peace movement. MacDonald played a significant role in Australia's trade union history.

Macdonald was born at Greenock in Renfrewshire, Scotland, to sawmill foreman Alexander Macdonald and Sybil, née Smith. Young Alex attended Homescroft School, but left at 13 to work in a shipyard. His father had remarried in 1920 following his mother's death in 1916, but the children did not get along well with their stepmother, and Alex and his sister Anna emigrated to Australia in 1925 (there was a delay of almost six weeks in Cape Town following a worldwide seamen's strike).

MacDonald, who had come to Australia as part of the "Dreadnought" scheme, trained at Scheyville for three months before working in the mid-west of New South Wales. He intended to return to Scotland via Western Australia, but reports from his father of high unemployment prompted him to remain. He travelled to Queensland in June 1932 at the height of the Great Depression and took on seasonal work, becoming involved in the unemployed workers movement. He eventually relocated to Brisbane.

Macdonald joined the Communist Party of Australia around 1933 and was elected to the state committee in 1936, becoming Brisbane branch secretary in 1937. He stood for both state and federal office several times without success. On 11 August 1939 he married Molly Cassandra Neild, a nurse, at Brisbane. Macdonald worked as an ironworker at the Evans Deakin shipyard and was elected full-time secretary of the Queensland branch of the Federated Ironworkers Association of Australia (FIA) in 1943. He was also on the interstate executive of the Australian Council of Trade Unions from 1949 to 1969, and was a supporter of Bob Hawke.

MacDonald heavily advocated for the extension of the basic wage to aboriginal workers, and for the improvement of annual, long service and sick-leave benefits, minimum wages, safety laws and pensions.

Macdonald was defeated for the secretaryship of the FIA in 1951 but became secretary of the Queensland Trades and Labor Council (TLC) in 1952. Macdonald played a significant role in the Queensland meat strike of 1946, the shearers' strike of 1956 and the Mount Isa conflict of 1964–65. He worked to admit university students to the Trades Hall and in 1968 represented the forty TLC-affiliated unions before the State Industrial Conciliation and Arbitration Commission. He died of myocardial infarction at Princess Alexandra Hospital in South Brisbane in 1969, and was cremated. His funeral was attended by thousands of mourners.
