= Studdert =

Studdert is a surname. Notable people with the surname include:

- Augustine Studdert (1901–1972), British Anglican priest
- Jack Studdert (1923–2003), Australian Army officer
- Stephen M. Studdert (born 1948), American political advisor
