= Hills District, New South Wales =

Hills District
- Region
- Country: Australia
- State: New South Wales
- City: Sydney
- LGAs: The Hills Shire; Hornsby Shire; City of Hawkesbury; City of Parramatta

Government
  - State electorates: Castle Hill; Epping; Kellyville; Winston Hills
  - Federal division: Mitchell
Regions around Hills District
Greater Blue Mountains Area	Central Coast	Central Coast
Greater Western Sydney	Hills District	North Shore
Greater Sydney	Greater Western Sydney	Northern Sydney

The Hills District (alternatively the Hills) is a region of Sydney, within the northern part of the Greater Western Sydney region of Sydney, in the state of New South Wales, Australia.

There are no formal or legal definitions of this district but a loose definition would be that it stretches from the M2 Hills Motorway in the south to the Hawkesbury River in the north and Old Windsor Road in the west to Pennant Hills Road and Berowra Creek in the east.

The Hills District is a conservative and largely white collar region.

== Geography ==
The region is named for its characteristically comparatively hilly topography as the Cumberland Plain lifts up, joining the Hornsby Plateau; and the Hawkesbury Plain lifting up and joining the same Hornsby Plateau. Several suburbs around this area have 'Hills' in their names, such as Baulkham Hills, Beaumont Hills, Castle Hill, Rouse Hill, Box Hill and Winston Hills.

== History ==
=== Aboriginal settlement ===
The Dharug People occupied the Hills and surrounding areas prior to European settlement. Rock dwellings found near the Darling Mills Creek are almost 12,000 years old. The Dharug would trade with adjacent clans like the Boorooberongal clan in the northwest. In 1789, a smallpox epidemic killed many of their numbers.

=== European settlement ===
==== Initial settlement ====
Governor Arthur Phillip surveyed the district in April 1791. His party was in search of a new area for settlement and farming to support a struggling colony in Sydney. In 1794, Hawkesbury Road, later Windsor Road, was built from the Toongabbie Government Farm to the Hawkesbury. In the same year, William Joyce, a pardoned convict, received the first land grant in the area, east of Hawkesbury Road, in what is now Baulkham Hills. He opened an inn on the same road. William Joyce Reserve is a reminder of his property.

==== Other early settlement ====
In 1799, Joseph Foveaux was granted 300 acres of land in what is now the Bella Vista area of Baulkham Hills. He sold this land to John Macarthur, and his wife, Elizabeth, the two of whom pioneered in wool manufacturing, and are attributed to starting Australia's wool industry. Part of this land was later acquired by Matthew Pearce. His farm was called 'Bella Vista Farm'. Foveaux Terrace, Elizabeth Macarthur Drive, and Macarthur Ridge Way, streets in Bella Vista; and Elizabeth Macarthur Creek starting in Kellyville are named after these early settlers. Matthew Pearce Public School, the largest in the state, is named after Matthew Pearce.

==== Government Farm in Castle Hill ====
Castle Hill Government Farm was established in 1801, and Castle Hill Heritage Park is built upon the land. It is third government farm in the country, built only twelve years after the historic grant of Experiment Farm to James Ruse. It was also a major site in the Battle of Vinegar Hill. Toongabbie Road, now Junction Road in Winston Hills, was built in the same year as the farm from Toongabbie to the junction in Baulkham Hills. Castle Hill Road was built from the junction to the farm in Castle Hill, and survives today as part of Old Northern Road and Old Castle Hill Road. The farm was turned into Australia's first lunatic asylum in 1811, until it was closed in 1826, when it was relocated to Liverpool.

==== Battle of Vinegar Hill ====
The Battle of Vinegar Hill, or Castle Hill Convict Rebellion (sometimes referred to as the Second Battle of Vinegar Hill, so as not to be confused with a rebellion of the same name in Ireland) is the historic first convict rebellion in Australia, and the only one suppressed under martial law. Vinegar Hill is located in Rouse Hill, and the rebellion occurred on 4 March 1804. Over 200 convicts escaped from a prison farm with the intent to "capture ships to sail to Ireland". Martial law was instated, and the rebels were hunted down until a truce was declared.

==== Windsor and Old Windsor Roads ====
Windsor and Old Windsor Roads are historic roads in Australia, as they are the second and third roads laid in the colony. They connect Parramatta with Windsor, but are majorly used as arterial roads for residents, especially in the Hills District. There are residential streets in Wentworthville and Westmead over the original alignment of Windsor Road. The original road started at Prospect Road, which is now the Great Western Highway. It went through the Government Farm at Toongabbie. It was widened in 1797 to 20 feet (approximately 6 metres). In 1802, Howe's Bridge was constructed at the crossing of South Creek, Windsor. In 1805, James Meehan surveyed a new alignment of the road, from Parramatta to Kellyville. This was the basis of the new Windsor Road. Governrnor Lachlan Macquarie, as part of his Parramatta Town Plan, commissioned a new toll road, which would follow Church Street across the Parramatta River, then follow the line traced by Meehan to Kellyville. This is approximately the same route that today's Windsor Road follows. This route was preferred, as it avoided many of the hills near Old Windsor Road, and the new Parramatta Government Domain, upon which Parramatta Park is built. New Windsor Road was completed in 1812, featuring 70 bridges, and was 32 feet wide (approximately 10 metres). In 1833, Windsor Road was declared a main road, maintained by public expenses. Old Windsor Road was also proclaimed a parish road. In 1835, Windsor Toll House was built, near South Creek. Bitumen for motor vehicles was laid in 1925. The upgrading for motor vehicles continued throughout the 1930s. The roads are now amongst the most well-serviced roads in the state by buses. The North-West Transit-way (NW T-way) runs along the entirety of Old Windsor Road, and along Windsor Road to Rouse Hill Town Centre.

== Population ==
According to the 2016 Census, The Hills Shire is home to 157,243 permanent residents. Of these, 50.7% were female and 49.3% were male. The exact number of residents in the Hills District would be hard to calculate as the Hills District refers to areas/suburbs in multiple LGAs.

== Environment & Climate ==
As the name indicates, the Hills District is an area of high elevation above sea level (compared with the rest of the Sydney basin) and thus creates orographic rainfall brought in by onshore winds from the Pacific Ocean. This leaves the Hills District with slightly higher rainfall than the rest of Sydney and creates a rain shadow for some places in the Blacktown district, including Marayong and Doonside. This climate characteristic was well suited to orchard production of stone fruit and citrus which proved luxuriant on the deep rich soils.

Most of the suburbs in the Hills District borderline the oceanic climate (Cfb) zone under the Köppen climate classification, as their warmest month mean may barely reach 22 °C (71.6 °F) in some years. Though they are still safely in the humid subtropical climate (Cfa) zone.

== Religion ==
The area was previously known to have the highest rate of religious service attendance in Australia and was referred to as "Sydney's Bible Belt". The Hills District repeatedly showed higher than average religious affiliation in the Australian Census, and still retains a large Christian population that represents 64.8% of religious people in the area. Despite a high Christian population, the area no longer represents the most religious region of Sydney. In the 2016 Census the Hills Shire was reported to be the tenth most religious local government area in metropolitan Sydney with 21.2% people reporting no religion.

The strong evangelical Christian tinge of the Hills District has made the region strongly conservative, a trend that runs right through local, state and Federal politics. The federal Division of Mitchell, which covers most of the area, is one of the safest seats in metropolitan Australia for the conservative Liberal Party of Australia, and all of the Hills District seats in the New South Wales Legislative Assembly are held by the NSW Liberals.

== Public transport ==
The Metro North West Line, opened in May 2019, has a frequency of every 4 minutes in the peak hour to Chatswood railway station, where passengers can change to other trains towards the city. This became a direct service to the Sydney CBD in August 2024 as part of Sydney Metro City & Southwest.

An extensive number of bus routes operate in the district, operated by Busways and CDC NSW. The region is served by the North-West T-way, connecting the Hills District with Blacktown, Parramatta and Rouse Hill.

The now closed Carlingford railway line operated by Sydney Trains has been converted into light rail as part of the Parramatta Light Rail project.

== Suburbs ==
- Arcadia
- Annangrove
- Baulkham Hills
- Bella Vista
- Beaumont Hills
- Box Hill
- Carlingford
- Castle Hill
- Cattai
- Cherrybrook
- Dural
- Gables
- Galston
- Glenhaven
- Glenorie
- Kellyville
- Kenthurst
- Leets Vale
- Lower Portland
- Maraylya
- Maroota
- Middle Dural
- Nelson
- North Kellyville
- Norwest
- North Rocks
- Pennant Hills
- Rouse Hill
- Sackville North
- South Maroota
- West Pennant Hills
- Winston Hills
- Wisemans Ferry

== Media ==
The Hills district is served by a number of local printed newspapers: including: The Hills to Hawkesbury Community News, The Hills Independent, The Galston Glenorie & Hills Rural News and the Dooral Roundup.

News Local newspapers have ceased printing and can only be accessed online. The only title left is the Hills Shire Times.

The local community radio station for the district is Alive 90.5 which is based in Baulkham Hills and also broadcasts to Parramatta and Cumberland.
