= Australian contribution to UNTAC in Cambodia 1992–93 =

The United Nations Transitional Authority in Cambodia (UNTAC) was a peacekeeping mission established in the early 1990s following the civil war which broke out in Cambodia after the collapse of the Khmer Rouge regime in 1979. The Australian government had closely followed events in Cambodia given the possible implications for regional security, while out of a desire to be seen as a good international citizen it had also invested heavily diplomatically in order to push the parties towards a peace agreement. In August 1989 the UN attempted to broker a peace agreement between the warring factions, and included amongst the reconnaissance party were two Australian officers tasked with laying the groundwork for a monitoring force should it be deployed. However, after the collapse of the peace effort the proposed UN force was cancelled and the reconnaissance team withdrawn.

Two years later, however, following the Paris Agreements in 1991 UNTAC was successfully established to monitor a new ceasefire and elections which were initially planned for March 1992. UNTAC was the largest and most complex UN operation since the Congo in the 1960s, comprising 16,000 troops, 900 military observers, 3,350 civilian police and several thousand civilian staff. The Australian contingent served from the inception of the mission in late 1991 until it withdrew in November 1993, and at its height numbered 600 personnel. Approximately 1,215 Australians served in Cambodia, and although they suffered a number of casualties, none were killed during the mission.

== UNAMIC ==
The Australian contribution initially included an advance party of 65 communications personnel under the United Nations Advance Mission in Cambodia (UNAMIC). The first 40 signallers arrived in Phnom Penh on 10 November 1991, the day after UNAMIC headquarters opened. They were commanded by Lieutenant Colonel Russell Stuart, who became the mission's first casualty on 26 February 1992 when he was wounded after the helicopter he was travelling in was hit by ground fire close to the Thai border. Later the commitment was increased to 65 signallers.

== UNTAC ==
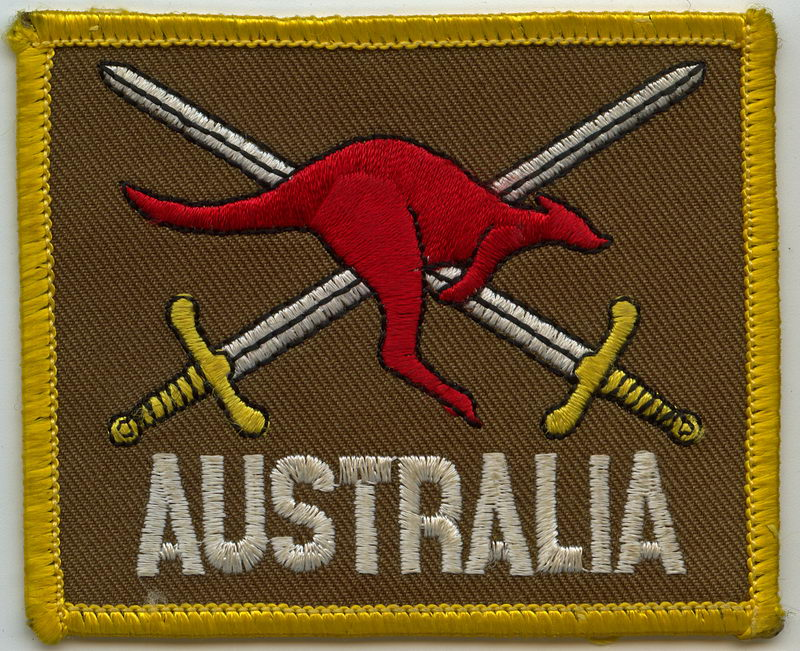
Australian Army Patch - UNTAC

The ADF ultimately contributed a force of 600 personnel to UNTAC, including 488 in the Force Communications Unit (FCU), which was tasked with providing communications infrastructure—including HF radio, telex, telephone, courier services and data transfer—for the mission across fifty-six locations throughout the country. The first rotation of the FCU was composed largely of Army signallers from 2 Signals Regiment and was commanded Lieutenant Colonel Steve Ayling. Later the FCU was made up of signallers from the Royal Australian Air Force and Royal Australian Navy, as well as 40 New Zealanders; Ayling was subsequently succeeded by Lieutenant Colonel Marty Studdert. A thirty-man movement control unit and a twenty-man military police unit were subsequently added later. Whilst a ten-man Australian Federal Police (AFP) was also provided to assist in the restoration of law and order. A further 115 personnel, comprising six S-70A Blackhawk helicopters and their crews drawn from 5th Aviation Regiment, as well as a small number of infantry from 2nd/4th Battalion, Royal Australian Regiment (2/4 RAR), were deployed from May–July 1993. During the election itself the Australian Electoral Commission provided 50 staff to assist with voter registration.

Initially it had been suggested by the Australian Minister for Defence, Robert Ray, that Australia would provide up to 1,300 personnel to UNTAC when it took over—including an engineering squadron—however by the time the UN formally made its request in February 1992 the offer was reduced to 550. UNTAC subsequently took over in May and the main body of Australian personnel arrived in Phnom Penh in April–June 1992, taking over a large disused barracks as their base—dubbed Pteah Australii or "home of the Australians". Australian personnel deployed to Cambodia served tours of varying length, between five and thirteen months long, whilst some officers serving in UNTAC headquarters served even longer.

Australia also provided the force commander, Lieutenant General John Sanderson, being only the second occasion in which Australia provided the commander of a UN mission. Sanderson's task was a difficult one, as not only did the Khmer Rouge attempt to disrupt the mission, the troops under his command also proved hard to manage. Indeed, at one time Sanderson even faced death threats from a number of members of the Bulgarian contingent over pay and conditions. As the mission progressed the dangers increased, with the Khmer Rouge attacking UNTAC personnel on a number of occasions, and killing a group of Bulgarian soldiers, as well as a Japanese electoral worker and his interpreter.

The Australian contingent, consisting mainly of support troops, saw little action in the traditional sense, although it too had to face its share of danger. On at least one occasion infantry from 2/4 RAR had to defend themselves after becoming involved in a night-time contact at the helicopter base at Battambang after a Mi-26 heavy lift helicopter received ground fire when returning to land. A number of individuals in the FCU—often deployed in small groups in isolated parts of the country as they were—also had lucky escapes after being caught in contacts between warring factions, in artillery barrages and even being taken hostage by the Khmer Rouge.

== Withdrawal ==
By mid-1993 the refugee camps along the Thai border had been closed and more the 337,000 displaced persons resettled, most eligible voters had been registered, more than 250,000 former soldiers disarmed and a program of demining initiated. UNTAC had also successfully extended its security umbrella through widespread patrolling, the confiscation of weapons and other measures to reduce banditry, whilst the Khmer Rouge had also been sidelined, even if it continued to poss a threat. The elections were successfully held between 23 and 28 May 1993, and by November 1993 the United Nations withdrew from Cambodia altogether.

Arguably the mission to Cambodia represented a significant change in Australian thinking towards peacekeeping, and its level of commitment. Previously, although a frequent contributor to UN operations, Australia had contributed small numbers of individual personnel to fill technical positions (e.g. signals, engineers or medical personnel) or as observers, however in Cambodia the ADF deployed a significant sized force, albeit again providing higher level technically qualified personnel and support staff, rather than combat troops. This approach however, placed significant strain on the ADF, with the mission denuding it of the bulk of its communications specialists. Subsequently, Australia became increasingly involved in UN peacekeeping operations throughout the mid-1990s, deploying significant forces—including combat troops—to Somalia and Rwanda, and later still to East Timor.

Approximately 1,215 Australians served in Cambodia, and although they suffered a number of casualties, none were killed during the mission.
