= Box Hill, New South Wales =

Box Hill
- Suburb
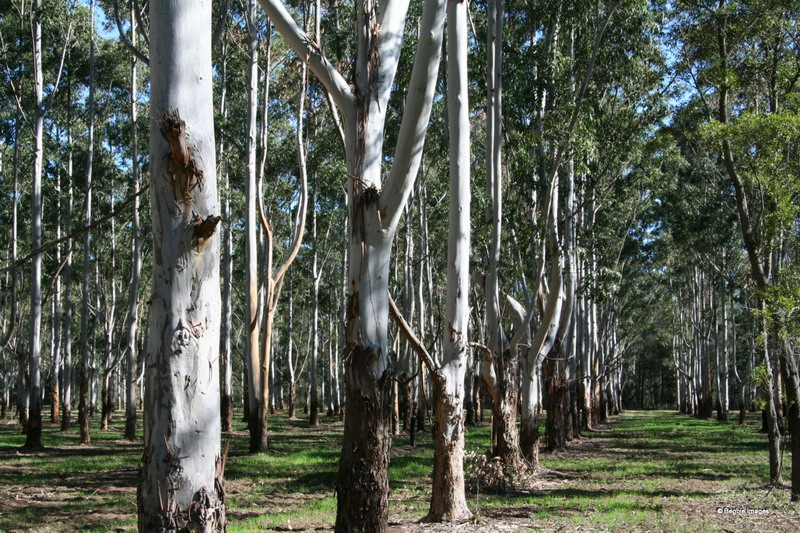
- Box Wood plantation in Box Hill

- Interactive map of Box Hill
- Coordinates: 33°39′S 150°53′E
- Country: Australia
- State: New South Wales
- City: Sydney
- LGA: The Hills Shire
- Location: 48 km (30 mi) NW of Sydney CBD

Government
  - State electorate: Hawkesbury
  - Federal division: Greenway
- Elevation: 39 m (128 ft)

Population
  - Total: 6,450 (SAL 2021)
- Postcode: 2765
Suburbs around Box Hill
Scheyville	Gables	Kenthurst
Oakville	Box Hill	Nelson
Vineyard	Riverstone	Rouse Hill

Box Hill is a suburb of Sydney, in the state of New South Wales, Australia. Box Hill is located 48 kilometres north-west of the Sydney central business district in the local government area of The Hills Shire and is part of the Hills District region.

Box Hill is a rapidly growing new release area of The Hills Shire Council in North West Sydney. Box Hill Precinct is planned under the NSW Government's North West Priority Growth Area along with other release areas, such as North Kellyville.

The area, which was rezoned in 2013, is bordered by Boundary Road to the west, Annangrove Road to the east, Old Pitt Town Road to the north and Windsor Road to the south. By completion Box Hill will be home to approximately 42,480 residents (13,276 dwellings).

In July 2020, a portion of Box Hill in the north was carved out and became the separate suburb of Gables. It also absorbed two small areas of Rouse Hill.

== Heritage listings ==
Box Hill has a number of heritage-listed sites, including:

- 10 Terry Road: Box Hill House
- Windsor Road: Box Hill Inn

== Demographics ==
According to the 2021 census of population, there were 6450 people in Box Hill. 53.4% of people were born in Australia and 50.7% of people spoke only English at home. The most common responses for religion in Box Hill were Catholic 26.4%, No Religion 19.9%, Hinduism 14.9% and Anglican 6.7%.
