= Maraylya =

- Suburb
- Interactive map of Maraylya
- Coordinates: 33°35′52″S 150°54′58″E
- Country: Australia
- State: New South Wales
- City: Sydney
- LGAs: The Hills Shire; City of Hawkesbury
- Location: 43 km (27 mi) north-west of Sydney CBD

Government
  - State electorate: Hawkesbury
  - Federal divisions: Macquarie; Greenway; Berowra
- Elevation: 27 m (89 ft)

Population
  - Total: 1,281 (2021 census)
- Postcode: 2765
Suburbs around Maraylya
Pitt Town	Cattai	Glenorie
Scheyville	Maraylya	Kenthurst
Oakville	Gables	Annangrove

Maraylya is a suburb of Sydney, in the state of New South Wales, Australia. Maraylya is located 43 kilometres (27 mi) north-west of the Sydney central business district in the local government area of The Hills Shire and the City of Hawkesbury. Maraylya is bounded in the north and the east by Cattai Creek. The western part of Maraylya is prone to flooding after heavy rains, particularly from run-off from the Scheyville National Park. The flood waters make their way to Longneck Lagoon, which eventually drains into the Hawkesbury River less than 2 km to the west. Maraylya consists mainly of small-acreage properties used as hobby farms and for keeping horses for recreational purposes. Scheyville National Park adjoins the southern border of Maraylya and is popular for horse trail rides for local residents. There is an arena in the area called the Horseworld Sportsworld Equestrian Stadium.

In July 2020, a small section of Maraylya in the south was carved out and formed the new suburb of Gables.
