= Annangrove =

- Suburb
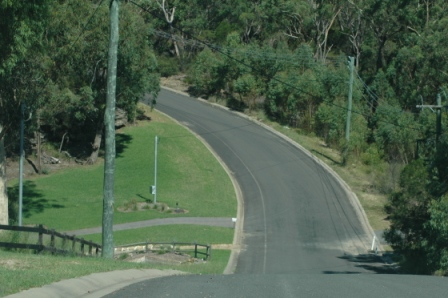
- Hill Climb Drive, Annangrove in 2008

- Interactive map of Annangrove
- Coordinates: 33°39′09″S 150°56′27″E
- Country: Australia
- State: New South Wales
- City: Sydney
- LGA: The Hills Shire
- Location: 42 km (26 mi) north-west of Sydney CBD

Government
  - State electorate: Castle Hill
  - Federal division: Mitchell
- Elevation: 86 m (282 ft)

Population
  - Total: 1,472 (SAL 2021)
- Postcode: 2156
Suburbs around Annangrove
Gables	Maraylya	Kenthurst
Nelson	Annangrove	Kenthurst
Rouse Hill	Kellyville	Kenthurst

Annangrove is a suburb of Sydney, in the state of New South Wales, Australia 42 kilometres north-west of the Sydney central business district in the local government area of The Hills Shire and part of the Hills District region.

== History ==
The original inhabitants of the Annangrove area were the Dharug people.

The first British settler in the area that is now Annangrove was Stephen Cusbert, who settled there in the early 1860s.

Annangrove was founded by Edward Charles Johnston, grandson of George Johnston. The town was named after Annan, Scotland where George Johnston was born. Edward first bought land in Annangrove in 1893. By 1895 the local post office and school had taken the name Annangrove. Though the use of the name Annan Grove was also common at this time.

Annangrove was originally used by for logging, before orchards were planted there.

On 20 October 1896 the Annangrove Church of England was opened. It joined the Provisional Parish of Dural in 1939.

The first telephone in Annangrove was officially opened in July 1914. The next year, in November 1915, Annangrove was struck by a bushfire. The hills near Blue Gum Creek, which separates Annangrove and Kenthurst, were burnt bare of trees.

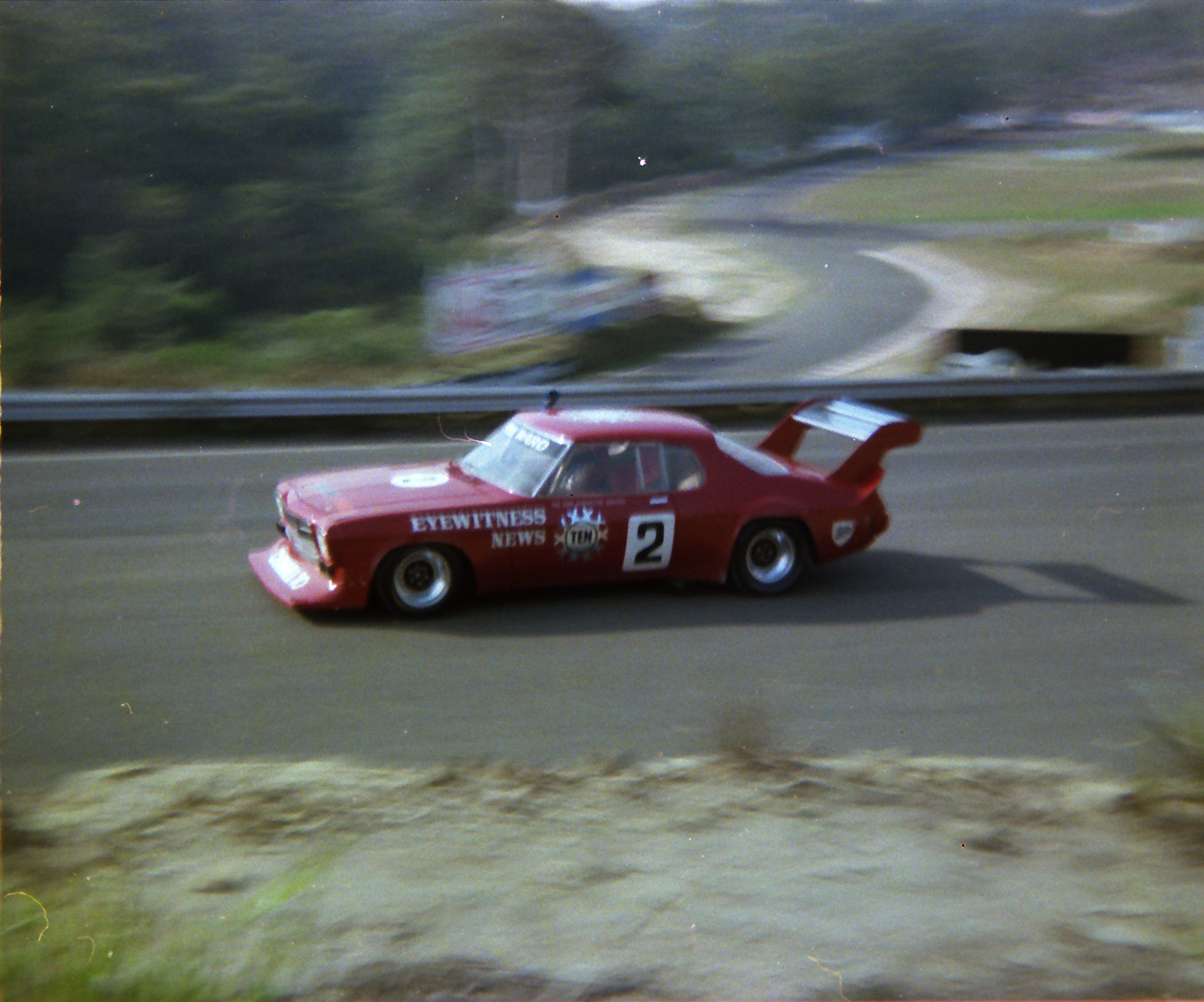
Phil Ward races at Amaroo Park in 1980

In 1963 Amaroo Park Raceway opened in Annangrove., it continued to operate until the final race was held there on 23 August 1998.

By 1978 Annangrove had a population of 400.

== Places of worship ==
- Sydney Zoroastrian Fire Temple is located at 196 Annangrove Road.
- Imam Hasan Centre, a Muslim prayer centre (Hussainia) for Shia Muslims in Sydney, opened 16 October 2004.

== Demographics ==
According to the 2021 census of Population, there were 1,472 residents in Annangrove. 80.9% of people were born in Australia and 86.7% of people only spoke English at home. The most common responses for religious affiliation were Catholic 40.8%, No Religion 19.7% and Anglican 14.8%.

== Parks and recreation ==
There is a major park called Annangrove Park Reserve (a.k.a. Annangrove Park Sportsground).

It is a multi-use reserve featuring a grassed field with a synthetic cricket pitch in the centre, two synthetic tennis courts, a children's playground, Scouts & Girl Guides hall and a picnic shelter.

The reserve space to the north and west are threatened species areas in which no activities are allowed.

The soccer fields are the home ground of Box Hill Rangers AFC who play within the Hills Football competition.
