= Officer Training Unit, Scheyville =

Australian Army training establishment

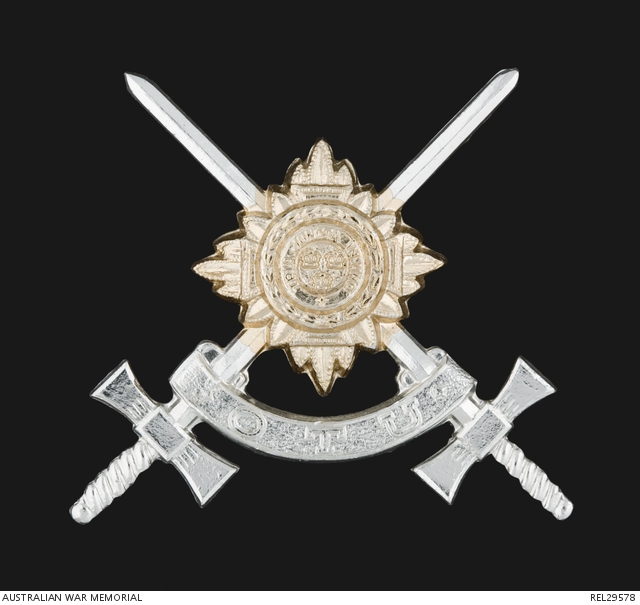
- OTU Cap Badge
- Motto: Here Men Are Made
- Type: Military college
- Active: 1 April 1965–June 30, 1974
- Location: Scheyville, New South Wales, Australia; 33°36′40″S 150°53′13″E
- Website: otu.asn.au

The Officer Training Unit, Scheyville (OTU Scheyville, pronounced Skyville) was a military training establishment for officers of the Australian Army. Located in the area of Scheyville in the Hawkesbury region of Sydney, Australia, the establishment was opened in April 1965 to train officer cadets who had been called up for service under the national service scheme and offered a short but rigorous commissioning course for trainees, tailored to meet the Army's need to increase the number of junior officers being produced in order to meet commitments to train national servicemen, and to provide platoon commanders for units serving overseas in Vietnam and other parts of Southeast Asia. It was closed in 1974 after the national service scheme was abolished in December 1972 and the last OCS Portsea class finished their time at Scheyville.

== History ==
On 24 November 1964, the National Service Act was passed by the Australian Federal parliament, allowing the Menzies government to re-establish the national service scheme – which had been suspended in 1959 – as a response to growing uncertainty in Australia's strategic outlook in Southeast Asia. Unlike previous versions of national or compulsory service, which had limited the liability of men called up to service in Australian territory within the meaning of the Defence Act (1903) only, the new scheme envisaged conscripted soldiers serving in Regular Army units to bolster their numbers for deployment being sent overseas to meet Australia's commitments in Southeast Asia. Many would take part in the fighting Vietnam and Malaysia.

Although largely opposed by the Australian Army hierarchy, the reintroduction of conscription necessitated a requirement for the expansion of the Army's training establishments to meet the increased numbers of men undergoing training. This, coupled with the expansion of the Royal Australian Regiment to nine battalions, meant that there was a need for the Army to increase the numbers of junior officers serving in its ranks in order to oversee the training of national servicemen and to command platoons on operations overseas. To meet this requirement the decision was made to create a new Officer Training Unit (OTU) to deliver this course. At the same time the decision was taken to train pilots for the Army at OTU. Colonel (later Brigadier) Ian Geddes was given the responsibility of bringing this organisation into being, and on 1 April 1965 the OTU was established at Scheyville, New South Wales.

Approximately 50 kilometres (31 mi) north-west of Sydney, the land had originally been used as part of the Dreadnought agricultural training scheme, before being used during the First World War as an internment camp for "enemy aliens". Later, during the Second World War the Army had used the site for conducting training exercises before it was converted in 1949 into a camp for migrants.

Because there was a requirement to expand the size of the Army quickly, out of necessity the course offered by Scheyville was much shorter than those offered at the other officer training establishments. Whereas officers were produced over the course of eleven months at Officer Cadet School, Portsea and four years at Royal Military College, Duntroon, the OTU course was condensed into 22 weeks. From the outset the course was designed to be physically demanding and mentally challenging, and each lesson was designed to instil a number of teaching points in order to meet the requirements of the syllabus. It was a hectic schedule, and the cadets were required to work up to 14 hours a day, without weekends off in the first month. As a result, many cadets did not pass; indeed the OTU had a failure rate of around 30 per cent. Those who did not pass were removed from the course and completed their national service obligation as an other rank, although many quickly progressed through the ranks to become junior non-commissioned officers. Cadets who did successfully complete the course were commissioned as second lieutenants. The majority were allocated to the infantry, although graduates were posted to all corps of the Army and went on to serve in Vietnam, Papua New Guinea, Malaysia and Singapore, as well as throughout Australia.

The abolition of National Service in December 1972 by the Whitlam government meant that there was no longer a requirement for an accelerated commissioning course and OTU Scheyville was finally closed in April 1974. Officer training in the Australian Army would continue at RMC Duntroon and OCS Portsea, although Portsea was itself closed in 1985 when RMC Duntroon took on the role of providing the 18-month commissioning course and the Australian Defence Force Academy was established to provide tertiary education. During the course of its operation OTU Scheyville produced 1,871 officers for the ARA or RAS (NS). 10 CMF Officers also graduated at OTU. Of these, the majority were national servicemen, although 68 were members of the Regular Army who attended Scheyville in this time. These Regular Army officers, however, went to OCS Portsea at the end of their Scheyville course to graduate as OCS Portsea officers (1/72, 2/72 and 1/73 OCS (S) courses); in fact, the last cadets at Scheyville were the Regulars who graduated (at OCS Portsea) eight months after the last national service officer cadets graduated. Relations between the national service and Regular cadets were very friendly. The failure rate for these regulars was similar to the national service cadets. A total of 97 OCS (S) cadets commenced the three courses with 68 graduating. During the same period of time, 1,287 officers graduated from Portsea and 465 graduated from the Royal Military College, Duntroon.

=== Alumni ===
Over 360 Scheyville graduates served in Vietnam, eight of whom were killed in action. (Note: Some sources give the figure of seven, rather than eight.) Gordon Sharp was the first OTU trained officer to be killed in Vietnam while serving with the 6th Battalion, Royal Australian Regiment at the Battle of Long Tan on 18 August 1966. It was Sharp's platoon that suffered the majority of fatalities in that battle after he himself was killed at its beginning. Of the 1,699 national service officers produced, around 300 later chose to join the Regular Army, while many continued to serve in the Citizen Military Force (CMF – later the Army Reserve) thus ensuring the continuing legacy of the OTU within the Australian Army into the 1980s and well beyond. One Scheyville graduate rose to the rank of major general in the Reserve while 14 reached the rank of brigadier, with a couple still serving as late as 2002, even though during their training they had been told that it was unlikely they would be promoted past major. One graduate, Brigadier Peter Pursey, AM, served for a time as Commandant of the Royal Military College, Duntroon.

A number of graduates also rose to prominence in civilian life. Some of the most notable examples include Jeff Kennett, who became Premier of Victoria, and Tim Fischer, who served as Deputy Prime Minister of Australia. There were also a number of other parliamentarians, broadcasters, journalists and academics.

== See also ==
- Royal Military College, Duntroon
- Australian Defence Force Academy
- Officer Cadet School, Portsea
- Scheyville National Park
