= Oakville, New South Wales =

Oakville
- Suburb
- Interactive map of Oakville
- Coordinates: 33°37′20″S 150°52′1″E
- Country: Australia
- State: New South Wales
- City: Sydney
- LGA: City of Hawkesbury
- Location: 49 km (30 mi) north-west of Sydney CBD

Government
  - State electorate: Hawkesbury
  - Federal division: Macquarie
- Elevation: 37 m (121 ft)

Population
  - Total: 2,027 (2021 census)
- Postcode: 2765
Suburbs around Oakville
Pitt Town Bottoms	Pitt Town	Scheyville
McGraths Hill	Oakville	Gables
Vineyard	Riverstone	Box Hill

Oakville is a suburb of the City of Hawkesbury, in the state of New South Wales, Australia. Oakville is located 49 kilometres north-west of the Sydney central business district in the local government area of the City of Hawkesbury.

== Education ==
- Arndell Anglican College
- Oakville Public School

== Landmarks ==
- Scheyville National Park
- Killarney Chain of Ponds
- McKenzies Creek

== Pop culture ==
Clare House, a building on Clare Crescent in Oakville, is famous for its use as the "Wandin Valley Bush Nursing Hospital" in the long running Channel 7 television series A Country Practice (1981–1994).
