= Box Hill House =

- Location within Sydney Location within Australia
- 33°39′18″S 150°53′38″E
- Location: 10 Terry Road, Box Hill, The Hills Shire, New South Wales, Australia

History
- Built: 1819–1897

New South Wales Heritage Register
- Official name: Box Hill House in grounds of McCall gardens; McCall Garden Colony; McCall Gardens; Box Hill estate
- Type: State heritage (complex / group)
- Designated: 2 April 1999
- Reference no.: 613
- Type: Pastoralism
- Category: Farming and Grazing
- Builders: Samuel Terry; George Terry

Box Hill House is a heritage-listed former hunting grounds and farm estate and now residential support home at 10 Terry Road, Box Hill, New South Wales, a suburb of Sydney, Australia. It was built from 1819 to 1897 by Samuel Terry and George Terry. It is also known as McCall Garden Colony, Box Hill House in grounds of McCall gardens, McCall Gardens and Box Hill estate. The property is privately owned. It was added to the New South Wales State Heritage Register on 2 April 1999.

The house is located in the grounds of McCall Gardens, a non-profit organisation that provides residential and support services to people living with a physical disability.

== History ==
Samuel Terry (1776–1838) arrived in the colony of New South Wales as a convict in 1801 and amassed a fortune through banking and property interests. At one stage he was the richest man in the colony and a co-founder of the Bank of New South Wales.

The 690-hectare (1,700-acre) Box Hill estate, a property on the north-eastern side of Windsor Road from Rouse Hill, was granted to Robert Fitz in 1816.

On the nearby Rouse Hill estate, Richard Rouse built Rouse Hill House from 1813 to 1820 using convict labour.

In 1819 the Box Hill estate was transferred to Samuel Terry (the "Botany Bay Rothschild") after Fitz fell into financial difficulties. Terry used Box Hill estate as his country seat. His estate was noted in the General Post Office Directory of 1832 (p. 73) as a "country seat".

At the time of the transfer the estate included an adjoining 210-hectare (530-acre) paddock fenced with a five rail fence.

Eleanor Rouse (1813–98) of nearby Rouse Hill estate, married John Terry, son of Samuel Terry in 1831. They made their home at Box Hill and the proximity of the two properties was to lead to further links between the two families. It is thought that Richard Rouse built the stables at Box Hill for his daughter Eleanor, although documentary evidence of this appears scarce.

Samuel Terry died in 1838 and the bulk of his property was left to his son, Edward Terry. However John Terry retained control of Box Hill. The estate was considerably enlarged in 1839 with acquisition of a nearby 400-hectare (1,000-acre) property, Copenhagen, from the family of former Governor, William Bligh.

John Terry died, aged 31, in a fall from a horse in November 1842 leaving three sons, Samuel Henry, Richard Rouse and Edward. Box Hill was passed on to Samuel Henry Terry. IT was during this period that wheat was grown at Box Hill and Samuel Terry's foreman was Charles Hynds, an English yeoman who lived on the estate for about 50 years and was forebear of the Hynds family in the area.

An adjoining property of 61 hectares (150 acres) on Windsor Road, Mount Jamison, owned by James Connor, was offered for sale in 1842. The property description gives valuable insight into the spatial organisation of the homesteads of the area, having a verandah cottage of five rooms with fenced 1/2 acre garden and orchard in front; men's huts and other outbuildings; a two-room slab building for the overseer; large shed for storing grain; and a chain of ponds supplying water.

In 1856 Eleanor married Major Wingate and became known (to the Rouses) as "Aunt Wingate" at Rouse Hill, and "Grandma Wingate" at Box Hill. Major Wingate died in 1869 and Grandma Wingate lived on for nearly 30 years at Percy Lodge, Potts Point.

Samuel Henry Terry died in 1887 and the estate was left to his son, George A.Terry (1871–1957). In late 1888 the district experienced severe drought, with the small water supply at Box Hill failing and much of the area depending on the supply at Rouse Hill. Much of Box Hill estate was burnt by bushfire. By 1889 it was noted that both Box Hill and Rouse Hill were "surrounded by open grass paddocks, which at one time were in high cultivation for cereals, but which have latterly been devoted to grazing purposes".

George A. Terry married Nina Rouse (1875–1968) in 1895 but did not move into Box Hill House immediately. They lived at Rouse Hill House for over a year while Box Hill House was being rebuilt and renovated for them, together with the Stable and the billiard room which was on top of it (early 1897 it was ready). The main part of the house, which is believed to have been of weatherboard, was demolished and replaced by a very gracious brick bungalow which survives (1988). Their son, Gerald George Rouse, who grew up at Box Hill, believed that there had been an even earlier house there before the weatherboard one.

Initial plans for a grand residence had to be down-scaled, but at least 30,000 bricks were used and four rooms of the original house were retained.

George Terry was an avid hunter and horseman and in 1891 the Box Hill Race Club held a New Year's Day meet on the estate. In 1894 the Box Hill Picnic Races were held, where guests were served lunch under the old trees at the homestead. In July 1895 the Sydney Hunt Club met for a "run" over the Box Hill country, as "Vandorian" (i.e., Margaret Cox-Taylor) put it in a long report called "A Day with the Hounds". A photograph of the occasion still hangs at Rouse Hill House. Later the Club's hunting hound kennels were kept at Box Hill. He was master of the Sydney Hunt Club by 1907 and figured in an article by "First Check" published in The Lone Hand.

Hunts were held on Box Hill and neighbouring properties and descriptions of hunts at Box Hill refer to numerous paddocks with high fences used for steeplechasing. There was also a designated racecourse on a flat paddock lying between Windsor and Terry Roads.

George and Nina moved into Box Hill house in early 1897. The kitchen buildings were not new, but neither were they the original ones on site. Of the original buildings only the stables and the underground tank remained essentially as they were. The complex had (and has) a commanding position on top of a sizeable small hill, looking across west to the Blue Mountains, and surveying the surrounding district.

George and Nina had five sons, the first having been born at Rouse Hill before they moved into Box Hill.

George Terry ran sheep, having as many as 4000 head and 100 bales of wool in the shed. Terry Road was a private driveway, with a white gate near Windsor Road, terminating at the homestead.

In 1899 two Chinese gardeners established a market garden on a portion of the estate.

In 1906 there was an armed confrontation between George Terry and two employees, and a group of thieves trying to steal pigs from the piggery.

George borrowed some A£6,000 to do the homestead rebuilding, and this large sum, coupled with his rather extravagant lifestyle and spending, proved troublesome for the family, given that the pasture on the c.810-hectare (2,000-acre) estate was not the best and careful farming would not have yielded high income. Lacking any training, his troubles with borrowing money led to his mortgaging all his properties, Box Hill's subdivision and sale and George's eventual bankruptcy.

Financial difficulties led to Box Hill estate's subdivision into 170 farm allotments and sale via the agent Henry F. Halloran in 1919. The immediate homestead property of 86 hectares (212 acres) was preserved. As part of the subdivision, Terry Road was extended through to Old Pitt Town Road. Three of the new allotments contained existing buildings: two were on Nelson Road and one on Hynds Road.

The family continued to live at Box Hill for a time, but in great stringency. The homestead block of 86 hectares (212 acres) was transferred to Nina, who had to borrow money to buy it. At times the Terry's had no food to eat, and George's cousin Jack Terry came to the rescue more than once. The five sons however were unprepared and lacked financial backing for their education and future prospects. Nina herself was declared bankrupt in 1928.

After Bessie Rouse died in 1924 Box Hill House and its 86 hectares (212 acres) were sold to Mr. Neville and George and Nina Terry moved to Rouse Hill House. George was employed on the property as a labourer, Nina as a cook.

In 1941 there was an important auction sale of dairy cattle, farming and dairy plant on the estate, indicating the days of Box Hill being a viable, working estate were over.

The southern and eastern portions of the remaining property were later subdivided. In 1956 the then owner of Box Hill, William McCall, donated the house with a curtilage of 16 hectares (40 acres) to the Subnormal Children's Welfare Association to established the McCall Garden Community to care for boys with disabilities.

George Terry died on 24 July 1957, aged 85.

During the 1970s the care facility was greatly expanded, initially with the purchase of old trams, and later by construction of kitchen and accommodation blocks.

== Description ==
A simple brick 1890s farm house with stone-flagged verandahs, now much extended for institutional use. A two-storey brick building behind the house. Owned by the Sub Normal Children's Association.

The complex is positioned on top of a small hill, Box Hill, north-east of Windsor Road, looking across west to the Blue Mountains, and surveying the surrounding district with good views to Rouse Hill house complex to its southeast.

=== Modifications and dates ===
The original weatherboard house was rebuilt and renovated between 1895 and 1897 and replaced by a very gracious brick bungalow which survives (in 1988), together with the Stables and the billiard room which was on top of it. Gerald George Rouse who grew up at Box Hill believed that there had been an even earlier house there before the weatherboard one.

The kitchen buildings were not new in 1897, but neither were they the original ones on site. Of the original buildings only the stables and the underground tank remained at that time. At this time it was a c.810-hectare (2,000-acre) estate.

1921 – subdivision and sale of the estate via the agent H. F. Halloran, except for the homestead block of 86 hectares (212 acres).

1924 – sale of 86-hectare (212-acre) homestead block.

Since then it has been much extended for institutional use, obscuring the view of the brick house.

== Heritage listing ==
As at 26 September 2016, Box Hill house and the remains of its former farm estate has historic and social significance as the former country seat of the "Botany Bay Rothschild" Samuel Terry and for its long associations with the farm estates and fluctuating fortunes of the Terry and Rouse families of this district. Despite later modifications the original house dates from the 1820s. It has aesthetic significance as a prominent early estate located on a hill top along Windsor Road.

Box Hill House in grounds of McCall gardens was listed on the New South Wales State Heritage Register on 2 April 1999.

== See also ==
- Australian residential architectural styles
