= Jack Studdert =

John Handcock Studdert
- Studdert at the graduation from the Royal Military College of his eldest son, Martin, in December 1978.
- Born: 20 December 1923; Bungonia, New South Wales
- Died: 18 February 2003 (aged 79)
- Military career
- Allegiance: Australia
- Branch: Australian Army
- Service years: 1943–1978
- Rank: Brigadier
- Unit: Royal Australian Artillery
- Commands: Deputy Chief of Materiel; Officer Training Unit, Scheyville; 4th Field Regiment
- Conflicts: Second World War
- Awards: Officer of the Order of Australia; Officer of the Order of the British Empire
- Other work: Farmer; New South Wales Rural Fire Service

Brigadier John Handcock Studdert, AO, OBE (20 December 1923 – 18 February 2003) was an Australian Army officer, and in retirement a farmer and organiser of his local Rural Fire Service (RFS) branch. He is best remembered for his service as the Commandant of the Officer Training Unit Scheyville.

== Early years ==
Jack Studdert was born in Bungonia, New South Wales in December 1923, the oldest son of Charles Handcock Studdert and Bertha Geraldine Cripps-Clark. His father was born at Danganelly House in County Clare, Ireland, emigrated to Australia in 1912, and was the manager of the Spring Ponds property at Bungonia.

Before his father's death in 1936, John (known as Pat to his family) moved with his parents, sister Vivien and brother Charles (known as Mick), to their own property (which Charles senior named Danganelly after his birthplace), on the banks of the Wollondilly River at Towrang, about 15 km north of Goulburn. John was educated at Goulburn High School. The property remains in the family, run since the mid-1950s by John's brother Mick.

== Military career ==
Studdert graduated from Royal Military College, Duntroon in December 1943, and was commissioned as a lieutenant in the Royal Australian Artillery (RAA). During the Second World War he served with the 2/6th Field Regiment in the Netherlands East Indies (Halmahera and Borneo), with the occupation forces in Japan, and with the Headquarters of the 34th Infantry Brigade. After the war he was posted as an instructor at the Artillery School, North Head, and subsequently as Adjutant of the 6th Field Regiment in Tasmania. After attending the Canadian Staff College at Kingston, Ontario, he was appointed as the Instructor Artillery at the Royal Military College and subsequently attended the Royal Military College of Science, Shrivenham in England.

In April 1960, Studdert became the first Commanding Officer of the re-raised 4th Field Regiment, tasked with preparing the unit for service in Vietnam. Before their deployment, he was posted as the Technical Staff Officer Grade 1 at the Australian High Commission in London. This was followed by a number of materiel related postings.

In 1969 Studdert was posted as the Commandant of the Officer Training Unit, Scheyville, until May 1972. For his service as commandant, he was appointed an Officer of the Order of the British Empire.

Studdert moved to Canberra in 1972, serving in the Materiel Division and retiring in December 1978 as the Deputy Chief of Materiel. For his work in Materiel Division he was made an Officer of the Order of Australia.

== Retirement ==
In the 24 years following his retirement, Studdert returned to the region where he grew up and worked a property, Bunratty, just south of Goulburn. He spent most of those years as the Secretary of the local Gundarry Bush Fire Brigade, where he wrote a 5-year equipment replacement and upgrade plan, established an effective command, control and communications system for the Brigade and planned and implemented regular and meaningful training for the fire fighters.

Studdert had a series of heart attacks from October 2002 and died in Canberra Hospital on 18 February 2003. He was buried at the Goulburn cemetery; the funeral service at St Nicholas' church was well attended and the Rural Fire Service provided the pallbearers.

== Family ==
Jack Studdert was survived by:

- his wife of 52 years, Mavis,
- his sons David and
- Martin [Colonel Martin Charles Studdert AM; a.k.a. Marty Studdert],
- his daughter Fiona,
- their partners Valerie, Helena and Nick and
- two grandchildren Nicholas and Hannah.

Other relations:

- Father: Charles Handcock Studdert
- Mother: Bertha Geraldine Cripps-Clark
- Sister: Vivien
- Brother: Charles Herbert "Mick" Studdert
