= Officer Cadet School, Portsea =

Australian Army training establishment

Coordinates: 38°18′47″S 144°41′37″E

- The OCS Portsea Badge
- Motto: Loyalty and Service
- Type: former Military college
- Established: 1951–1985
- Location: Portsea, Victoria, Australia
- Website: OCS Alumni website

The Officer Cadet School, Portsea (sometimes referred to as OCS Portsea) was an officer training establishment of the Australian Army. Established at Portsea in Victoria, Australia, in 1951 to provide training to officer cadets prior to commissioning, the OCS provided the Australian Regular Army with the bulk of its junior officers for many years. However, following a review of military training establishments in Australia in the mid-1980s, the school was eventually closed in 1985, as the Royal Military College, Duntroon, assumed sole responsibility for training Army officers.

The motto of OCS Portsea was Loyalty and Service, which was chosen by Colonel (later Major General Sir) James Harrison during his time serving as OCS's first Commandant (1952–1954).

== Location ==
OCS Portsea was located at Point Nepean near the mouth of Port Phillip Bay in Victoria, Australia. The land occupied by OCS was originally used as a quarantine station for many years, where newly arrived immigrants were housed before they could be screened for infectious diseases. When the quarantine station closed, the OCS took up the remainder of the land, although upon closure the land was re-allocated to the Army School of Health. In the late 1990s and early 2000s, the Defence presence on the land ended when the Army School of Health moved to Latchford Barracks, in Bonegilla, Victoria. In June 2009, the land was transferred to the Victorian government and has been incorporated into the Point Nepean National Park. In December 2009, the site was opened to the community as a public park and the Portsea location is now heritage listed, forming part of the greater Point Nepean National Park. Many of the old buildings were retained and some still stand today, having been protected under law. One of the buildings, which was used as a hospital, remains as a museum. OCS Cadets conducted lessons in a building previously used as a mortuary during the operation of the quarantine station. The Regimental Sergeant Major's hut is believed to be one of the oldest buildings in Victoria.

== History ==
The Officer Cadet School, Portsea began training officers for the Australian Army in January 1952. During its 33 years of operation, 3,544 cadets graduated, consisting of 2,826 Australian Regular Army, 30 RAAF and 688 foreign students from the School, until it closed in 1985. Between 1952 and 1985, OCS Portsea trained 40 percent of the new officers commissioned into the Regular Army, compared with Duntroon's 28 percent. The remaining officers were provided by the Officer Training Wing of the Women's Royal Australian Army Corps School at George's Heights, Sydney, and the Officer Training Unit, Scheyville.

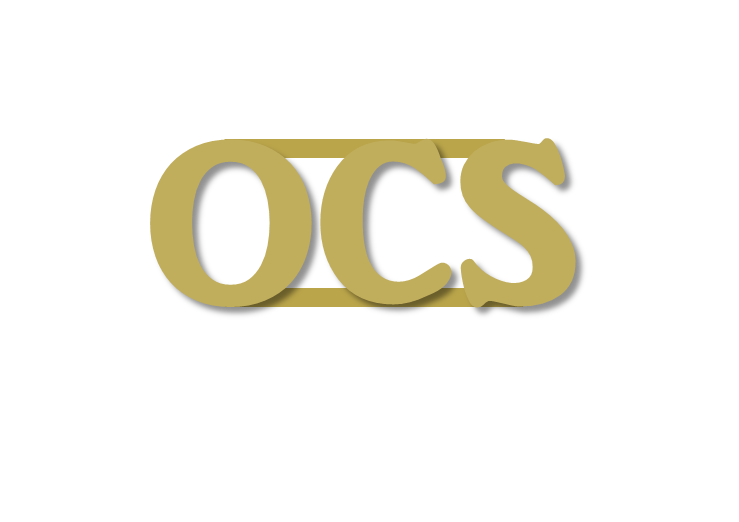
Officer Cadet School Portsea brass shoulder title

The school was set up amidst the backdrop of the post-war period, when commitments to Korea and Japan and to the national service scheme required an increase in the number of junior officers in the Army. The four-year course at the Royal Military College, Duntroon was not flexible enough to enable this increase in junior officers, so the decision was made to establish the Officer Cadet School at Portsea. Unlike Duntroon, OCS did not provide a degree course, instead it trained prospective junior officers over a shorter course; initially lasting for six months and later extended to around one year- approximately 44 weeks.

Entry criteria differed to Duntroon, with broader age ranges and lower educational requirements; consequently a high proportion of Portsea's officer cadets were serving soldiers deemed suitable for commissioning. A significant number of OCS cadets were direct entry civilians. Additionally, OCS trained servicemen from other nations including the Philippines, South Vietnam, Cambodia, Brunei, Malaysia, Singapore, Papua New Guinea, Kenya, Uganda, Fiji and New Zealand and those graduated were commissioned into their respective services. A number of graduates were also RAAF personnel.

Following the Vietnam War, the national service scheme ended and the OTU Scheyville was closed in 1973. In the mid-1970s, a review of military training establishments in Australia occurred. As a result, a decision created a tri-service military academy offering tertiary education to officer trainees of all three services (Army, Air Force and Navy). This academy became known as the Australian Defence Force Academy (ADFA). Due to the formation of ADFA, the Royal Military College, Duntroon stopped providing degrees to its graduates and reduced its course from four years to eighteen months. This essentially meant that Duntroon and OCS would be providing the same training and the decision was made to close Portsea in 1985, as RMC Duntroon would commence the eighteen-month course in 1986.

The final OCS graduating class was the class of December 1985, which included female cadets for the first time following the closure of the Women's Officer Training Wing at Georges Heights (Sydney) in December 1984. RMC Duntroon then became the sole officer commissioning establishment for General Service Officers in the Australian Regular Army. In December 1986, the final Portsea intake, who had been transferred to Duntroon, graduated.

== The Colours ==
OCS Portsea's colours were presented on 1 June 1968, by Prince Philip at the South Melbourne Cricket Ground. They consisted of a Queen's Colour with the "OCS motif in the centre" and a Regimental Colour that was an "infantry green flag with the regimental badge, title and motto surrounded by wattle sprigs". With the closure of OCS Portsea in December 1985, the school's Colours were laid up. On 23 March 1986, the Colours were paraded for the last time and were then laid up in the Anzac Memorial Chapel of St Paul at the Royal Military College, Duntroon, in the Australian Capital Territory.

== The Portsea Memorial Wall ==
A Memorial Wall dedicated to OCS graduates who lost their lives on active service was established, overlooking the parade ground, at the OCS location at Portsea and dedicated in 1967. The names of these members also appear on tablets overlooking the parade ground at the Royal Military College, Duntroon. After Portsea's closure, the memorial wall was carefully dismantled and re-erected within the grounds of the Royal Military College, Duntroon. Originally this was located outside the Commandant's house, but in 2004 it was moved to Stakey Park on Lavarack Road. The Point Nepean National Park staff have respected the tradition and are considering a request that a lasting memorial be re-established in the location of the old memorial wall.

== Notable graduates ==
Portsea had a number of graduates who were either notable officers or colourful and successful in civilian life. Portsea's most famous graduate was Major Peter Badcoe, VC. Badcoe graduated from Portsea in the class of December 1952, and was awarded the Victoria Cross for gallantry while serving as a member of the Australian Army Training Team Vietnam in 1967. He received the award posthumously and was one of four members of the AATV to receive the Victoria Cross during the Vietnam War. Major Badcoe VC is buried in Malaysia. The main hall at Portsea was named in his honour. A large lecture theatre in the main instructional building at RMC Duntroon is also named in his honour.

Other notable graduates include Lieutenant David Brian, the first graduate to be killed in action (Thai-Malay border in 1964) and buried in Malaysia but re-buried in Australia in 2016, the late Group Captain Robert Halverson and formerly Speaker of the House of Representatives, Lieutenant General Frank Hickling formerly Chief of Army (1998), Lieutenant General Ken Gillespie formerly Chief of Army (2008), Lieutenant General David Morrison formerly Chief of Army (2011) and Australian of the Year in 2016, Lieutenant General Sir Jerry Mateparae, formerly Chief of the New Zealand Defence Force and later Governor-General of New Zealand, class of December 1976. Les Hiddins, star of the television show, The Bush Tucker Man, class of June 1970.

Lieutenant Colonel Buka Suka Dimka, class of 1963, was one of the leaders of the abortive 1976 coup which led to the assassination of the Nigerian military Head of State General Murtala Mohammed. Lieutenant Boniface Ikejiofor was also a Nigerian graduate of Portsea in 1963.
