= Box Hill Inn =

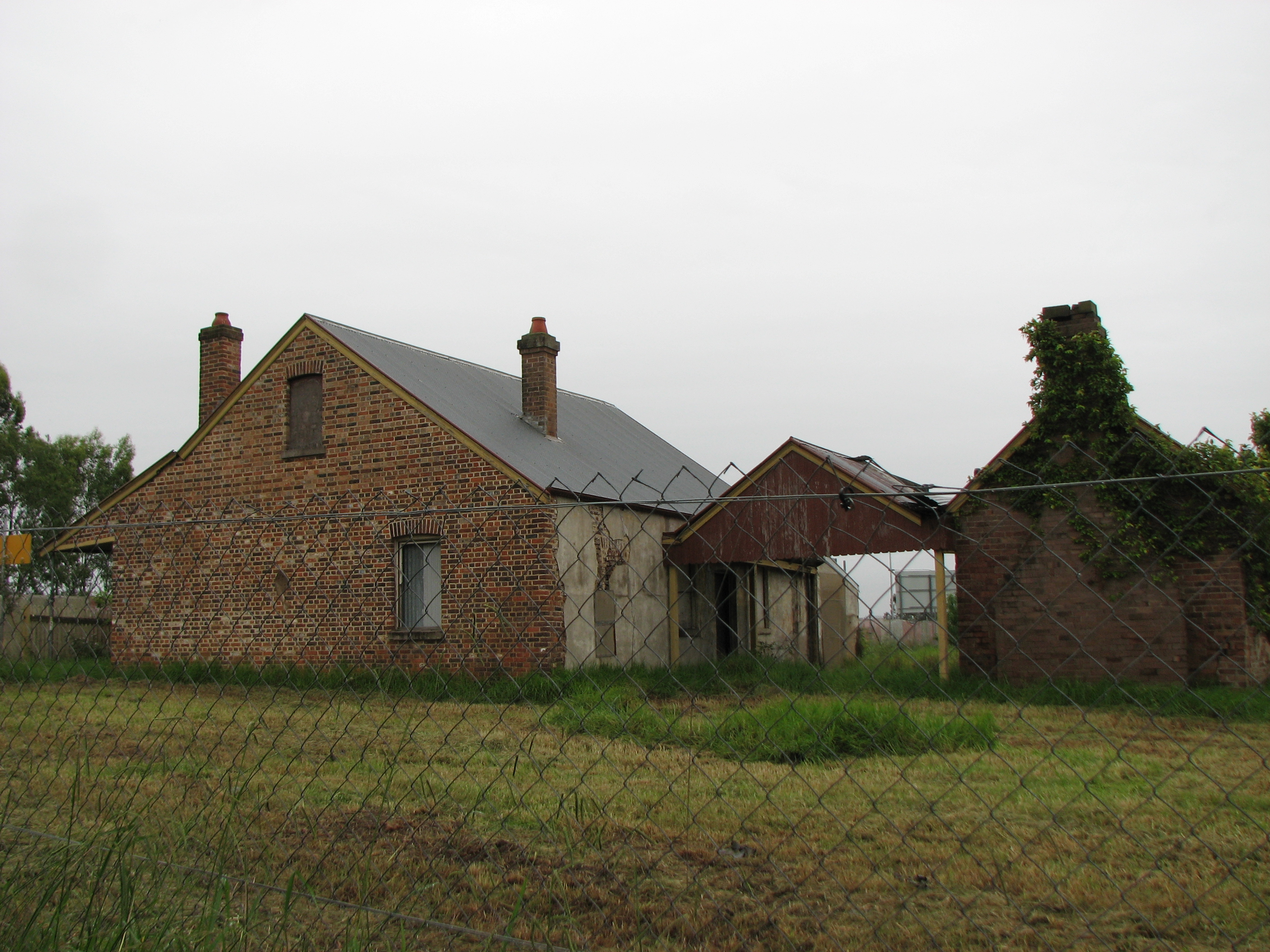
- Box Hill Inn, 753 Windsor Road, Box Hill, New South Wales in 2020

- Location within Sydney Location within Australia
- 33°39′35″S 150°53′09″E
- Location: Windsor Road, Box Hill, New South Wales, Australia

History
- Built: c. 1825

Site notes
- Architectural style: Old Colonial Georgian

New South Wales Heritage Register
- Official name: Box Hill Inn; Mogul Stud; Rummery Homestead; Coach House Inn; Bee Hive Inn
- Type: State heritage (built)
- Designated: 2 April 1999
- Reference no.: 724
- Type: Inn/Tavern
- Category: Commercial

The Box Hill Inn is a heritage-listed inn located at 753 Windsor Road, Box Hill, New South Wales, Australia. It is also known as Mogul Stud, Rummery Homestead, Coach House Inn and Bee Hive Inn. The property is privately owned and was added to the New South Wales State Heritage Register on 2 April 1999.

== History ==
Two-storey brick inn with a two-roomed attic reached by a narrow Old Colonial Georgian stairway in the rear room. It is said to have been built in 1825 by the Rummery family who were orchardists in Riverstone as the Coach House Inn.

It was first licensed as the Box Hill Inn in 1842, and later changed to the Bee Hive Inn in 1848. Licenses were held by pioneers such as Joseph Suffolk, John Foley, Robert Smith and John Barnett.

Has remained vacant for many years.

== Description ==
Two storey brick inn with a two roomed attic reached by a narrow Georgian stairway in the rear room. It is said to have been built in 1825. The front veranda has octagonal timber posts with beaded-edge wide timber ceiling linings. There are two front doors, one of six panels with a four-pane fanlight over and the other of eight panels and no fanlight. Windows are 12-paned with solid timber shutters. The front wall is stuccoed and tuck pointed to represent Flemish bond brickwork.

Internally there are six panel and vertically boarded doors. Architraves have been removed, but one mantelpiece remains on site. Walls and ceilings are of plaster. The ceilings are a lime and mud mortar pressed into laths. There is a cellar under one room at the end and a separate brick kitchen wing that appear to have been built in the late Victorian or Federation periods. A timber-framed gabled roof with detailing typical of the early twentieth century links the two brick structures The gable roof is clad with corrugated steel. The end wall has been demolished and a new footing poured. The rebuilding of this wall was stopped by Baulkham Hills Shire Council who required a development application and concurrence of the NSW Heritage Council.

Neat little early cottage, from c. 1830, with the roof line sweeping down to a low profile over the front veranda. Several fruit trees remain - quince, citrus. A timber-framed shed stands to the rear in poor condition. Three wells lie to the rear and north of the house, two of them are unusually wide.

Much of the Georgian character still remains with the Coach House at the rear.

=== Condition ===
As at 4 May 2007, the general condition was fair.

=== Modifications and dates ===
Unsympathetic alterations carried out some years ago, but would be easy to restore the facade (c. 1989).

The eastern end wall has been demolished and a new reinforced concrete footing poured. The rebuilding of this wall was stopped by Baulkham Hills Shire Council, who required a development application and concurrence of the NSW Heritage Council. Owners propose restoration, with reconstruction of eastern wall on new footings, as it was in danger of imminent collapse. Original bricks and a reproduction of the original windows are to be used. As a second stage, the owners propose to renovate the roof, as it is in very poor condition.

== Heritage listing ==
As at 4 May 2007, the former Box Hill Inn or the Rummery Homestead is considered to be an item of the state's environmental heritage because of its:

- Historical value – it was built in 1825 and as such is a rarity in New South Wales. It is one of the earliest roadside inns and one of the few still remaining on the route between Parramatta and Windsor;
- Cultural significance – the inn is a reminder of how distance played a significant role in the settlement of the state; and
- Architectural significance – the inn is an example of a vernacular building whose use changed as demand required.

Box Hill Inn was listed on the New South Wales State Heritage Register on 2 April 1999.

== See also ==
- Australian non-residential architectural styles
- Media related to Box Hill Inn at Wikimedia Commons
