= Scheyville National Park =

National park in New South Wales, Australia

- IUCN category V (protected landscape/seascape)
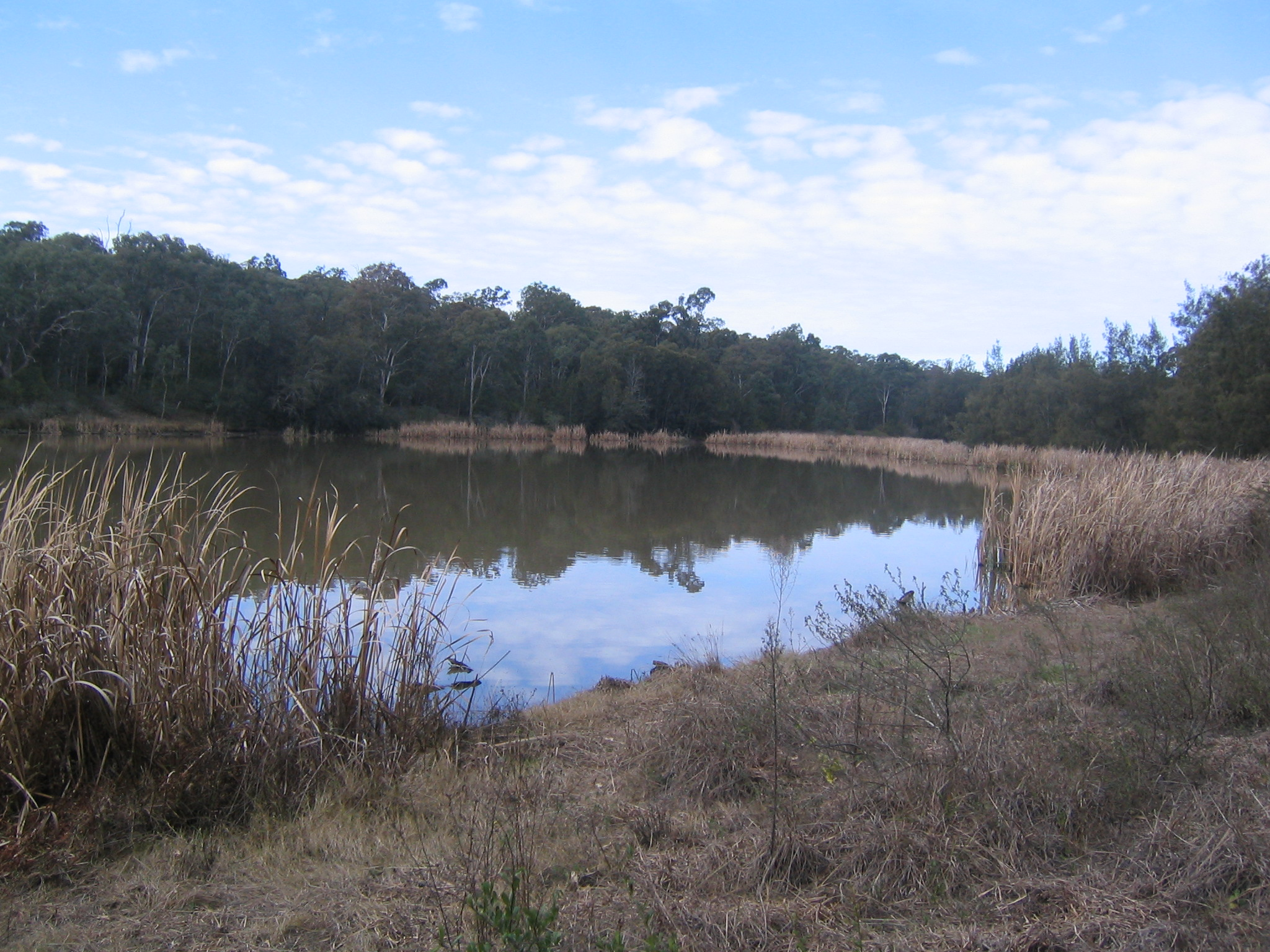
- North Swamp in Longneck Lagoon

- Location within New South Wales
- Location: New South Wales
- Nearest city: Windsor
- Coordinates: 33°36′24″S 150°53′20″E
- Area: 9.2 km^{2} (3.6 sq mi)
- Established: 4 April 1996
- Governing body: NSW National Parks & Wildlife Service
- Website: Official website

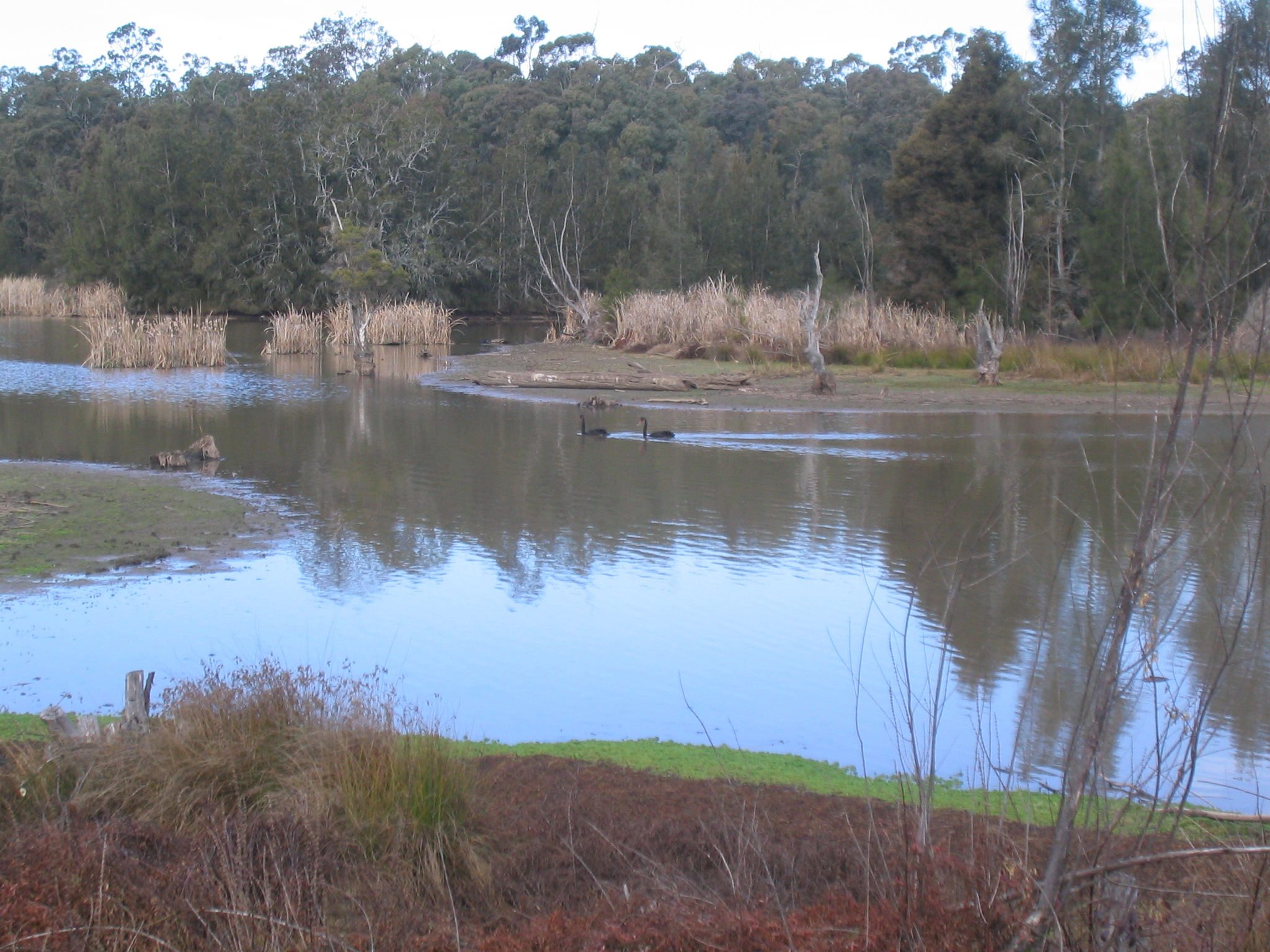
Longneck Lagoon viewed from Cattai Road

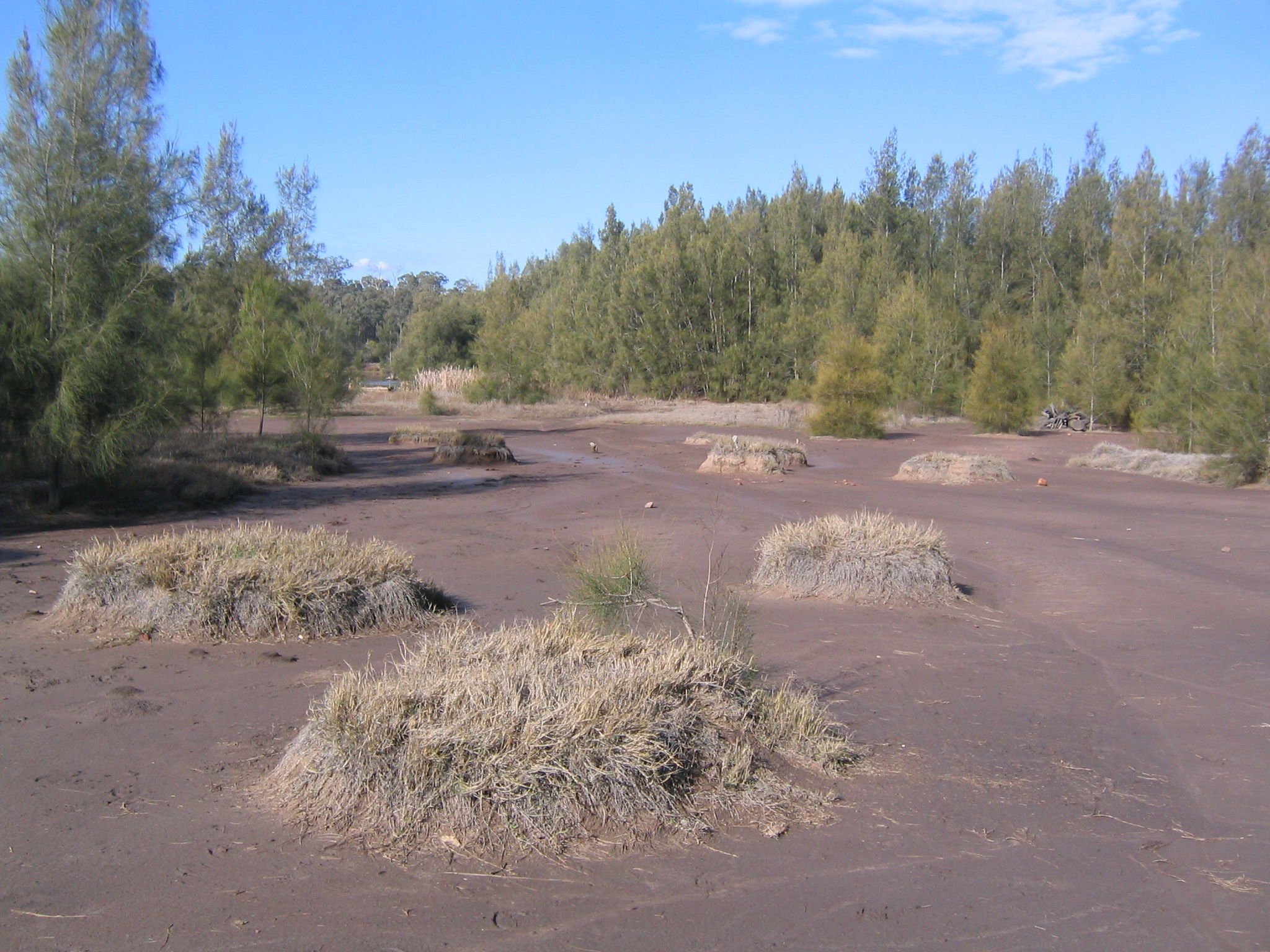
A mudflat in Longneck Lagoon

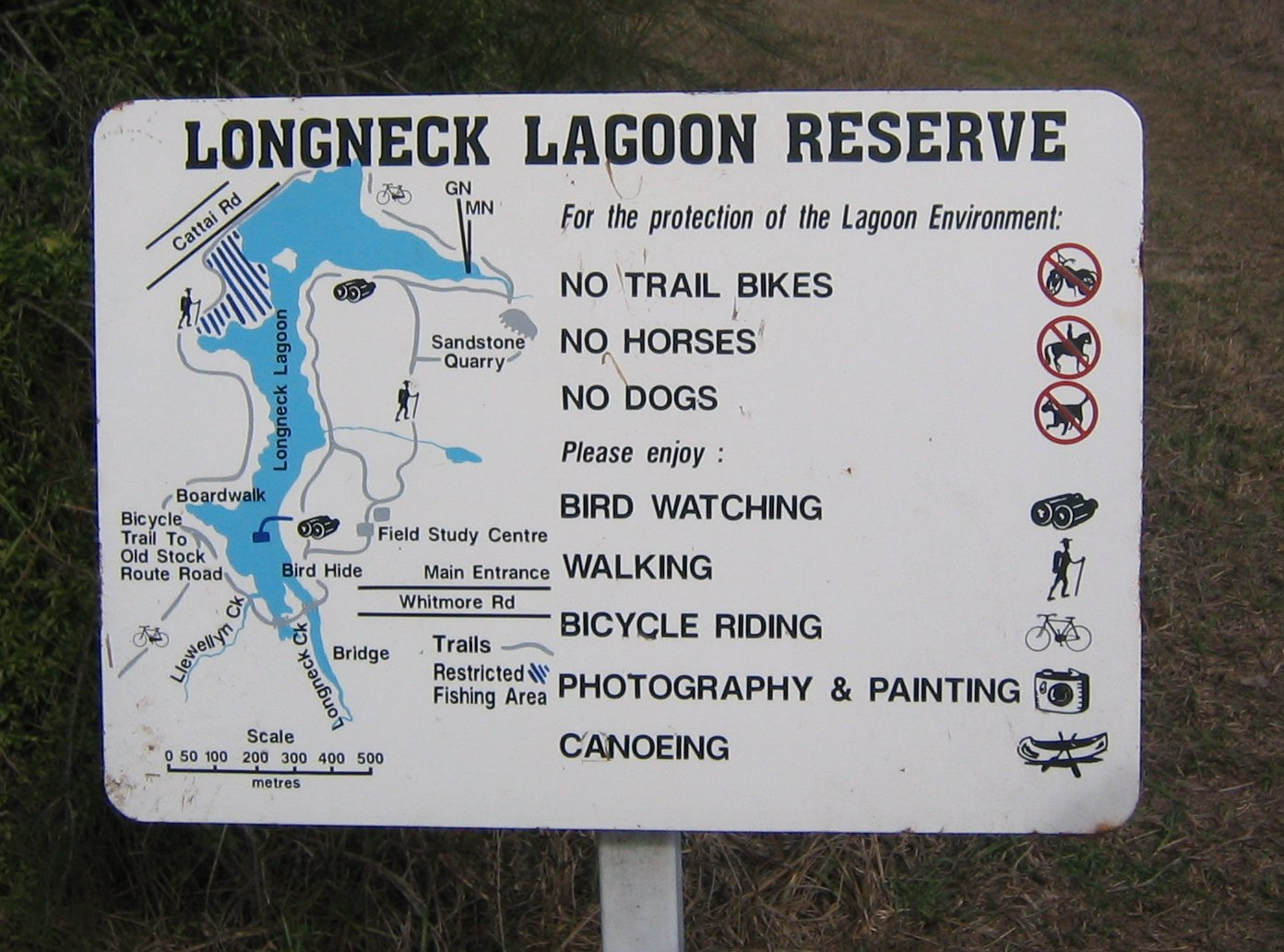
A sign on the track around Longneck Lagoon

The Scheyville National Park ( /ˌskaɪˈvɪl/) is a protected national park in the northwestern suburbs of Sydney in New South Wales, in eastern Australia. The 920-hectare (2,300-acre) national park is situated approximately 40 kilometres (25 mi) northwest of the Sydney central business district, northeast of Windsor, near the settlement of Scheyville. Longneck Lagoon lies in the northern section of the park. It was added to the New South Wales State Heritage Register on 9 April 2010.

== Overview ==
The cultural sites of Scheyville reflect many major themes in Australia's development since European settlement. Beginning in 1804, the area was set aside as a public common for the people of the district. The Pitt Town Cooperative Labour Settlement was established in 1893, followed by a Casual Labour Farm where unemployed men could live while finding other work.

William Frances Schey, MP for Redfern and Darlington, helped this tradition of experimental farming continue in the form of the Government Agricultural Training Farm. The training scheme was a program to promote and assist the migration of British Youths willing to become farm workers.

After the outbreak of World War II the training farm was taken over the Commonwealth with the 73rd Australian Anti Aircraft Search Light Company and the RAAF 244 1ST Parachute Battalion being stationed there. During the post-war immigration wave of the 1950s the lands and buildings at Scheyville became the starting point for thousands of immigrants seeking a new life in Australia.

From 1965 to 1973 Scheyville became the home of the Officer Training Unit. An intense six-month course designed to turn out officers capable of leading a platoon in Vietnam was offered to National Servicemen. After years of neglect and many development proposals for the land, Scheyville was finally gazetted as a national park in early 1996.

== History ==
=== Aboriginal occupation ===
The land now known as Scheyville National Park and Pitt Town Nature Reserve was originally Dharug land. The Cattai clan of the Dharug people inhabited the area around Cattai Creek and Pitt Town at least 30,000-years ago. The area along the Hawkesbury Rivers and its tributaries provided fertile alluvial soils sustaining consistent supplies of food for the local Aboriginal people from the fish and wildlife stock and edible vegetation.

On two occasions, one in 1789 and the other 1791, the earliest contact with the Dharug of the Hawkesbury area was made by Governor Phillip and his party. By 1794 the first European settlers had established themselves in the area, carving out farms on the same rich soils that had sustained the Aboriginal population for thousands of years. First interactions between the Dharug and European settlers were cordial, but soon deteriorated as land was cleared for farming, trees were cut down for fuel and firewood, and the Dharug were denied access to their traditional hunting, fishing and gathering areas along the Hawkesbury River and other watercourses by European settlers.

As settlement in the area continued and spread further inland along the river, the local Aboriginal population began to diminish. This was due to a number of reasons most significantly, mortality from introduced diseases and migration of the Dharug out of the area because of the disruption to traditional lifestyle and competition for natural resources. This pattern continued and by 1851 it was reported that there were no Aboriginal people living in the Pitt Town area.

=== Pitt Town village settlement ===
In 1804 an area of approximately 5,650 acres (22.9 km^{2}) was set aside as a grazing common for the local settlers. This area originally called the Nelson Common finally became known as the Pitt Town Common. By 1889 the Common had increased to 9,000 acres (36 km^{2}) in size, and extended from Maraylya to South Windsor.

In 1893 the government resumed 3,000 acres (12 km^{2}) of the Pitt Town Common in order to establish an experimental agricultural settlement. It was declared the Pitt Town Village Settlement, operating as a cooperative farm, established to allow the unemployed and their families to make a living during the economic depression of the 1890s. Each family was expected to work the common land, clear and tend their own small allotment and contribute to the construction of community facilities in exchange for a set ration of food. By 1896 the settlement had failed due to the difficulties of farming the country.

=== Labour farms and the Dreadnought scheme ===
Despite the paucity of the soils for agriculture, the government persisted with endeavours to assist the needy by putting them to work on the farm at Pitt Town and in 1896 a Casual Labour Farm was established on the site of the Cooperative Farm. Here the poor and unemployed worked collecting firewood or tending pigs, for a small wage, for a limited term of three or four months. In 1905, dairy cattle were added to the farm's livestock. A scheme was introduced to train young men in the skills of raising livestock and farming. The Pitt Town Village Settlement and later Casual Labour Farm. tell a resonant and significant story in the history of NSW as they were radical and often controversial government responses to social problems experienced by families and individuals in the economic depression of the 1890s. As such, they were a significant early example of government intervention in the welfare of its constituents.

The Farm Training for Australian Boys scheme ran until 1910 when under the vision and management of William Schey, Director of Labour and Industry in the first years of Federation, the farm was established as a training farm for young British Migrants who arrived in Australia under the Dreadnought scheme. The scheme was a State government incentive and offered the boys 13 months of training in all aspects of farming, dairying, livestock care, care and use of farm equipment orcharding and cropping. After the training, the boys were placed with a NSW farmer. Many of the existing facilities were retained to accommodate the boys and facilitate the training and farming activities although Schey oversaw the construction of a number of new buildings. his was the first of several youth migration schemes in Australia established with the sole focus of bringing youth to Australia for training in areas of skills shortage such as agriculture and domestic work. Later schemes included the Fairbridge Farm scheme, the Barwell Boys scheme and the Big Brother scheme.

The Dreadnought scheme at Scheyville ran from 1911 to 1915 when the outbreak of World War I saw a reduction in number of trainees at the farm from 800 in 1913 to 30 in 1915.

By this time the agriculture sector, like other sectors of the workforce in NSW was experiencing a serve lack of skilled workers due to the enlistment of many men in the armed forces and their engagement in active service in the European theatre of war. The government decided to call on the women of Australia to fill the skills shortage. To address these problems in the agricultural sector the facilities and training course at Scheyville were opened to the women of NSW in 1915. While there was a significant increase in women entering the workforce between 1914 and 1918 (from 24% to 34%) these were mainly into areas women traditionally worked in, clothing, footwear, food industries with some increases in clerical, retail and teaching. This resistance to stretching gender roles and taking on work outside the traditional areas was reflected in the noticeable lack of interest among NSW women in taking up the offer of training in agricultural skills at Scheyville. Between 1915 and 1917 when the incentive was abandoned, about 25 women had trained at Scheyville.

At the close of the war when the thousands of soldiers returned home many found that there were no longer jobs for them. In recognition of their service to the nation and to give them a helping hand the Commonwealth and State governments joined forces to put in place a soldier settlement scheme whereby, on application, returning soldiers were allocated by or leased land from the State Government and financially assisted to establish farms by the Commonwealth government. Many of the returnees had no previous farming experience and so during 1917 and 1918, the Government Agricultural Training Farm at Scheyville was opened to returned soldiers who received basic agricultural training there.

In 1919, the Dreadnought training scheme restarted and it continued to run up until 1929. The last five years of the scheme were funded jointly by the Commonwealth and State governments and also the British government.

In 1928 plans were drawn up by the Government Architect's Office for a handsome set of buildings in the Georgian Revival and Inter-War Mediterranean style. These building formed the "Quadrangle Precinct" and comprised an administrative block, kitchen dining room and two dormitories.

While the Scheme was officially suspended in 1929 due to the looming economic crisis of the Great Depression, the farm continued to train both Australian and Immigrant boys through the 1930s when it was known as the Government Training Farm. During the 1930s many changes were made to the farm facilities including the construction of a double silo, and a new dairy and tank base.

=== World War II ===
With the outbreak of World War II, the farm was commandeered by the military. Initially, it was intended to use the farm for artillery and anti-tank warfare training but little record of this is available. In early 1942 the Scheyville Dreadnought Farm became the home of the newly formed 73rd Anti-Aircraft Searchlight Company.

The new and highly specialised force was an essential element in the defence of Australia, particularly after the Japanese surprise air Attack on Pearl Harbor on 7 December 1941. The 73rd Company used the land at Scheyville to carry out basic training while waiting for its ranks to fill.

73rd Company administration was carried out in the former farm administration building of the Quadrangle Precinct. Officers were housed in the Quadrangle dormitories suitably adapted as single person rooms. The dining room became the officer's mess. Other ranks were housed in tents pitched to the southeast of the quadrangle buildings. The company moved out of Scheyville in November 1942. They first moved to a Staging Camp in Brisbane and then to Townsville where on 29 December 1942 they boarded the MV Duntroon and were shipped to New Guinea where they served at Port Moresby, Nadzab and Lae during 1943 and 1944. Initially illuminating anti-aircraft artillery they soon were also employed illuminating enemy aircraft. Their most commended function by both the Australian and American forces was their work guiding Allied aircraft, damaged in battle, back to their bases in Port Moresby and Lae. Often these aircraft had lost radar and radio contact and the lives of those airmen depended on the assistance provided by the 73rd Company men.

At the outset of the war the allied nations had no effective paratrooper forces. They were quickly convinced of the necessity to train paratroopers as Germany successfully deployed paratroopers in battles to annex Austria, Norway, the Netherlands and Crete. As part of Australia's contribution to the defence of the British Empire and our own shores then under threat by the Japanese, the 1st Parachute Battalion was formed in late 1942 and was the first airborne combat battalion to exist in the Australian armed forces. The members of the battalion were recruited from the ranks of the army and most of the men had already seen active service in other theatres of war. A number of those who joined the battalion were decorated and there were ten soldiers who had earned the Military Cross for their war service.

Extensive training was required for those volunteering to join the new force. They began training with Australia's first Parachute Training Unit at RAAF Station Tocumwal under the command of Wing Commander P. Glasscock (RAAF). Training at Tocumwal was in specific aspects of airborne combat and culminated in their first parachute jump. The paratroopers continued training for a short period of time at RAAF Base Richmond. During flight training members of the battalion had to qualify for the winged insignia and the "Red Beret" by performing a total of seven jumps. Once flight training was completed the men were then marshalled at Scheyville where, while waiting for their battalion ranks to fill, they received general combat and fitness training.

Like the Searchlight Company before them, the Parachute Battalion took over the facilities at the "Scheyville Camp", utilising the quadrangle buildings for administration, officer accommodation and the slopes to the south-east of the quadrangle.

Under the command of Lt. Col. Sir John Overall CBE, MC & Bar, a seasoned and distinguished officer, the company moved out of Scheyville in late 1944 eventually arriving at Canungra where they received training in jungle combat. The battalion finally moved to Mareeba Airfield in northern Queensland to await orders. This was where the battalion spent the final months of the war.

=== Scheyville Migrant Holding Centre ===
In the immediate post-war years there was a huge influx of migrants from Europe, people traumatised and left homeless and with few resources for survival. By 1950 Australia had received 153,685 assisted migrants who were initially housed in government run migrant accommodation. In 1949 as the need for migrant accommodation continued to grow, it was decided that the facility at Scheyville would be established as a Migrant Holding Centre. Between 1950 and 1964 thousands of migrants had passed through Scheyville Migrant Holding Centre which was largest of the migrant centres in Australia during those years.

The Quadrangle buildings were adapted to accommodate the centre's staff and administration and prefabricated huts were located on site to house the migrants. Two large SAARS huts were installed on site, one of which contained kitchen facilities to augment those in the quadrangle building. The other huts and some new buildings housed many other health and amenity facilities including a community hall. A large number of prefabricated huts were installed on site to accommodate the migrants. A sewage treatment works was constructed on site in 1949. The installation of a sewage plant and electrical network during the post-WWII phases of use allowed the migrant camp and the later Officer Training Unit to operate as an almost self sufficient community. The Scheyville Migrant Holding Centre accommodated new migrants up until 1964.

=== Officer Training Unit, Scheyville ===
In 1965 Scheyville was once again commandeered for military uses, specifically to house an Officer Training Unit for National Servicemen. The OTU provided and intensive 22-week program of training in military leadership skills for select National Servicemen. The Unit was the first of its kind in Australia as previously officers were traditionally educated and trained in the elite military schools such as Royal Military College, Duntroon and not selected from those drafted into National Service.

Between 1965 and 1973, and under the command of the noted soldier and military educationist Ian Geddes, 1871 conscripts passed through Scheyville OTU making use of the classroom-based training as well as the extensive field exercises and physical fitness training.

Once again the quadrangle buildings formed the nexus of the site's activities. The administration block on the southern end of the quadrangle housed the commanding officer's and Sergeant Major's administrative quarters The dormitory buildings on the east and west sides were further adapted to house the officers who provided the training, and the dining room and kitchen was the Officer's Mess.

The commandant and his family were housed in the old farm managers house and the sergeant major and family in the overseers cottage. The prefabricated buildings, a legacy of the Migrant Holding Centre period accommodated the Officer Cadets. The SAARs huts were converted to provide gymnasium facilities and the officer cadets' dining and recreation facility. A parade ground was established to the north east of the quadrangle and adjacent to that on the west of the parade ground, a "t" shaped teaching facility was constructed.

In addition to reusing existing buildings, the OTU made extensive use of the surrounding farmlands and scrub, establishing obstacle courses, a small arms range, challenge courses and a tough rout march trail.

The officer training was tough physically, emotionally and mentally. It was intended to remake, remould and train the potential Officer "in a way that was similar to tearing the insides out of an old factory and completely renovating the insides".

330 graduates of the Scheyville Officer Training Unit served in the Vietnam War, eight of whom died in action. Other graduates did not see active service in Vietnam but went on to other areas of the Army where 130 became lieutenant colonels and 13 brigadiers. Many who trained at the OTU, such as Tim Fischer and Jeff Kennet have achieved positions of importance in civilian life and attribute their success to their training at Scheyville.

Direct entry aviation cadets were also trained at Scheyville, in the same 6-month courses as the National Servicemen. There were three 12-month Officer Cadet School (OCS) Portsea courses at Scheyville in 1972 and 1973. The first six months of these courses were the same as that for National Servicemen and the latter six months concentrating on subjects more suited to careers with the Regular Army. The Officer Training Unit continued to function until 1973 (the last intake was October 1972 to March 1973), after the Australian Labor Party abolished further National Service in December 1972. However, a small number of the Regular Army officer cadets were still training there until December 1973 before travelling to OCS Portsea to graduate.

=== Hawkesbury Agricultural College campus ===
In 1973 the OTU left Scheyville and it was left vacant for some years. In 1977 the facility was rented from the Commonwealth by Hawkesbury College of Advanced Education which was in need of residential facilities for its students. The Scheyville residential campus began operating in 1978 and closed down in 1983.

=== Post-1980 ===
In 1985 the NSW Police Tactical Response Group used the site at Scheyville to train and practise tactical response skills. Since this time there have been plans to develop the site as an international airport, a maximum security prison and a large housing development. These plans did not reach fruition and in 1996 the land was put under the care of the National Parks and Wildlife Service when the Scheyville National Park was gazetted.

Early management practices of the National Parks and Wildlife Service reflected the organisation's primary concern at the time, the conservation of natural values of items under its care. Because of this NPWS allowed the demolition of a number of structures damaged by the police and military uses of the property. Since that time there has been a growing awareness of the importance of conserving all the values, including cultural heritage and natural heritage values in National Parks and the Department of Environment and Climate Change has taken up this challenge.

The Phoenix Pistol Club has been running from 1992 in Scheyville National Park, near the corner of Dormitory Hill Road and Scheyville Rd, Scheyville NSW. The club is using part of the original rifle range built by the Australian Government during World War 1 as a part of the officer training camp originally located in the quarry.

== Surviving aspects of historical significance ==
Scheyville National Park is located in the Hawkesbury region on the edge of the Cumberland Plain near the Hawkesbury River and Pitt Town Bottoms. The park comprises an area of 954 hectares and is bound by Midson Road and Scheyville Road to the east, Old Pitt Town Road and Old Stock Route Road to the West, Pitt Town Dural Road to the north and residential properties facing Saunders road to the south and boundaries with properties along Avondale, Whitmore, Greenfiled, Phipps and Old Stock Route Roads in the lower Longneck Catchment.

The park contains the largest remnant of Cumberland Plain Grey Box/Ironbark Woodland in the region. To the north west of the site on a ridge between Pitt Town and Avondale roads is a small area of Castlereagh Scribbly Gum Woodland which is considered as vulnerable. Between Llewellyn Creek, Longneck Lagoon and Avondale road there is Shale /Gravel Transition Forest vegetation containing 2 vulnerable species, Dilwynia tenuifolia and Acacia pubescens. The park also contains Longneck Lagoon, part of the Hawkesbury wetlands which is home a wide variety of birdlife and a number of threatened and endangered species. Much of the Scheyville National Park has been cleared since European settlement and supports species of introduced grasses such as paspalum, Kikuyu, Couch and African Love grass and regenerating Cumberland Plan Woodland.

While much of the fabric demonstrating the history and development of the site is archaeological, ruins or in poor condition, there is a range of evidence that clearly demonstrates the way the place used and functioned through all its phases of development

Within the larger curtilage of the Park there are 4 main areas each of which contains remnant evidence of structures, buildings and evidence of land use from all stages of the history of the Scheyville National Park. The four areas are the Longneck Lagoon area, the Scheyville Camp area, the Dreadnought Farm area and the Sewage works/Military training area.

=== Area 1: Long Neck Lagoon ===
The Longneck Lagoon area is located in the north west corner of the park and surrounds Long Neck Lagoon. Aside from its important natural values as a wetlands and vegetation reserve containing endangered and vulnerable species, the area contains earliest evidence of one colonial use associated with the park when it was still the Pitt Town Common. The large sandstone quarry located between the end of Phipps Road, Cattai Road and the Longneck Lagoon Field Studies Centre commenced operation in the mid 19th Century and continued well into the 20th Century after the Common was decommissioned. Stone from the quarry was used in local buildings such as St James Anglican Church and Bona Vista Homestead at Pitt Town.

The sandstone quarry is a substantial feature of this area and demonstrates quarrying techniques dating from the mid 19th Century to the 1930s.

=== Area 2: The Scheyville Camp area ===
The area lying between Midson Road, Old Pitt Town Road, Scheyville Road and Dormitory Hill Road. This area was the site of the Pitt Town Village Settlement and was later used by the Scheyville Government Training Farm, WWII military uses, post-WWII Migrant Holding Centre and the Vietnam War era Officers Training Unit. It contains the majority of structures and archaeological remains at Scheyville. The earliest remnant farm structures are generally located in a basin near Longneck Creek to the south east of the quadrangle buildings.

Remnants and archaeological sites in this area include;

- Allotments site and former roadway relating to the Pitt Town

Settlement Village period 1893–1896;

- Site of the old dairy and silo relating to the Pitt Town Settlement Village period, and the early Dreadnought farm period 1911–1929;
- Underground concrete tank relating to the last phase of the Scheyville Government Agricultural Training farm 1930–1939;
- Single silo, relating to the early Scheyville Government Agricultural Training farm period;
- Old dairy, Scheyville relating to the Pitt Town Settlement Village and Government Agricultural Training farm periods;
- Ruins of barn and sheep dipping area, relating to the early Scheyville Government Agricultural Training farm period;
- Supervisor's cottage and post office, Scheyville Government Agricultural Training farm period;
- Group of archaeological sites, relating to early Scheyville Government Agricultural Training farm era;
- Log bridge over the Longneck Creek, relating to the early Scheyville Government Agricultural Training Farm period;
- The Avenue, relating to the early Scheyville Government Agricultural Training farm era;
- Site of the social hall and tennis court, relating to the early and later Scheyville Government Agricultural Training farm era;
- Farm Manager's house, relating to the early and later Scheyville Government Agricultural Training farm era;
- Site of orchard adjacent to the Farm Managers house, second phase of the Scheyville Government Agricultural Training farm

1919–1929

- New Dairy, relating to the third phase of the Scheyville Government Agricultural Training farm;
- Double Silos, relating to the third phase of the Scheyville Government Agricultural Training farm;
- Site of vegetable garden, pump house and existing dam, relating to the Scheyville Government Agricultural Training Farm;
- Sites of Orchards, relating to the Scheyville Government Agricultural Training farm;
- Site of poultry yards, relating to Scheyville Government Agricultural Training farm,

In 1929 the establishment of the quadrangle accommodation and facilities on the ridge marked the reorientation of the farm and relocation of land use in the area. There are a number of buildings and features in the ridge top location, often known as the Scheyville camp because of its military uses, that are still extant. These include;

- The Interwar Mediterranean style quadrangle buildings with Georgian Revival elements, (roof lanterns, door fanlights and 12 panelled windows). Designed by the Government Architects Office in 1928, these buildings use architectural elements such as the gabled roofs, long, deep verandahs which were the trademark of the Government Architect's Office at the time.
- An important feature of the buildings is the rainwater recovery system with gutters connected into standing water tanks and underground storage tanks.
- The central courtyard contains its original path layout and the walkway connecting the dormitory with the kitchen/dining room block. The courtyard still retains the Phoenix palms which are remnant original planting and also the cypress planted in 1936.
- The administration block is located at the northern end of the quadrangle complex. It accommodated the administration of the later phase of the Government Training Farm, the WWII military uses, the Migrant Holding Centre and the Officer Training Unit. It currently houses the administrative offices for the National Park.
- The east and west flanks of the quadrangle complex were originally two dormitories for the Dreadnought Migrant Boys training at Scheyville Government Agricultural Training Farm. They have since been adapted to single person accommodate for officer accommodation during WWII, post-WWII Migrant Holding Centre staff and later Training Officers for the Officer Training Unit.
- The Kitchen and dining room stand at the southern end of the quadrangle to the administration block. This was first used by the Government Training Farm boys and staff and later by the officers of the 73rd Australian Search Light Company and Paratroops Battalion and later staff of the Migrant Holding centre. During the Officer Training Unit period this building was the officers' mess for the Officer Training Unit.
- Two large SAARS Huts sit to the south of the officera' mess / dining hall. SAARS huts are prefabricated semi circular structures commonly mistaken for "Nissen huts". SAARS huts are also known as Quonset huts and the two at Scheyville are the very large Quonset warehouse type huts. These two structures were installed to provide dining facilities for the Migrant Holding Centre. Timber kitchens were attached to the north end of the hut and the hut proper was for dining and recreation. In fact the whole of the western hut was used for dining and the eastern hut was a combination dining room, Adult Education Centre and recreation area. Later this area became a kindergarten. A garden/playground lay between the two huts and a boiler house was situated at the northern end of the garden. During the OTU period, the Eastern SAARS hut was divided in two and the northern end used as a Mess for regular army Other Ranks and the other end became the gymnasium. The western hut was the Cadet's Mess and recreation area complete with bar. The garden was divided in two to provide outdoor recreation areas for the Other Ranks and the Cadets.
- The concrete foundations for the "lines" of prefabricated accommodation are situated on the slope to the east of the quadrangle buildings. These accommodated the migrant families at the Holding Centre and later were adapted for use by the Officer Cadets. Two ablution blocks originally constructed for the Migrant Holding Centre and later used by the army are still in situ.
- On the western side of Ridge Road across from the administration building are situated three Nissen huts which operated as a store for the Migrant Holding Centre and as stores and quartermaster's stores during the OTU period.
- There is also an area known as Transport Compound No C situated on the western side of Ridge Road and a little south of the end of the SAARS huts. This was established by the Officer Training Unit.
- The Parade Ground area is situated on the south western side of the quadrangle building and comprises a large, level area of tarmac. This feature was constructed during the Officer Training Unit period.
- An area near the water tanks are the remains of the OTU challenge course. This was established during the Officer Training Unit period.
- The front gates on Scheyville Road and the monument in front of the Administration building. The gates were constructed during the OTU period and the Monument was established in recent years to commemorate the various military uses of Scheyville and marking the death in the Vietnam hostilities of 8 officers who trained at Scheyville.

Archaeological evidence and remnants of the Pitt Town Village Settlement, Casual Labour Farm and the early phase of the Scheyville Government Agricultural Training School are found in the basin near Longneck Creek to the southeast of the quadrangle buildings.

Fabric relating to the later phase of the Scheyville Government Agricultural Training Farm, the WWII uses, post WWII Migrant Holding Centre and OTU periods is in varying condition. The quadrangle buildings have been subject to termite activity but they still stand and are undergoing conservation works with plans to reuse these buildings. The Administration building is in good condition and is used as the Scheyville National Park Central Office.

The SAARS Huts are in disrepair but are still standing as are the Nissen huts. The garden adjoining the SAARS huts is overgrown but evidence relating to its use remains. The boilers located near the SAARS huts remain standing in a state of deterioration due to the destruction of the building originally containing them and their subsequent exposure to the elements.

The "lines" of prefabricated accommodation and ablutions blocks for the migrant and OTU period have been demolished (except for one ablution block) but the concrete foundations remain which clearly demonstrates the layout and function of the "camp" area overall. The parade ground is in a state of disrepair but still an important and eminently readable part of the landscape

The challenge course is still evident although not completely intact.

There are a number of plantings, roadways and features such as the obelisk and entrance gates that are in good condition.

=== Area 3: The Dreadnought Farm area ===
The area lying between Dormitory Hill Road, Midson Road, and Scheyville Road. This area was the central to the Dreadnought Farm.

This area has archaeological potential relating to the Scheyville Government Agricultural Training Farm.

=== Area 4: Migrant Holding Centre Sewage Works and Officer Training Unit remnant structures ===
The area between Scheyville Road, Pitt Town Dural Road, Avondale Road and Schofields Road. This area contains the sewage treatment works installed during the Migrant Holding Centre period. It also contains remnant structures relating to the Officer Training Unit period such as the rifle range and the obstacle course.

The sewage works for the Migrant Holding Centre and OTU periods is still in situ although deteriorating. Remains of the obstacle course are to be found although they are in poor condition.

=== Condition and integrity ===
The long history of European occupation and use of the area has heavily disturbed some areas and is likely to have destroyed many Aboriginal sites, however a total of 16 sites have been recorded on the national park. The highest number of sites were found on the margins of Longneck Lagoon and along Longneck and Llewellyn Creeks. The sites, which include stone cores and occupation sites, have generally been heavily disturbed by previous farming activities and floods and are not easily recognisable or interpreted to visitors. No Aboriginal sites have been found on Pitt Town Nature Reserve, however it is possible that sites and artefacts are buried beneath alluvial deposits.

A conservation plan prepared by Edds (1991) identified the following sites and structures as being of considerable to high significance and that consequently should be retained as archaeological sites relating to use of the area prior to 1929; the twin silos from the Dreadnought era (built around 1930); the 1929 Georgian revival style masonry buildings and quadrangle; the palm trees and avenue of pine trees to and around the buildings, which may have been part of the architect's design for the buildings; the two large Nissen huts used during the migrant period; the 1929 electrical sub-station; and the small water storage tank built in 1911. Gates erected during the Officer Training period remain as evidence of the involvement of the place with the Vietnam War.

The areas now Scheyville National Park and Pitt Town Nature Reserve, like much of the fertile Cumberland Plain, have been subject to vegetation clearing since the early days of European settlement in Australia. Approximately 30% of Scheyville National Park and the majority of Pitt Town Nature Reserve are still covered with introduced and native grasses.

Most introduced plants within Scheyville National Park occur in the previously cleared areas of the park. Species include African love grass (Eragrostis curvula), blackberry (Rubus fruticosus), lantana (Lantana camara), bridal veil creeper (Myrsiphyllum asparagoides), mother-of-millions (Bryophyllum syksii), prickly pear (Opuntia stricta), paspalum (Paspalum dilatatum), kikuyu (Pennisetum clandestinum), common couch (Cynodon dactylon), willow (Salix spp.), oleander (Nerium oleander) and liquidambar (Liquidambar styraciflua). Blackberry is of particular concern, with large clumps occurring in cleared areas and along Longneck Creek.

Introduced animals can destroy native vegetation, compete with and prey on native animals, adversely affect the breeding and feeding of native animals, and can detract from the experience for people visiting natural areas. The use of Scheyville National Park and Pitt Town Nature Reserve as commons mean that both have been grazed by domestic stock for long periods of time. Grazing ceased in the nature reserve in 1991 and in the national park in 1997.

Introduced animals observed in the national park and nature reserve include the red fox (Vulpes vulpes), cat (Felis catus), dog (Canis familiaris), rabbit (Oryctolagus cuniculus), brown hare (Lepis capensis), black rat (Rattus rattus), house mouse (Mus musculus), starling (Sturnus vulgaris), sparrow (Passer domesticus) and Indian myna (Acridotheres tristis). In addition, sheep and cattle from neighbouring properties have been occasionally observed in the national park and nature reserve. European carp (Cyprinus carpio) are present within both Longneck and Pitt Town Lagoons. Carp are of concern as they are believed to compete with native species and contribute to muddiness of the water and loss of aquatic vegetation.

The national park retains its ability to demonstrate the reasons for its natural and cultural significance, and the interplay between the values for which it was established.

=== Modifications and dates ===
- 1804: Gazetted as a Common and subject to clearing and grazing
- From 1850s to 1930s: sandstone quarrying
- 1893: a central portion of the old Common was established as a cooperative farm - 3 dams established on Longneck Creek and a well dug. erection of timber housing, farm buildings and other amenities including a schoolhouse in 1894.
- 1896: the area became a Casual Labour farm
- 1911: The farm taken over by the Scheyville Government Agricultural Training Farm and while retaining some existing facilities developed many new buildings including dormitories, dining room, ablutions blocks, recreation facilities, farm manager's residence and many new farm buildings. The Avenue was established as the main roadway into the farm.
- 1928–1929:
  - construction of the quadrangle buildings containing two large dormitories and administration wing and a kitchen dining room
  - reorientation of farming activities out of the area around Longneck creek to the ridgetop. Many new farm buildings erected including the double silos new dairy and piggery. Importantly a new entrance and roadway was constructed (Ridge Road) superseding the Avenue as the way into the farm.
- WWII: Quadrangle buildings adapted to provide accommodation for officers and an officers' mess and a sergeants' mess.
- In 1949 in preparation for the use of Scheyville as a Migrant Holding Centre a substantial number of prefabricated huts were installed on site for use as accommodation. Two SAARS huts were installed and adapted as dining and recreation accommodation and later to house a kindergarten.
- 1949: quadrangle buildings further modified to meet need of Migrant Holding Centre Staff
- All these buildings were again adapted to suit the needs of the Officer Training Unit when it took up residence in 1973. The Farm manager's residence was at this time refurbished to house the commandant. Physical training courses and small firearms ranges were set up in the paddocks surrounding the Scheyville camp.
- In 1977–78 the quadrangle buildings and prefabricated hut accommodation was refurbished for use by the Hawkesbury CAE.
- During the latter half of the 1980s the Police Tactical Response Group used of the site a number of the buildings in this area were damaged.
- In the initial years of NPWS management of the site (from 1996) a number of the hut buildings were demolished.

== Heritage listing ==
Scheyville National Park is of State heritage significance as it demonstrates a continuous history of significant use since pre-European settlement when the area supported the Dharug people with plentiful food supplies. The park also contains a number of historic features and places which demonstrate the early settlement of the Cumberland Plain, farming, defence and migrant uses of the area, and is significant as a relatively large surviving element of the first commons declared in the colony. The ongoing use and development of the area closely reflects and articulates the economic and agricultural development of the colony and later the development of the nation in relation to its autonomy, defence and populating the land. It is a rare example of a site demonstrating the continuous layers of history which reflects the history of the State and the Nation.

In addition to its culturally historic values, the Scheyville National Park's natural values demonstrate a significant phase of evolution in the natural history of the Hawkesbury area. The park contains the largest and most intact remnants of Cumberland Plain native plant and animal communities which once dominated Western Sydney. As such it offers a living snapshot of the early natural history of Western Sydney and the State.

The state heritage significance of the Scheyville National Park is enhanced through its close association with a number of people important to the history and development of the colony and later State and Nation such as Governor Phillip King, William Francis Schey, Sir John Overall, Brigadier Ian Geddes, Tim Fischer and Jeff Kennet. The Park has aesthetic significance at a State level as an extensive landscape of woodlands and wetlands with many birds and wildlife.

The place retains significant and special associations to a number of identifiable groups of people located through the State such as the former Dreadnought Boys, members of the 73rd Searchlight Company and 1st Parachute Battalion, a number of post-WWII migrants to Australia and former Officer Training Unit cadets. It is of State heritage significance for these strong social associations.

The site has State heritage significance for its potential archaeological evidence of Aboriginal occupation as well as potential archaeological resource relating to all layers of the site's rich history as a Common, a farming concern, military uses and migrant hostel. This potential resource is capable of delivering a deeper understanding of the history of the site and the way in which it was used over time.

The site is of State heritage significance as a rare and unique site containing evidence of all layers of significant historical use which closely reflects the history of the State and the Nation. It is also rare as a site containing the most extensive remnant vegetation on the Cumberland Plain and providing habitat for endangered vegetation and birdlife.

The park is significant as a representative example of all its land uses over time, including its most recent use as a National Park. It is representative of the national park concept that was introduced into Australia through the establishment of the (Royal) National Park in 1879.

Scheyville National Park was listed on the New South Wales State Heritage Register on 9 April 2010 having satisfied the following criteria.

The place is important in demonstrating the course, or pattern, of cultural or natural history in New South Wales.

Scheyville National Park is of state heritage significance as it demonstrates a continuous history of significant use since pre-European settlement when the area supported the Dharug people with plentiful food supplies. The park also contains a number of historic features and places which demonstrate the early settlement of the Cumberland Plain, farming, defence and migrant uses of the area, and is significant as a relatively large surviving element of the first commons declared in the colony. The ongoing use and development of the area closely reflects and articulates the economic and agricultural development of the colony and later the development of the nation in relation to its autonomy, defence and populating the land. It is a rare example of a site demonstrating the continuous layers of history which reflects the history of the State and the Nation.

The park is of historic significance at a state level as a number of the park's boundaries are those of the Nelson (later Pitt Town) Common declared in NSW by Governor King in 1804. The 6 commons declared at that time were the earliest officially declared in the colony and the 954 ha Scheyville National Park is the largest unsettled remnant of those Commons. In addition, land uses of the colonial common such as quarrying are still evident.

Scheyville National Park is of State heritage significance as the site of three rare and often controversial social and agricultural ventures in the late 19th and early 20th centuries: the Pitt Town Co-operative Labour Settlement for the unemployed; a Casual Labour Farm for men who could not find work through ill health; and the Scheyville Government Agricultural Training Farm, a Dreadnought Farm for English boys, the earliest of the child immigrant training farms to operate and an agricultural; training farm for women during WWI. It was also one of the major migrant reception centre in Australia during the 1950s and early 1960s.

Scheyville National Park is historically significant at a State level for its long associations with the military forces, being used as a military training camp during World War II for Australia's first parachute battalion and the 73rd Search Light Company which saw distinguished Service in New Guinea during WWII. It was also the first officer training School for National Servicemen during the Vietnam War.

In addition to these culturally historic values, the Scheyville National Park's natural values demonstrate a significant phase of evolution in the natural history of the Hawkesbury area. The park contains the largest and most intact remnants of Cumberland Plain native plant and animal communities which once dominated Western Sydney. As such it offers a living snapshot of the early natural history of Western Sydney.

The place has a strong or special association with a person, or group of persons, of importance of cultural or natural history of New South Wales's history.

Scheyville's historic significance at a state level is enhanced through its association with a number of groups and individuals important in the history of NSW. Scheyville National Park is significant for its association with the Dharug Nation who occupied the area for at least 13,000 years prior to colonial settlement, and for the ongoing associations between contemporary Dharug communities and the parklands (HO)

The first important figure associated with the site is Governor King, who reserved an area which includes the Scheyville National Park as a common in 1804.

The driving force in establishing the Dreadnought scheme and Scheyville Agricultural training farm for young British migrants was William Schey. Schey was keenly involved in the politics of labour and industry from late 1877 through to the early decade of the 20th century. He was a pioneering unionist with the Railways and Tramways Employees Association, a parliamentarian tirelessly campaigning for the 8-hour day. He became chief labour commissioner in the late 1890s and director of State Labour Bureau in the first years of the new Federation.

The commander of the 1st Parachute Battalion, the first airborne combat troop in Australia which was encamped at Scheyville was Lt. Col. Sir John Overall who had received the Military Cross and Bar for distinguished Service in WWII. In civilian life he returned to his work as a distinguished architect where his work with the National Capital Development Commission made a significant contribution to the development of Canberra. He was awarded the RAIA Gold Medal in 1982 and played an important part in the development and oversight of the construction of the new Parliament House.

The first and longest commandant of the OTU at Scheyville was Brigadier Ian Geddes, a soldier with a long and distinguished record of active service during WWII both in Europe and Asia, during the Malayan Emergency and finally in Vietnam. In Vietnam he headed a team of 128 members of the Australian Assistance Group whose task it was to instruct South Vietnamese and Cambodian Troops before the ceasefire discussion were concluded. Geddes also had a long and influential career in military education at the Joint Services Staff College in Canberra, Scheyville OTU and has several achievement awards in his honour and also a number of military educational facilities named after him.

The leadership training offered by the Officer Training Unit at Scheyville produced many world leaders who used their skills during the Vietnam war and after, two significant graduates who have gone on to influence the direction of the State and Nation are Jeff Kennet and Tim Fischer.

Scheyville National Park is significant for its associations with community groups involved in the environmental conservation movement in western Sydney during the late 20th century, including the National Parks Association and Concerned Residents Against Development of Longneck Lagoon (CRADLE).

The place is important in demonstrating aesthetic characteristics and/or a high degree of creative or technical achievement in New South Wales.

Scheyville National Park is of state significance as an extensive landscape of woodlands and wetlands that crown the high land above the rural and village countryside of the Pitt Town Bottoms and the Hawkesbury Valley. Within the park the landscapes have aesthetic value for the combinations of eucalypt woodlands, open grasslands and shady glades with reedy water bodies and many evident birds and other wildlife. Because of its height above the surrounding plains and valleys, there are clear views over the Hawkesbury River and villages such as Pitt Town and Windsor towards the rugged escarpments and peaks of the Blue Mountains. It is an increasingly rare example of such landscape combinations on the western Cumberland Plain.

The inter-war period built complex in the centre of the national park has aesthetic significance as an example of institutional design in a Mediterranean style, with all the principal buildings hierarchically arranged around a central courtyard on top of a commanding knoll. The complex design is supported by the arrangement of the central driveway which features sandstone gateways from the Officer Training establishment and a central memorial stone obelisk that commemorates the various military forces previously stationed in the complex.

The place has a strong or special association with a particular community or cultural group in New South Wales for social, cultural or spiritual reasons.

Scheyville National Park is of local and regional significance for its associations with contemporary Aboriginal communities in Western Sydney for whom it retains memories and physical evidence of historical settlement by the Dharug people, and of their resistance and adaptation to colonial settlement of the Hawkesbury Valley and Cumberland Plain.

Scheyville National Park meets this criterion of State significance because it retains a significant and special association to a number of identifiable groups of people who are now located throughout NSW and beyond.

While their number is diminishing the place has a special association for the surviving former Dreadnought boys who trained there and later went onto work on farms throughout NSW. Those surviving are mainly from the period 1919 to 1939 and their oral testimony evidences the lasting association they have with Scheyville as a significant formative experience in their lives and careers.

Similarly, the place is held in regard by the members of the 73rd Searchlight Company and the 1st Parachute Battalion who camped and trained in the fields surrounding the "Scheyville camp".

The buildings and surrounds at Scheyville are associated with the experience of many migrants who made Scheyville their home when they first settled in Australia. A demonstration of the association many migrants have with the place was the "Back to Scheyville Day" held in 2005, where many people revisited their experience of first settling in Australia and reconnected with old friends and acquaintances.

Scheyville has enduring association with the former officer cadets who trained there. Cadets who have contributed to the oral history of their time training at Scheyville note their experinece being "profoundly character and life-changing". The OTU regularly holds reunions at the site and have established a monument at Scheyville to commemorate their fellow officers who died in action in Vietnam, as well as those associated with the earlier military uses of the site, the 73rd Searchlight Company and the 1st Parachute Battalion.

The place has potential to yield information that will contribute to an understanding of the cultural or natural history of New South Wales.

Scheyville National Park is of significance for the research potential of the archaeological evidence of Aboriginal occupation found on the margins of Longneck Lagoon and along Longneck and Llewellyn Creeks, including stone cores and occupation sites.

It also contains significant archaeological potential, known archaeological resources and remnant fabric which can provide an understanding of the layout and functioning of the place during all its periods of use including its earliest European use as a Common and then later when it accommodated the Pitt Town Settlers. There is archaeology and remnant fabric relating to its 3 phases of use as a Government Agricultural Training Farm for British youth and also of its periods of military use and as a Migrant Holding Centre.

In addition, the Park as the largest intact area of Cumberland Plains vegetation the area is an important research resource to study and protect several rare and endangered species of fauna and flora. The natural areas of the national park are becoming increasingly significant as areas for researching the impacts of changing flora and fauna composition and ecological communities in response to urbanisation and other human-induced environment changes (HO).

The place possesses uncommon, rare or endangered aspects of the cultural or natural history of New South Wales.

It meets this criterion of State significance because as it is a site unique in its ability to demonstrate all the layers of its significant historical use which closely reflect and articulate the history of the state and the nation. Scheyville National Park is of State significance for the rarity of several of its constituent elements.

The naturally vegetated areas of the national park represent the most extensive remnant of vegetation on Wianamatta Shale remaining on the Cumberland Plain, notably the Cumberland Plain Grey Box/ Ironbark Woodland (listed as an endangered community under the Threatened Species Conservation Act 1995), as well as Castlereagh Scribbly Gum Woodland and Shale/Gravel Transition Forest.

The national park protects three threatened native plants and a number of regionally rare plant species. Ten birds listed under the Threatened Species Conservation Act have been recorded in the national park (PoM).

The place is important in demonstrating the principal characteristics of a class of cultural or natural places/environments in New South Wales.

The Park is of significance as a representative example of all its land uses over time; as a colonial Common, a cooperative farming concern and agricultural training farm, as an encampment site for the military forces during WWII, as a migrant holding hostel for displaced persons at the end of WWII and as an Officer Training Unit specifically set up for National Servicemen during the Vietnam War.

Scheyville National Park is of local and regional significance for its flora and fauna communities that are representative of the native ecologies of the Cumberland Plain.

The park itself is representative of the national park concept that was introduced into Australia through the establishment of the Royal National Park in 1879, as evidenced by its establishment in 1996 as one of the most recent metropolitan national parks gazetted in New South Wales .

== See also ==
- Protected areas of New South Wales
