= Nelson, New South Wales =

Nelson
- Suburb
- Interactive map of Nelson
- Coordinates: 33°38′45″S 150°55′19″E
- Country: Australia
- State: New South Wales
- City: Sydney
- LGA: The Hills Shire
- Location: 42 km (26 mi) NW of Sydney CBD

Government
  - State electorate: Castle Hill
  - Federal division: Greenway
- Elevation: 51 m (167 ft)

Population
  - Total: 460 (2021 census)
- Postcode: 2765
Suburbs around Nelson
Gables	Annangrove	Annangrove
Gables	Nelson	Annangrove
Box Hill	Rouse Hill	Rouse Hill

Nelson is a suburb of Sydney, in the state of New South Wales, Australia, 42 kilometres north-west of the Sydney central business district in the local government area of The Hills Shire. It is part of the Hills District.

== Population ==
In the 2021 Australian Census, the population of the suburb of Nelson was approximately 460 people. The gender distribution was close to balanced, with males making up about 50.5% and females about 49.5% of the total population. The median age of residents was 47 years.
