= Gables, New South Wales =

Gables
- Suburb
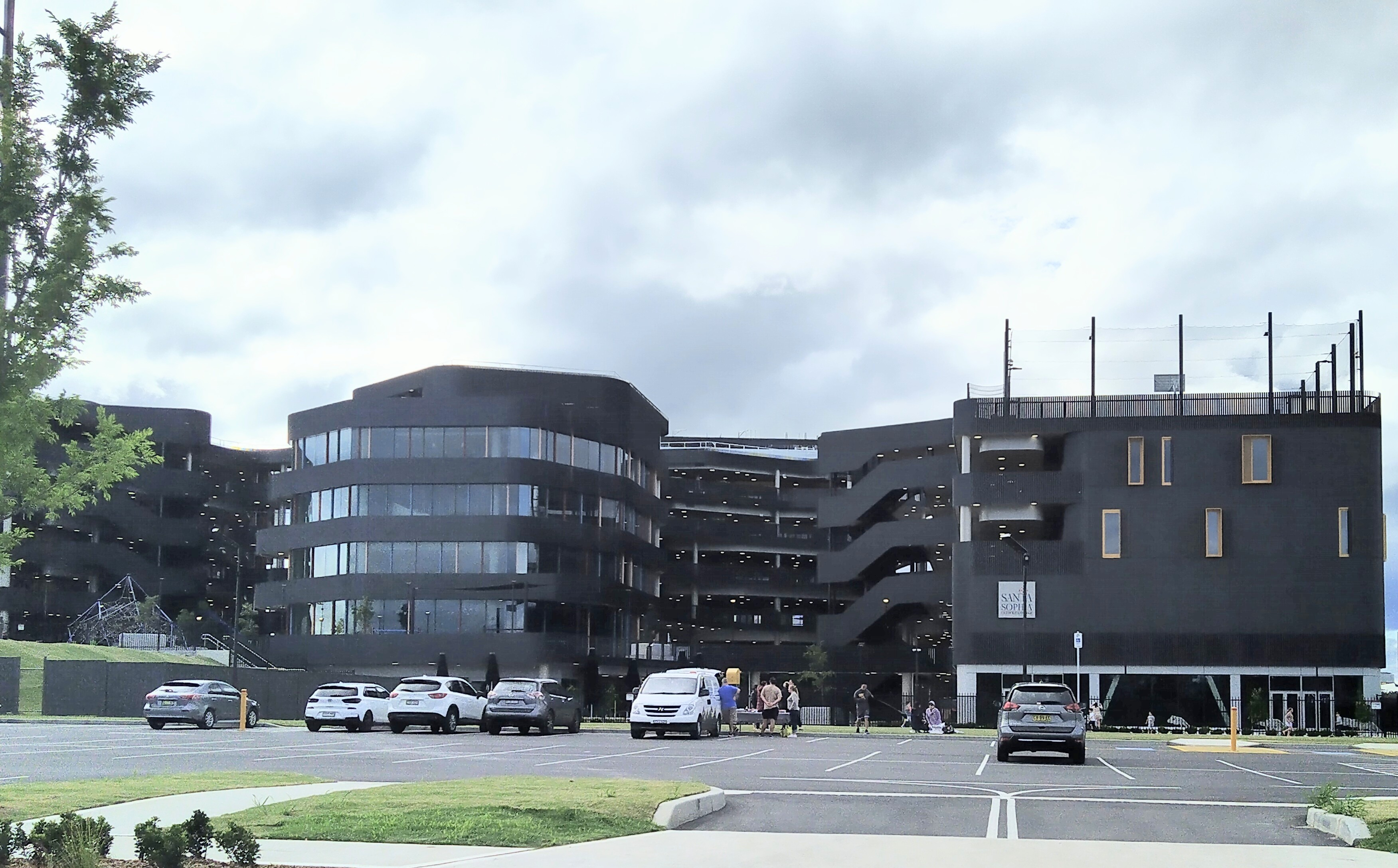
- Santa Sophia Catholic College at Gables

- Interactive map of Gables
- Coordinates: 33°37′48″S 150°54′20″E
- Country: Australia
- State: New South Wales
- City: Sydney
- LGA: The Hills Shire
- Location: 52 km (32 mi) NW of Sydney CBD
- Established: 2020

Government
  - State electorate: Hawkesbury
  - Federal division: Greenway
- Elevation: 42 m (138 ft)

Population
  - Total: 3,339 (SAL 2021)
- Postcode: 2765
Suburbs around Gables
Scheyville	Maraylya	Maraylya
Oakville	Gables	Nelson
Vineyard	Box Hill	Nelson

Gables is a suburb of Sydney in the state of New South Wales, Australia. Gables is 52 kilometres west of the Sydney central business district in the local government area of The Hills Shire. Gables is located in the Hills District in the North-west of Sydney.

== History ==
The suburb of Gables was originally the site of a dairy farm owned by Robert Hurrell. This dairy was divided into two parts due to its size and was named Blue Gables and Red Gables. Red Gables Road, which cuts through the middle of the suburb, and The Gables, an ongoing residential development since 2015, were named after the dairy farms. The name of the suburb was subsequently derived from this as well.

The Greenfields master-planned community was initially developed by the Baiada family and Celestino Developments before being sold to Stockland in 2020 for $415 million.

Gables was gazetted on 17 July 2020. A large portion of Gables was previously part of the suburb of Box Hill and a smaller portion in the north was part of the suburb of Maraylya.

== Education ==
Santa Sophia Catholic College's permanent campus in Gables began construction in June 2020 and opened for learning on 8 November 2021, ready for Term 1 2022. The school caters Kindergarten to Year 12 students. The school is located at 1 Lakefront Crescent, at the corner of Fontana Parade and Red Gables Road.

== Residential areas ==
The Gables is a residential development within the suburb that is currently being developed by Stockland. It is the biggest master planned community in The Hills District and covers 330 hectares (820 acres). When The Gables was first planned in 2015, it was planned to comprise over 4,000 dwellings, a primary school, two sports fields, a 5.5-hectare (14-acre) town centre and a 4-hectare (9.9-acre) lake central to the development.

Celestino was the original developer of The Gables until March 2020, when Celestino sold the remaining 293 hectares (720 acres) of undeveloped land to Stockland for A$415 million. At the time of the sale, Celestino had already developed 994 dwellings. Stockland planned to continue developing 1,900 dwellings over the remaining life of the project.

== Transport ==
The suburb is serviced by two bus services operated by Busways, and one service operated by CDC NSW:

- 643: Gables to Rouse Hill station
- 740: Box Hill (Gables) to Rouse Hill station
- 741: Box Hill (Gables) to Riverstone station, with selected services commencing from Oakville via Maraylya on school days
