= Scheyville =

- Suburb
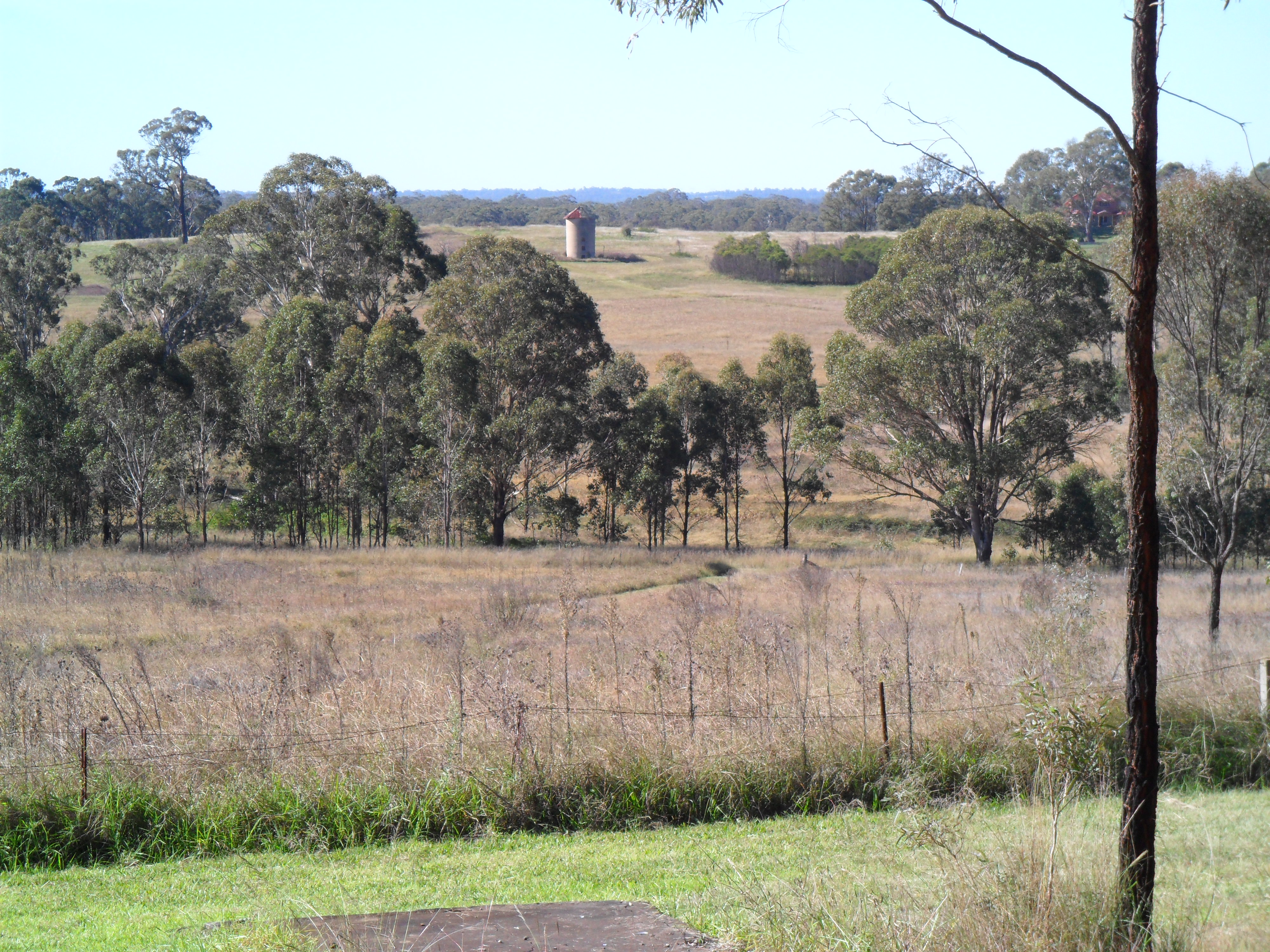
- Training farm fields and early 1900s silo

- Interactive map of Scheyville
- Country: Australia
- State: New South Wales
- City: Sydney
- LGA: City of Hawkesbury
- Location: 54 km (34 mi) NW of Sydney CBD

Government
  - State electorate: Hawkesbury
  - Federal division: Macquarie
- Elevation: 39 m (128 ft)

Population
  - Total: 7 (2021 census)
- Postcode: 2756
Suburbs around Scheyville
Windsor	Windsor	Maraylya
Pitt Town	Scheyville	Maraylya
Oakville	Vineyard	Gables

Scheyville ( /ˌskaɪˈvɪl/) is a suburb of Sydney, Australia. It is located 54 kilometres (34 mi) northwest of the Sydney central business district in the Hawkesbury local government area.

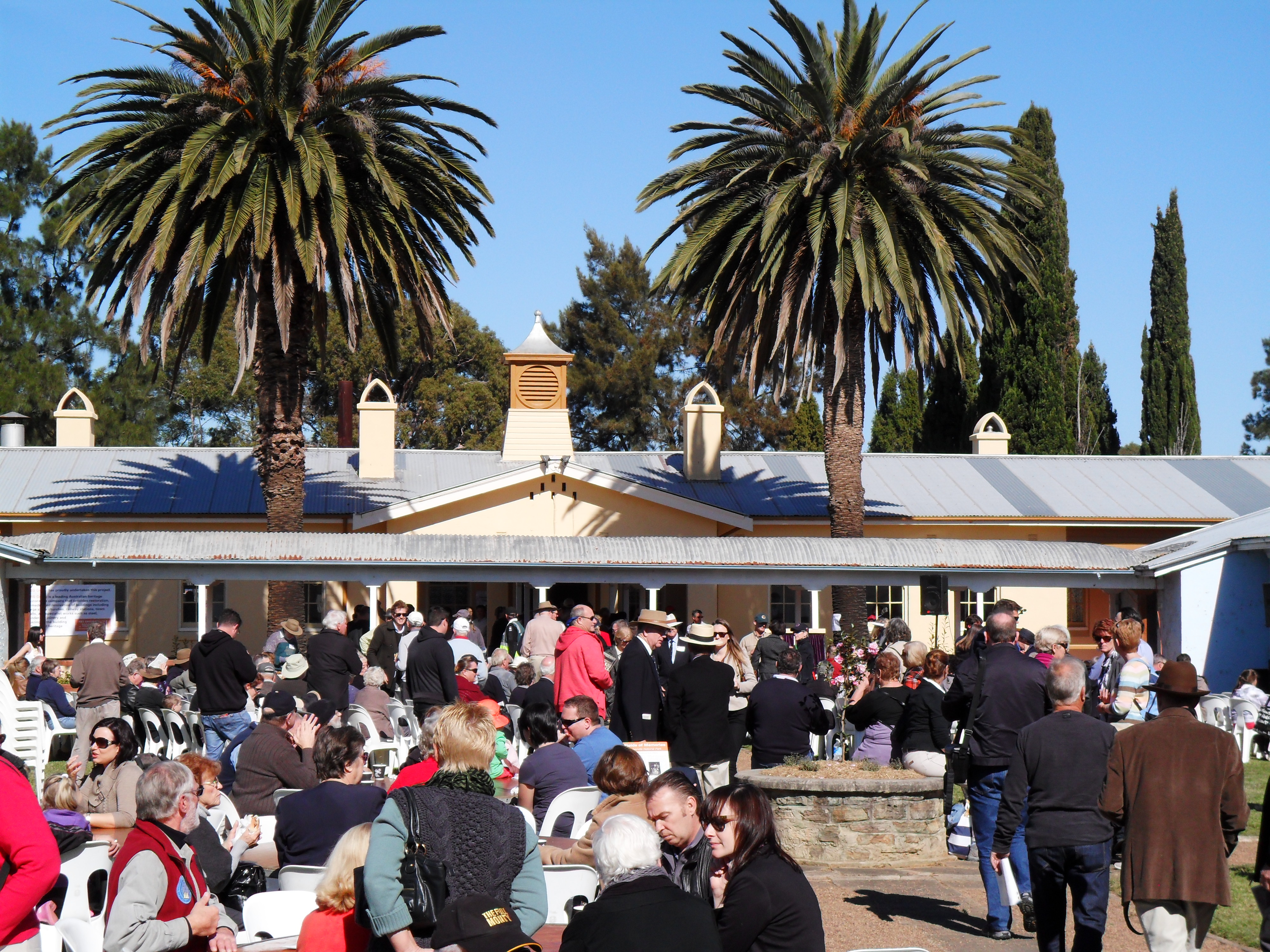
Scheyville Centenary 2011

== Military history ==
From 1965 to 1973, Scheyville was the site of Officer Training Unit, Scheyville (OTU Scheyville), established to provide training to meet the growing need for officers for the new conscripts called up for service under the national service scheme.

== Parks ==
In 1997 large tracts of land in the area were dedicated as the Scheyville National Park. The area is named after William Schey, MLA, the Member for Redfern and later Darlington between 1887 and 1898.

The park is listed on the New South Wales Heritage Register.
