= Dreadnought scheme =

Farm worker migration scheme of Brits to Australia in the early 20th century

The Dreadnought Scheme was a program designed to promote and assist the migration of British youths willing to become farm workers in Australia. Funds which had been raised by public subscription for the purchase of a battleship were diverted to establish the Dreadnought Scheme when the Commonwealth instead decided to build an Australian Navy.

On arrival in Australia, the teenage boys were assigned to a state government farm for three months of agricultural training. More than half of the boys who participated in the scheme were sent to the Scheyville Farm. Here the boys learnt skills such as shearing, horse riding, cropping, dairying, butchering and farm equipment maintenance. On completion of the training period the boys could be sent to work on any farm in the state. Most of the Dreadnought graduates were employed on dairy farms in the Northern Rivers area.

The scheme was put on hold during World War I. During the war the farm was used briefly for the detainment of 87 German citizens who had been taken from boats moored in Sydney Harbour. Later, the farm was used to train Australian women in agricultural skills while men were at war.

The scheme resumed in 1921 but in 1930 was again stopped, this time as a result of the Great Depression. By this time 4,500 British boys had been trained at Scheyville. During the Depression the Scheyville Farm took about 500 Australian city boys annually and gave them four months of training in basic farming practices. The boys were found suitable positions on farms on completion of their training. The Scheyville Training Farm era ended in 1940 when the farm was taken over by the Commonwealth for use as a military school during World War II.
