= Metro Trains Sydney =

Operator of the Sydney Metro

- Trade name: Metro Trains Sydney
- Type: Joint Venture
- Industry: Public transport
- Founded: 10 September 2014
- Area served: Sydney, New South Wales, Australia
- Key people: Oliver Bratton (CEO)
- Products: Metro transport services
- Owner: MTR Corporation (60%); John Holland Group (20%); UGL Rail (20%)
- Website: metrotrains-sydney.com.au

Metro Trains Sydney Pty. Limited (MTS) is the operator of the Sydney Metro North West & Bankstown Line. It is a joint venture between Hong Kong–based MTR Corporation, John Holland Group and UGL Rail formed in September 2014. It operates the network with a fleet of 45 Alstom Metropolis trains under a 15-year contract.

The three constituent companies are also partners in the Metro Trains Melbourne joint venture, which has operated the Melbourne suburban network since 2009.

== History ==
In June 2014, Northwest Rapid Transit (NRT), a consortium of Hong Kong–based MTR Corporation, John Holland, CPB Contractors, UGL Rail and Plenary Group, was selected by Transport for NSW to build stations, procure trains and operate services on the Sydney Metro Northwest in a $3.7 billion public–private partnership. The contract was formally awarded by the New South Wales Government in September 2014. During the construction, John Holland and CPB Contractors built new stations at Tallawong, Rouse Hill, Kellyville, Bella Vista, Norwest, Hills Showground, Castle Hill and Cherrybrook.

As part of the consortium, MTR Corporation, John Holland and UGL Rail formed the Metro Trains Sydney joint venture in September 2014 to operate metro services when the line opened. The line opened on 26 May 2019, with MTS operating Metro North West Line services on the line. The line was extended through the Sydney CBD on 19 August 2024 to Sydenham.
