= Bella Vista metro station =

Sydney Metro railway station

Bella Vista
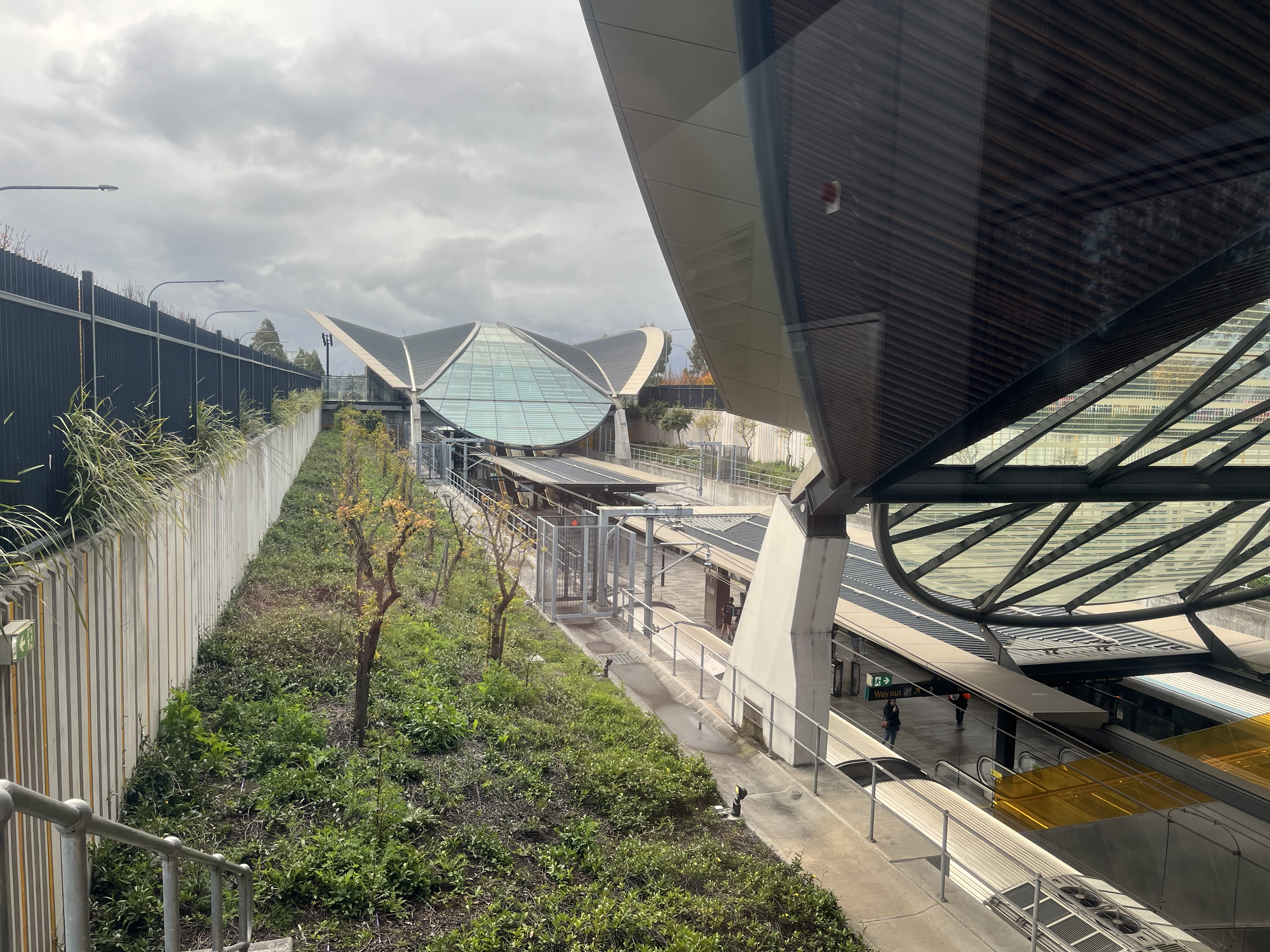
- Station platforms in a trench

General information
- Location: Lexington Drive, Bella Vista; New South Wales; Australia
- Coordinates: 33°43′46″S 150°56′37″E
- Elevation: 6 m (20 ft) below ground level
- Owner: New South Wales Government via Transport Asset Manager of New South Wales
- Operator: Metro Trains Sydney
- Distance: 28km from Chatswood
- Platforms: 2
- Train operators: Metro Trains Sydney
- Connections: Bus

Construction
- Structure type: Open cut
- Parking: 800 spaces
- Cycle facilities: 30 spaces
- Accessible: Yes

History
- Opened: 26 May 2019

Passengers
- 2023: 1,288,610 (year); 3,530 (daily) (Sydney Metro)

Services
Preceding station	Sydney Metro	Following station
Kellyville towards Tallawong	M1 Metro North West & Bankstown Line	Norwest towards Bankstown
Location

Bella Vista railway station is a Sydney Metro station on the western edge of the Norwest Business Park in Sydney, New South Wales, Australia. The station serves the Metro North West & Bankstown Line and was built as part of the Sydney Metro Northwest project. The station initially served trains to Chatswood between 2019 and 2024, before the Northwest & Bankstown Line was extended to Sydenham in August 2024, and later to Bankstown in October 2026.

== History ==
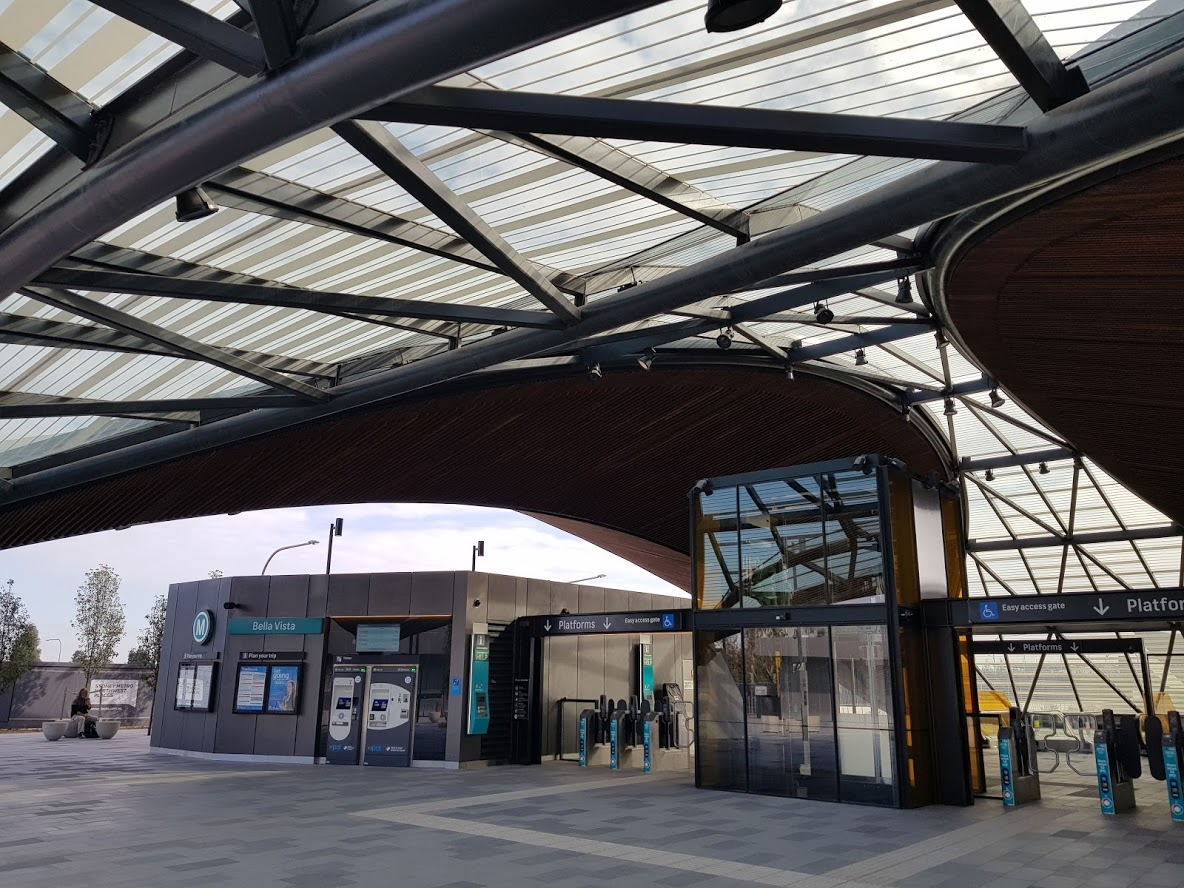
Concourse

The NSW Government announced a future railway line to Castle Hill, south-east of Bella Vista, as part of its Action for Public Transport strategy in 1998. Bella Vista was to be served by a bus rapid transit connection to the new rail terminus. A longer-term plan presented by Co-ordinator General of Rail Ron Christie three years later included a 'Mungerie Park Line', with a station at Burns Road (now called Memorial Avenue) in Kellyville – about one kilometre north of the present Bella Vista Station site. In the years that followed, Burns Road Station formed part of successive north-western rail proposals, including the Metropolitan Rail Expansion Plan in 2005 and a short-lived metro proposal in 2008.

Burns Road opened as a North West T-way bus station in 2007.

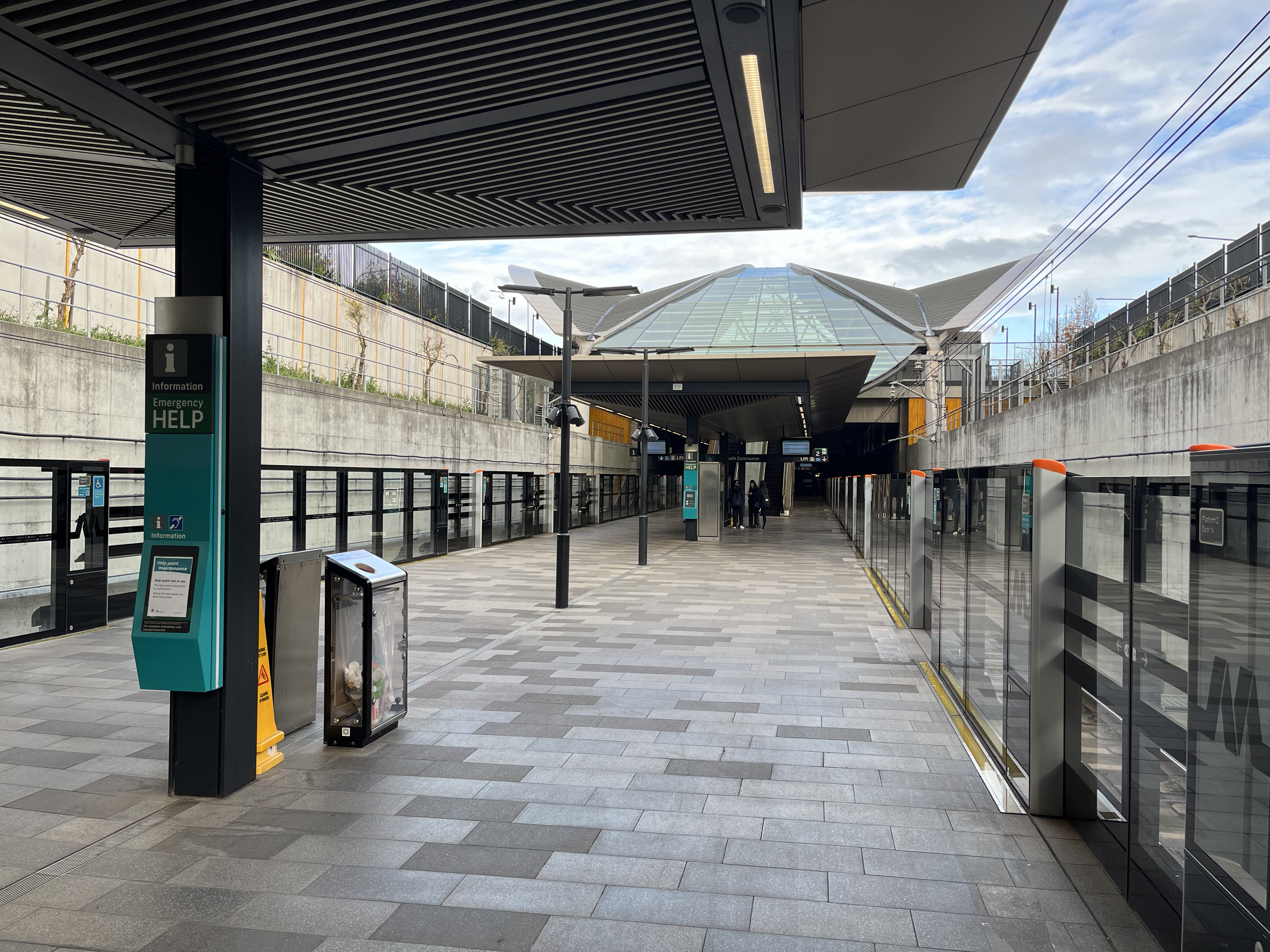
Platforms

Work on the North West Rail Link got underway with the election of the O'Farrell Government in 2011. As part of the approved proposal, Burns Road Station was replaced with new stops at Lexington Drive, Bella Vista, to the south and Samantha Riley Drive, Kellyville, to the north. The new station opened to passengers 26 May 2019. The station is operated by Metro Trains Sydney, which was also responsible for the design of the station as part of its Operations, Trains and Systems contract with Transport for NSW.

== Services ==
Bella Vista has one island platform with two faces. It is served by Metro North West & Bankstown Line services. Bella Vista station is served by bus route 745 to Glenwood, Stanhope Gardens, Quakers Hill and St Marys, operated by Busways, whilst CDC NSW services to Sydney CBD, North Sydney and Parramatta operate from Celebration T-way.

Platform	Line	Stopping pattern	Notes
1	M1 Metro North West & Bankstown Line	Services to Bankstown	
2	M1 Metro North West & Bankstown Line	Services to Tallawong	

External image
- Bella Vista Bus Guide by Transport for NSW
