= Kellyville metro station =

Sydney Metro railway station

Kellyville
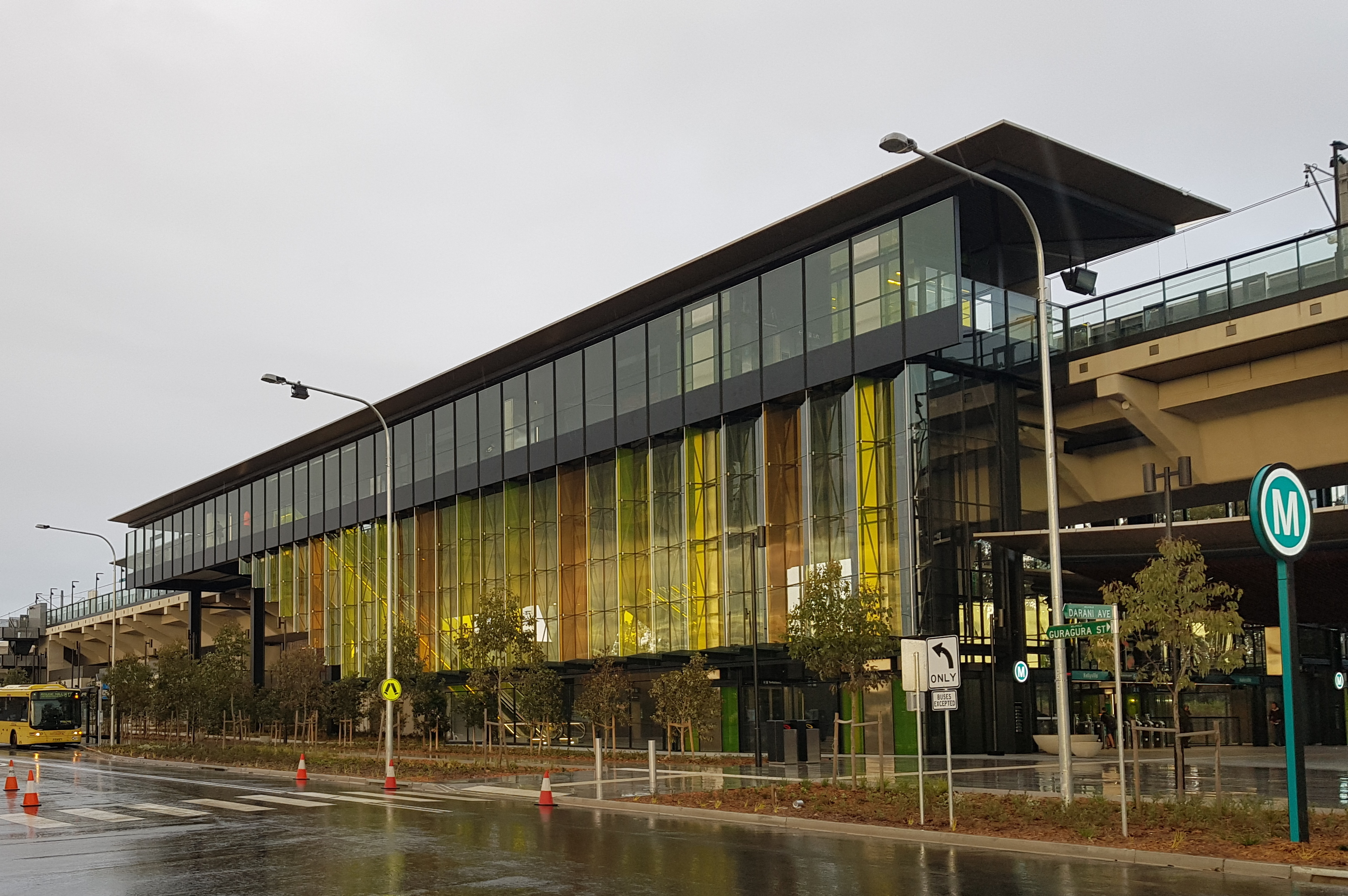
- Guragura Street entrance, June 2019

General information
- Location: Samantha Riley Drive, Kellyville; New South Wales; Australia
- Coordinates: 33°42′49″S 150°56′08″E
- Elevation: 13 m (43 ft) above ground level
- Owner: New South Wales Government via Transport Asset Manager of New South Wales
- Operator: Metro Trains Sydney
- Distance: 30km from Chatswood
- Platforms: 2
- Connections: Bus

Construction
- Structure type: Elevated
- Parking: 1,200 spaces
- Cycle facilities: 45 spaces
- Accessible: Yes

History
- Opened: 26 May 2019

Passengers
- 2023: 1,789,100 (year); 4,902 (daily) (Sydney Metro)

Services
Preceding station	Sydney Metro	Following station
Rouse Hill towards Tallawong	M1 Metro North West & Bankstown Line	Bella Vista towards Bankstown
Location

Kellyville metro station is an elevated station on the Metro North West & Bankstown Line, as part of the Sydney Metro network. The station was built by Impregilo-Salini and Metro Trains Sydney for Transport for NSW, and is situated along Samantha Riley Drive, Kellyville, New South Wales, Australia. Train services from the station run to Tallawong and Bankstown, with a journey time to Chatswood of around 33 minutes, to Sydenham in around 56 minutes, and to Bankstown in around 75 minutes.

== History ==
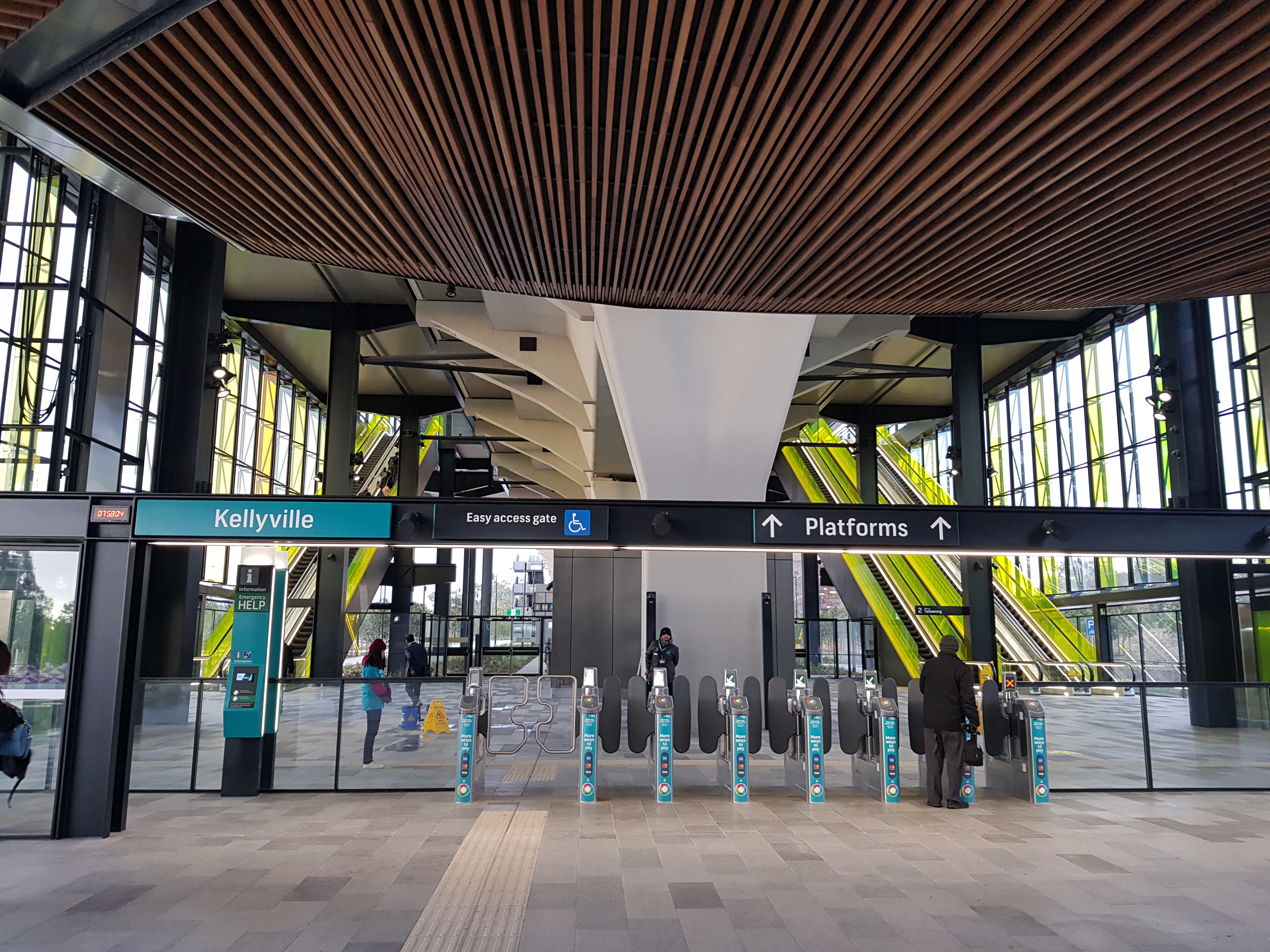
Ticket barriers and concourse

Kellyville, on Sydney's rural fringes, was not considered suitable for new suburban development until 1988, when then Planning Minister Bob Carr abandoned the state's long-standing policy of concentrating new development along existing rail corridors. Instead, the government green-lit development in the area on the proviso that a corridor be preserved for mass transit to be built in future. This corridor, which runs beside Old Windsor Road, was announced as the alignment for the North West T-way, a new bus rapid transit line 10 years later and construction began in 2004. Kellyville's three T-way stations – known as Riley, Burns and Balmoral – opened in March 2007, providing commuters with fast bus access from Kellyville to the Parramatta CBD. Commuters travelling to the Sydney CBD, however, needed to catch buses along the M2 Hills Motorway and congested Sydney Harbour Bridge.

The Government's 1998 plan also envisaged a future rail line to the Hills District, but only as far as Castle Hill. Following dire warnings from the state's most senior rail bureaucrat about a looming capacity crunch on the rail system, a new "North West Rail Link" (NWRL) was proposed in 2005, featuring a station for Kellyville at the corner of Old Windsor and Burns roads – the site of the Burns T-way station, then under construction. A Burns Road Station remained government policy even when the NWRL was dumped in favour of the North West Metro proposal in 2008. The 2009 version of plan featured two stations, one at Burns Road, called Kellyville, and a second at Samantha Riley Drive.

== Design and construction ==
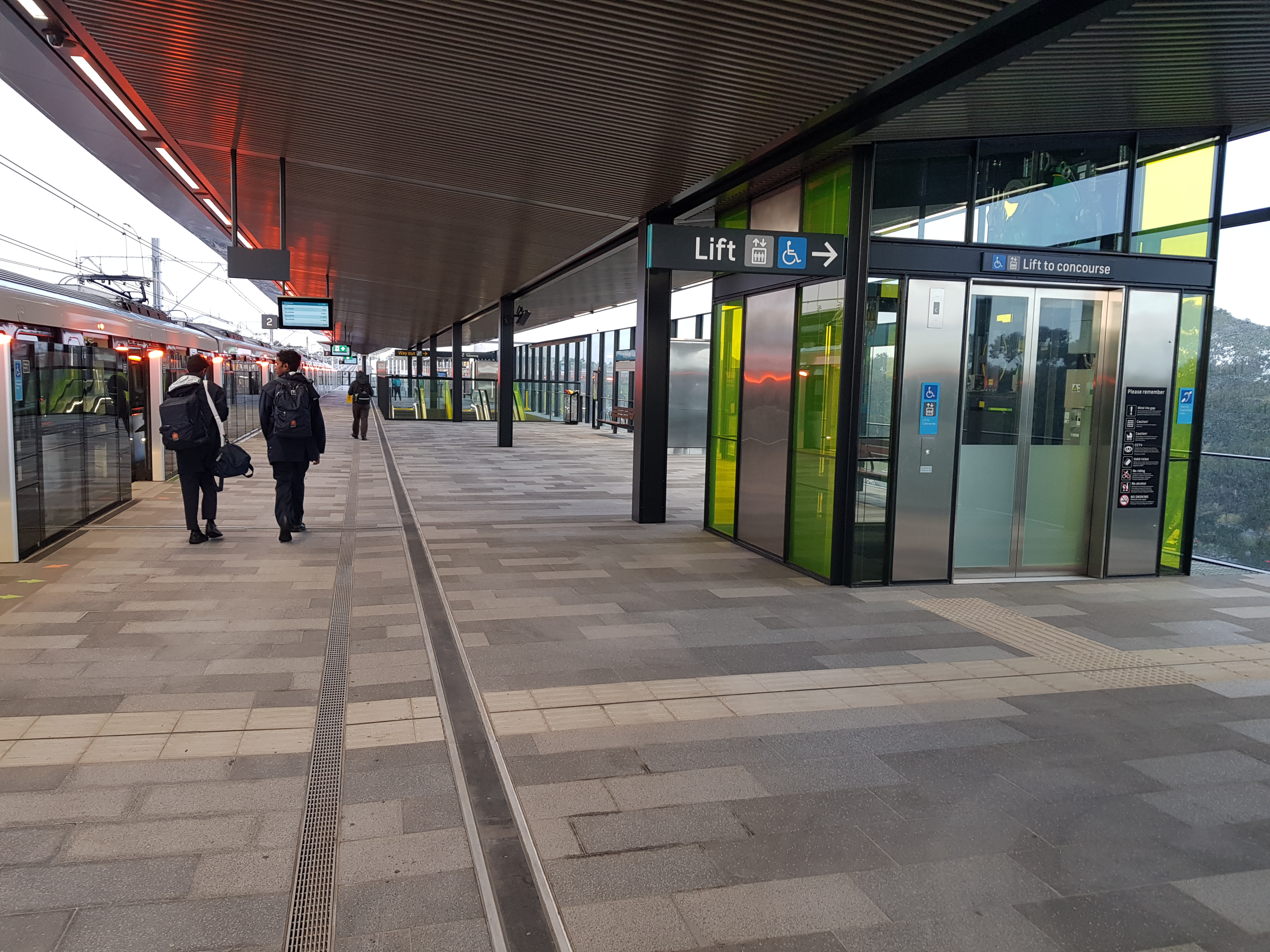
Platforms

The Australian Labor Party was heavily defeated at the 2011 state election in part because of its tendency to announce, cancel and re-announce transport projects. The incoming Liberal/Nationals government, led by Barry O'Farrell, had put a promise to build the NWRL at the centre of their election platform. During consultation and detailed design, it was decided that Burns Road would be replaced with two stations: Bella Vista, on the edge of the giant Norwest Business Park, and Kellyville. Kellyville Station would be built on a new railway viaduct (dubbed the "skytrain") above the existing Riley T-way station.

As part of the project's public–private partnership delivery model, a consortium was chosen to operate the stations and trains. To ensure that the stations were designed to be maintainable and with customer service in mind, the operator would also be responsible for designing and building the station buildings. (An Italian joint venture, Impregilo-Salini, was chosen to build the viaduct as part of a separate $340 million contract.) The Metro Trains Sydney consortium, includes MTR Corporation, which designed, built and operates the stations on the Mass Transit Railway in Hong Kong.

Work on the new station began in June 2014. The NWRL was rebranded Sydney Metro Northwest the following year.

== Services ==
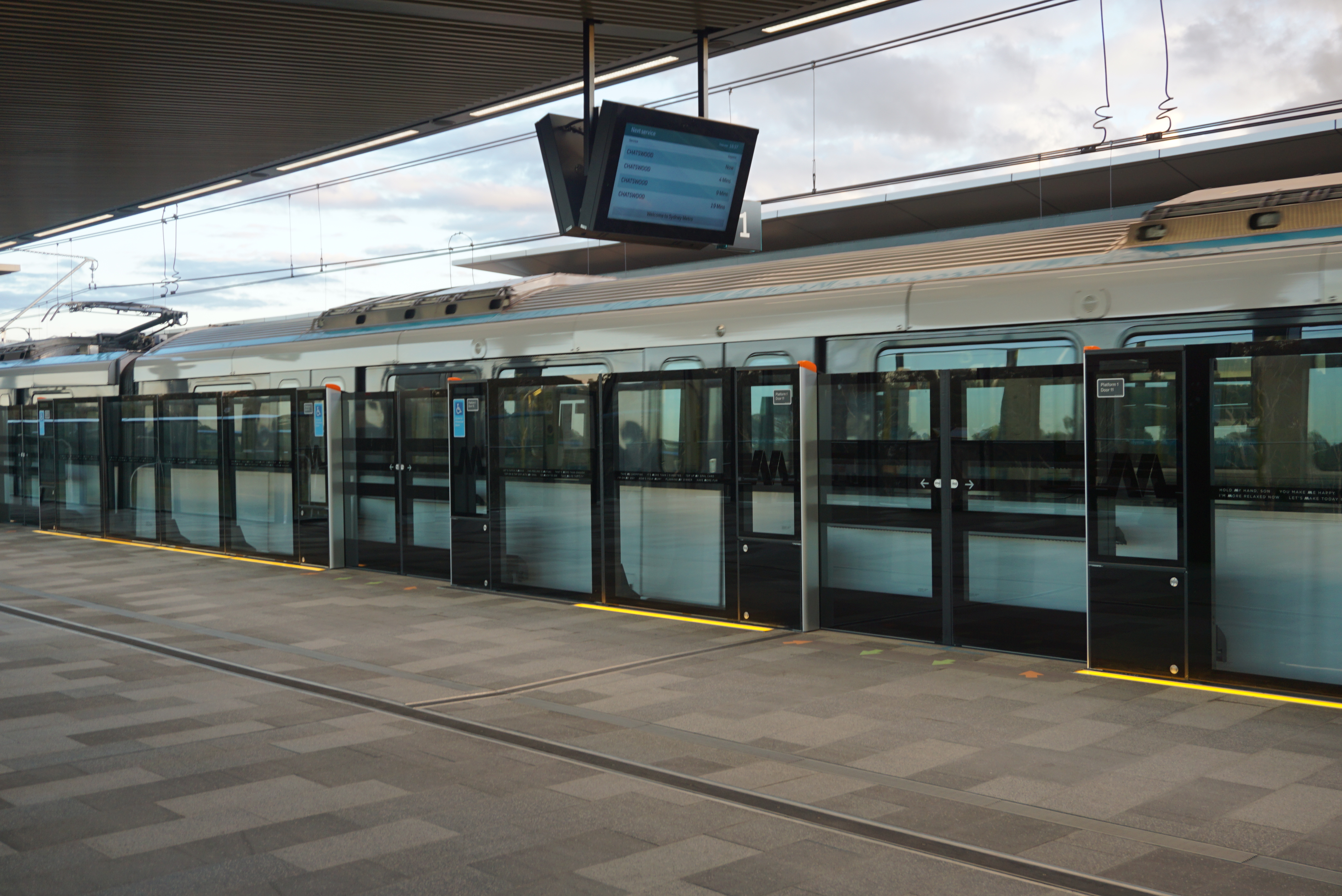
A Chatswood bound service on platform 1

Kellyville has two side platforms. It is served by Metro North West & Bankstown Line services. Kellyville station is served by a number of bus routes operated by Busways and CDC NSW.

Platform	Line	Stopping pattern	Notes
1	M1 Metro North West & Bankstown Line	Services to Bankstown	
2	M1 Metro North West & Bankstown Line	Services to Tallawong	

External image
- Kellyville Bus Guide by Transport for NSW
