= Cherrybrook metro station =

Sydney Metro station

Cherrybrook
- Cherrybrook Station in September 2026

General information
- Location: Castle Hill Road, Cherrybrook; New South Wales; Australia
- Coordinates: 33°44′11″S 151°01′54″E
- Elevation: 7 m (23 ft) below ground level
- Owner: New South Wales Government via Transport Asset Manager of New South Wales
- Operator: Metro Trains Sydney
- Distance: 19 kilometres (12 mi) from Chatswood
- Platforms: 2
- Train operators: Metro Trains Sydney
- Connections: Bus

Construction
- Structure type: Open cut
- Parking: 400 bays
- Cycle facilities: 40 bays
- Accessible: Yes

History
- Opened: 26 May 2019

Passengers
- 2023: 1,820,460 (year); 4,988 (daily) (Sydney Metro)

Services
Preceding station	Sydney Metro	Following station
Castle Hill towards Tallawong	M1 Metro North West & Bankstown Line	Epping towards Bankstown
Location

Cherrybrook metro station is a station on the Sydney Metro network's North West & Bankstown Line, located along Castle Hill Road in the Hornsby Shire suburb of Cherrybrook, New South Wales. The station has since started serving trains to Bankstown .

== History ==
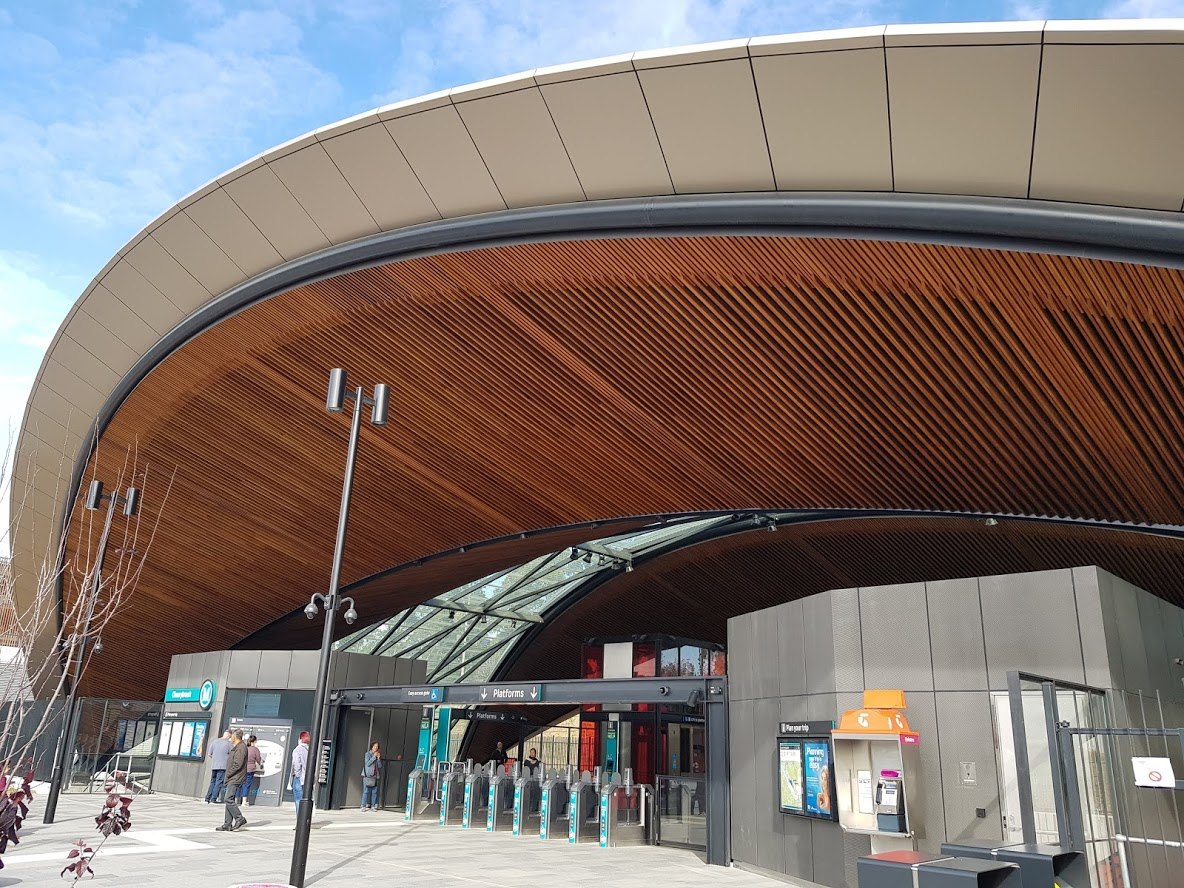
Bradfield Parade entrance

The NSW Government announced a future railway line through the Cherrybrook area, from Epping to Castle Hill, as part of its Action for Public Transport strategy in 1998. (The document did not specifically list any intermediate stations, however.) A more specific but longer-term plan, presented by Co-

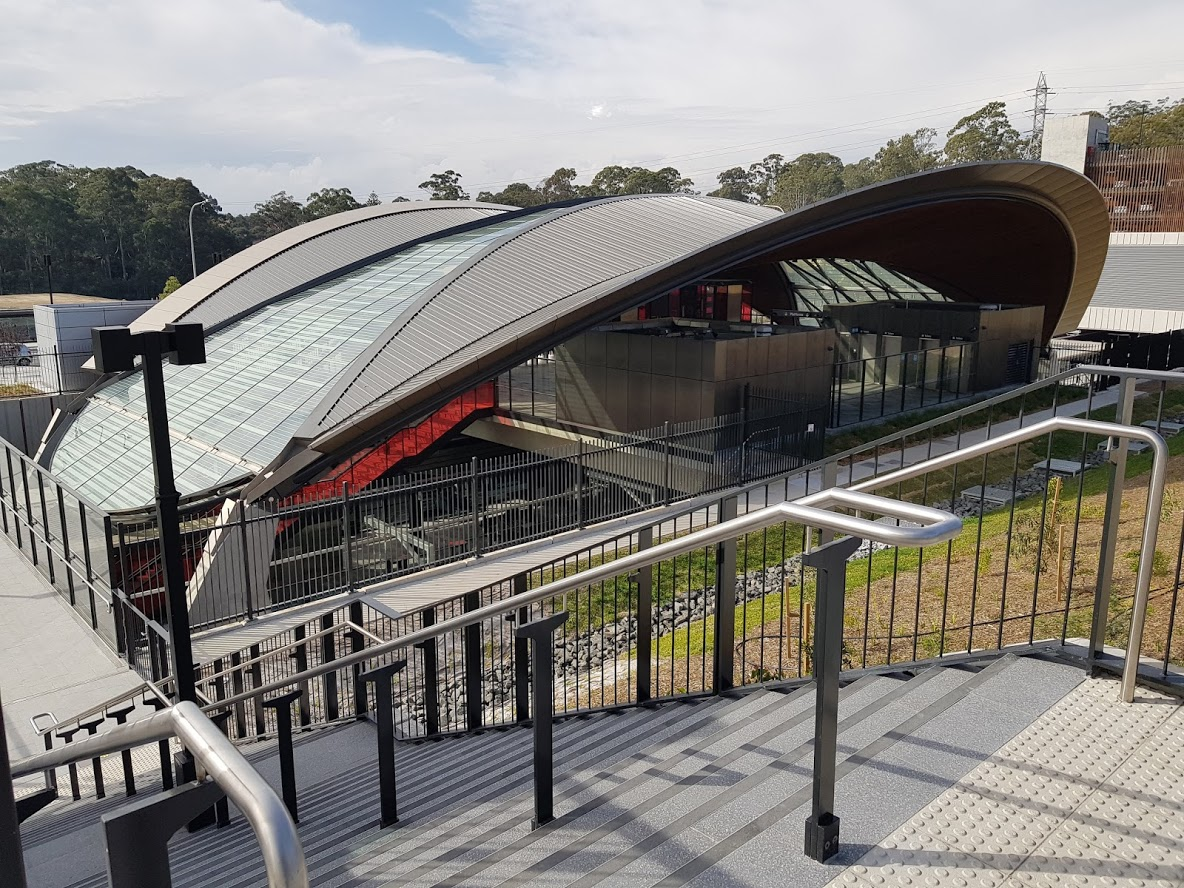
Station building and entrance from Castle Hill Road, June 2019

ordinator General of Rail Ron Christie three years later, listed possible stations at Koala Park, West Pennant Hills, and Highs Road, also in West Pennant Hills.

In 2002, Transport Minister Carl Scully announced that the notional Koala Park and Highs Road sites would be served by a single station at Franklin Road, Cherrybrook, to be called Franklin Road. This site faces Castle Hill Road, like its predecessors, and is roughly halfway between the two. Franklin Road Station remained part of successive north-western rail proposals, including the Metropolitan Rail Expansion Strategy in 2005 and a short-lived metro proposal in 2008.

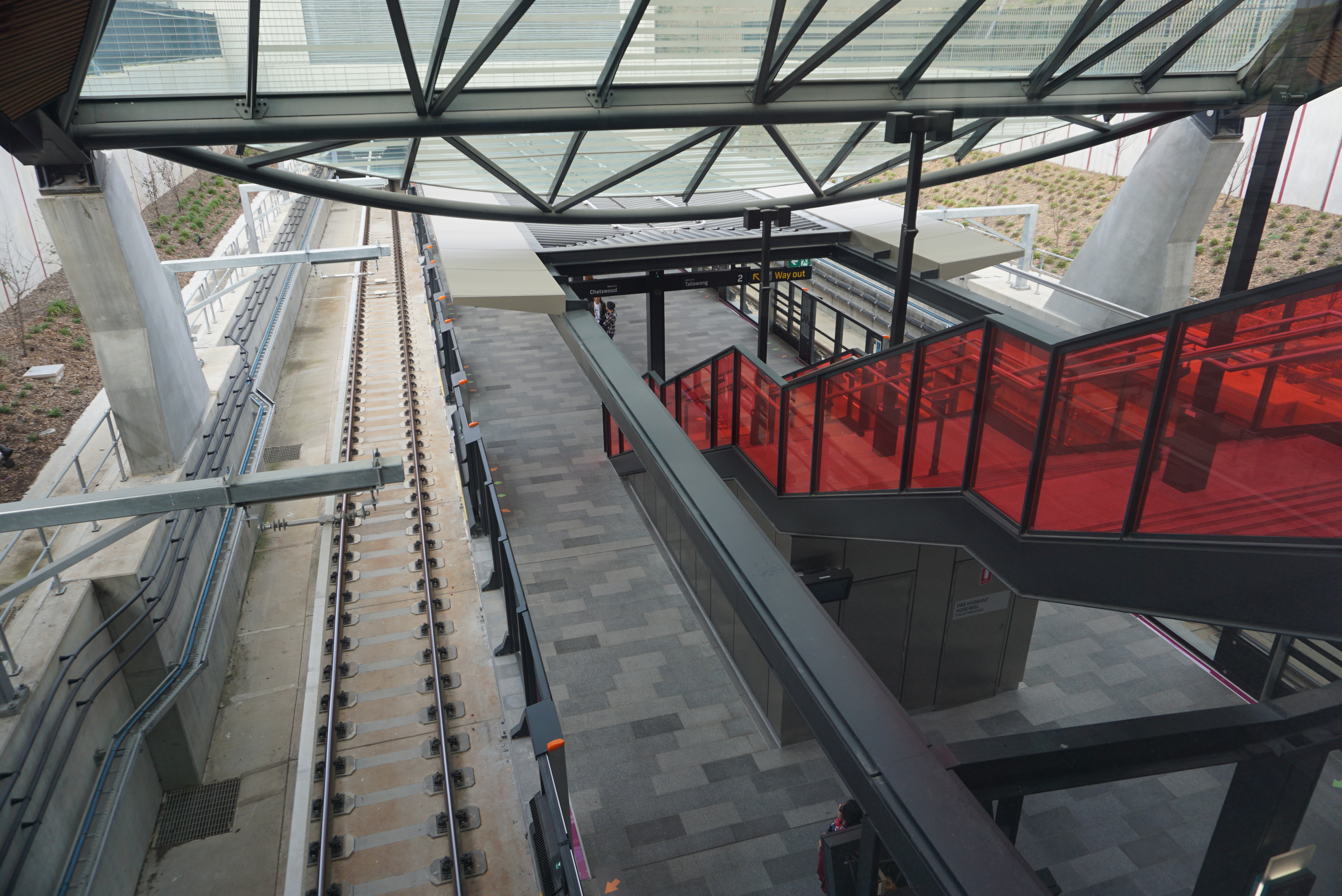
Platforms

Following a change of government, work on the Sydney Metro Northwest commenced in 2013. The station was renamed Cherrybrook Station (Government Land) in the final proposal. The new station opened 26 May 2019. The station is operated by Metro Trains Sydney, which was also responsible for the design of the station as part of its Operations, Trains and Systems contract with Transport for NSW.

== Services ==
Cherrybrook has one island platform with two faces. It is served by Metro North West & Bankstown Line services. Cherrybrook station is served by a number of bus routes operated by CDC NSW.

Platform	Line	Stopping pattern	Notes
1	M1 Metro North West & Bankstown Line	Services to Bankstown	
2	M1 Metro North West & Bankstown Line	Services to Tallawong	
