= Norwest metro station =

Sydney Metro railway station

Norwest
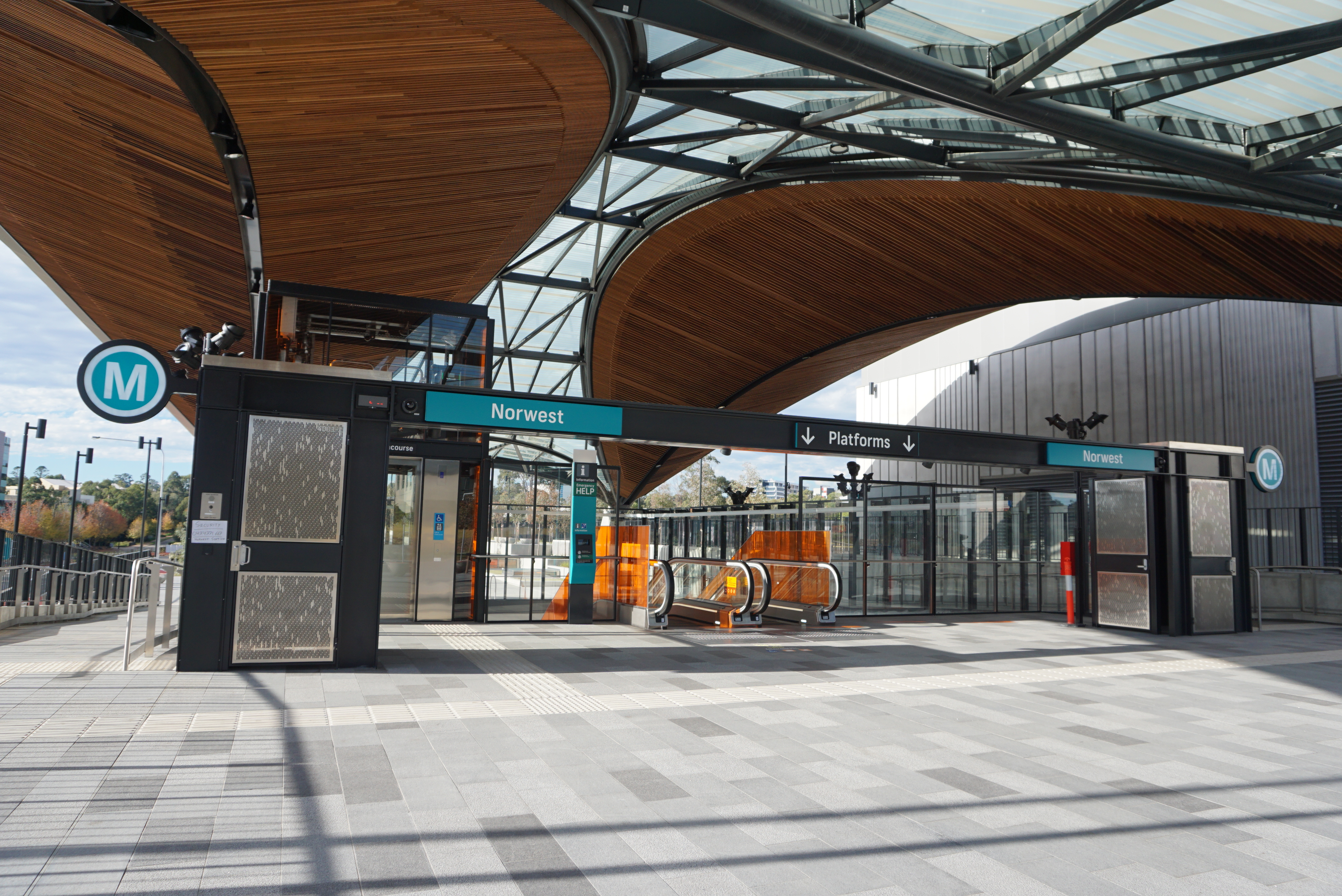
- Main entrance from Brookhollow Avenue, June 2019

General information
- Location: Brookhollow Avenue, Norwest; New South Wales; Australia
- Coordinates: 33°44′03″S 150°57′50″E
- Elevation: 22 m (72 ft) below ground level
- Owner: New South Wales Government via Transport Asset Manager of New South Wales
- Operator: Metro Trains Sydney
- Distance: 26km from Chatswood
- Platforms: 2
- Train operators: Metro Trains Sydney
- Connections: Bus

Construction
- Structure type: Underground
- Cycle facilities: 30 spaces
- Accessible: Yes

History
- Opened: 26 May 2019

Passengers
- 2023: 1,213,300 (year); 3,324 (daily) (Sydney Metro)

Services
Preceding station	Sydney Metro	Following station
Bella Vista towards Tallawong	M1 Metro North West & Bankstown Line	Hills Showground towards Bankstown
Location

Norwest metro station is an underground Sydney Metro station on Brookhollow Avenue in Norwest, New South Wales, Australia. The station serves the Metro North West & Bankstown Line and was built as part of the Sydney Metro Northwest project. The station opened in 2019 with initial services to Chatswood, with services extended to Sydenham in 2024 and to Bankstown in 2026.

== History ==
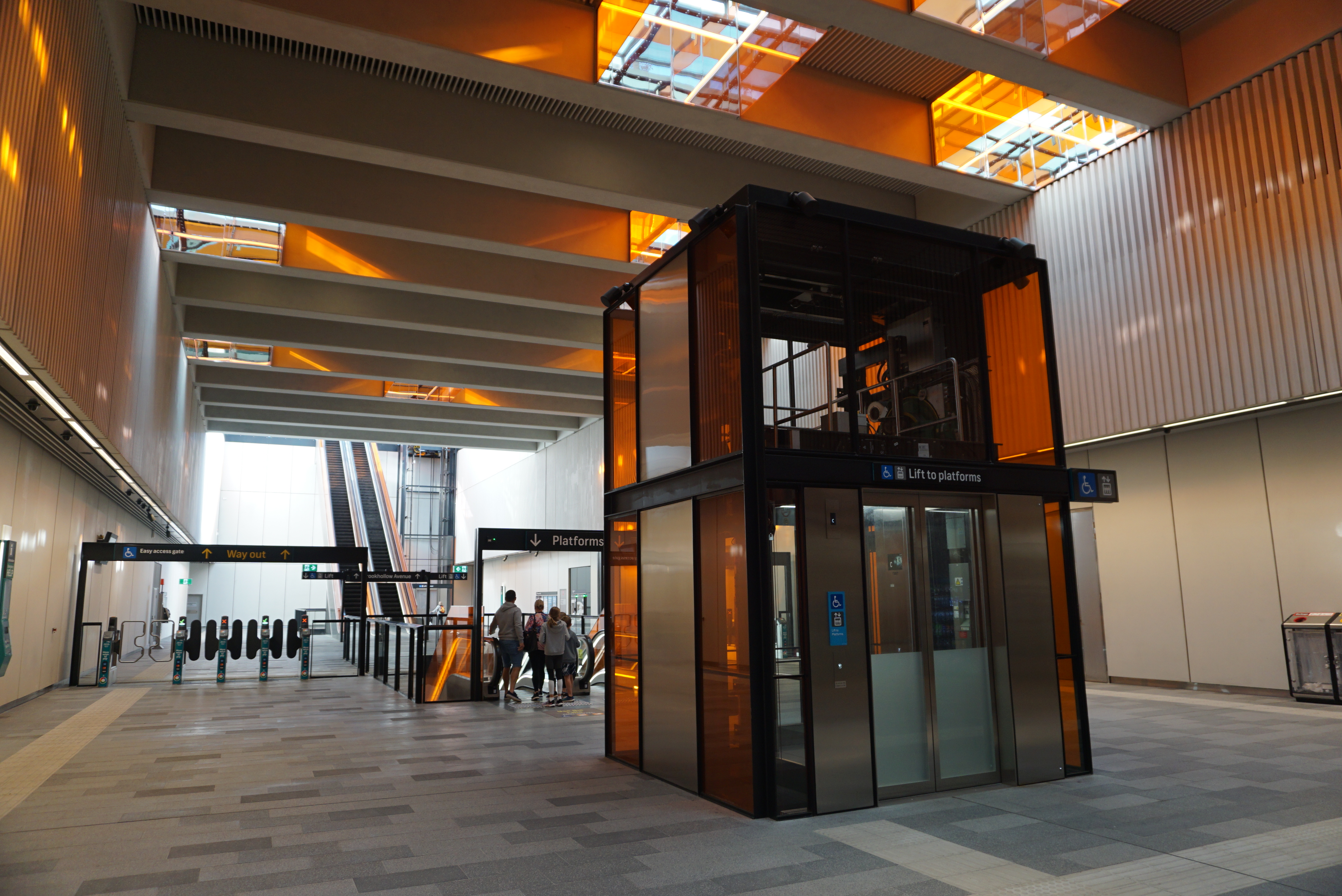
Concourse

The NSW Government announced a future railway line to Castle Hill as part of its Action for Public Transport strategy in 1998. A more specific but longer-term plan presented by Co-ordinator General of Rail Ron Christie three years later included a 'Mungerie Park Line', with a station at Norwest Business Park. In the years that followed, Norwest Station formed part of successive north-western rail proposals, including the Metropolitan Rail Expansion Plan in 2005 and a short-lived metro proposal in 2008.

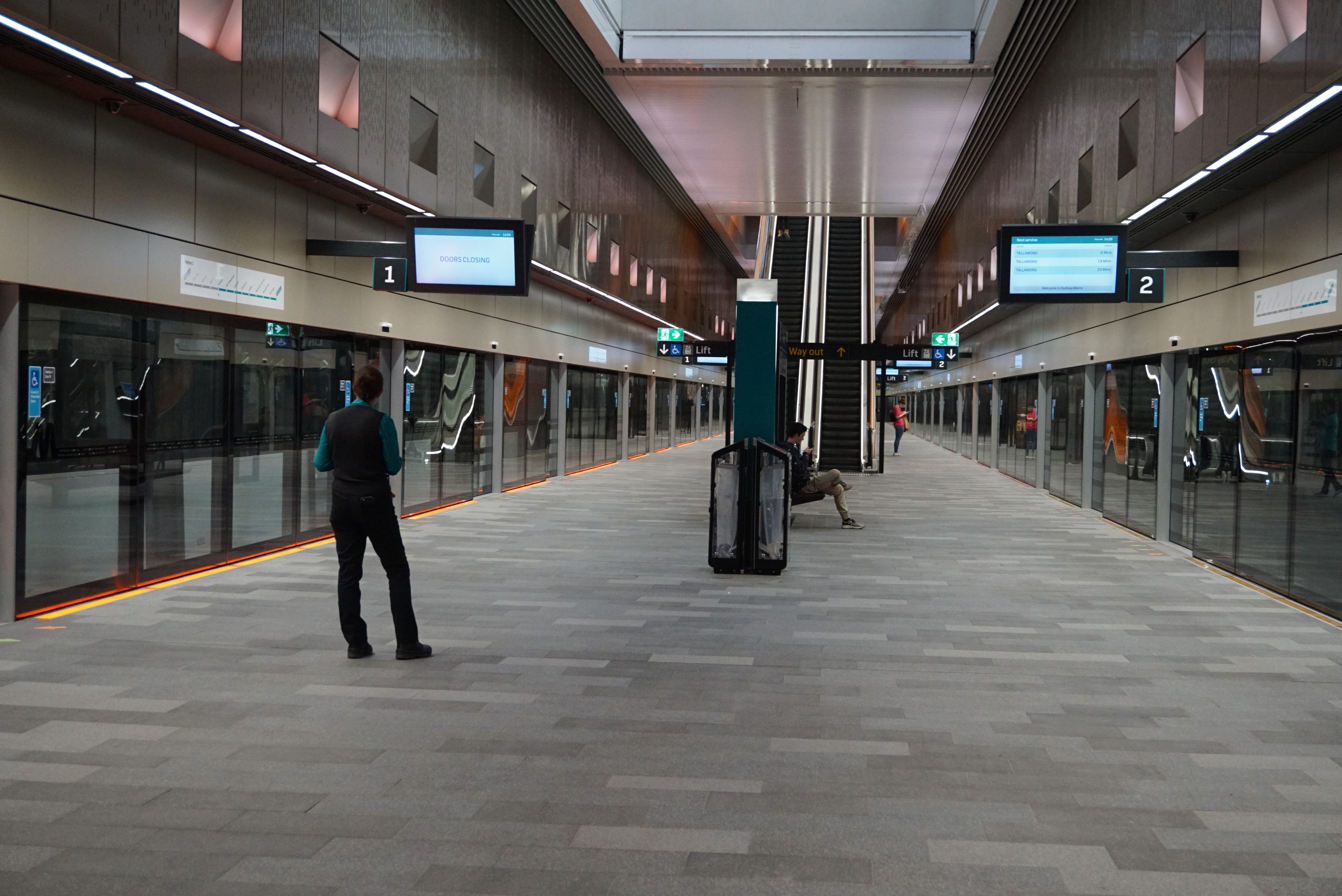
Platforms

Following a change of government, work on the North West Rail Link commenced in 2013. As part of the approved proposal, an additional station, Bella Vista, was added within the business park. The new station opened on 26 May 2019. The station is operated by Metro Trains Sydney, which was also responsible for the design of the station as part of its Operations, Trains and Systems contract with Transport for NSW.

== Services ==
Norwest has two platforms. It is served by Metro North West & Bankstown Line services. Norwest station is served by a number of bus routes operated by Busways and CDC NSW.

Platform	Line	Stopping pattern	Notes
1	M1 Metro North West & Bankstown Line	Services to Bankstown	
2	M1 Metro North West & Bankstown Line	Services to Tallawong	

External image
- Norwest Bus Guide by Transport for NSW
