= Sydney Metro Northwest =

Rapid transit rail project in Sydney, New South Wales, Australia

- Map of the Sydney Metro M1's construction segments

Overview
- Status: Complete
- Locale: Sydney, Australia
- Stations: 13 (8 new stations, 5 stations converted)

Service
- Type: Rapid transit line
- System: Sydney Metro
- Rolling stock: Metropolis Stock

History
- Opened: 26 May 2019; 7 years ago
- Announced: 2011
- Start of major construction: 18 June 2014
- Completion: May 2019

Technical
- Line length: 36 km (22 mi)
- Num of tracks: 2
- Track gauge: 1,435 mm (4 ft 8 1/2 in) standard gauge
- Electrification: 1,500 V DC from overhead catenary
- Signalling: Alstom Urbalis 400 moving block CBTC ATC under ATO GoA 4 (UTO), with subsystems of ATP, Iconis ATS and Smartlock CBI
Route map
All Metro stations
have wheelchair access

Sydney Metro Northwest was a rapid transit project that constructed the first section of the M1 Metro North West & Bankstown Line through the north-western suburbs of Sydney, New South Wales, Australia. The project included the conversion of the existing Epping to Chatswood rail link to metro standards and connects the suburbs of Rouse Hill and Chatswood via Castle Hill and Epping. The project was managed by Transport for NSW. The line is part of the Sydney Metro system. The completed Metro North West line opened on 26 May 2019, and was later extended to Sydenham via the CBD, which opened on 19 August 2024, and was further extended to Bankstown on 30 October 2026.

Prior to June 2015, the project was known as the North West Rail Link (NWRL). Originally, "North West Rail Link" referred to the section between Epping and Rouse Hill. By June 2015, the name had been extended to cover the route of the original NWRL and the existing Epping to Chatswood railway line. In June 2015, it was announced that the entire project would be renamed the Sydney Metro Northwest.

== Project history ==
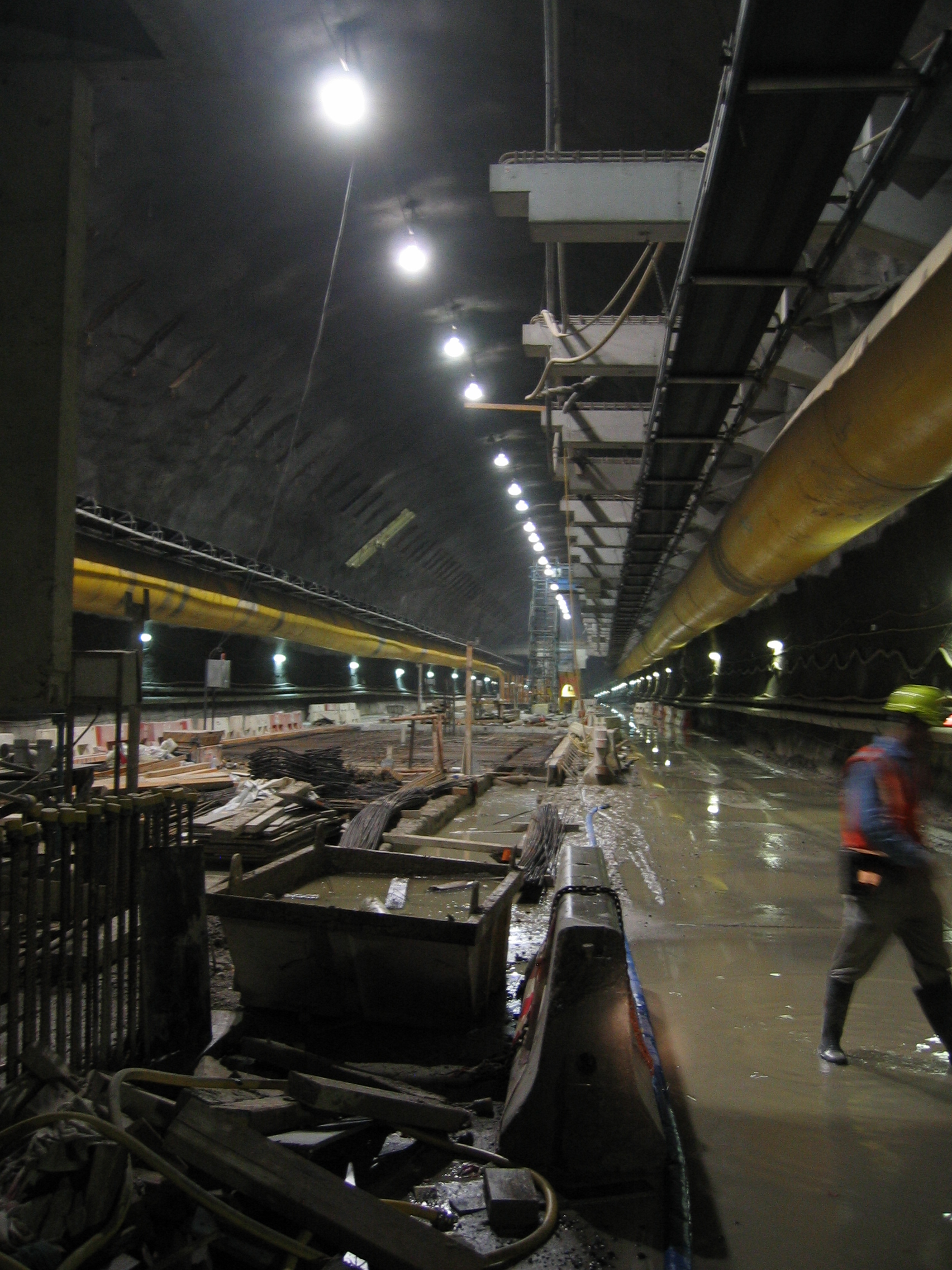
The Epping to Chatswood rail link under construction in February 2005

Planning for the original North West Rail Link which later became known as Sydney Metro Northwest was a long and complex affair. The line was announced, cancelled and re-announced several times beginning in the 1990s. There were differing plans as to how the line would integrate into the rest of Sydney's transport system. The following proposals were endorsed at one time or another by the government:

- Main line rail connecting to the Main Northern line near Beecroft, with trains accessing the city via either Rhodes (using the Main Northern line) or Macquarie Park (using the Epping to Chatswood line).
- Main line rail connecting directly to the Epping to Chatswood line at Epping, with trains accessing the city via Macquarie Park.
- Rapid transit line from the north west to the city via the Inner West, dubbed the North West Metro.
- Rapid transit line connecting to a modified Epping to Chatswood line at Epping. Trains terminate at Chatswood, with an extension to the city proposed for the future. This was the design that was ultimately selected.

By May 2015, media releases from Transport for NSW used the name "North West Rail Link" to address the whole section between Rouse Hill and Chatswood and not just the unbuilt part. On 4 June 2015, Premier Mike Baird and Minister for Transport & Infrastructure Andrew Constance announced the rebranding of the Sydney Rapid Transit to the Sydney Metro. In conjunction with the rebranding, the North West Rail Link was renamed Sydney Metro Northwest.

=== Line operation ===
In December 2011, the State Government suggested that they have not ruled out the possibility of contracting the operation, rolling stock and signalling on the North West Rail Link to private operators as part of a public-private partnership.

We are focused on the longer term rail options. It's got to work as a single network, the whole network, but we are looking at private sector involvement in those as well. And we've got an open mind.

— Les Wielinga, Director-General, Transport NSW

In June 2012, it was announced that the line would use single deck "Metro" style trains, rather than the double deck trains more commonly used in Sydney. In May 2013, it was announced that two consortia had been shortlisted to construct the trains and systems, as well as operate the line:

- Northwest Rapid Transit consisting of John Holland, Leighton Contractors, MTR Corporation, Plenary Group and UGL Rail
- TransForm consisting of Bombardier Transportation, John Laing Investments, Macquarie Capital, McConnell Dowell, Serco and SNC-Lavalin Capital

On 24 June 2014, the Northwest Rapid Transit consortium was selected as the preferred operator to deliver the North West Rail Link operations contract.

=== Construction ===
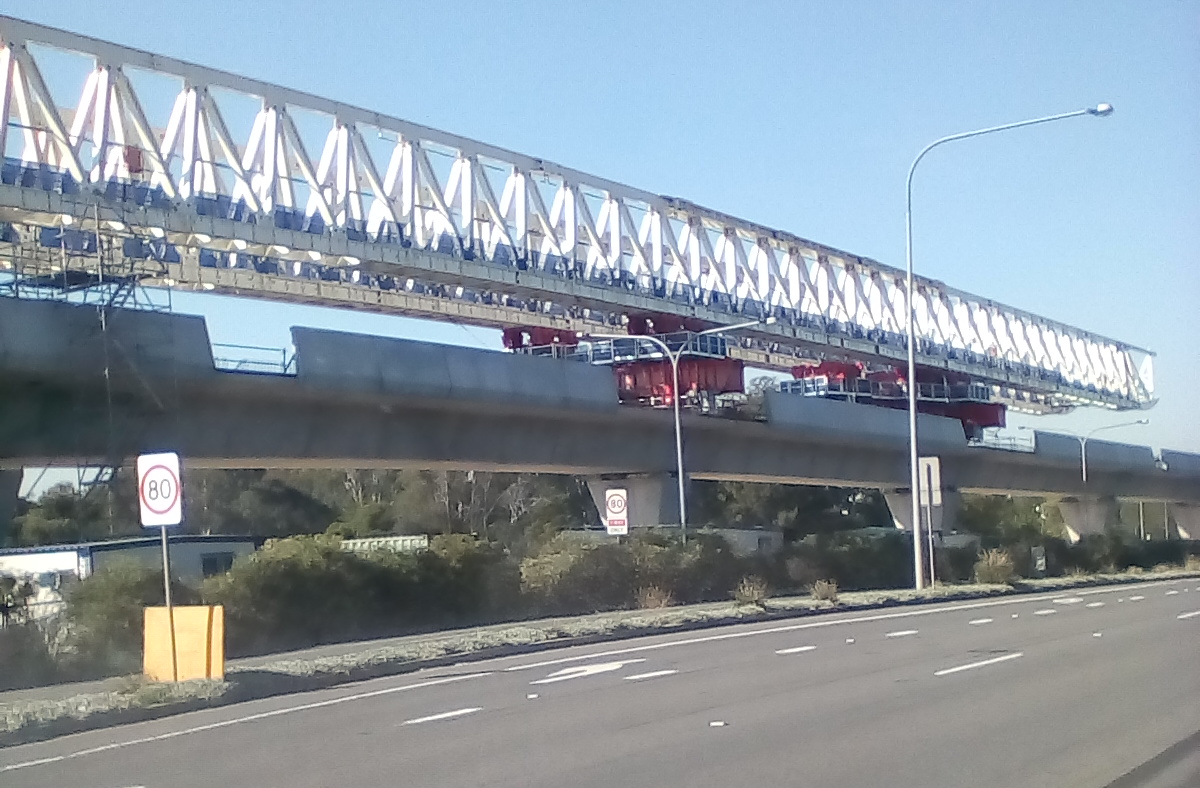
Northwest Metro 'Sky Rail' under construction at Kellyville, 1 May 2017. The white gantry was used to hold the cement segments and lower them into place.

==== Commencement of geotechnical work ====
Coffey Geotechnics supported by AECOM were awarded the tender for geotechnical drilling services in August 2011, and drilling began on 7 September 2011. A drilling rig was set up in a park opposite the Castle Towers shopping centre at Castle Hill, where one of the underground stations will be built. At least 150 boreholes with a diameter of up to 15 centimetres (5.9 in) will be drilled up to 75 metres (246 ft) deep along the proposed alignment between Epping and Rouse Hill in order to develop an understanding of the geological profile. The drilling is anticipated to take about 9 weeks to complete.

Dirt from the tunnelling process was recycled and distributed across Sydney.

==== Major construction contracts awarded ====
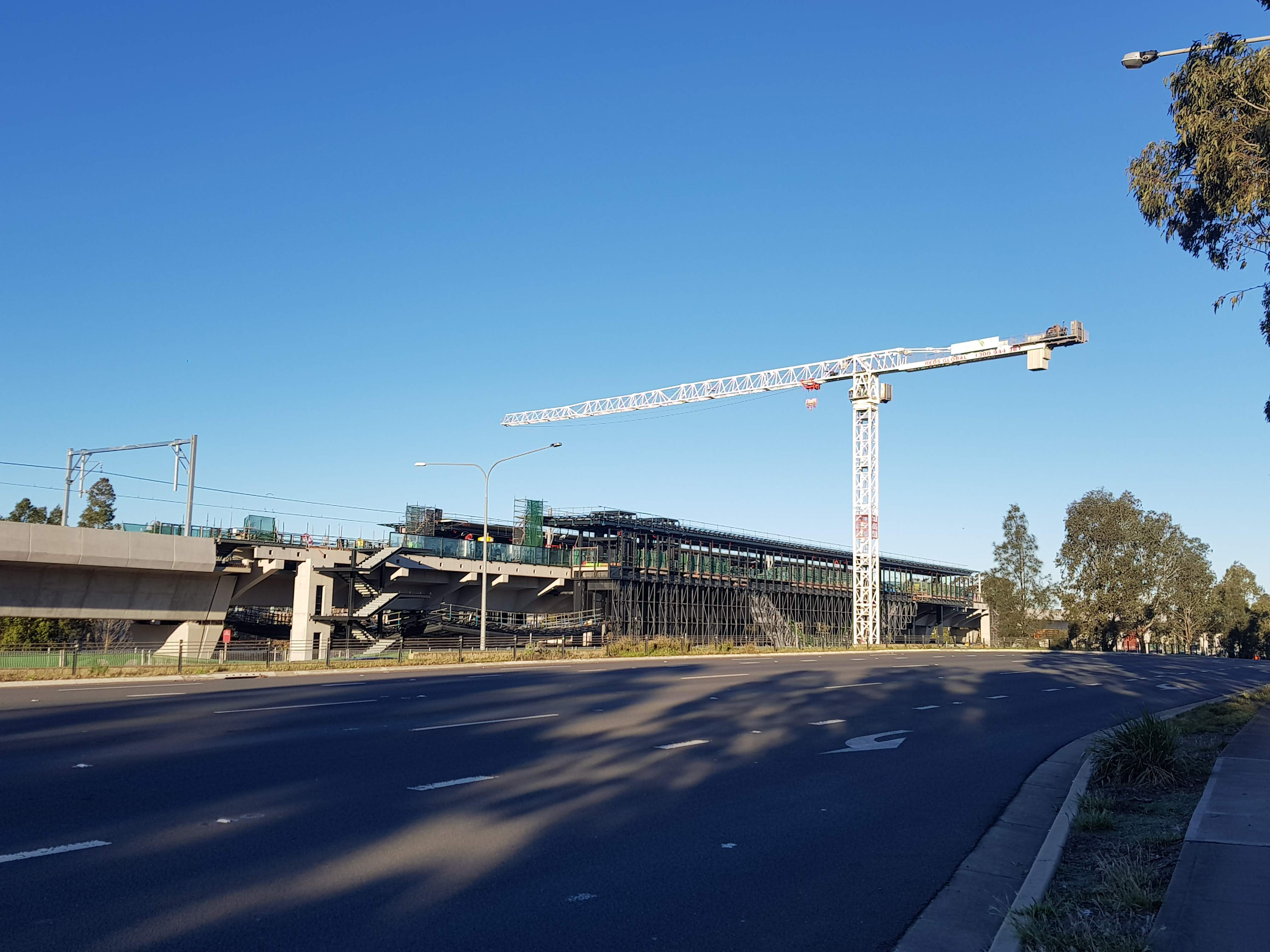
Construction of Rouse Hill station in July 2018, one of several stations along the elevated section of the line

There were three major contracts for the construction of the North West Rail Link. In June 2013, the Tunnels and Station Caverns (TSC) contract was awarded to a joint venture involving Thiess and John Holland, and Dragados. In December 2013, the Surface and Viaduct Civils (SVC) construction contract was awarded to a joint venture between Italian firms Impregilo and Salini. The $340 million contract includes a 270-metre (886 ft) cable-stayed bridge over Windsor Road at Rouse Hill. A third and final major contract - Operations and Train Systems (OTS) - to build the stations and rail systems provide the single deck trains, operate the rail link and maintain the system was announced at the end of 2014, awarded to the Northwest Rapid Transit joint venture between John Holland, Leighton Contractors, MTR Corporation, Plenary Group and UGL Rail. Thiess's civil engineering business was transferred to CPB Contractors in 2016.

=== Conversion of the Epping to Chatswood rail link ===
The Epping to Chatswood railway line opened in 2009 as a heavy rail line, initially as a shuttle service between Chatswood and Epping. The line was later integrated into the Northern Line. During O'Farrell's time as premier, the government announced that the line was to be closed and converted to rapid transit standards.

The Epping to Chatswood rail link closed from 30 September 2018 for around seven months for conversion to rapid transit standards. A temporary bus service known as Station Link operated with over 100 buses to replace the trains until the stations finished upgrading and reopened in May 2019. In addition Sydney Trains introduced new timetables with extra train services on the North Shore Line to and from the Northern and Western lines with the Central to Epping via Strathfield section extended to Hornsby.

=== Initial station site works in August 2015 ===
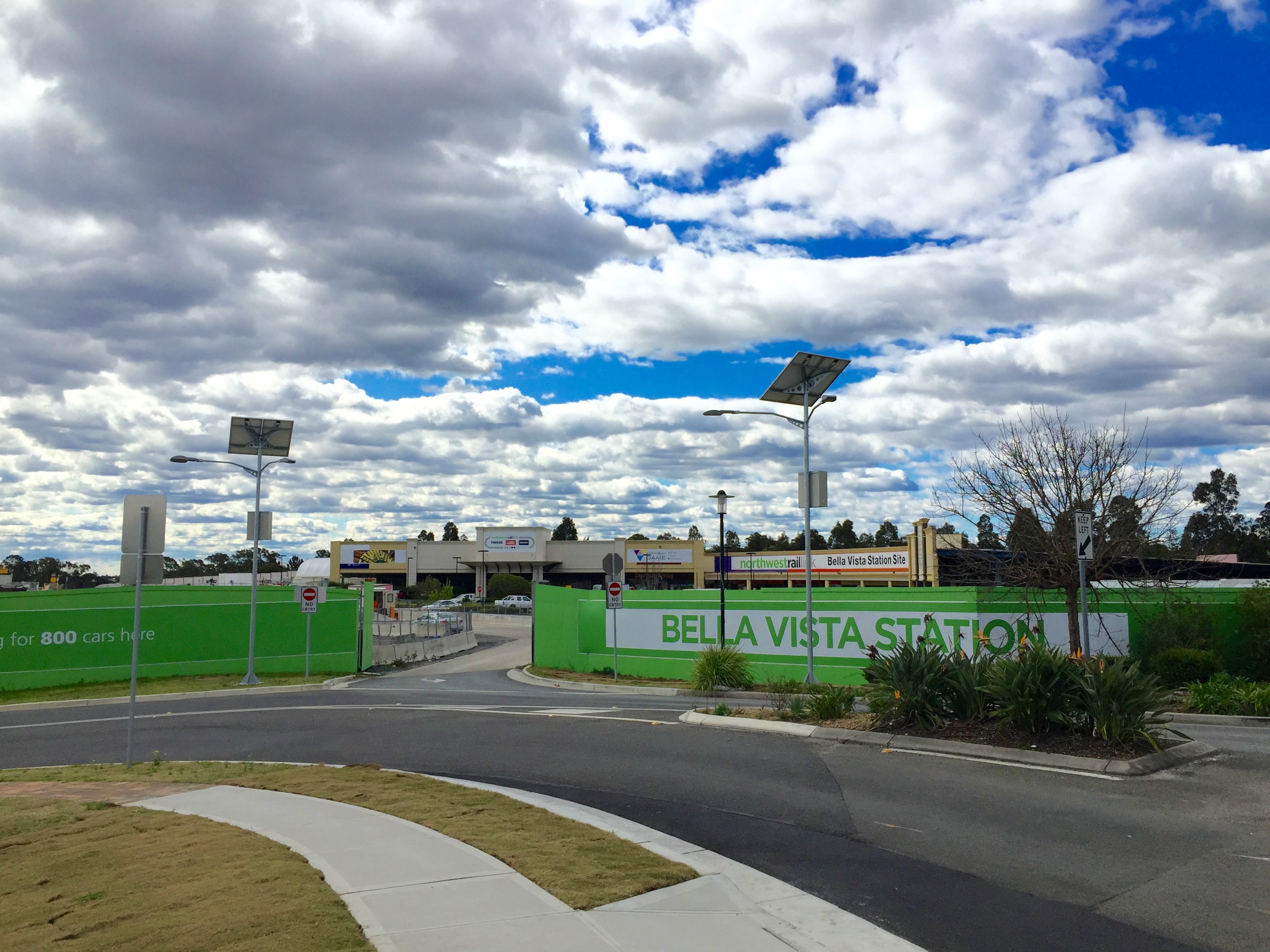
Bella Vista

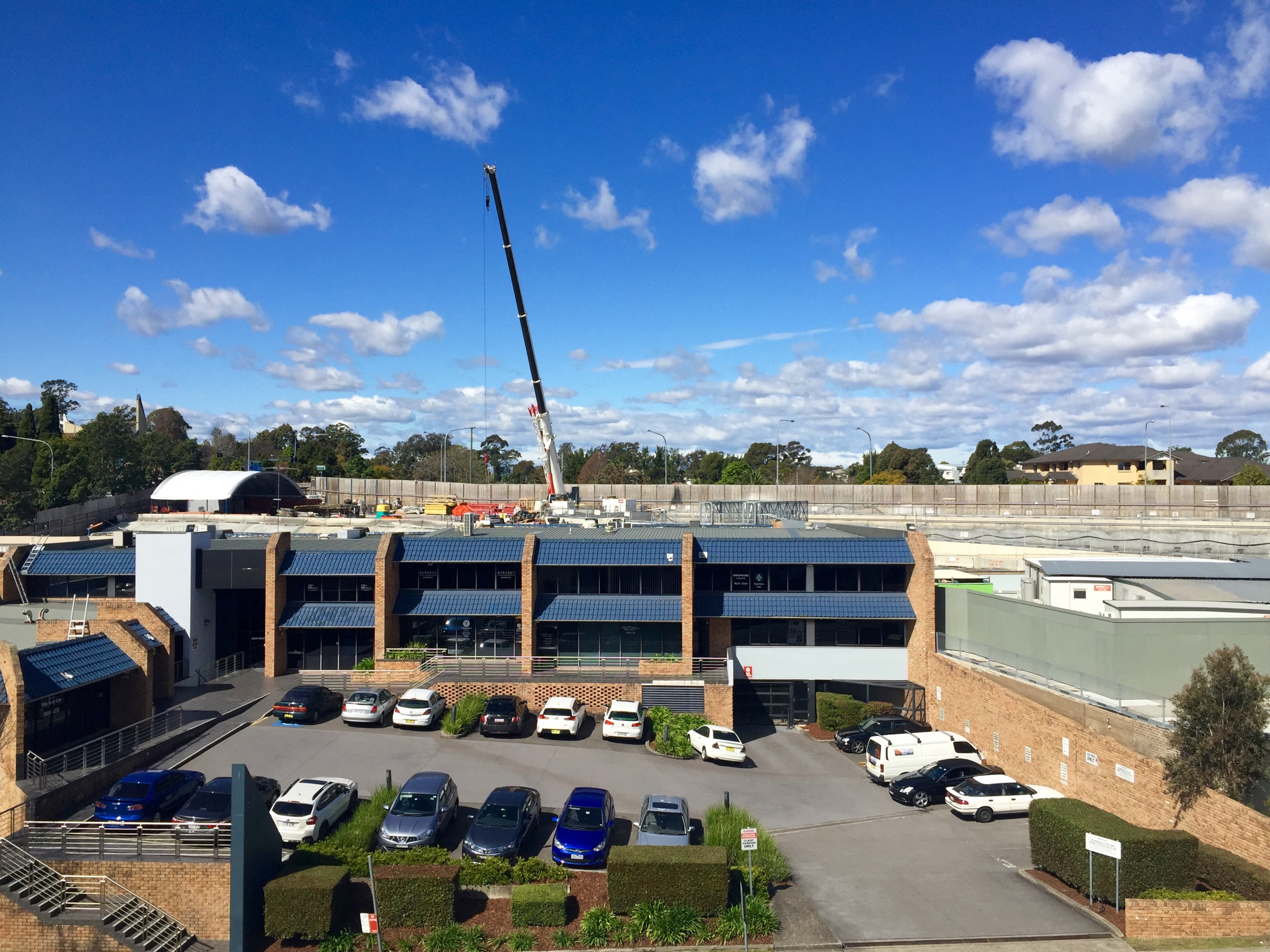
Castle Hill

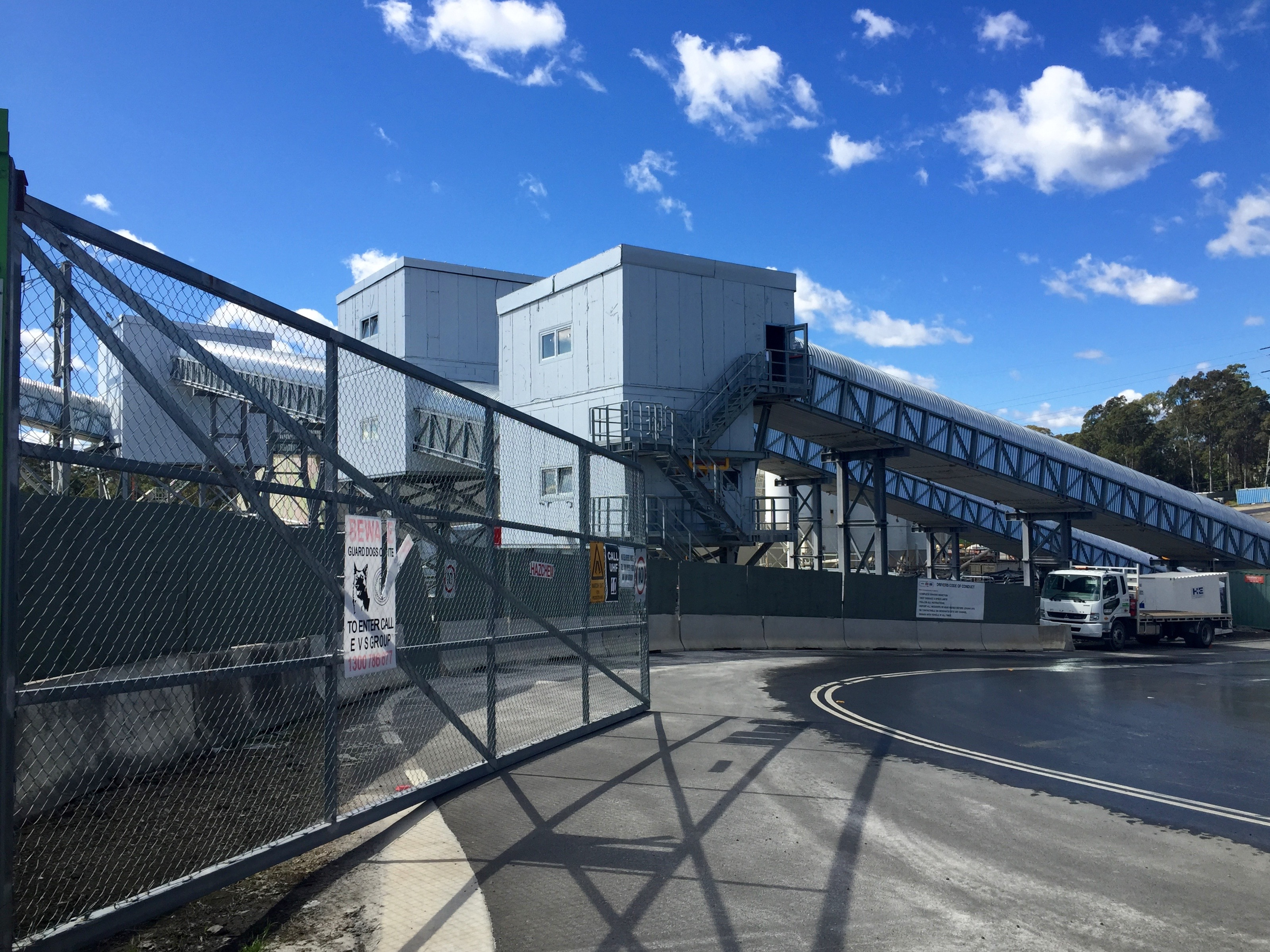
Cherrybrook

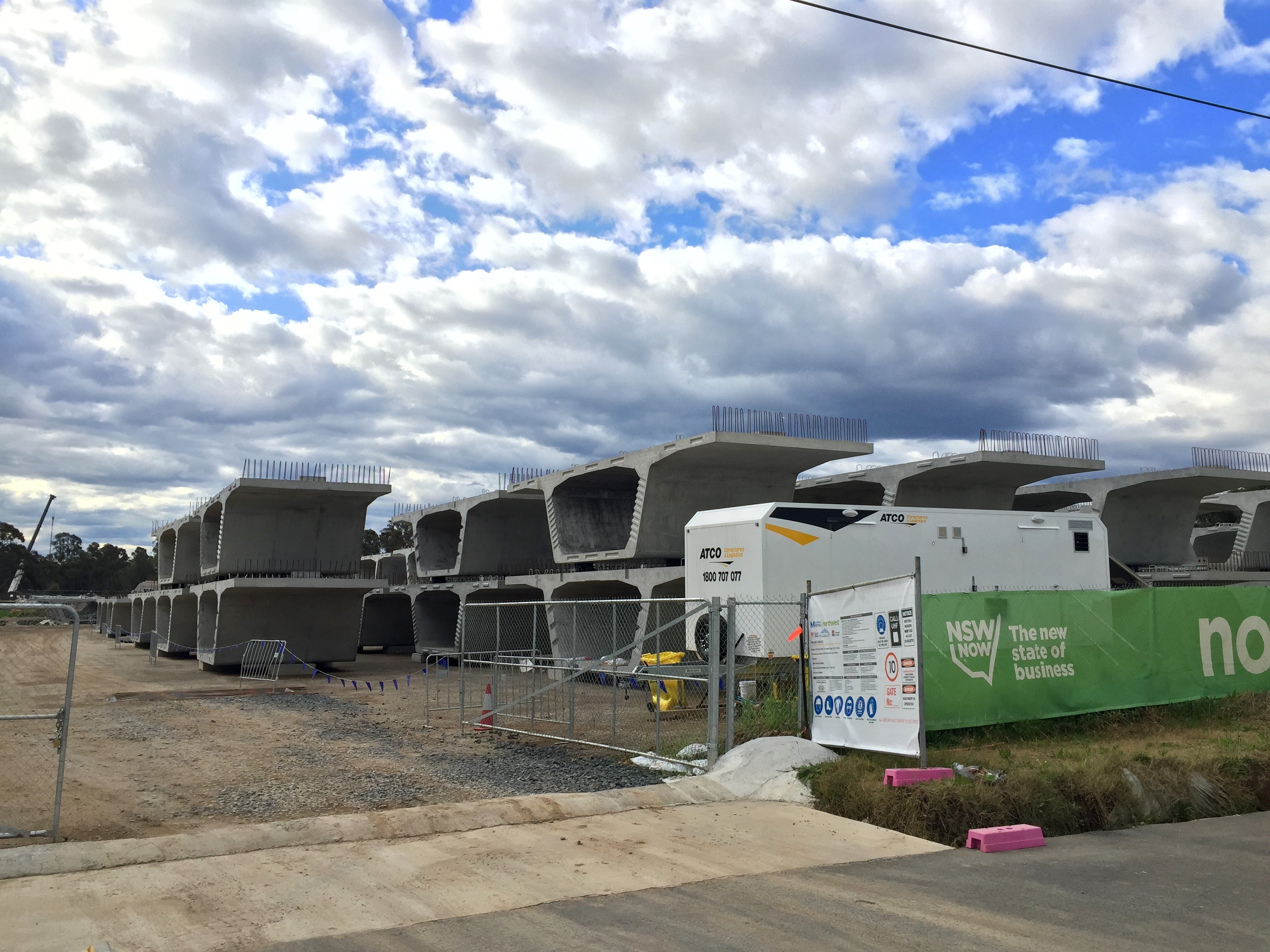
Tallawong

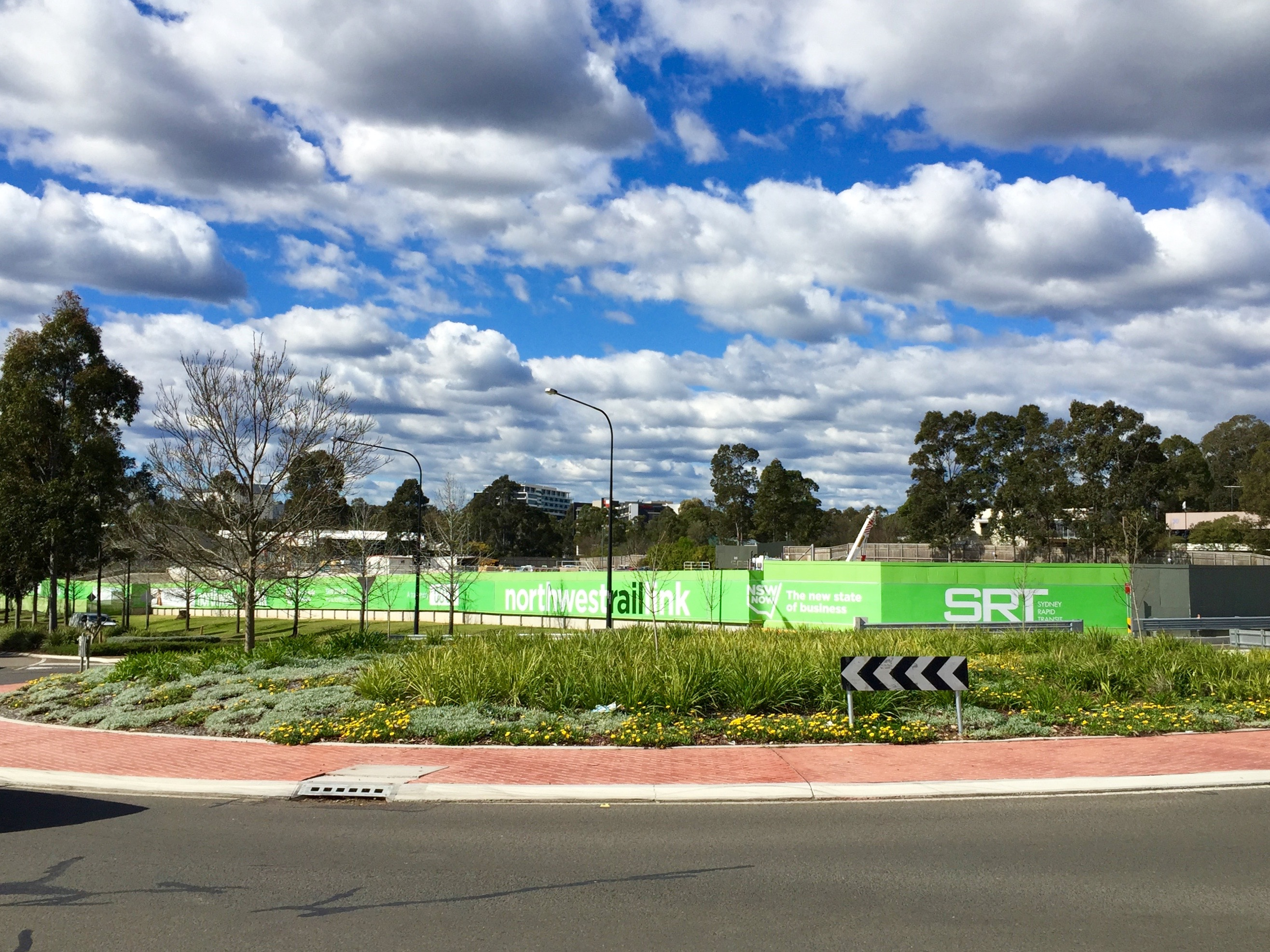
Norwest

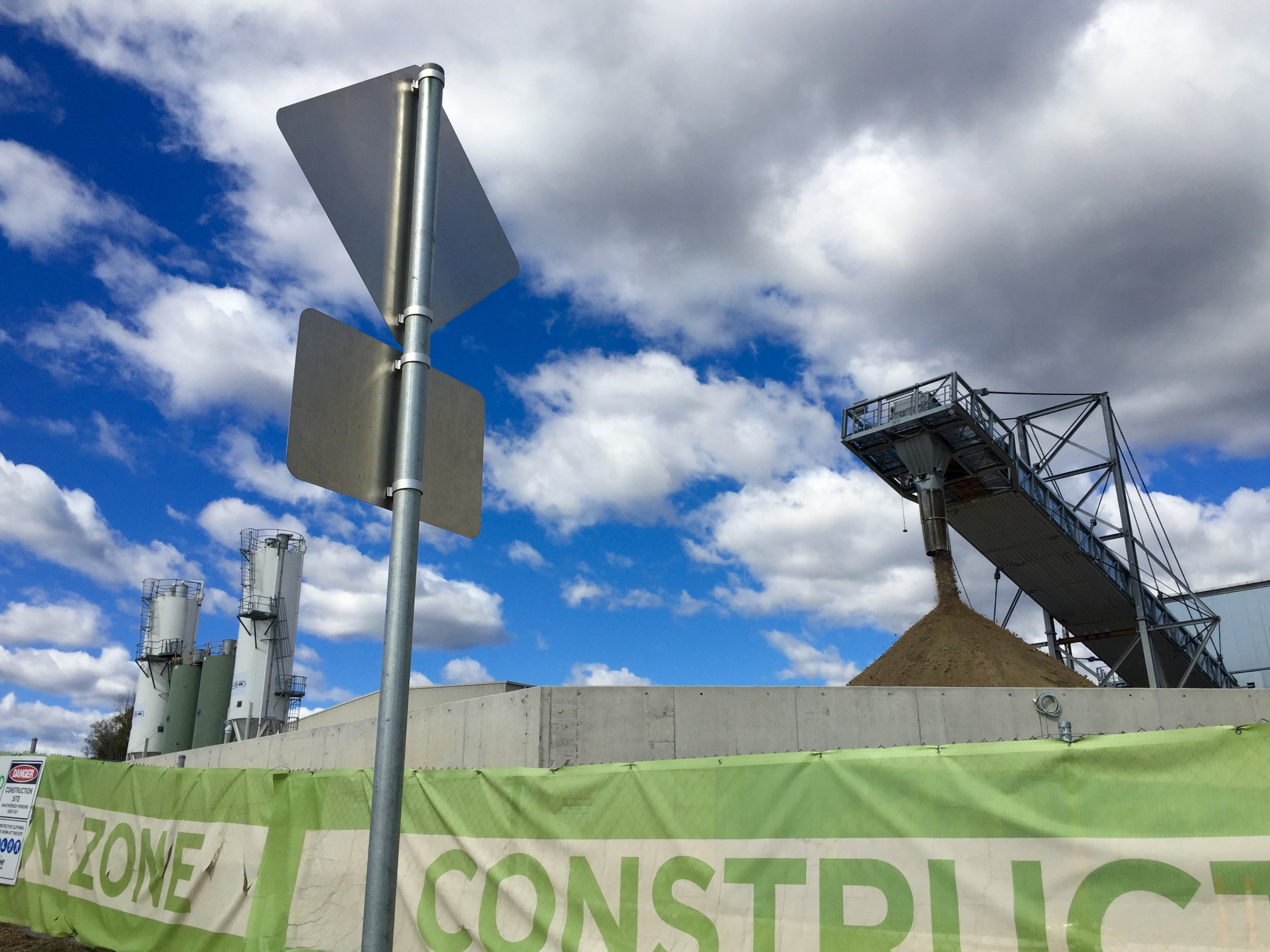
Hills Showground

=== Completion ===
On 14 January 2019, the first driverless Metro train completed the full journey between Tallawong and Chatswood.

The rail link opened for passenger service on 26 May 2019, with the Metro North West Line running along the entire length of the link.

== Route ==
New stations built for the link are as follows:

- Tallawong (known as Cudgegong Road during the planning stages)
- Rouse Hill
- Kellyville
- Bella Vista
- Norwest
- Hills Showground (known as Hills Centre, and originally Showground during the planning stages)
- Castle Hill
- Cherrybrook

The remaining stations were originally built for the Epping to Chatswood rail link and converted to Metro operation:

- Epping — interchange to T9 Northern Line and Central Coast & Newcastle Line
- Macquarie University
- Macquarie Park
- North Ryde
- Chatswood — interchange to T1 North Shore & Western Line, T9 Northern Line and Central Coast & Newcastle line services

Tallawong and Cherrybrook stations were built as stations in a cutting, open to the sky, but below ground level while Castle Hill, Hills Showground and Norwest stations are underground, whereas Kellyville and Rouse Hill are above ground. The twin tunnels between Epping and Kellyville, at 15.5 km (9.6 mi) long, are the longest rail tunnels in Sydney. They are also the deepest tunnels in Sydney: 67 m (220 ft) below ground at the deepest point below the intersection of Pennant Hills Road and Castle Hill Road—deeper than the floor of Sydney Harbour (about 50 m (164 ft)), and much deeper than the deepest point of the City Circle tunnels at St James (about 11 m (36 ft)). Most of the tunnel was bored, although the section at Kellyville was constructed using cut-and-cover techniques. Major tunnelling began in 2014.

=== Extension to Sydney CBD and Bankstown ===
The Sydney Metro City & Southwest project extended the Metro North West Line to the Sydney central business district and on to Bankstown through a tunnel from just south of Chatswood station via North Sydney and under the Sydney Harbour towards Central and Sydenham, before joining the newly converted railway line towards Bankstown. The extension project commenced construction in 2017, with the Chatswood to Sydenham section opening on 19 August 2024 and the Sydenham to Bankstown conversion opening on 30 October 2026.

=== Potential western extensions ===
Previously, there were long-term plans to extend the proposed heavy-rail North West Rail Link to meet the existing Richmond railway line near Vineyard. However, the location of the alignments were never finalised and further investigation and studies would have been required.

State Government documents, dated 13 May 2011, suggested an intention to eventually extend the line to meet the Richmond line near Schofields, two stations south of Vineyard. A Transport Department report dated 9 June 2011 shed more light on such plans, suggesting an extension of the North West Rail Link beyond Rouse Hill to meet the Richmond line at Schofields, Riverstone, or beyond.

A scoping study into rail investment to service Western Sydney and the proposed Western Sydney Airport was announced by the New South Wales and Australian governments in November 2015. The study's final report was released in March 2018 and included a proposal to extend the Sydney Metro Northwest from Tallawong to Schofields, where it would connect with a proposed "North-South Link" serving the airport and continuing on to Macarthur.

== Infrastructure ==
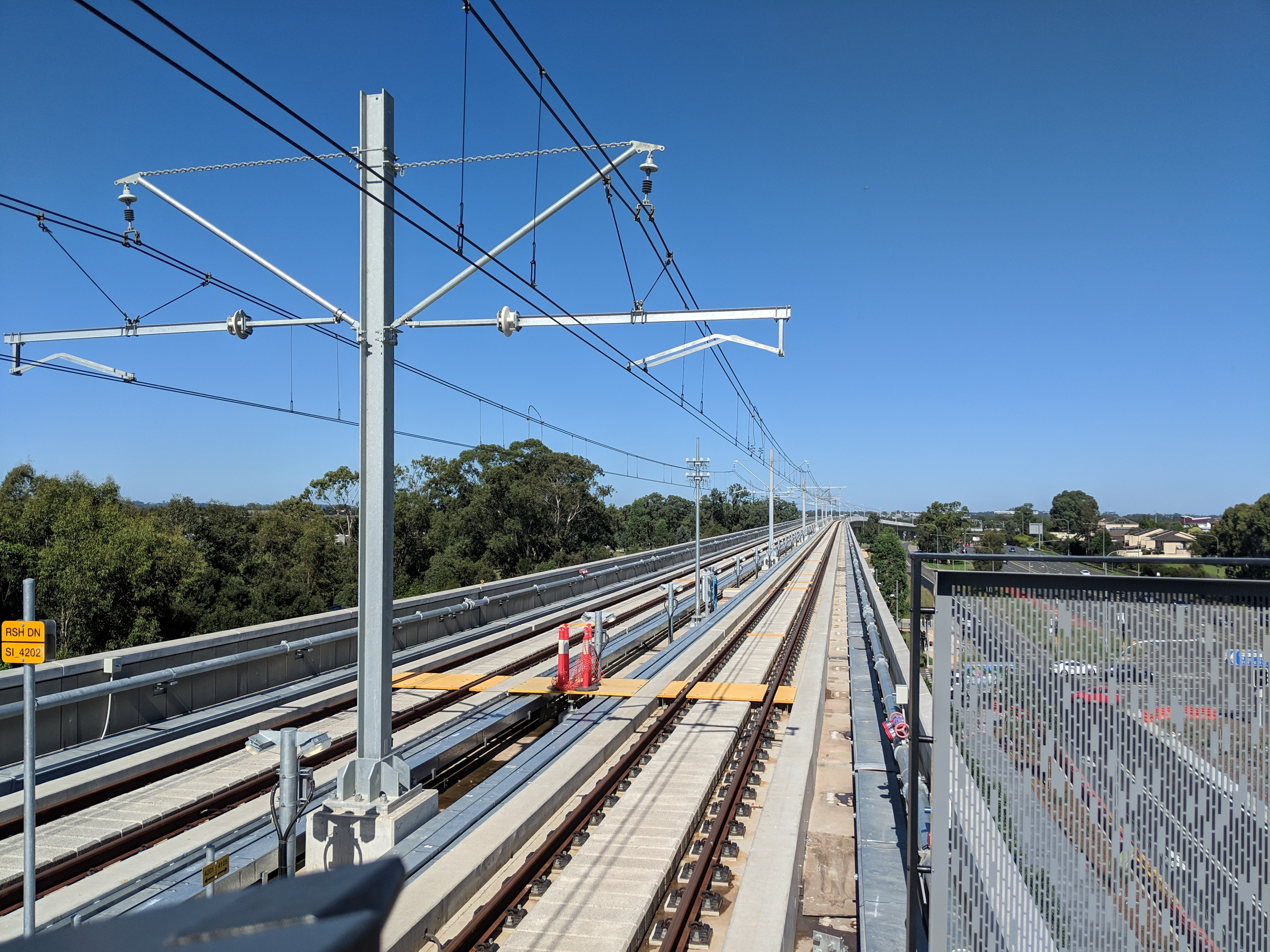
The completed viaduct at Rouse Hill, April 2019

A new train stabling yard was constructed at Tallawong Road in Rouse Hill, with room for 16 train sets. 3,000 new parking spaces are provided across proposed carparks at Cherrybrook, Hills Showground and Kellyville stations.

The entire line is electrified via overhead catenary at 1,500 V DC to power the metro trains. The viaduct and ground level section between Tallawong and Bella Vista uses standard overhead wires to supply power. For the underground section between Bella Vista and Epping, a rigid overhead conductor system is used instead of wires. For the rest of the line (formerly part of the Epping to Chatswood rail link [ECRL]), the existing sagged catenary overhead wires were retained, with an additional copper cable added in some sections due to the increased current draw of the new rolling stock.

There are crossovers at several stations on the line to terminate trains. These are located at Tallawong, Bella Vista, Castle Hill and Chatswood. All crossovers on the ECRL (Lady Game Maintenance Facility and Macquarie Park) were kept, as well as the connection to the surface at Epping. This was kept in case access was required for trackwork vehicles to enter the line, but it has not been used yet. The link to the surface is unwired and there are obstructions placed on the rails.

The line is also equipped with the latest technology for boosting cellular/4G signals. Users of the line have reported extremely stable and fast 4G connections while travelling on this line. Several news channels have also done live crosses via 4G to reporters riding on the line.

The system is designed to operate at a maximum 4-minute headway (15 tph) with 6-car sets in peak on opening day, with design allowance for possible augmentation up to 2.4-minute (25 tph) with 8-car sets in the future.

=== Train automation ===
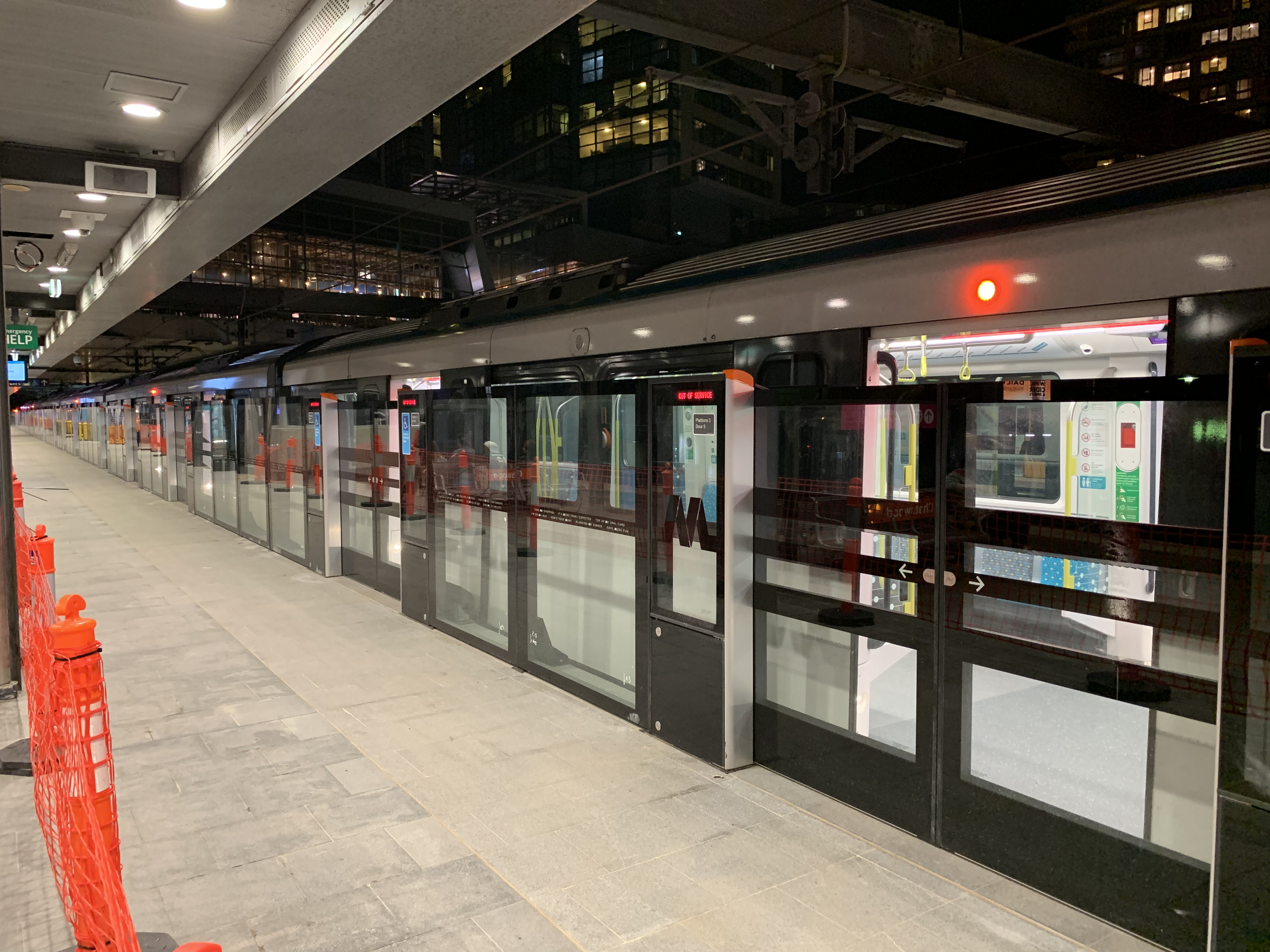
A Metropolis Stock train undergoing testing on the converted line at Chatswood station, April 2019

The line is equipped with Alstom Urbalis 400 moving block CBTC signalling system with ATC under ATO Grade of Automation 4 (UTO), and has subsystems of automatic train protection (ATP), Iconis automatic train supervision (ATS) and Smartlock computer-based interlocking (CBI). There are no physical signals on the track connected to this system. The only physical signals on the track display the status of nearby points, showing a white line pointing towards the direction the points are set, or a red horizontal line to indicate stop. As the signals are merely points indicators, they do not know the position of the next train and will still show a white line even when there is a train up ahead. The location of the next train, along with other information for self-driving, is directly sent to the train through a 5 GHz communications system.

=== Platform screen doors ===
The Metro North West Line stations all have platform screen doors installed to ensure safety. The PSDs themselves were supplied by Faiveley Transport, and the glass on the PSDs was supplied by Qingdao Jinjing Glass Co., Ltd.

== Previous proposals ==
=== 1998 (original) proposal ===
The North West Rail Link was originally announced on 23 November 1998 by Transport Minister Carl Scully, and was part of an $2.6 billion package of eight major rail projects due for construction by 2010 dubbed the Action for Transport 2010. At the time, the proposal was for a $360 million heavy rail connection from Epping to Castle Hill, with potential extension to Mungerie Park and Rouse Hill after 2010.

Delays in 2000 by the Carr Government in releasing a draft report on the proposal led to concern about the viability of the proposed route. This led to a deadlock between the State Government and Baulkham Hills Shire Council regarding construction of the $200 million Mungerie Park industrial and residential development at Kellyville. On 5 June 2000 the Council voted to defer planning approval for the Mungerie Park development until the State Government demonstrated a commitment to improve local transport infrastructure, which included building the North West rail link. In response, the State Government threatened to remove the council's planning powers for the Rouse Hill Development Area if planning approval was not granted. Member for the then-State electorate of The Hills, Michael Richardson, submitted a Freedom of Information request for the draft report on 3 November 2000. The State Government had not responded to the request by 13 December 2000, well beyond the 21-day response limit, leading to accusations that the Government was trying to hide something. The State Government formally rejected the Freedom of Information request on 9 January 2001, despite acknowledging that release of the report would be in the public interest. As a result, the NSW Ombudsman began an investigation into NSW Transport's refusal to release the report.

News reports from March 2001 suggested that cost estimates for the Action for Transport 2010 plan had blown out so much that the scope of the plan was now reduced to an Epping to Chatswood rail link due for completion in 2008. The completion date for the Parramatta to Epping section of the original Parramatta to Chatswood link was unspecified, which meant that the North West rail link proposal was effectively deferred indefinitely—it would not be built until the Parramatta to Chatswood link was completed. The Action for Transport 2010 cost blowout was seen as the reason for the State Government's refusal to release the draft report into the North West rail link route. According to Member for The Hills, Michael Richardson, the Premier Bob Carr effectively confirmed that the Epping to Castle Hill rail link was dead during a session of Parliament on 27 March 2001 when he refused to answer a specific question about the details of the proposed rail link. There was no mention of the rail link in the 2001 budget, released the week of 30 May.

A 2002 NSW Treasury report mentioned the North West rail link, and that it was "under development or investigation", but no estimate of cost or start date were provided. On 10 March 2002, Transport Minister Carl Scully released a report detailing the preferred route alignment. The 19 km (12 mi) route was proposed to run from Epping to Mungerie Park at Rouse Hill via Castle Hill. The cost of construction was estimated at $1.4 billion. Public consultation on the proposal was conducted over eight weeks from 10 March to 3 May 2002. The consultation received 118 written submissions, 73% of which were in favour of the project proceeding, and only 5% strongly opposed the project. On 3 October 2002, the Minister announced a feasibility study for an extension of the proposed route beyond Rouse Hill to meet the existing Richmond Line. Various studies in support of the Epping to Castle Hill link were made during 2003; most of this work related to the proposed alignment of the route. It was revealed on 12 August 2003 that Railcorp was considering a new $6 billion rail link that would connect Hornsby with Campbelltown via the Sydney CBD and that the North West rail link could form an extension to this route.

=== Metropolitan Rail Expansion Program ===
On 9 June 2005, the State Government announced the Metropolitan Rail Expansion Program (MREP), an $8 billion plan to add three new railway lines to the CityRail network over the following 15 years. The MREP included the South West Rail Link, North West Rail Link and the CBD Rail Link and was intended to augment transport links between the major new growth and employment areas of the Sydney metropolitan region. In 2005, the schedule was revised and a new completion date of 2017 was set. In 2006 the construction schedule was revised with a new completion date of 2017. In April 2006, the NSW Transport Infrastructure Development Corporation released the North West Rail Link Project Application and Preliminary Environmental Assessment in support of the planning approval process. On 20 November 2006, the government announced a staged plan for the North West Rail Link with train services to Castle Hill and Hills Centre in 2015, two years ahead of the original completion date of 2017.

==== Proposed route ====
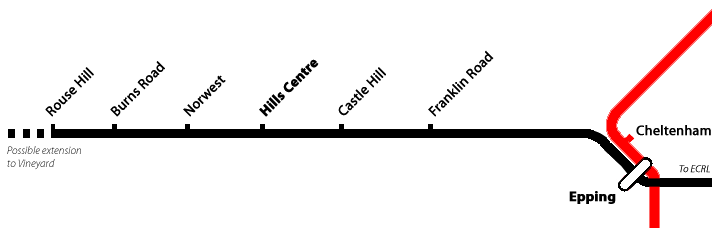
Diagram of the North West Rail Link. The line is marked in black.

The original North West Rail Link route proposal was planned to be 22 km (14 mi) in length, consisting of a 16 km (9.9 mi) tunnel (underground) section from Epping to the proposed Burns Road Station, followed by a 4 km (2.5 mi) section above ground from Burns Road Station (now Kellyville Station) to Rouse Hill. A train stabling facility was proposed to the north west of Rouse Hill Town Centre.

The latest version of the original proposal proposed to connect the North West Rail Link alignment to the Epping to Chatswood Rail Link via a tunnel between Epping and Franklin Road (now Cherrybrook) stations, whereas the earliest version of the original proposal had the route alignment connect with the existing Northern Line north of Cheltenham. The direct route proposed using the stub tunnels originally built for the deferred Parramatta Rail Link between Parramatta and Epping. New stub tunnels for the Parramatta Rail Link were to be constructed so that if the Epping to Parramatta line were completed, trains from Parramatta would have also been able to link into the Epping-Chatswood Line.

Original proposed station at Castle Hill

Six new stations were proposed along the North West Rail Link:

- Epping
- Franklin Road (now Cherrybrook)
- Castle Hill
- Hills Centre (now Hills Showground)
- Norwest
- Burns Road (now Kellyville)
- Rouse Hill

The line was scheduled to open in two stages: the first stage from Epping to Hills Centre Station was scheduled for completion by 2015 (originally 2017), and the second stage from Hills Centre to Rouse Hill Station was scheduled for completion by 2017. Construction was scheduled to begin in 2010. The original proposal called for off-peak rail service of four trains per hour, with six to eight trains per hour in peak periods. The route was expected to carry six to eight million passengers per year.

The concept plan was approved in May 2008. However, the North West Rail Link proposal was replaced by the North West Metro two months earlier in March 2008 by the Iemma Government as part of the development of a metro-style rapid transit system called Metro Link.

=== North West Metro ===
In March 2008, the Government changed the project to a metro line dubbed the North West Metro as part of the Metro Link, and expanded the line to run all the way to the Sydney CBD via the suburbs of Ryde, Gladesville, Drummoyne and Pyrmont. The inability of Iemma to privatise the state-owned electricity sector to fund the metro project culminated in his resignation as NSW premier in September 2008, and the appointment of Nathan Rees as his successor.

=== CBD Metro ===
On 23 October 2008, the month-old Rees government announced the CBD Metro, a shortened version of the North West Metro which would run from Rozelle to Central station, and the project was submitted to Infrastructure Australia for funding. It was announced that North West Metro may be extended to link from Rozelle to Epping and Macquarie Park in the future if the CBD Metro was built. Then, on 31 October 2008, the NSW Government announced that the North West Metro would be indefinitely deferred due to budgetary cuts.

=== Resumption of original proposal ===
On 21 February 2010, two and a half months after Kristina Keneally had become Premier, the NSW Government revealed the cancellation of the Sydney Metro project in its Metropolitan Transport Plan and returned to the North West Rail Link proposal. At the time, construction was anticipated to begin in 2017. In August 2010 the State Government applied to Infrastructure Australia for funding to accelerate the delivery of the project, but no funding was granted.

=== 2011 proposal ===
Following his victory in the NSW state election on 26 March 2011, newly elected Premier Barry O'Farrell announced that his first order of business would be to start construction on the North West Rail Link. On 6 April 2011, Premier O'Farrell and newly installed Transport Minister Gladys Berejiklian announced the project team that would be responsible for construction and delivery of the North West Rail Link. It was expected that initial planning and geotechnical investigation of the route corridor would begin by the end of 2011, with construction beginning before the 2015 state election.

==== Proposed route ====
When the O'Farrell Government took office, it proposed that the line would form part of the mainline network and would be served by double deck rolling stock, like other rail lines in Sydney. A report released in July 2011 indicated that upon opening of the line, four to six trains per hour would connect Rouse Hill station with Chatswood station via Epping. Of these, only as few as 2 trains per hour would be able to continue from Chatswood to the CBD due to capacity constraints on the North Shore line.

The design was changed to a driverless rapid transit line, featuring more frequent, lower capacity single deck trains. All trains would terminate at Chatswood, with passengers required to change to North Shore line trains to continue to the city.

The route proposal put forward in May 2011 by the State Government was a 23-kilometre (14 mi) rail route with six new stations, and the possibility of two more to be built at some point in the future. The proposed stations were:

- Epping
- Cherrybrook
- Castle Hill
- Hills Centre
- Norwest 1
- Norwest 2
- Kellyville (Burns Road)
- Samantha Riley Drive (possible)
- Rouse Hill
- Cudgegong Road (possible)

==== Call for tenders ====
On 15 May 2011, Transport Minister Gladys Berejiklian announced that a tender had been called for engineering, rail systems and architecture services. A tender was called on 6 June 2011 for a financial and commercial services specialist. The tender documents indicate the Government's desire to appoint a financial adviser to examine the possibility of securing funding from private sources.

Tenders were called on 10 June 2011 for a range of services including geotechnical work, master planning and urban design, scheduling and planning support, integrated transport and land use services, and legal services. Applications for the first six of twelve tenders closed the week of 8 July 2011 with 44 proposals having been received from a range of Australian and international companies. The first six tenders were for financial services, geotechnical investigations, integrated transport and land use studies, scheduling and program support, legal services, and master planning and urban design. As part of the tender process, applicants were asked to demonstrate how they would design station precincts at the Rouse Hill, Samantha Riley Drive and Cudgegong Road sites. The geotechnical information is required to determine the best method of tunnelling through the Hawkesbury sandstone that underlies much of the Sydney basin.

Gladys Berejiklian announced on 14 July 2011 that the first major tender—for design services—had been awarded to a consortium of AECOM, Cox Architects, Grimshaw Architects and Parsons Brinckerhoff. The consortium were tasked with investigating route alignment options, rail systems, tunnel design, station locations and infrastructure planning. AECOM also lodged applications for the master plan and integrated transport tenders. Consulting firm Turner & Townsend were awarded the tender for cost planning services on 22 July 2011.

==== Impasse over Federal funding ====
The Gillard Federal Government refused to commit any funding to the North West Rail Link because it favoured completion of the Parramatta to Epping section of the Parramatta to Chatswood route. The refusal dates back to a promise made during the 2010 federal election campaign, when Gillard's Australian Labor Party announced the federal government would fund 80 per cent ($2.1 billion) of the construction of the Parramatta to Epping rail link if it were re-elected at the 2010 federal election.

NSW Premier Barry O'Farrell asked Prime Minister Gillard in his first official meeting with her after becoming Premier in April 2011 to divert the Federal funds allocated to the Parramatta to Epping rail link to the North West Rail Link project. Despite this, the Federal Government did not allocate any funds to the North West Rail Link in the 2011 Australian federal budget. At least part of the reason for the snub, apart from the Federal Government's transport priorities, is the fact that the O'Farrell State Government did not submit a project proposal for the North West Rail Link to Infrastructure Australia.

Results of a cost-benefit analysis released in November 2011 indicated that the North West Rail Link would be three times more beneficial to New South Wales than the Parramatta to Epping extension. The report also indicated that the cost of constructing the Parramatta–Epping line would cost $1.78 billion more than initially expected.

Infrastructure Australia formally rejected Infrastructure NSW's request for $2.1 billion in funding in May 2012, saying the project was "not the highest priority" transport project for Sydney. Instead, Infrastructure Australia suggested an expansion of the bus network and better transport links with Parramatta. Infrastructure Australia cited the lack of a completed proposal and lack of information on cost, infrastructure and development as reasons for the rejection. The State Government vowed to build the line with or without federal funding.

== Criticism ==
- The Mayor of the Hill Shire Council, Michelle Byrne, has criticised the Sydney Metro Northwest for not being connected to the future Western Sydney Airport. The Metro is likewise not connected to the T5 Cumberland Line at Schofields Station, despite it being less than 4 km (2.5 mi) from Tallawong. Dr Byrne believes that creating a North-South Rail Link would also travel through Marsden Park, an industrial and commercial centre of Greater Western Sydney.
- Emails originating within the NSW Treasury by Principal Financial Analyst, Rodney Forrest to RailCorp Manager of Finance, Peter Crimp were released as part of a Parliamentary Standing Order 52 in October 2011 indicating that the North West Rail Link would have to be subsidised by the state government by about $80 per passenger based on predictions of population and passenger volumes in 2021. Across the Sydney Trains network this equates to about $30 per passenger in 2021, compared to $10 per passenger in 2010. The modelling by NSW Treasury estimates that the North West Rail Link would generate only 9 million new passengers annually, or 2.15% of all CityRail trips. A Hills Shire councillor questioned the size of these estimates based on the projected population increase in the region over the next 8 years.
- Criticism has been made that double-deck trains would permit more seats to be carried per hour, and that passengers on long trips prefer to be comfortably seated. A rebuttal to this claim has been made that longitudinal seating, which is actually the standard form of seating on most metro trains around the world, allows for ease of access for transient "hop-on, hop-off" passengers, and particularly for those with prams or trolleys. In the instance of journeys in which many people will be hopping on and off, longitudinal seating allows for people to stand and exit from their seat easily, as well as providing more standing or walking room along the carriage.
- The government has announced that the bus services which connect the Sydney CBD with the north-west using the M2 Hills Motorway will be withdrawn when the NWRL opens and be replaced by rail feeder services to stations on the NWRL. Research has shown that trips from most of the north-west will take longer on bus-train combination than on bus alone. However, closer to the opening, the government changed its plans and decided not to cut any bus services for the first few months. On 28 July 2019, major changes were made to bus services. M2 express services were not completely withdrawn, but there were plenty of other changes which increased travel times for some commuters. A major criticism is that most metro feeder buses do not operate frequently enough, particularly during offpeak times.
- Due to the inadequate feeder bus services, many commuters are using commuter carparks at metro stations. Even though fairly large carparks have been built at several stations, all carparks reach capacity very early each morning. Some stations do not have carparks at all. Experts state that the government will never be able to provide enough parking spaces to meet demand and instead recommend making further changes to feeder buses.
- Documents obtained after a Freedom of Information (FoI) request revealed that warnings had been made to government about the inconvenience to northern suburbs commuters from initially terminating the rail link at Chatswood.
- Greens NSW Spokesperson for Transport Dr Mehreen Faruqi has criticised the future passenger-carrying capacity of the project.

== See also ==
- Sydney Metro (2008 proposal)
- Rogans Hill railway line (Original railway to the Hills District)
- Proposed railways in Sydney
- Transport in Sydney in the 2010s
