= Castle Towers =

Castle Towers Shopping Centre
- Castle Towers Logo
- Location: Castle Hill, New South Wales, Australia
- Coordinates: 33°43′50″S 151°00′22″E
- Opened: October 1982
- Owner: Queensland Investment Corporation
- Num. of stores: 317 (as of December 2019)
- Num. of anchor tenants: 11
- Floor area: 117,700 m^{2} (1,267,000 sq ft) (lettable, as of December 2019)
- Floors: 3
- Parking: Over 5,000 spaces (as of December 2019)
- Public transit: Castle Hill station, M60, M61, 600, 610, 612
- Website: castletowers.com.au

Castle Towers Shopping Centre is a shopping centre in Castle Hill, New South Wales, Australia. It is owned by the Queensland Investment Corporation.

It has a net leasable area of approximately 112,000 square metres, making it one of Australia's largest shopping centres.

== History ==
Castle Towers opened in 1982 with Kmart, Coles and Norman Ross as the major retailers. The centre was expanded to include David Jones and Franklins in November 1991. In August 1993, the Greater Union site was launched and in October of the same year Target replaced Norman Ross. In September 1999, the second Greater Union site opened, as well as 44 specialty retailers including the Piazza restaurant precinct. In April 2000, Target and David Jones launched their extensions with the addition of Food For Less and Bi-Lo replacing Franklins as it moves to Castle Mall and a further 76 stores.

In August 2001, the final stage of the centre opened including a two level Grace Bros and 34 upmarket fashion retailers. In January 2007, Food For Less was replaced by Dan Murphy's. In June 2009, Greater Union opened its premium five screen cinema complex as Event Cinemas which replaced six old screens built in 1993. Castle Towers' new Event Cinemas were architecturally designed with five auditoriums and a bar all featuring "Gold Class". It is the first of its kind in the world because it features the latest digital cinema technology including new digital projectors and electronic reclining chairs. On the same month, Myer added a new floor on the lower level and relaunched the Myer store as three levels.

In November 2013, Castle Towers commenced a $20 million car park upgrade which involved the introduction of electronic parking guidance technology and general car park improvements such as new paint finishes, brighter and energy efficient lighting, improved directional signage and the installation of parking guidance infrastructure. The works were completed in December 2014.

On 5 December 2019, a $180 million expansion of the centre on level 1 opened, with an underground pedestrian tunnel linking the centre to Castle Hill station. The redevelopment also introduced a new food court and additional specialty and mini major retailers, taking up space previously held by a car park. The expansion was the first stage of a long term town centre master plan (see Redevelopment section), which includes refurbishment work on levels 2 and 3 and the Piazza in 2020, followed by a major redevelopment to commence in 2021.

== Redevelopment ==
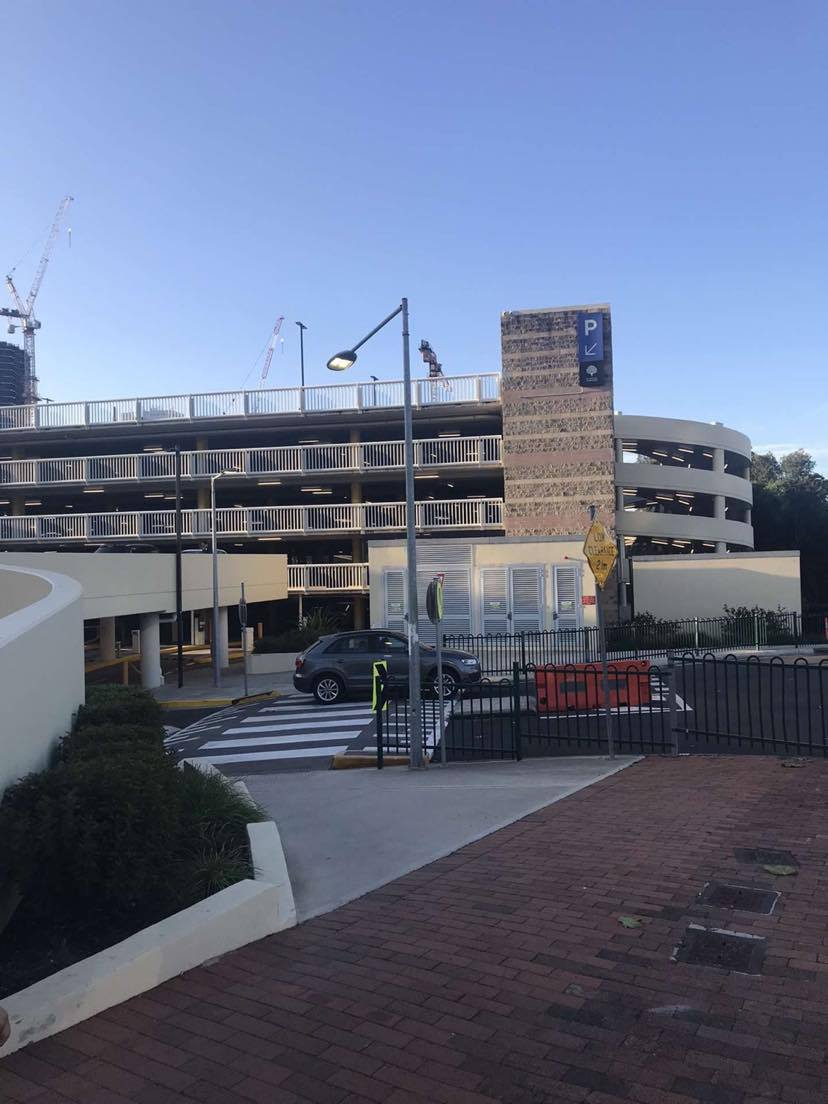
Castle Towers Shopping Centre in May 2020

A development application to expand the centre by 60,000 square metres was approved in February 2011 by the Hills Shire Council. The centre will undergo a $285 million expansion, which will include a new 16-screen cinema complex, an eat-street area, 3,085 additional parking spaces, as well as new retail stores. Shopping centres in Sydney's metropolitan area such as Westfield Parramatta and Westfield Bondi Junction will be eclipsed in size after the huge expansion. Castle Towers is expected to become one of the largest shopping centres in Australia after the redevelopment, with 170,000 square metres of active floorspace, behind Westfield Fountain Gate (174,000m²) and Chadstone Shopping Centre (190,000m²).

A new proposal by Queensland Investment Corporation was released in March 2015 to expand the centre. The $1 billion expansion plans to demolish the centre south of Target and David Jones and refurbish the retained sections. A new extension is planned on the outdoor carpark off Pennant Street, integrating a food court, specialty stores, restaurants and will also include the construction of five high-rise towers. Unlike the previous proposal, the redevelopment will not take place on the land next to Castle Grand and Kentwell Avenue. With this proposal, Castle Towers is expected to become one of Australia's largest shopping centres with a retail floor area of approximately 150,000 square metres. The first stage of the expansion opened on 5 December 2019. Future plans have since been put on hold following the COVID-19 pandemic.
