= Castle Hill metro station =

Sydney Metro railway station

Castle Hill
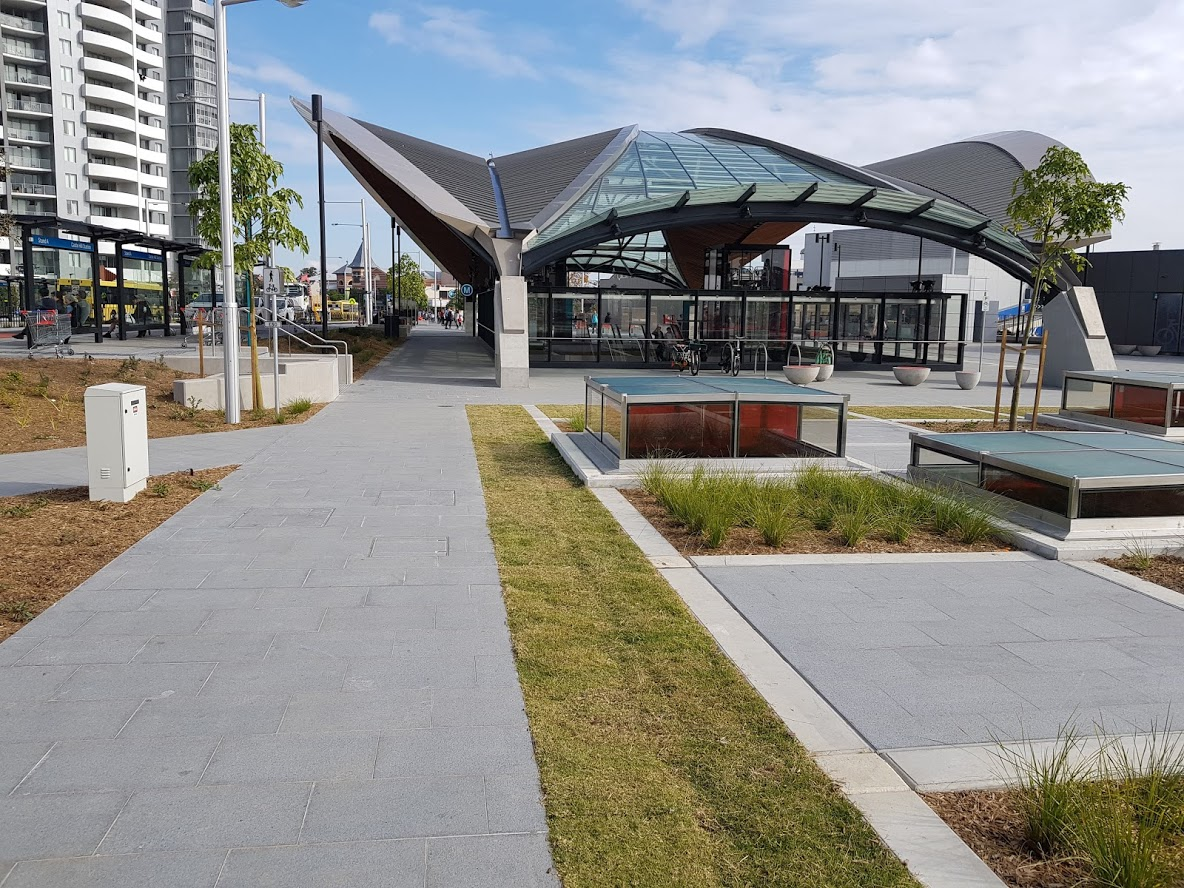
- View of station building, looking westward, June 2019

General information
- Location: Old Castle Hill Road, Castle Hill; New South Wales; Australia
- Coordinates: 33°43′54″S 151°00′27″E
- Elevation: 25 m (82 ft) below ground level
- Owner: New South Wales Government via Transport Asset Manager of New South Wales
- Operator: Metro Trains Sydney
- Distance: 21km from Chatswood
- Platforms: 2
- Train operators: Metro Trains Sydney
- Connections: Bus

Construction
- Structure type: Underground
- Cycle facilities: 20 spaces
- Accessible: Yes

History
- Opened: 26 May 2019

Passengers
- 2023: 3,103,800 (year); 8,504 (daily) (Sydney Metro)

Services
Preceding station	Sydney Metro	Following station
Hills Showground towards Tallawong	M1 Metro North West & Bankstown Line	Cherrybrook towards Bankstown
Location

Castle Hill railway station is an underground Sydney Metro station in Castle Hill, New South Wales, Australia. The station, located opposite the Castle Towers shopping centre, was built as part of the Sydney Metro Northwest project, to serve Metro North West & Bankstown Line train services to Tallawong, Chatswood and the Sydney central business district. The station now serves Bankstown as part of the government's 20-year Sydney's Rail Future strategy.

== History ==
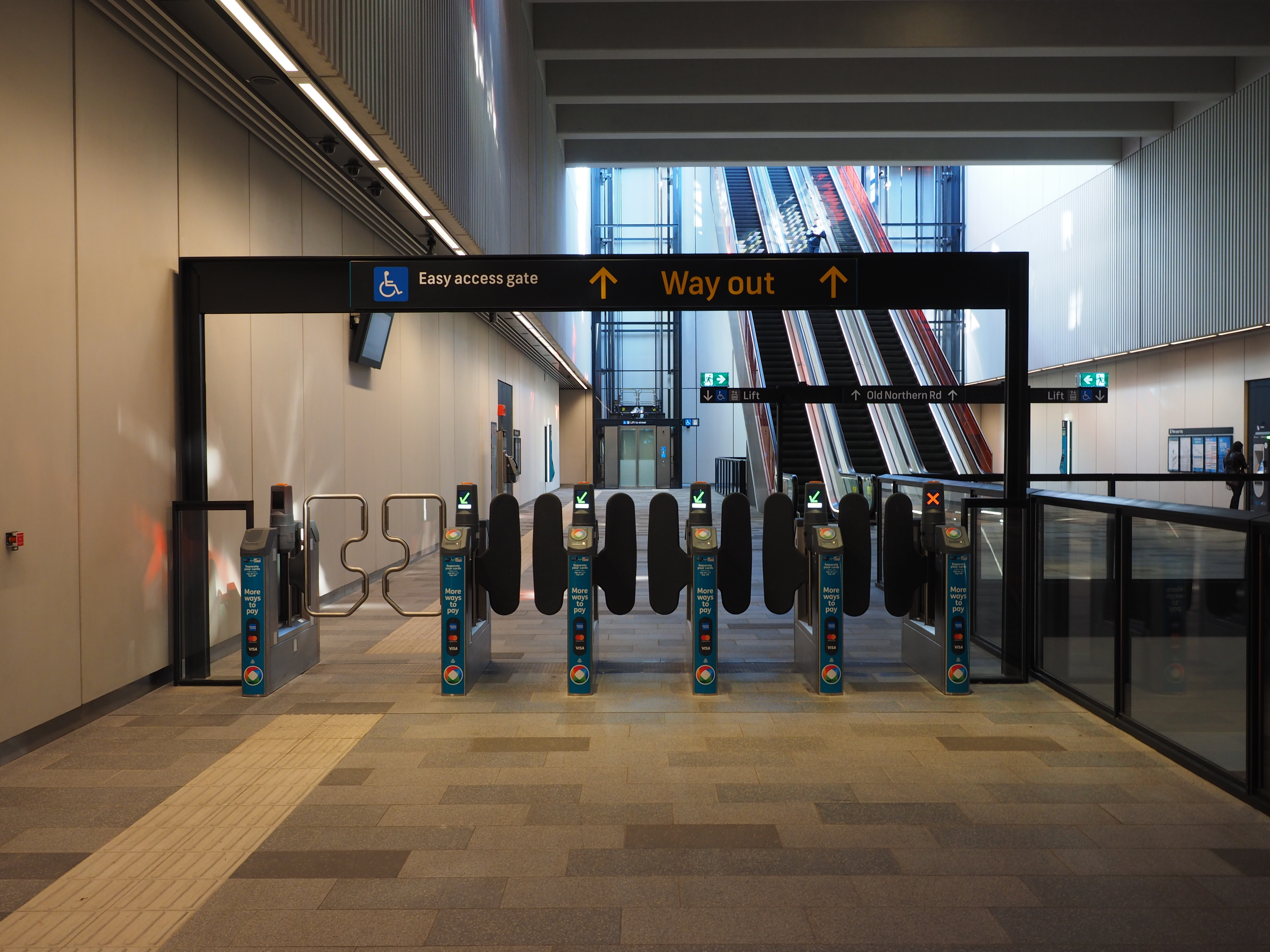
Underground concourse

The NSW Government announced a future railway line from Epping to Castle Hill as part of its Action for Public Transport strategy in 1998. In the years that followed, Castle Hill Station formed part of successive north-western rail proposals, including the Metropolitan Rail Expansion Plan in 2005 and a short-lived metro proposal in 2008.

Work on the North West Rail Link got underway with the election of the O'Farrell Government in 2011. The new station was opened to passengers 26 May 2019. The station is operated by Metro Trains Sydney which was also responsible for the design of the station as part of its Operations, Trains and Systems contract with Transport for NSW.

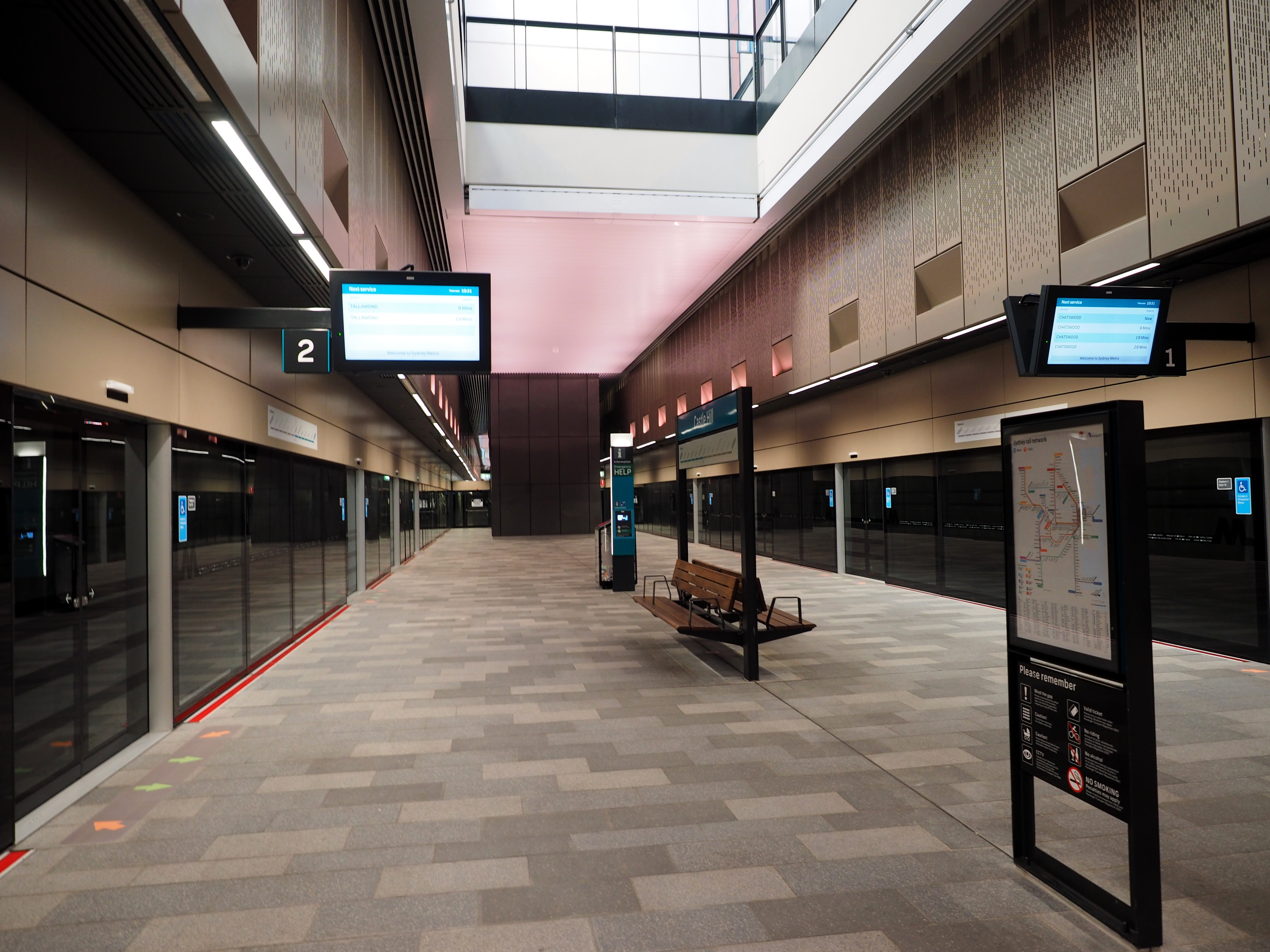
Platforms

To make way for the construction of the station, part of Old Northern Road was converted into a bus-only region. The underground pedestrian tunnel was also converted to Castle Towers which opened on 5 December 2019, in conjunction with the shopping centre's expansion.

== Services ==
Castle Hill has two platforms and two crossovers, which can be used to terminate westbound trains on either platform if there is a problem on the line. It is served by Metro North West & Bankstown Line services. Castle Hill station is served by a number of bus routes operated by Busways and CDC NSW.

Platform	Line	Stopping pattern	Notes
1	M1 Metro North West & Bankstown Line	Services to Bankstown	
2	M1 Metro North West & Bankstown Line	services to Tallawong	

External image
- Castle Hills Bus Guide by Transport for NSW
