= Ron Christie (rail administrator) =

Australian public servant

Ronald David Christie AM is a retired Australian public servant.

Christie commenced his career as cadet engineer with the Department of Railways New South Wales, becoming general manager of operations of the Public Transport Commission in August 1979, then deputy chief executive of the State Rail Authority in July 1980. He later served as director-general of the Department of Public Works, head of the Roads & Traffic Authority, head of transport for the Sydney 2000 Olympic Games, and Co-ordinator General of the state's rail industry before retiring in June 2001.

In the 2002 Australia Day Honours Christie was made a Member of the Order of Australia (AM) in recognition of his "service to public administration, particularly transport management in New South Wales".
