= North Ryde =

- Suburb
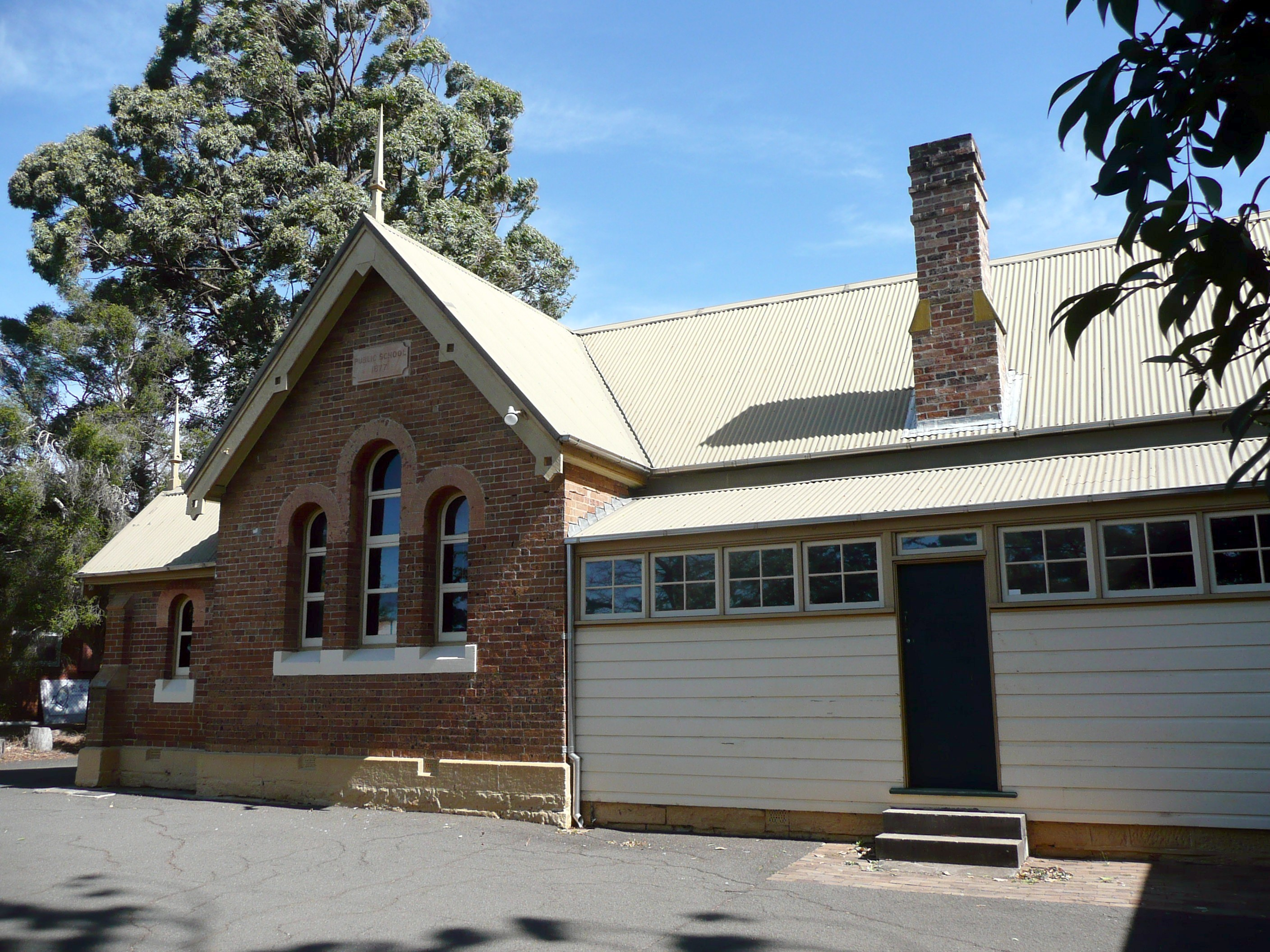
- North Ryde Public School, established in 1877

- Interactive map of North Ryde
- Country: Australia
- State: New South Wales
- City: Sydney
- LGA: City of Ryde
- Location: 15 km (9.3 mi) NW of Sydney CBD

Government
  - State electorate: Ryde, Lane Cove
  - Federal division: Bennelong

Area
  - Total: 5.36 km^{2} (2.07 sq mi)
- Elevation: 57 m (187 ft)

Population
  - Total: 14,043 (SAL 2021)
- Postcode: 2113
Suburbs around North Ryde
Marsfield	Macquarie Park	Chatswood West
Eastwood	North Ryde	Lane Cove West
Denistone East	Ryde	East Ryde

North Ryde is a suburb located in the Northern Sydney region of Sydney, New South Wales, Australia. North Ryde is located 15 kilometres north-west of the Sydney central business district, in the local government area of the City of Ryde.

One of Australia's major business districts, North Ryde is home to many multi-national corporations such as Hewlett-Packard, Oracle and Honeywell. The suburb is the site of Macquarie University and its residents include those from the university academe and the research sector. The CSIRO also has a major site on Delhi Road in the Riverside Corporate Park.

North Ryde shares the postcode of 2113 with adjacent suburbs Macquarie Park and East Ryde. These suburbs were once part of North Ryde and many businesses and residences in these suburbs still advertise their address as being in North Ryde. Adjacent Macquarie University was issued with its own postcode, 2109, by Australia Post in the late 1980s.

== History ==
The earliest reference to the area being known as North Ryde appears to be after the district's first public school (which opened on 25 January 1878) changed its name from City View Public School to North Ryde Public School in 1879. North Ryde was mainly farming area, until in 1897, it was sold to a Catholic parish. North Ryde is an extension of the adjacent suburb of Ryde which was named after the 'Ryde Store', a business run by G.M. Pope. He adopted the name from his birthplace of Ryde on the Isle of Wight, in the UK. Ryde was the name used from the 1840s and adopted as the name of the municipality in 1870.

== Aboriginal culture ==
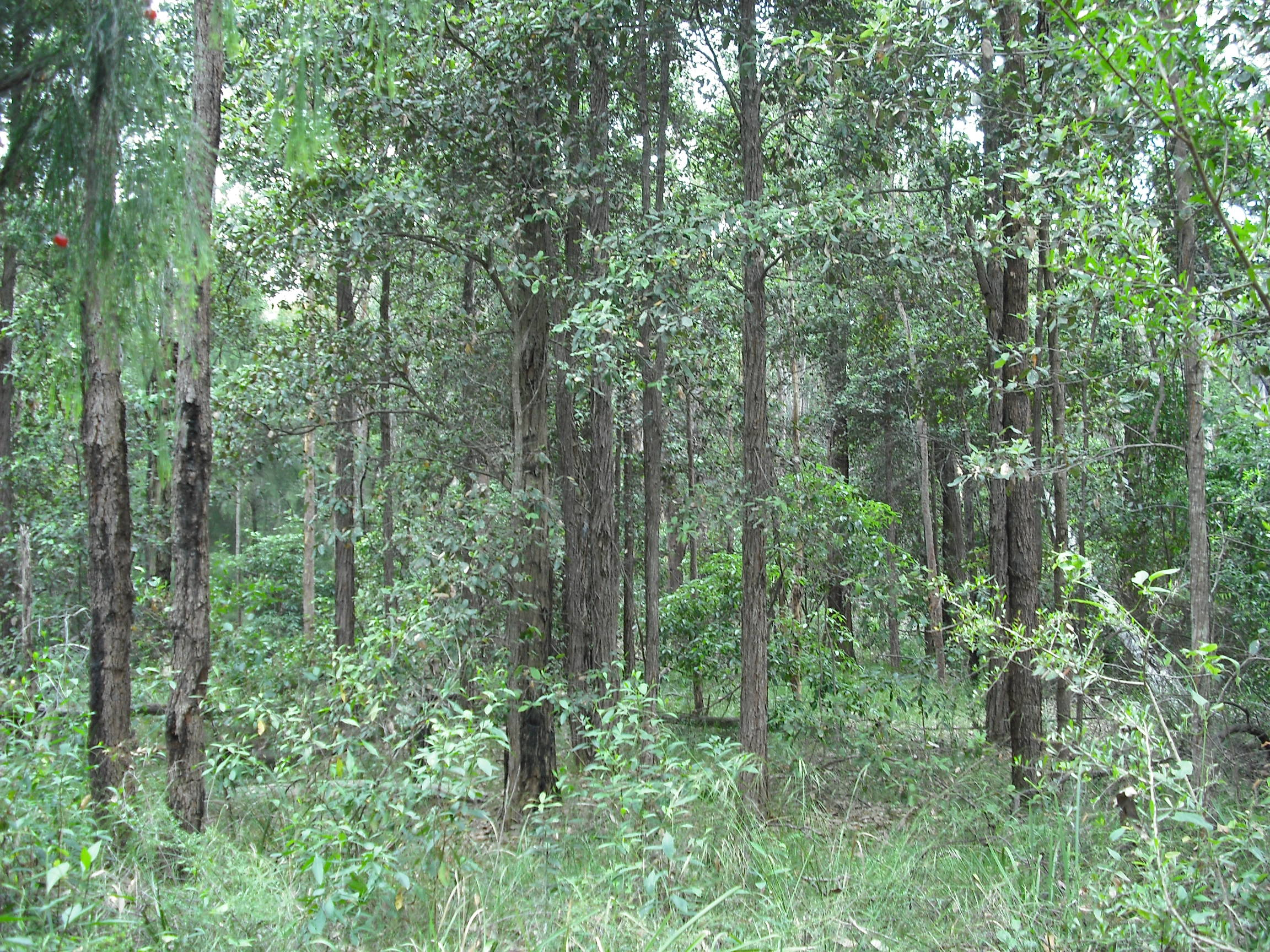
Wallumatta Nature Reserve

The whole area between the Parramatta and Lane Cove Rivers was originally populated by Indigenous Australians and known by its Aboriginal name Wallumatta. Contact with the first white settlement's bridgehead into Australia quickly devastated much of the population through epidemics of smallpox and other diseases. The Aboriginal name survives in a local reserve, the Wallumatta Nature Reserve, located at the corner of Twin and Cressy roads, North Ryde. Very few remnants of Sydney Turpentine-Ironbark Forest still exist. The most substantial undisturbed area is the Wallumatta Nature Reserve in North Ryde, which is owned and managed by the NSW National Parks & Wildlife Service. This small and critically endangered reserve, also known as the Macquarie Hospital Bushland, is one of the last remnants of the remaining 0.5% (as at 2007) of original and endangered turpentine-ironbark forests on Wianamatta shale soil in Sydney. See Sydney Turpentine-Ironbark Forest.

== European settlement ==
Ryde is the third oldest settlement in Australia, after Sydney and Parramatta. The name 'Eastern Farms' was given to the district with the 10 initial land grants in 1792. This name remained in use for a few years before 'Kissing Point' became the common name. North Ryde was established in the mid 19th century as a farming district, in what was a heavily vegetated area, next to the already established district of Ryde. The Field of Mars Common was considered dangerous, as escaped convicts and bushrangers were known to frequent the area.

=== Early European settlers ===
The earliest settler to receive a land grant in the area bordered by the Field of Mars Common and Bridge/Twin and Badajoz Roads that is now North Ryde was Jane Wood in 1800. Following land grants were to David Brown in 1802, William Kent Jnr in 1803, "Tudor Farm" being the largest land grant in the district, which included all the land between Lane Cove, Herring, Bridge and Waterloo roads, James Weavers and Michael Connor in 1804, and Thomas Granger in 1809.

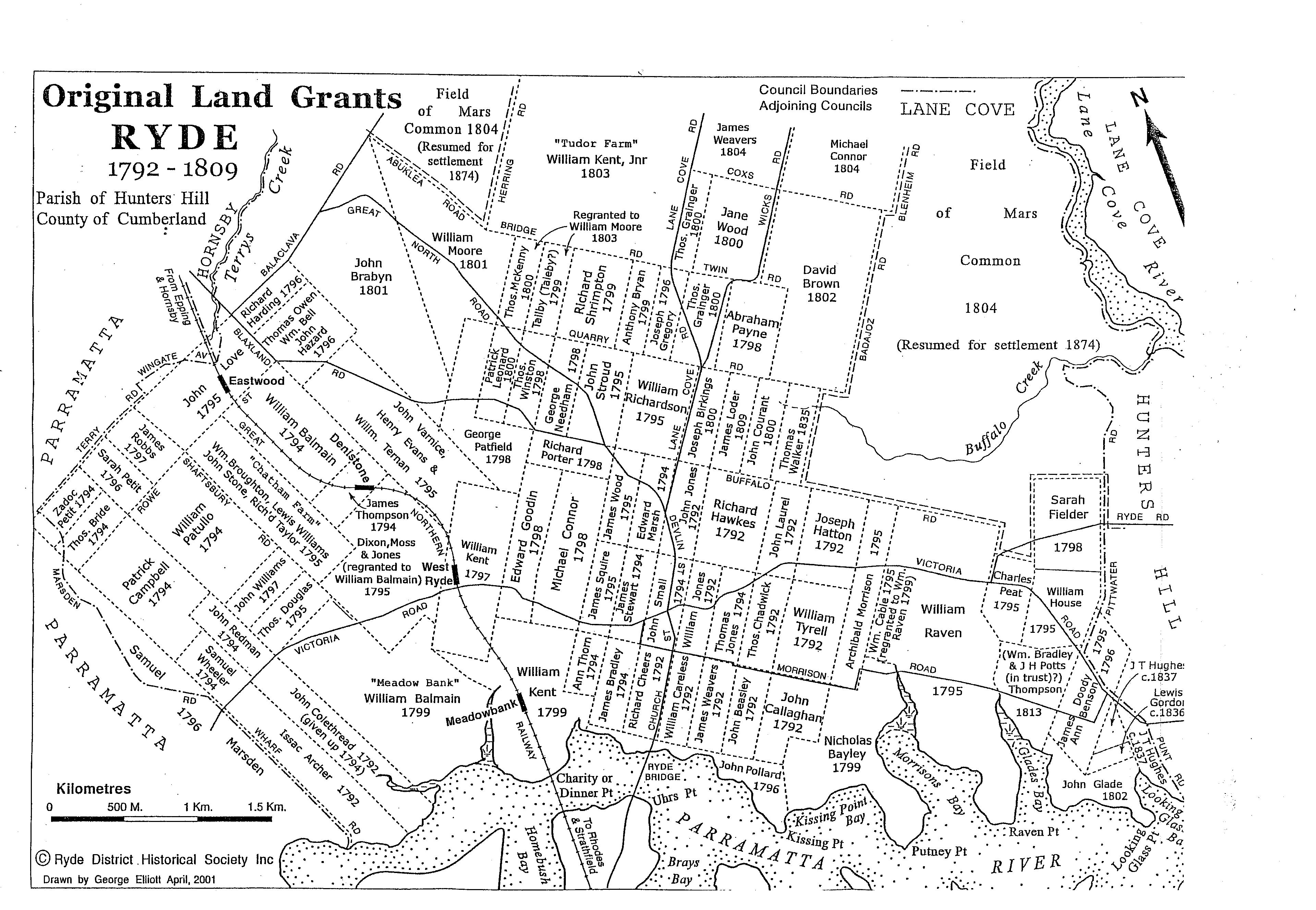
Map of Original Land Grants RYDE 1792-1809. Source: Ryde District Historical Society.

Amongst the earliest settlers was James Weavers, a farm labourer born in 1752, who was sentenced to death at 28 March 1787 Bury St Edmunds (Suffolk) Assizes. His sentence was reduced to transportation for life and he arrived in the colony aboard the ship Surprize on 26 June 1790. He was granted 30 acres of land in what is now Putney. He married Mary Hutchinson (1765-1850) in 1792 and they had four children. James Weavers and his descendants were part of a remarkable pioneering family whose members variously survived the hardships of harsh conditions, disease, infant mortality and the tragic loss of many of its members in an isolated settlement. James Weavers did well as a farmer and in 1803 he purchased a 60-acre farm (originally granted to Jane Wood, now the site of the North Ryde Golf Course) and received a 100-acre grant of adjoining land in 1804. James Weavers is thought to have been killed by Aborigines on 3 April 1805 and although his burial was registered at St Philips Church, his descendants believe that he was buried on his own land. The earliest settlers to farm in the Putney district were often related by marriages and this included the Weavers, Wicks, Benson, Cox, Hicks and Heard families of North Ryde.

Henry Heard came to Sydney from Devonshire and acquired four acres of land on Twin Road and planted an orchard. He and his wife Mary Jane had nine children, four sons and five daughters born between 1859 and 1876. Apart from the first child, William, who was born and died in 1859 and registered in St Leonards, all the other children were registered in Ryde. Therefore, the growing Heard family must have come to the district just before 1860. He continued to acquire more acreage and expand his orchards and vineyards. After his death one of his sons obtained a further 24 acres, bounded on the north and north-east by Joseph Cox's property, on the south and south-east by Wicks Road, on the south-west by Twin Road. In addition to this orchard he also obtained 12 acres of bush land which was further cleared to expand the farm. The Heard's orchard was named the Model Farm. Two of Heard's cottages survive to this day, the main house at 505 Twin Road and semi-detached Orchard House (1890) and Heards Cottage (1895) on the corner of Cox's and Wicks Roads, North Ryde and is listed on Ryde Council's Heritage List (No. 97).

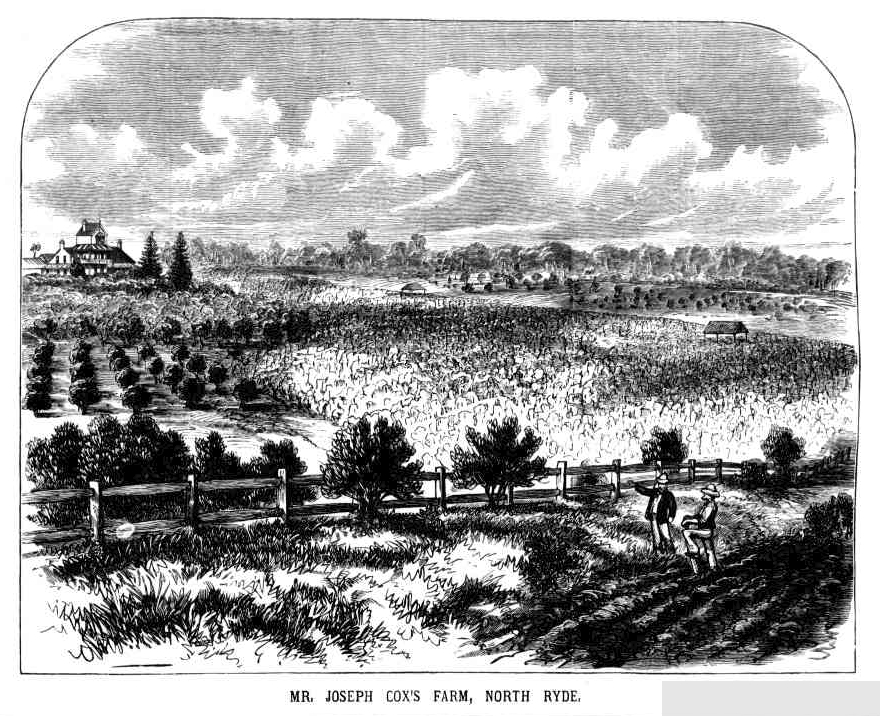
Joseph Cox's farm, North Ryde, c.1882

Around 1868 Joseph Cox and his brother William, originally from Kent in England, purchased 21 acres of land in North Ryde for £1425. William left to pursue farming on the other side of the Parramatta River. Joseph, along with his wife persevered and named their homestead "Pomona". They had six children. With extensive orchards and vineyards, Joseph was also a skilled winemaker. Around 1880 Joseph built a three storey manor from locally quarried stone, and a private carriageway with entrance and exit to Cox's Road via ornate iron gates hinged on skillfully dressed stone pillars. From the upstairs verandah they had an excellent view of Sydney. "Pomona" was located near the North Ryde Public School on the opposite side of Cox's Road.

George Wicks was the Mayor of Ryde in 1876 and he and his wife Sarah Goulding had a total of 12 children. Henry William Watts (Sarah Weavers’ son from her second marriage to William Watts) served as an alderman on Ryde Council and was Mayor from 1886 to 1887. These descendants of James Weavers were orchardists with properties bordering the Field of Mars Common in North Ryde. They were among a few men and women who represented the sizeable proportion of Ryde's population who were small landholders based on family farms and who actively campaigned for a local school in what is now North Ryde.

=== Motorcycling ===
In 1928 the Chatswood Motorcycle Club built a course in the area now known as the Commandment Rock Picnic Area of Lane Cove National Park. The North Ryde circuit was an early version of off-road speedway. The first North Ryde meetings were held in May and October 1928. It was reported that the October meeting attracted 7000 spectators. The Commandment Rock course was closed and another circuit known as the North Ryde Speedway was developed on what is now part of North Ryde Golf Course (then known as Cox's Paddock), opposite from the present day School of Arts in Cox's Road. The track was located in a natural amphitheatre giving spectators an excellent view of the events. A typical meeting comprised 30 events of ten laps each. It closed in about 1935 when the golf course development began and the Chatswood Club merged with Willoughby Motor Cycle Club. One upcoming rider was Ray "Broadside" Taylor, who went on to become Australian Speedway Champion and an international speedway star of the 1930s and 1940s. His motorcycle was named "Daisy" after his wife. As a boy he moved with his family from Dubbo, to the Sydney suburb of West Ryde where he finished his education. His first dirt track race meeting was at North Ryde run by the Chatswood Motorcycle Club where he won five of the six races entered.

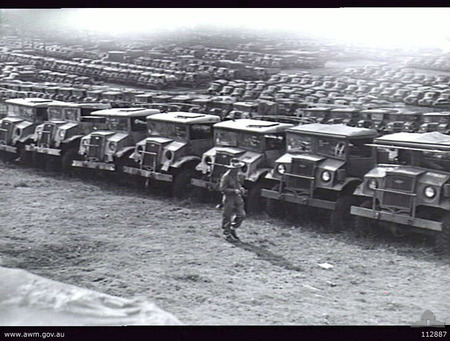
3 Australian Ordnance Vehicle Park at North Ryde in 1943

=== World War II ===
During World War II, a substantial army base, the 3rd Australian Ordnance Army Vehicle Park was located in North Ryde, bounded by Epping, Wicks, Cox's and Blenheim Roads. Substantial numbers of Jeeps, tanks, transports, emergency motorcycles, generator sets and searchlights, and various military vehicles and equipment were located there, along with heavy transport workshops, personnel and barracks.

=== Post-World War II ===
North Ryde remained rural until after World War II, with a small population whose main activity up until that time was farming. Orchards, market gardens, vineyards and poultry predominated the landscape. In the 1950s and 1960s, the State Government purchased and subdivided much of the land for war service homes and public housing. During the postwar years the character of the district underwent a major change, from rural to suburban residential. The rapid development of North Ryde saw many of the older dwellings and buildings demolished.

After the war, the huts previously used by the army on the southern side of Blenheim Road were utilised as a migrant hostel and for Australian families in urgent need of accommodation due to the acute housing shortage.

A large pig farm was located at the northern end of Wicks Road and was operational until the late 1960s.

An outdoor theatre had operated in Khartoum Road for many years showing silent and then "talkie" movies and was known locally as "the Shack". Located on the corner of what is now Khartoum Road and Waterloo Roads, the Khartoum Theatre was an open-air theatre which opened on 29 January 1938, with the final movie shown in 1966 when it closed with Marlon Brando in "The Wild One". It had always been a popular haunt with locals and motorcyclists alike.

In 1956, the North Ryde Skyline Drive-In Theatre was opened on the southern corner of Waterloo and Lane Cove Roads, on land that was previously an orange orchard. It had capacity for 639 cars, a fully equipped restaurant with facilities which also housed the projection booths, and a large children's playground was located under the huge screen. It showed its final movies, Rocky IV and Conan The Destroyer, on 5 February 1986.

== Cox's Road ==
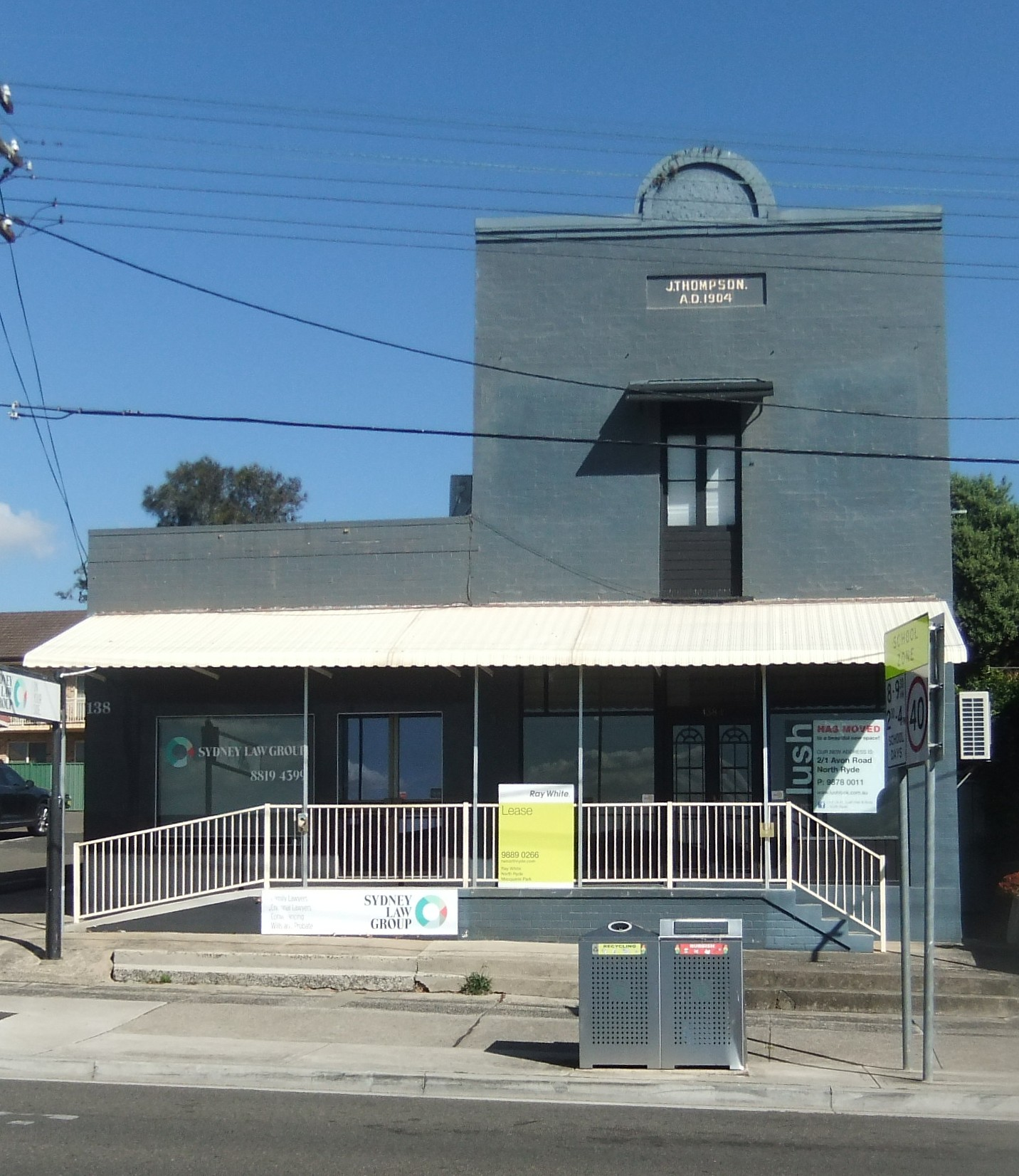
Thompson's Shop in Cox's Road was built in 1904.

North Ryde's main street is Cox's Road (the lower part of which was previously Coomassie Street). and was originally sandstone-lined to make it easier to haul goods up and down from the wharf on the Lane Cove River to the top of the hill. Cox's Road was named after Joseph Cox who owned land and lived in the area. Coxs Road was spelled with an apostrophe (Cox's) until recent times, though local street signs and Ryde Council still call it Cox's Road. The original North Ryde Post Office on Lane Cove Road was opened in 1885 and in 1908 was moved to Cox's Road, and has since relocated premises within the Cox's Road Shopping precinct at least six times. The North Ryde School of Arts and Literary Institute, built in 1901 on land donated by William Cox of Pomona, became the venue for the annual ball, community meetings, fetes, art exhibitions, dances and culture. Extensions were built in 1907 with the North Ryde Library Branch located here. Cox’s Road has 2 schools a Public and Catholic school, they are both primary schools.The original building was demolished in 1980 and a new Community Centre, School of Arts and Library complex was built.

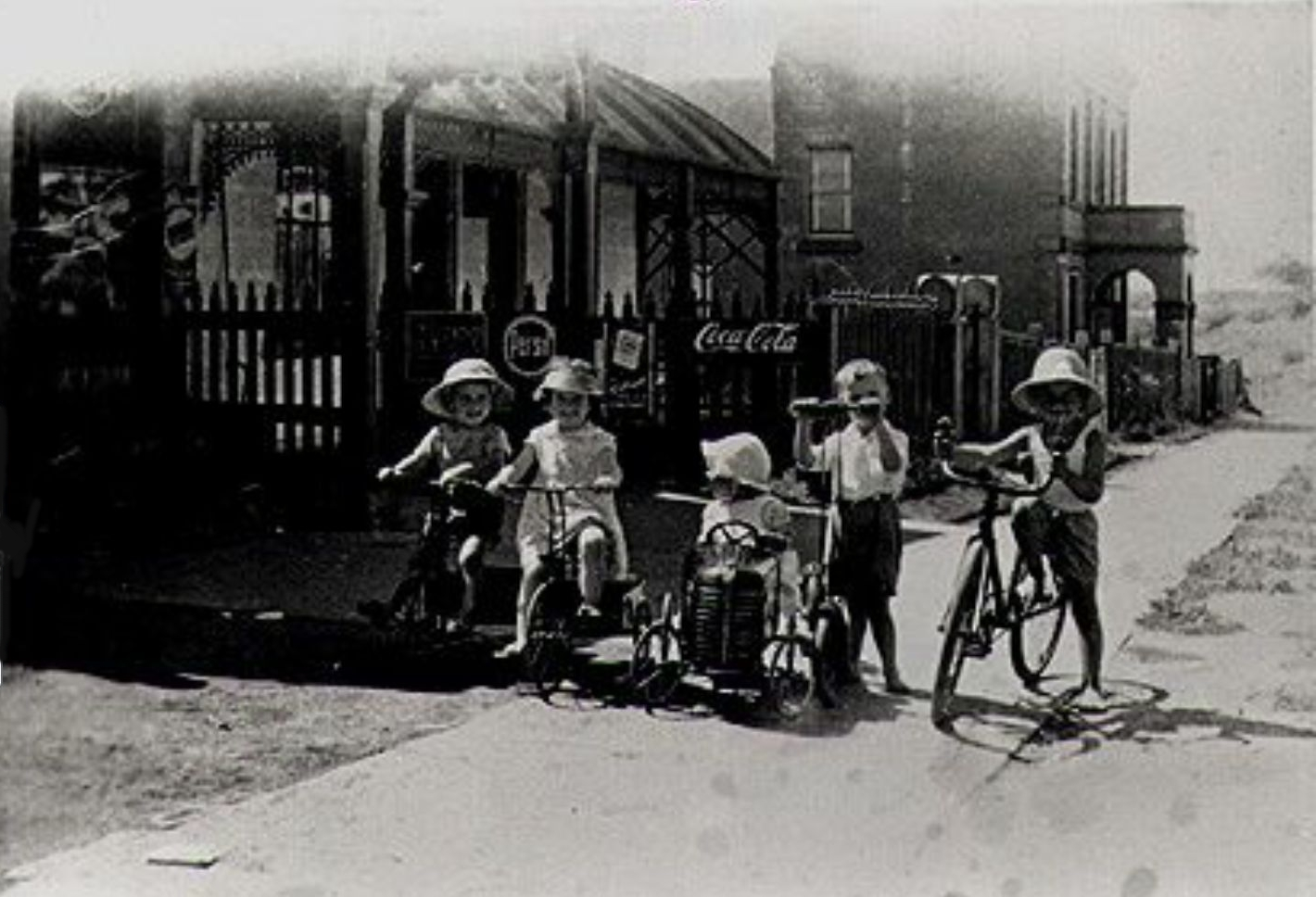
Children outside Horton's Shop in Cox's Road. The old School of Arts can be seen in the background. c.1943

J. Thompson's Shop (1904) in Cox's Road was the general store and post office for many years, and apart from the schoolhouse and a couple of heritage listed cottages nearby are the only remaining original buildings still standing from those early years. Three gas street lamps were installed in Cox's Road in the 1920s. One has been restored and is in front of the schoolhouse. The Cox's Road Shopping Centre was destroyed by a suspicious fire around 1990 and a new shopping mall was built with improved amenities.

== SMC Electric Lighting Substation No. 79 ==
With the electrification of the district the Sydney Municipal Council Electric Lighting Substation No. 79 located at 293 Pittwater Road, North Ryde, directly opposite North Ryde Park, was completed in 1916. However, it was never used for its intended purpose to supply the Ryde area with electricity and was simply used as a storehouse for many years. It has come to be known as "the electricity substation that never was". Now a heritage listed building, approval was given to redevelop the site into residential townhouses. The substation sits at the front of the site, with its full original S.M.C Electric Lighting Sub-Station signage still intact, with the newer developments towards the rear of the site.

== Population ==
In the 2021 census, there were 14,043 people in North Ryde. 49.7% of people were born in Australia; the next most common countries of birth included China (excluding Special Administrative Regions (SARs) and Taiwan) 9.6%, India 4.2%, South Korea 3.0%, Hong Kong (SAR of China) 2.6% and the Philippines 2.3%. 49.1% of people only spoke English at home; other languages spoken at home included Mandarin 11.4%, Cantonese 5.9%, Korean 3.6%, Armenian 3.0%, and Hindi 1.7%. The most common responses for religion included No Religion 35.1%, Catholic 22.2%, Anglican 7.2%, and Hinduism 4.2%; a further 7.1% of respondents for this area elected not to disclose their religious status.

== Commercial areas ==
North Ryde features many commercial and industrial developments. The Cox's Road Shopping Centre is a small shopping mall that features a supermarket, the post office, and specialty shops. The Public School, Community Centre, Library and School of Arts are all located nearby. Another commercial development is located opposite featuring a number of cafes, and eateries. Another row of shops is located in Blenheim Road, including the Adwill Place Arcade. There is also another row of shops in Avon road which feature hairdressing salons, a cafe and specialist health providers.

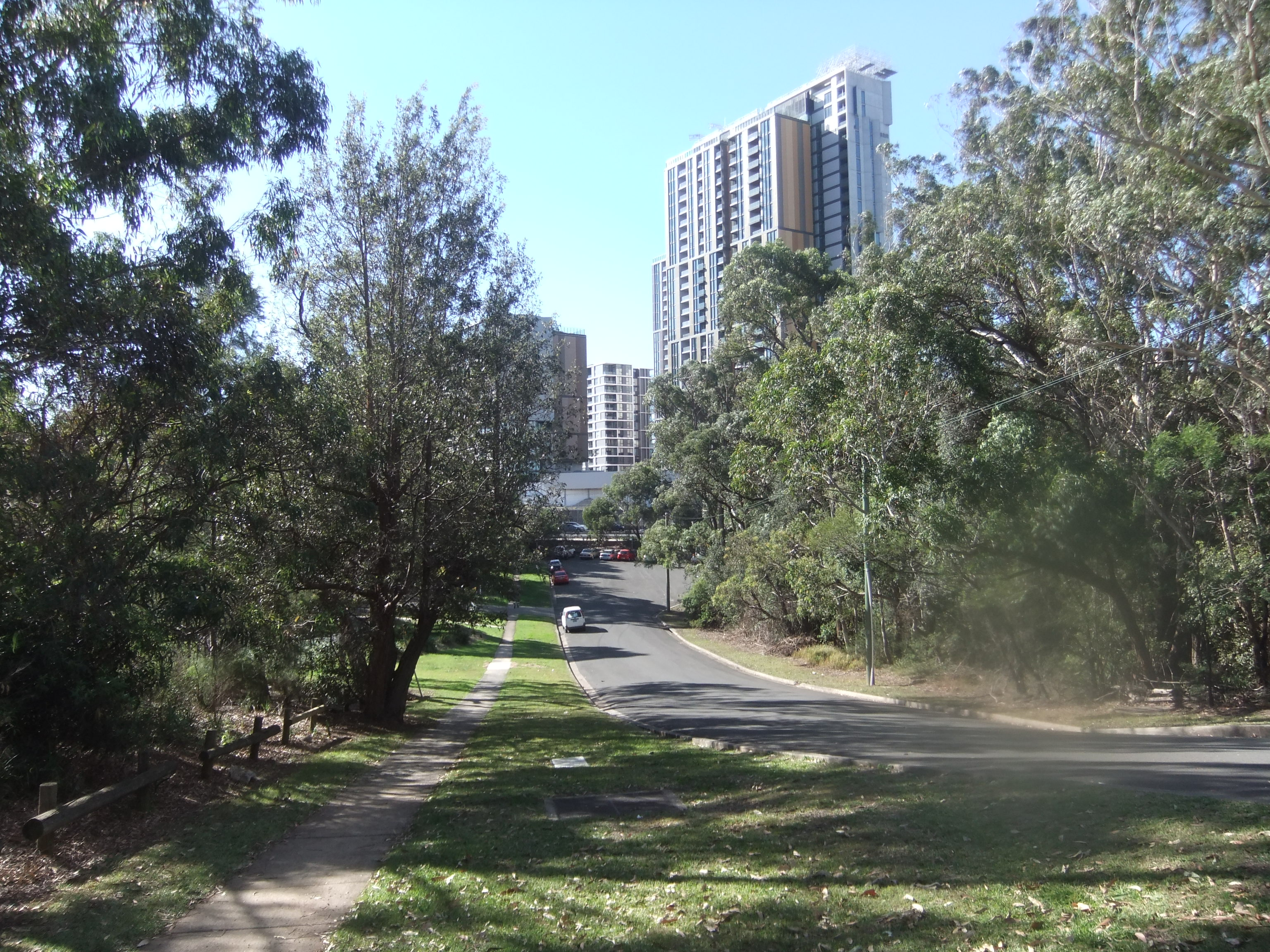
View from Blenheim Road of apartment towers on the former Channel 10 site

In 1961 the CSIRO Division of Food Preservation moved from Homebush to its new buildings at North Ryde. Although it has undergone several name changes since then, the division now located at 11 Julius Avenue in the Riverside Corporate Park. The mid-1960s saw the combined establishment of the North Ryde Industrial Area and Macquarie University to emulate the industrial areas surrounding and associated with Stanford University near San Francisco, California. Industries were originally limited to being "light", science related, and include research activities. The area has seen massive growth since the 1960s with the precincts in Macquarie Park and the Riverside Corporate Park now having the reputation as the leading high-tech industrial areas in Australia, attracting major information technology, communication, electronic, computing, scientific, medical, and pharmaceutical companies.

In 1994, Datacom Group opened its first office in Australia to expand its NZ-based services to Microsoft.

The neighbouring suburb of Macquarie Park, still considered a part of North Ryde, includes the regional shopping centre Macquarie Centre, Macquarie University, Sony, Foxtel, Optus, CA, Rexel Group Australia and many corporate headquarters.

Network 10 had its original headquarters and Sydney television production studios in North Ryde from 1965 until 1991, after which Global Television was located on the site until 2007. The site is now occupied by North Ryde railway station and apartment towers.

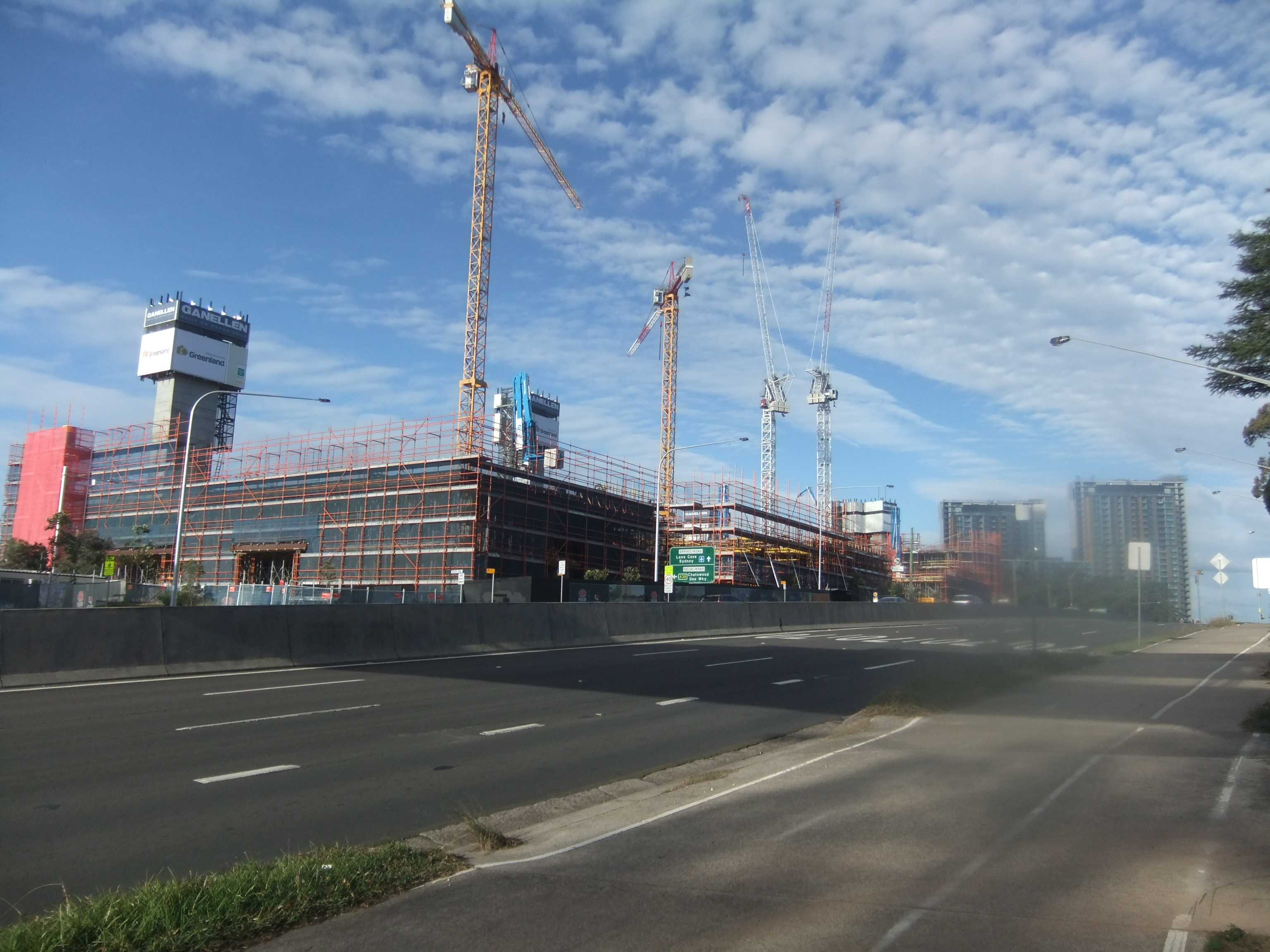
View from Epping Road of Lachlan Line apartment towers under construction in June 2018

== North Ryde Station Precinct Concept Plan ==
The North Ryde Station Precinct Concept Plan is a concept plan currently underway to determine the future of the areas in the vicinity of North Ryde railway station. On 4 December 2013 approval was given for the Development Control Plan (DCP) setting out vision, objectives and controls for future development of the North Ryde Station Precinct.

Construction began in 2015 and the Ryde Gardens apartment tower blocks on the old Channel 10 site, with access to North Ryde Railway Station, are occupied. The next stage of apartment towers, Lachlan's Line is also underway, with a pedestrian and cycleway bridge to be constructed over Delhi Road to give direct access to the North Ryde Railway Station.

== Schools ==
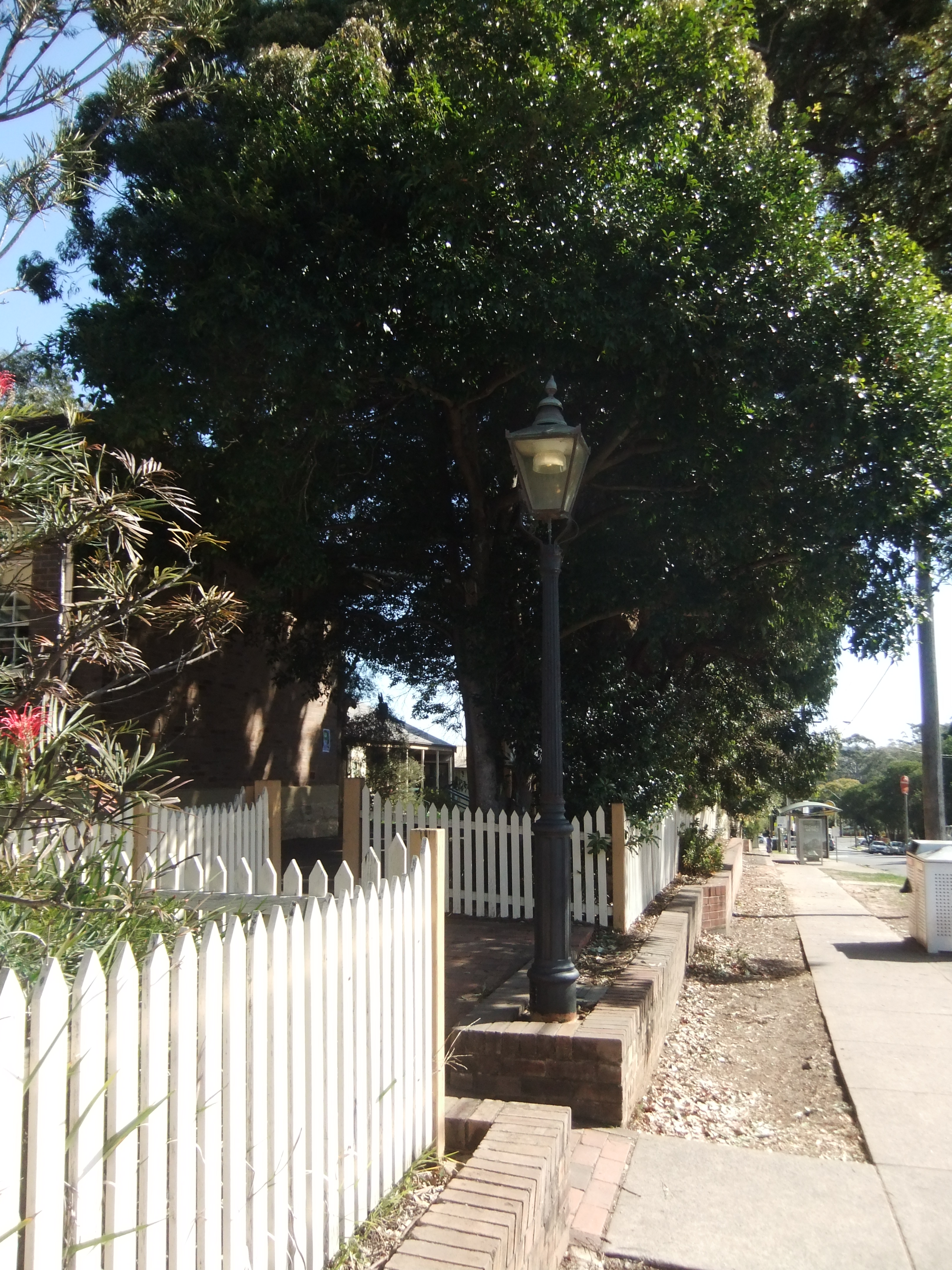
Old restored gas lamp at the schoolhouse in Cox's Road

The district's first public school, City View Public School, opened on 25 January 1878 with 45 pupils but changed its name to North Ryde Public School in 1879, which is the earliest reference to the name North Ryde. It was originally called City View as the city of Sydney was visible from the roof. The original building in Cox's Road is a brick and sandstone building built in 1877 on one acre of land donated by Richard Wicks which now houses the New South Wales Schoolhouse Museum of Public Education. It is one of the oldest school buildings in New South Wales.

A second primary school, Truscott Street Public School, opened on 21 May 1958 to cater for the children of WWII veterans. In 1988 the Truscott Street school incorporated a "Special Unit" for children with special needs.

A large and modern senior school, North Ryde High School, was built on land between Epping, Wicks and Waterloo Roads and opened in January 1962. It was later renamed Peter Board High School, which many residents felt took away its local identity. The school was subsequently phased out and closed in December 1998, demographics being used as justification for the decision. This move left North Ryde without a high school, with Ryde Secondary College being the nearest alternative.

A Catholic school, Holy Spirit Primary School, is located in Coxs Road, slightly further down from North Ryde Public School, on the opposite side of the road. Ryde East Primary School is located on Twin Road, with 350 students.

Arndell School is located in Badajoz Road on the Macquarie Hospital campus.

== Hospitals ==
=== Macquarie Hospital ===
The Macquarie Hospital is bounded by Cox's, Wicks, Twin and Badajoz Roads. The Hospital commenced functioning in 1959. It was originally known as the North Ryde Mental Asylum but has undergone several other name changes from North Ryde Psychiatric Centre to Gladesville-Macquarie Hospital, following an amalgamation of services with Gladesville Mental Hospital. Due to confusion caused by the inclusion of Gladesville in the Hospital's name, on 22 October 1999 notification was published that the Hospital was to be known as Macquarie Hospital. Macquarie Hospital is an important 195 bed specialist mental health facility offering acute admission, non-acute recovery and extended care programs for adults with a mental illness/disorder who reside within the Northern Sydney Central Coast Health catchment area. The hospital works collaboratively with a range of community mental health and specialist non-government organisations and has a catchment population of approximately 1,110,000 residents. The hospital is gazetted under the New South Wales Mental Health Act 1990. Macquarie Hospital is involved in a major planning project to develop an evidence-based service model for the future delivery of mental health services involving Northern Sydney and Central Coast catchment areas for the next ten years. This includes the development of a Procurement Feasibility Plan for a proposed Psychiatric Intensive Care Unit which may be developed on the Macquarie campus. New Horizons Enterprises, part of the Macquarie Hospital North Ryde Auxiliary, operates an acute aged care facility in Badajoz Road, on the site of the former New Horizons Service Station, with sheltered workshops and Head Office in Twin Road.

Arndell School, a special primary school for children with emotional and behavioural difficulties, is located on the Macquarie Hospital campus. The school works in partnership with the Coral Tree Family Service, a statewide child and family mental health service operated by Northern Sydney Local Health District that provides intensive family-based intervention for children with significant behavioural and emotional difficulties.

There are no emergency services at Macquarie Hospital. The nearest emergency departments are at Ryde Hospital, Concord Hospital, or Royal North Shore Hospital.

=== Macquarie University Hospital ===
The Macquarie University Hospital is a specialist private hospital that opened on 15 June 2010 located on the campus of Macquarie University. It is now the primary teaching hospital affiliated with the University's Australian School of Advanced Medicine. The hospital features some of the most advanced medical facilities in Australia, including the first gamma knife in Australia.

There are no emergency services at Macquarie University Hospital. The nearest emergency departments are at Ryde Hospital, Concord Hospital, or Royal North Shore Hospital.

== Cemeteries and crematoria ==
=== Field of Mars Cemetery ===
One of the oldest cemeteries in Sydney, the Field of Mars Cemetery in Quarry Road, Ryde, then part of the Field of Mars, was proclaimed on 3 December 1887, and opened in 1890. There are currently approximately 66000 people buried there.

=== Macquarie Park Cemetery and Crematorium ===
The Macquarie Park Cemetery and Crematorium, formerly known as the Northern Suburbs General Cemetery, opened in 1922 . The cemetery is situated on 59 hectares of Crown land on Delhi Road directly opposite the entrance to the underground metro North Ryde railway station. It was also originally part of the Field of Mars Common.

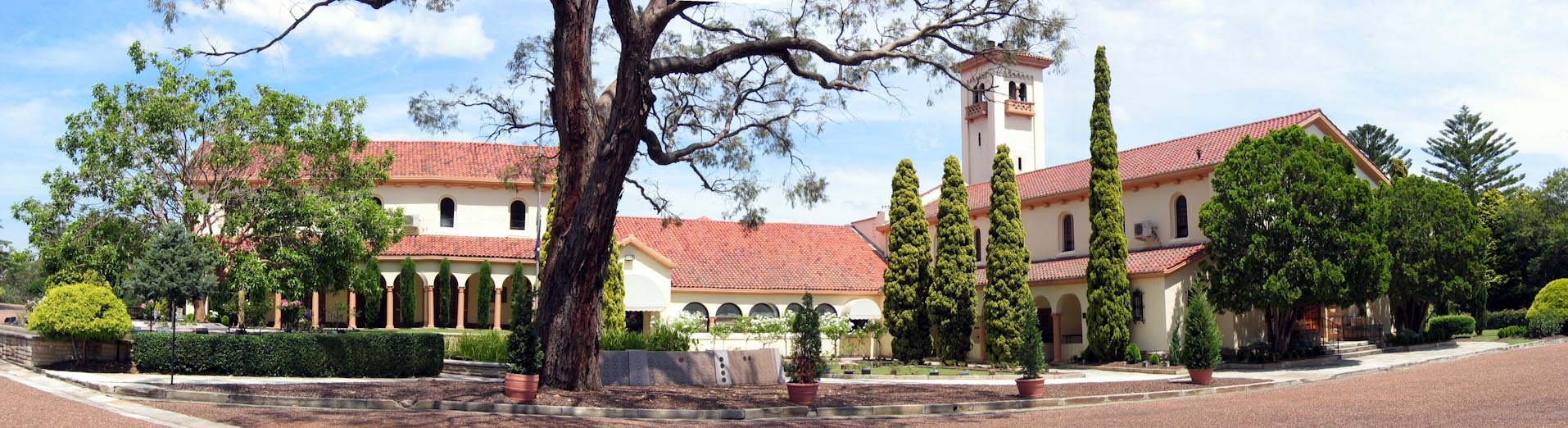
Macquarie Park Cemetery and Crematorium

=== Northern Suburbs Crematorium ===
The Northern Suburbs Crematorium on Delhi Road site at North Ryde was made available for development into a crematorium in December 1931. The crematorium was opened on 28 October 1933, and the first cremation took place two days later. Located at 199 Delhi Road, North Ryde, it is the second oldest crematorium in Sydney, after Rookwood.

== Transport ==
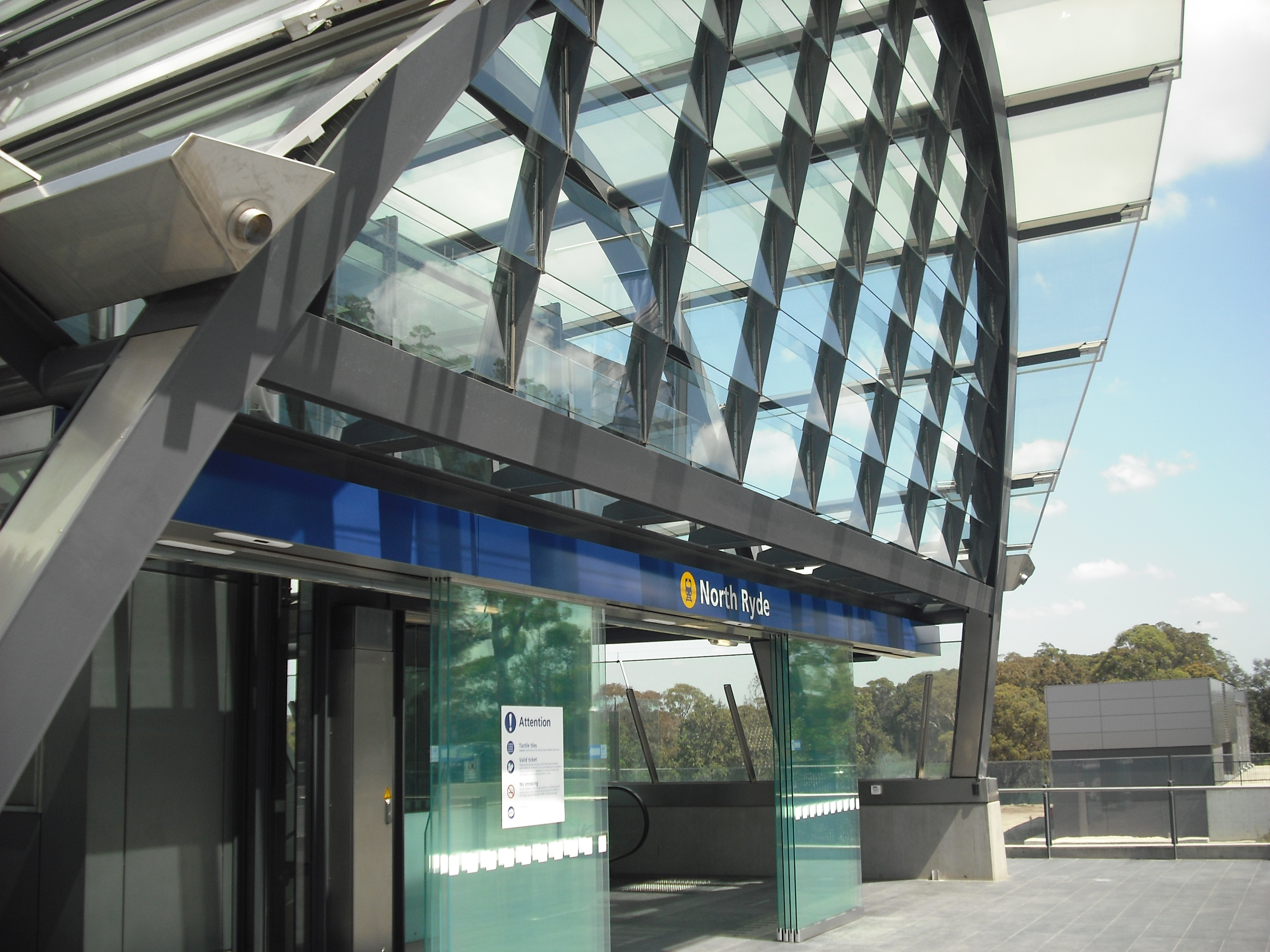
North Ryde railway station shortly after opening in 2009. Bushland can still be seen before the development of apartment towers.

The M2 Hills Motorway passes through North Ryde en route to the Lane Cove Tunnel motorway, and then the Gore Hill/Warringah Freeway, Sydney Harbour Bridge, and Sydney central business district. Lane Cove Road (A3), traverses North Ryde from north to south, linking Sydney's North Shore to Homebush Bay and Sydney Olympic Park. Epping Road runs west to east and crosses the Lane Cove River Bridge to link the City of Ryde to the Municipality of Lane Cove.

North Ryde is serviced by Busways bus services, primarily the routes 286-297, 506, and 533-535 which criss-cross the district. Private shuttle buses provide local and Sydney Airport services.

North Ryde railway station is an underground railway station on the Metro North West & Bankstown Line that opened on 29 February 2009. It is located close to the intersection of Epping Road and Delhi Road, near the M2 Motorway. North Ryde station closed in September 2018 for seven months for conversion to a Sydney Metro station on the Sydney Metro Northwest line, which included the installation of platform screen doors. It reopened 26 May 2019. It is serviced by automated Metro driverless trains terminating at Sydenham.

The area once known as North Ryde now has three underground railway stations, North Ryde, Macquarie Park, and Macquarie University.

== Parks and reserves ==
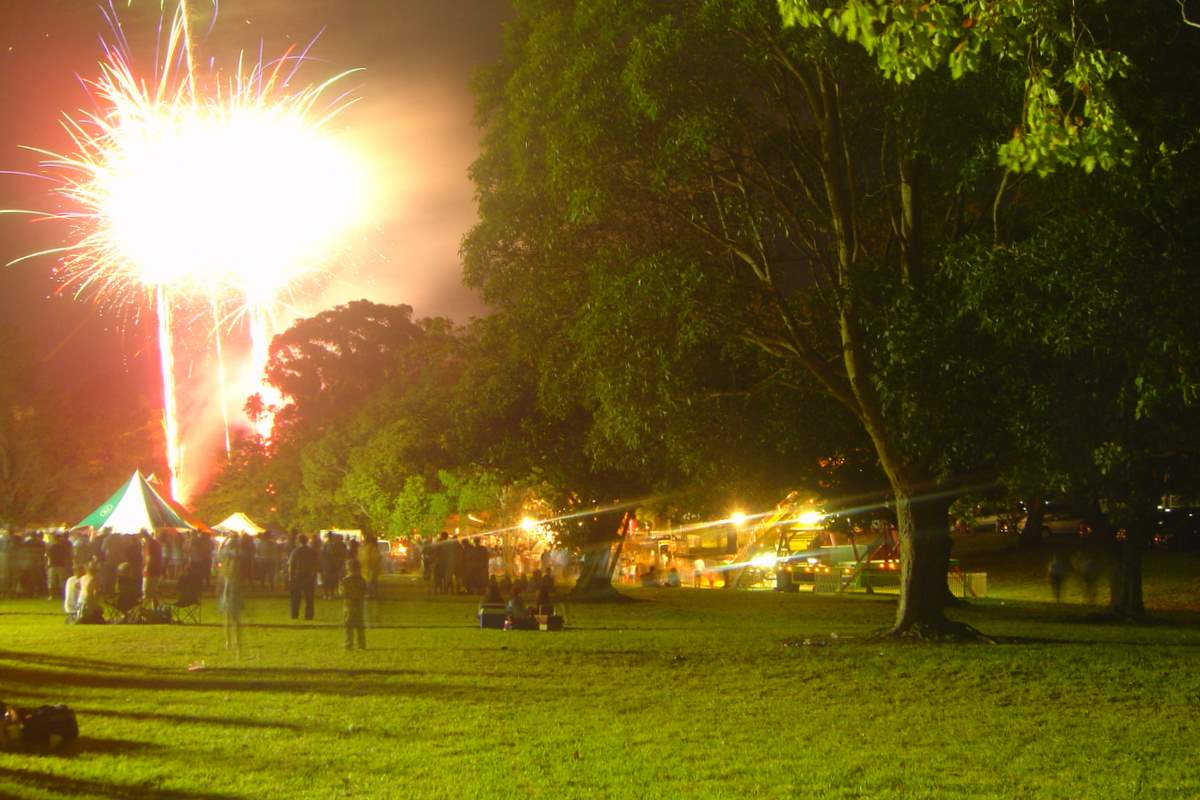
Fireworks at North Ryde Common

North Ryde has many parks and reserves, including North Ryde Common, and the adjacent Lane Cove National Park, the Field of Mars Reserve, and access to the Great North Walk and the Lane Cove River, once home to the Fairyland picnic grounds, when boatloads of people would come up the river from Sydney for the regular Saturday Dances. Today very little remains of Fairyland and it is almost completely overgrown.

North Ryde Park bounded by Cressy, Magdala and Pittwater Roads, features a sportsground and hosts cricket and soccer matches. The park received a major upgrade in 2009 with a fully refurbished amenities block, natural areas with barbeques and picnic areas, and a new children's play area and walking paths/cycleway.

Blenheim Park is the City of Ryde's premium multi-functional family park and features playground areas with a range of equipment suitable for all age groups, barbeques and picnic areas and shelters, an internal cycleway for kids, accessible toilet and a fenced off-leash area for dogs. NOTICE - Blenheim Park is temporarily CLOSED. In August 2024 the discovery of asbestos, hydrocarbons, and heavy metals within Blenheim Park was identified during testing in preparation for the implementation of the latest park upgrade and has resulted in the temporary closure of Blenheim Park until late 2026 / early 2027. Contact City of Ryde on 9952 8222 for more information

The Lane Cove River Tourist Park is a (paid/for a fee) caravan park nestled in a bush setting in the Lane Cove National Park, just a few minutes walk from the North Ryde underground railway station.

== Sport and recreation ==
- Macquarie University Theatre has winter programs of classical concerts and other performances, by invitation from the University Vice-Chancellor.
- North Ryde Golf Club is an 18-hole par 69 golf course, with quality dining, wedding and corporate function facilities. It was previously a site for motorcycle racing in the late 1920s.
- North Ryde RSL Community Club has various dining venues, live entertainment, gift shop and various sporting clubs.
- Australia Day Concerts and Carols by Candlelight are held each year at North Ryde Common, adjacent to Macquarie Hospital. The grounds are open now after the removal of the original hospitals gates and fences, leased to Ryde Council for 99-years.
- Ryde Hunters Hill Hockey Club is on the grounds of the former Peter Board High School has over a 50-year history in the area providing Field Hockey for Juniors, Women's and Men's.
- North Ryde Junior Rugby League Football Club (The Hawks) have been running for over 50 years. Their training ground is at ELS Hall and in 2009 they moved their home games to TG Millner Field when North Ryde RSL Club took over the running of the Eastwood Rugby Club facilities there.

== Politics ==
North Ryde is in the State of New South Wales electorates of Lane Cove and Ryde, and the Federal electorate of Division of Bennelong

== Gallery ==
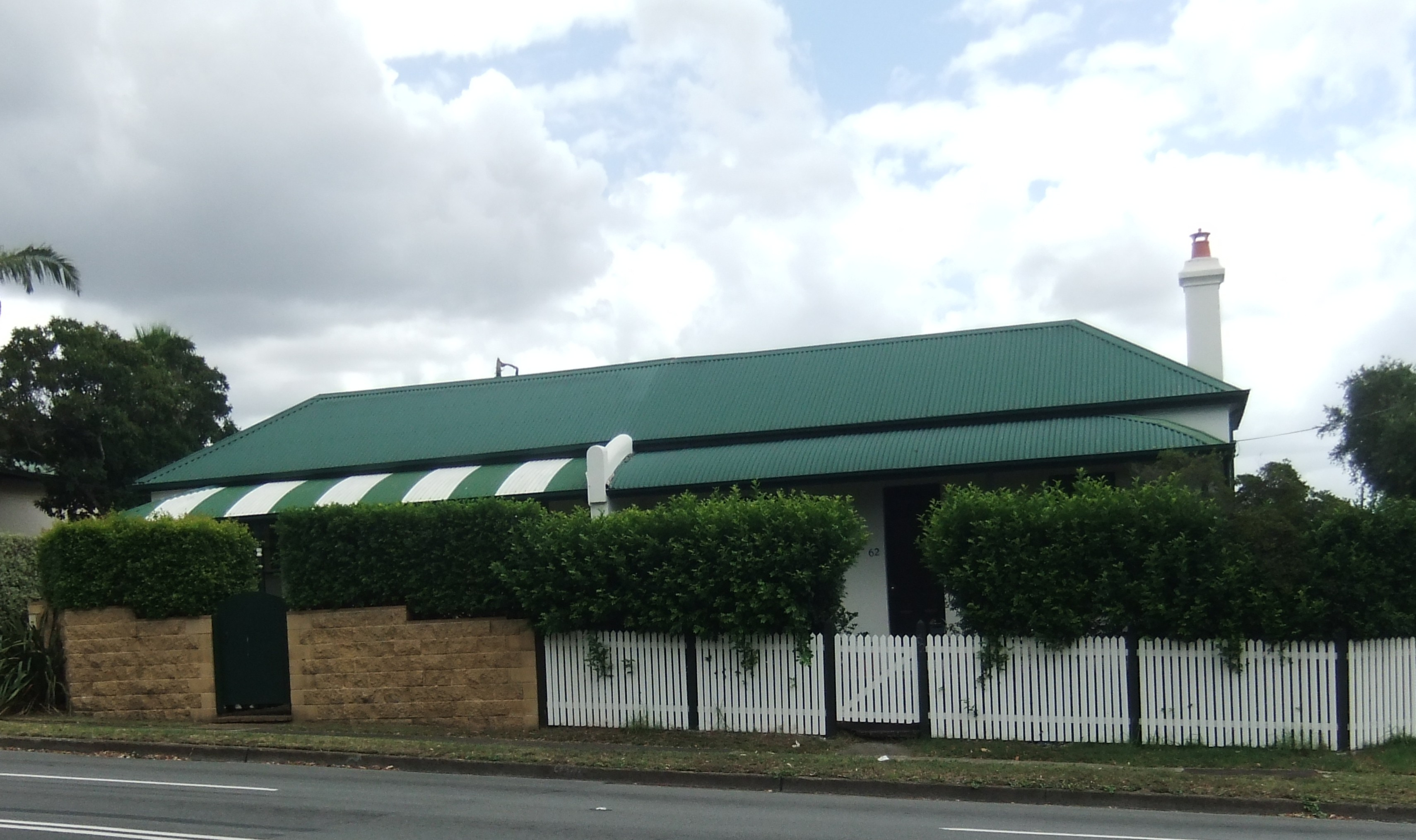
Heard's Cottages

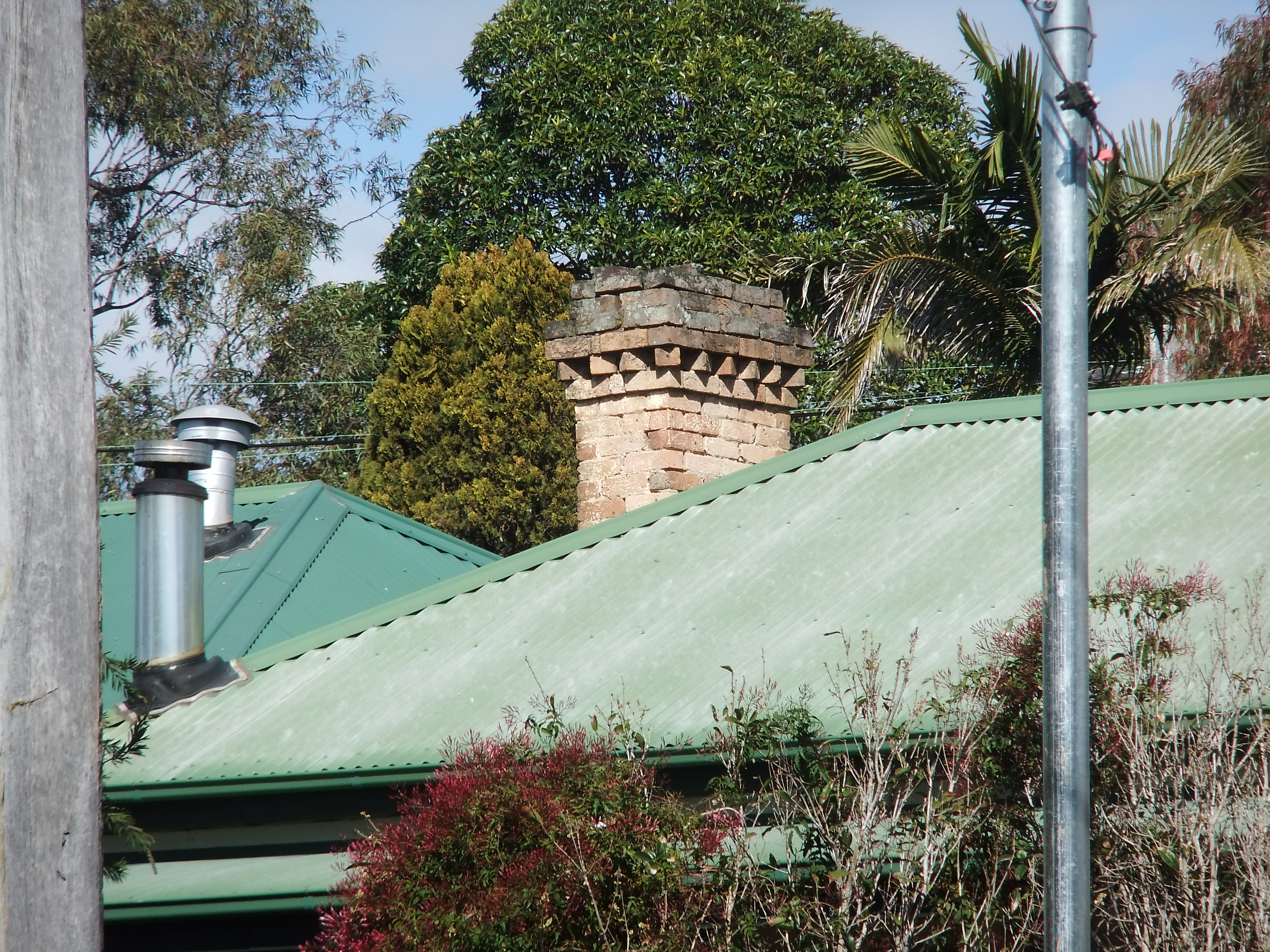
Heard's Cottage old chimney closeup

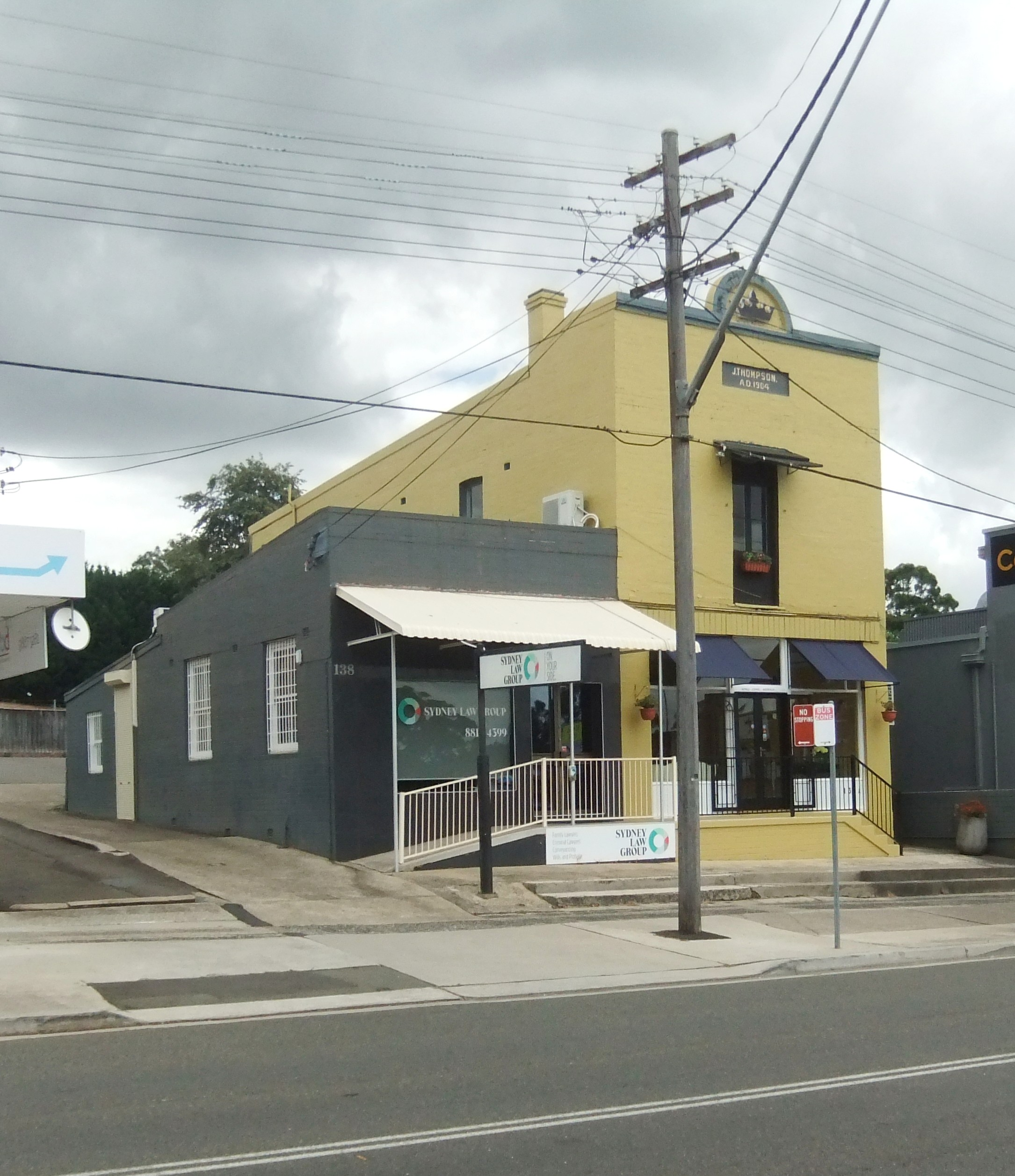
Thompson's Shop in March 2019

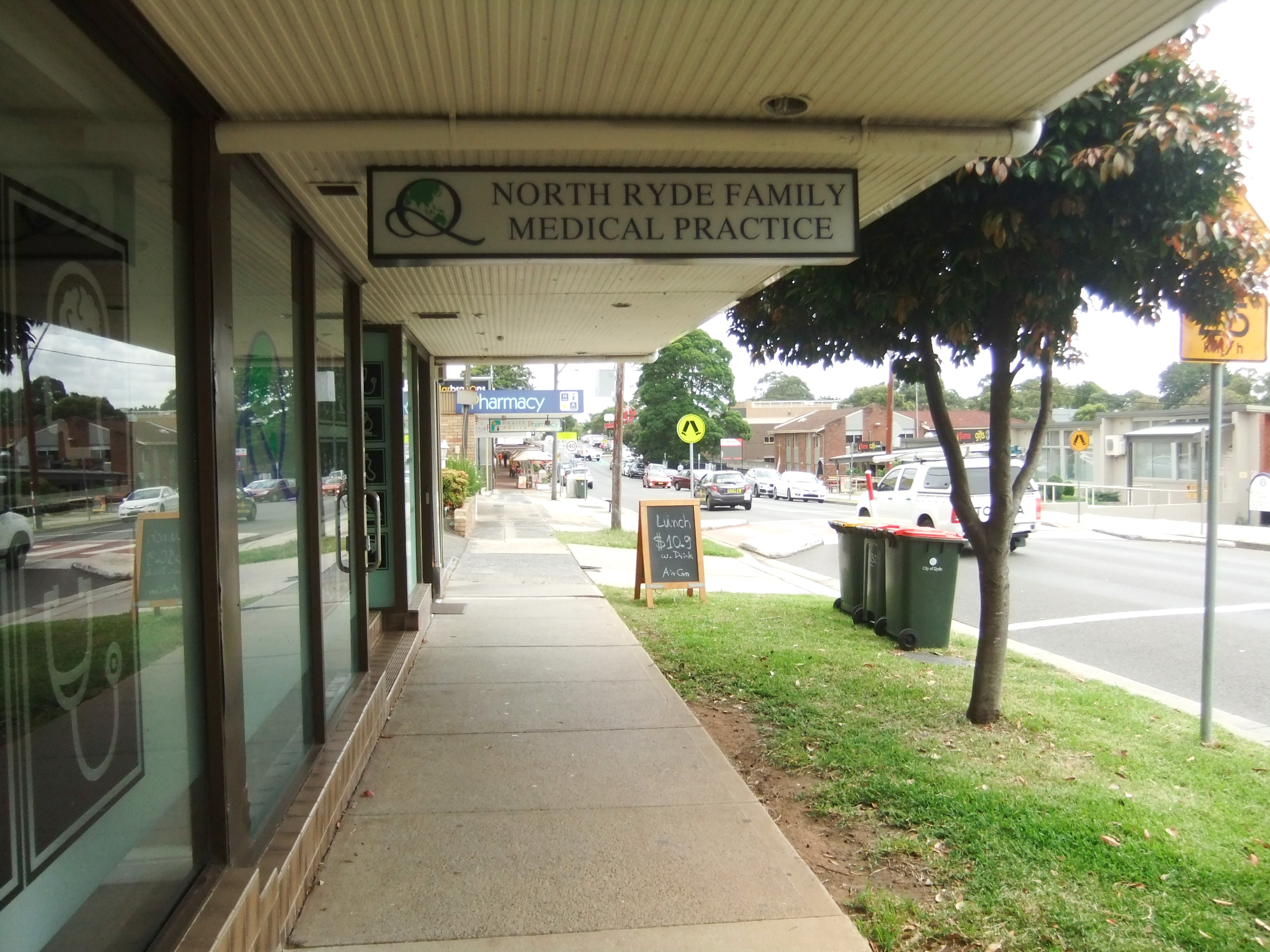
View of Cox's Road shopping precinct

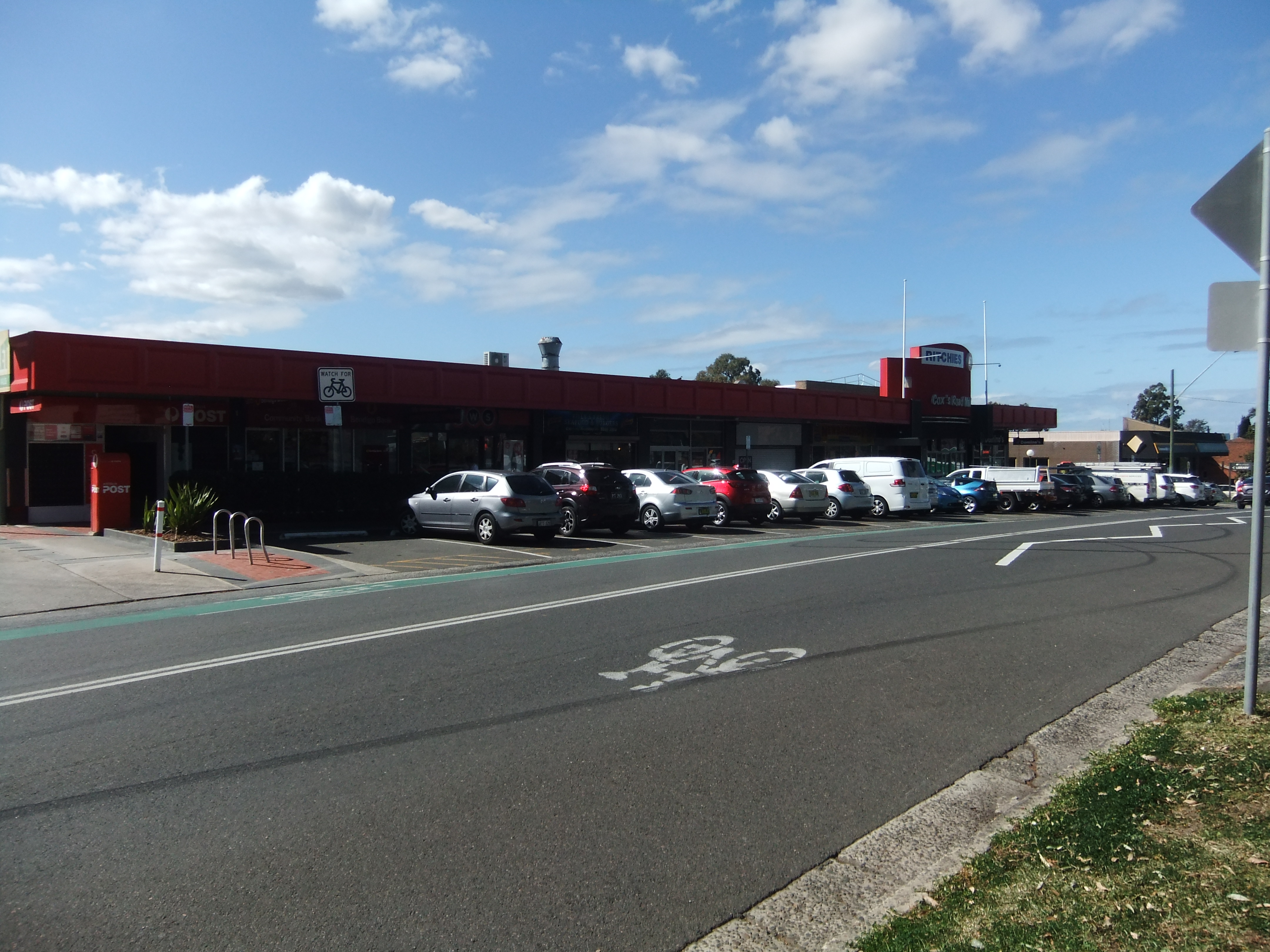
View of Cox's Road Mall

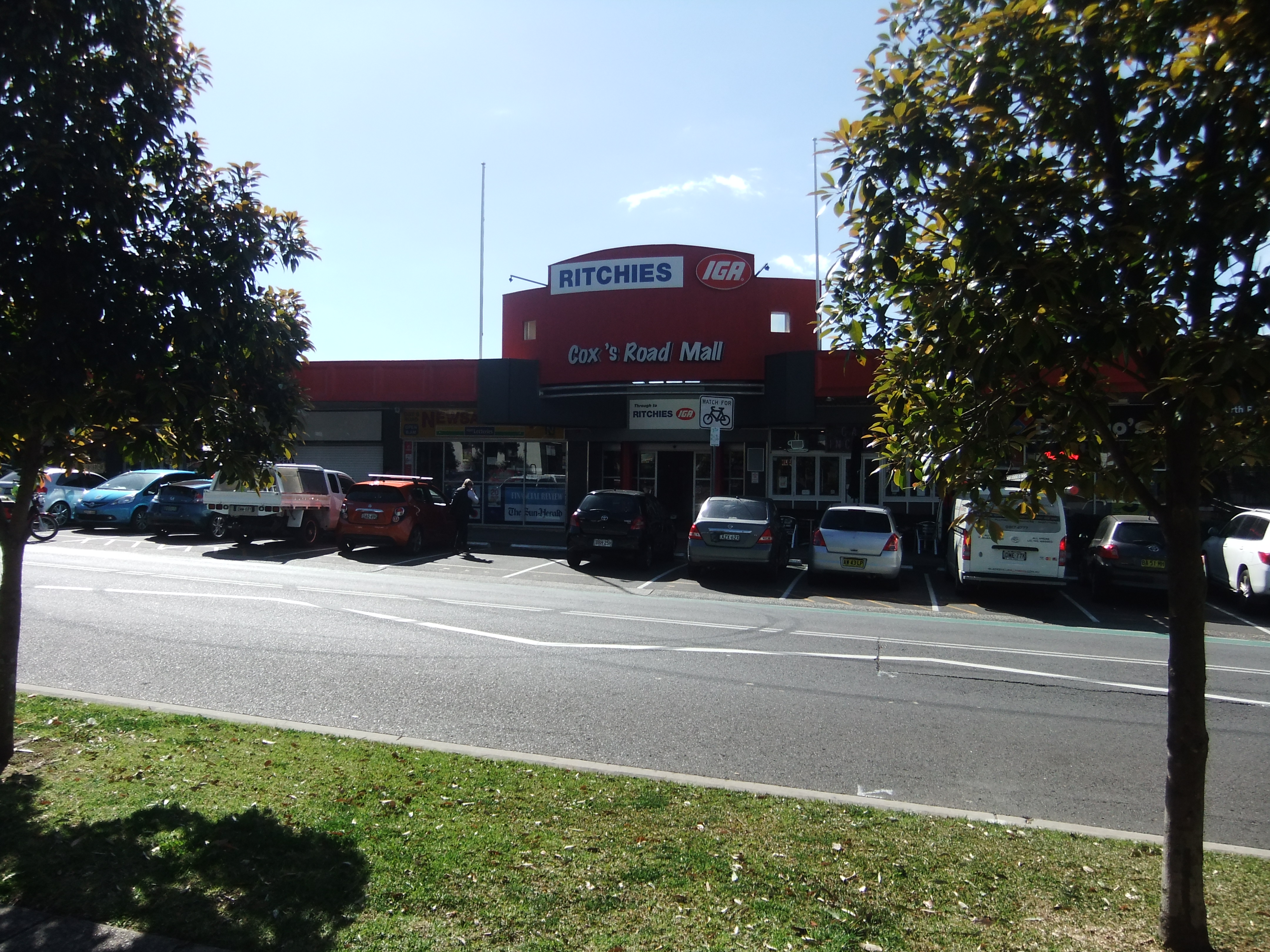
Main entrance to Cox's Rd Mall

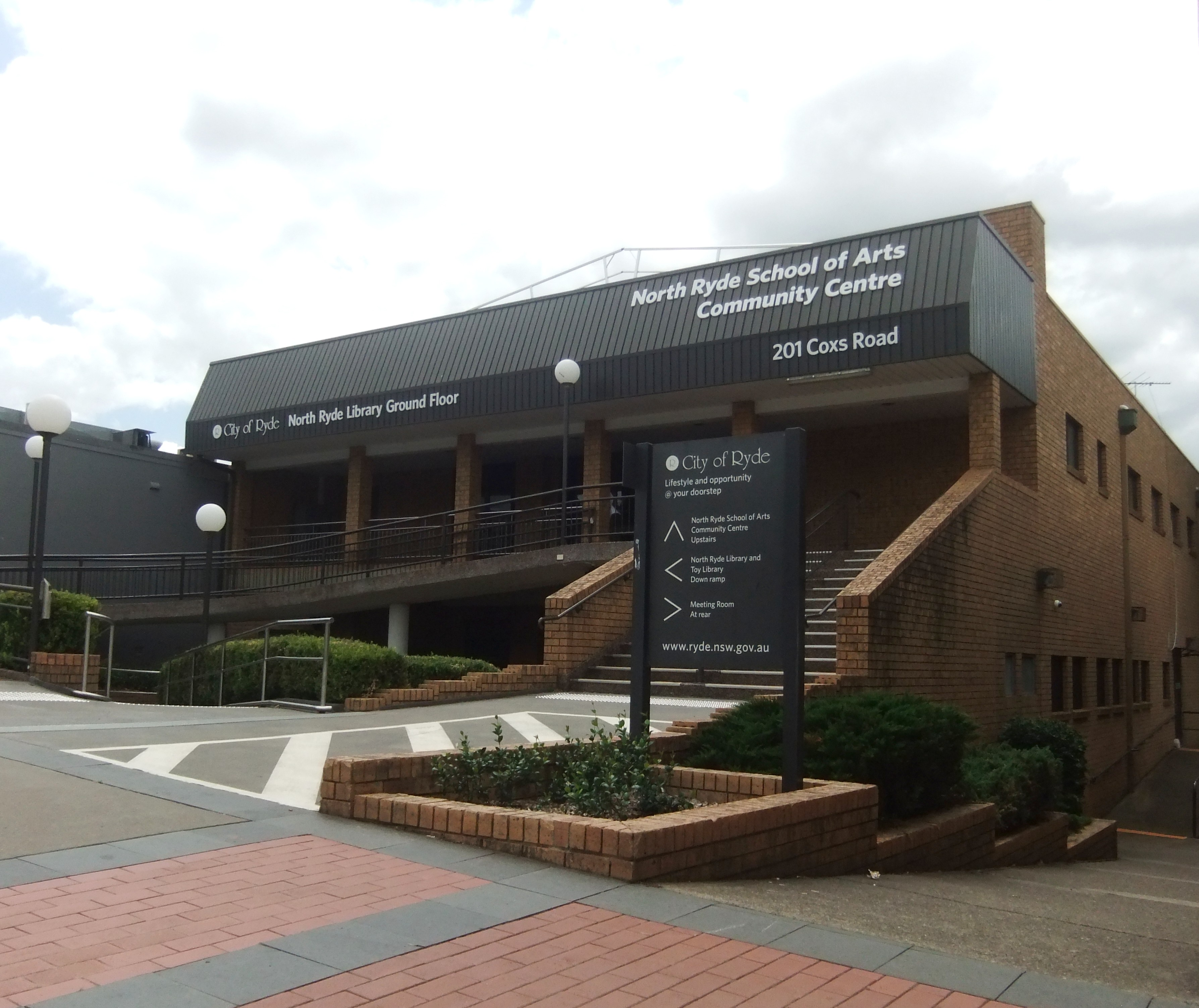
North Ryde Library and School of Arts Community Centre

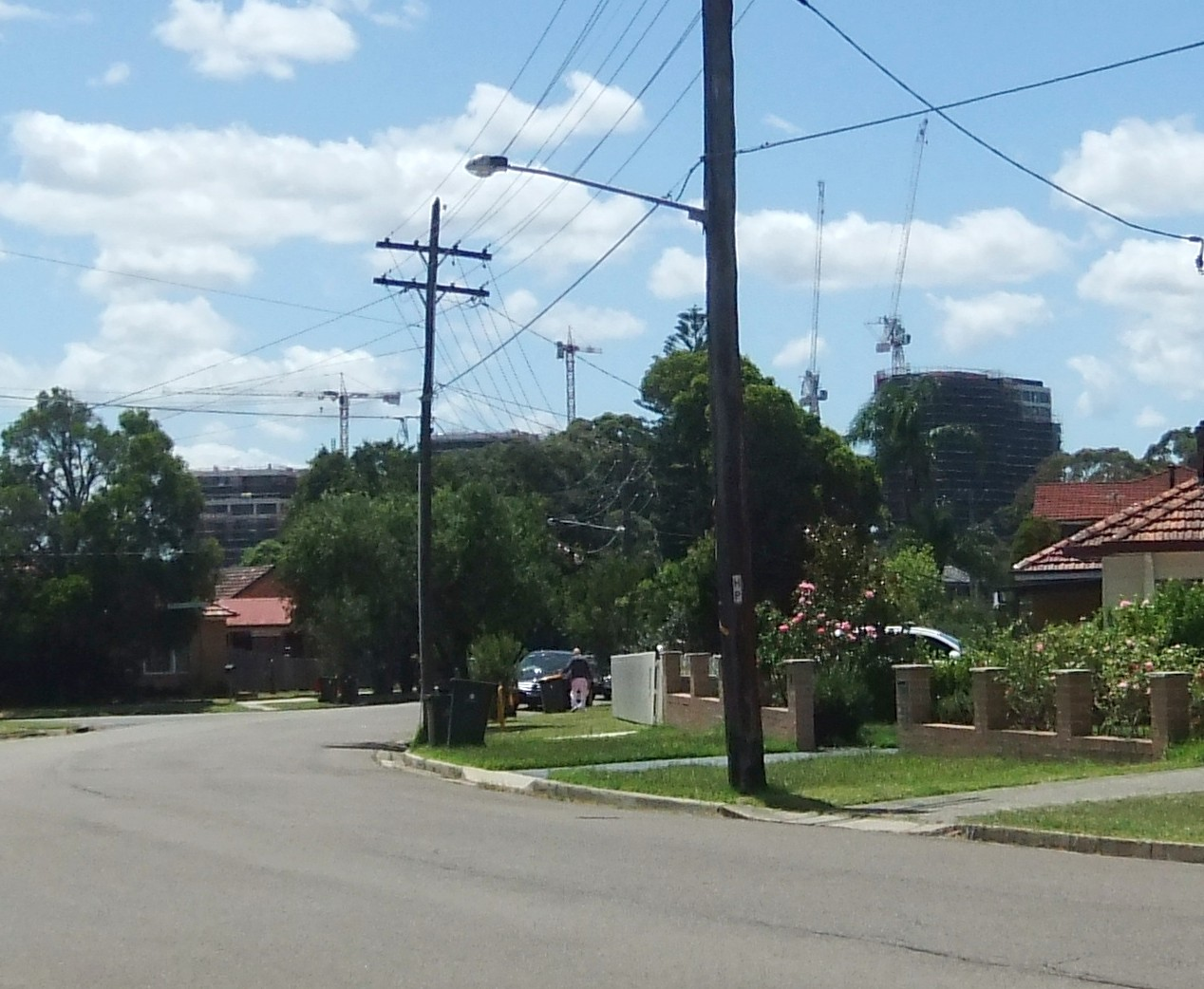
View of apartment towers under construction from Corner of Cutler and Chauvel Streets in March 2019

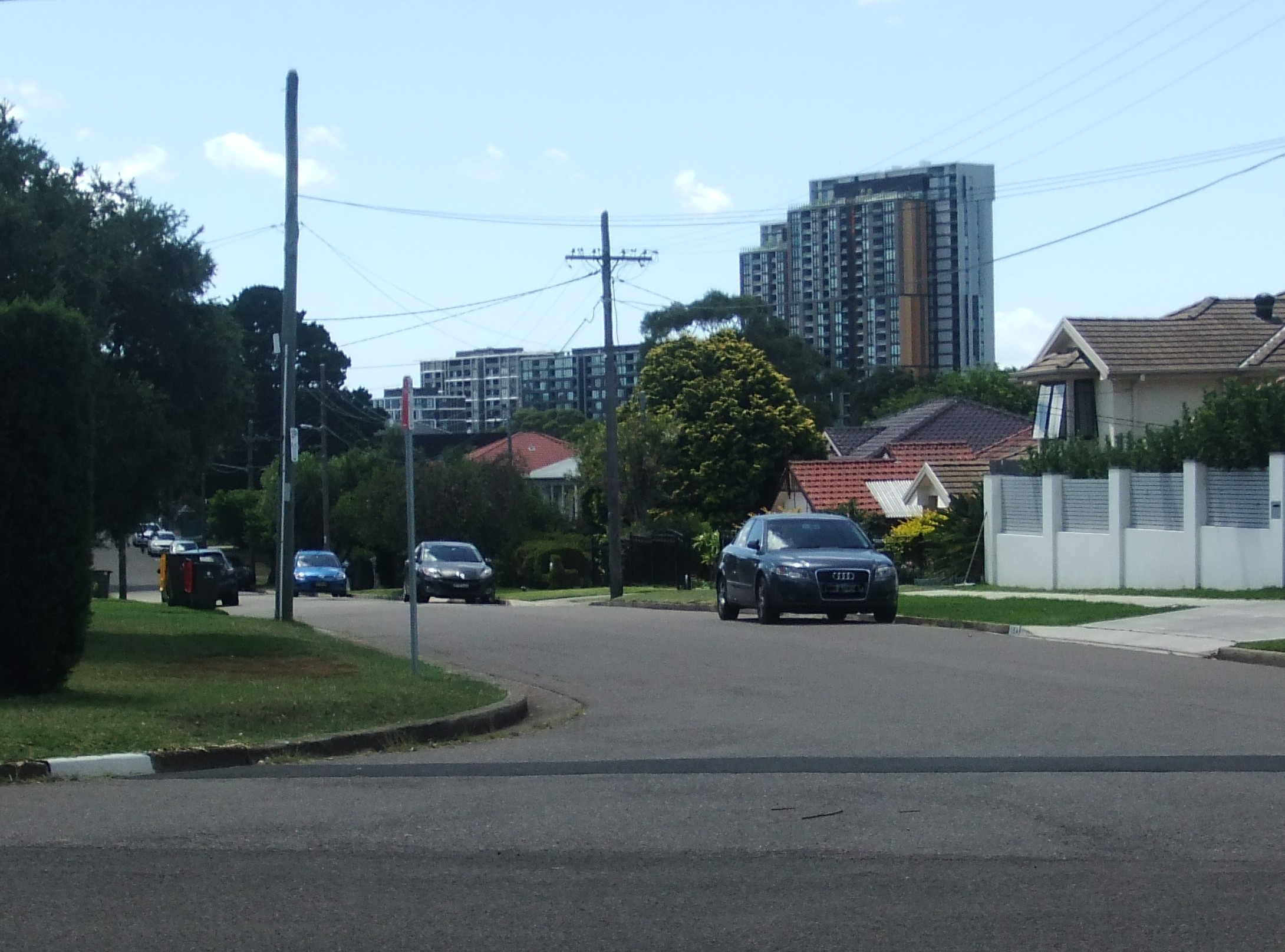
View from Cutler Parade of apartment towers on the former Channel 10 site

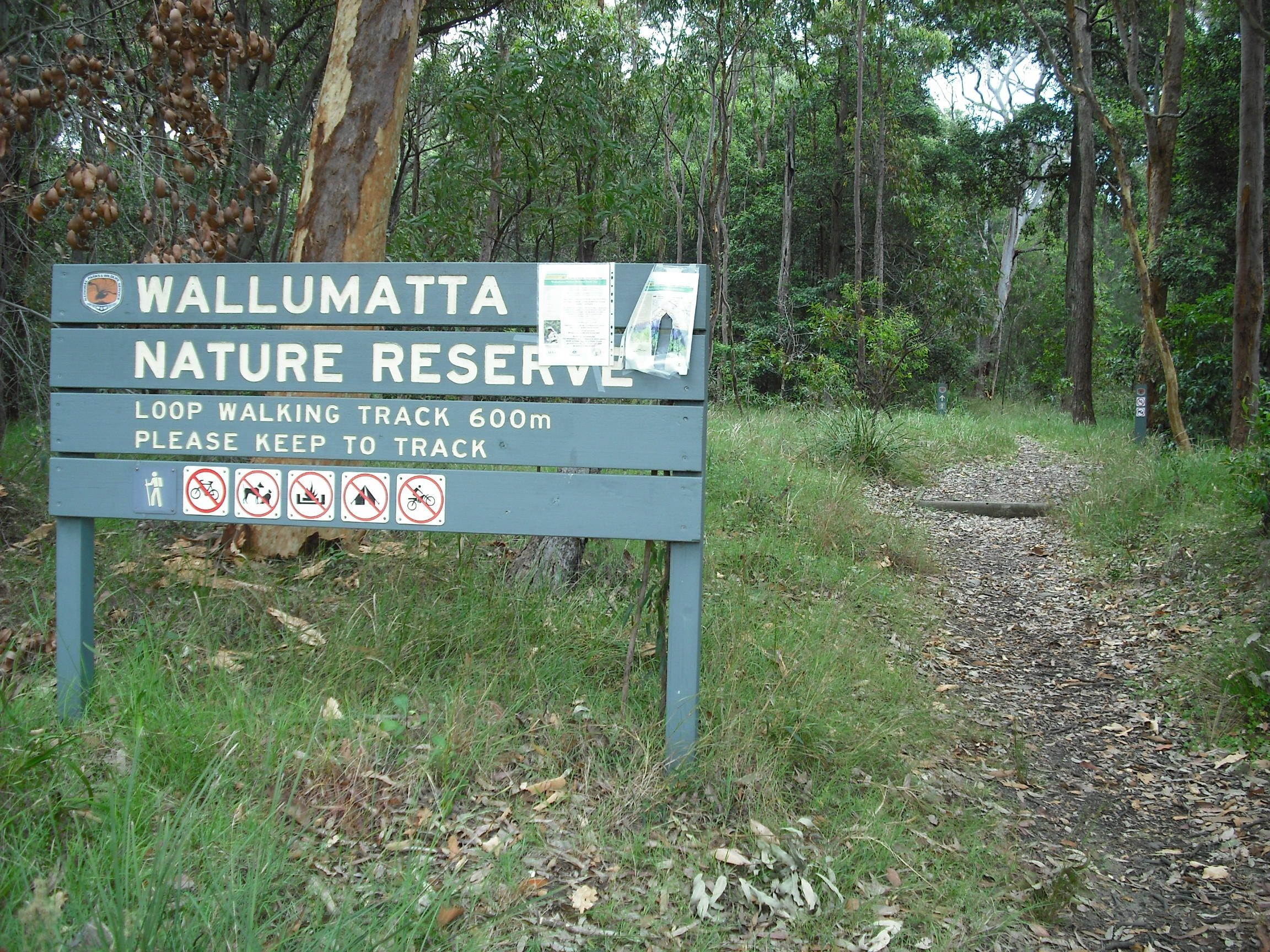
entrance to Wallumatta Nature Reserve

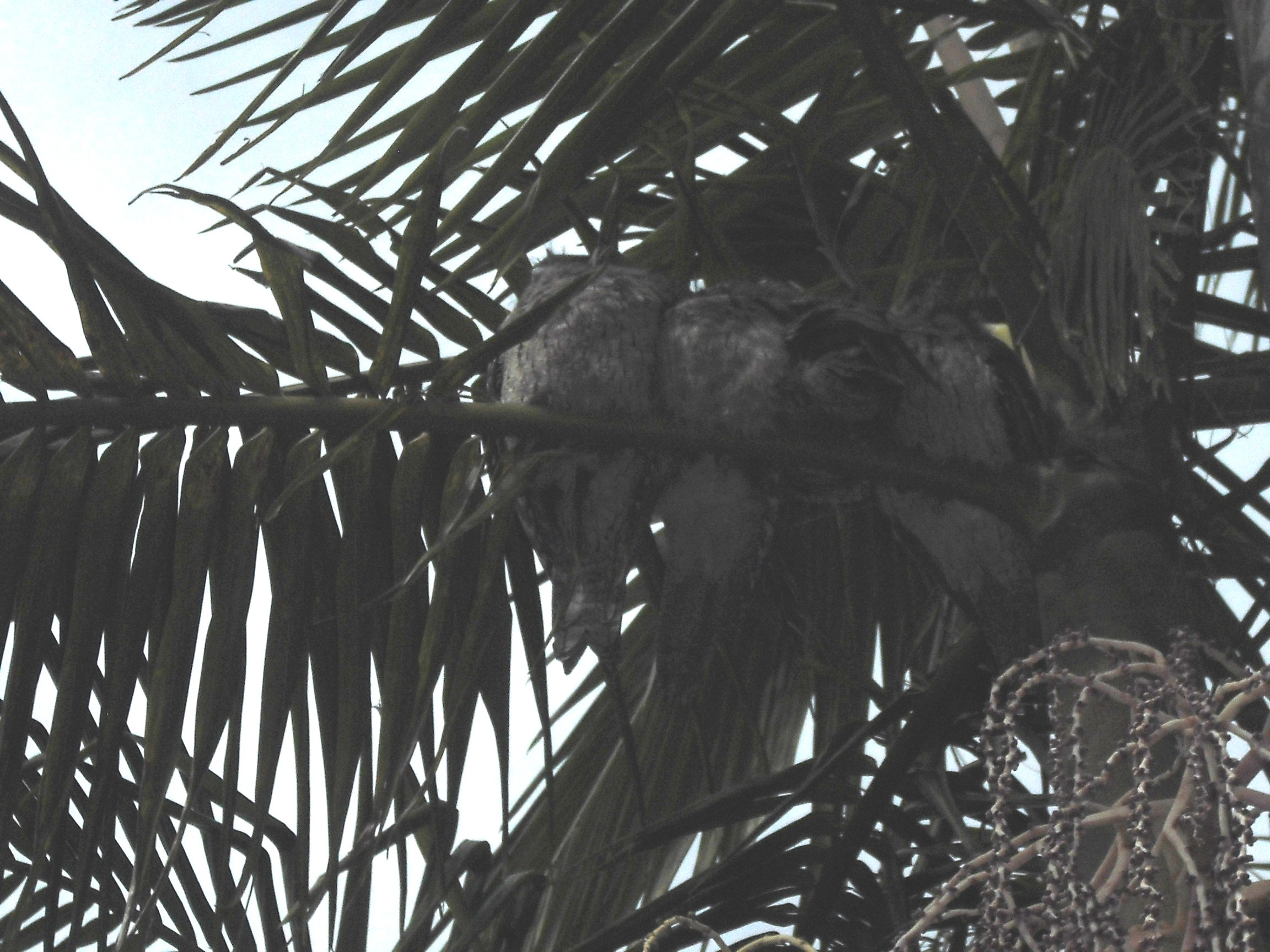
Group of four tawny frogmouths
