= Macquarie University railway station =

Sydney Metro railway station

Macquarie University
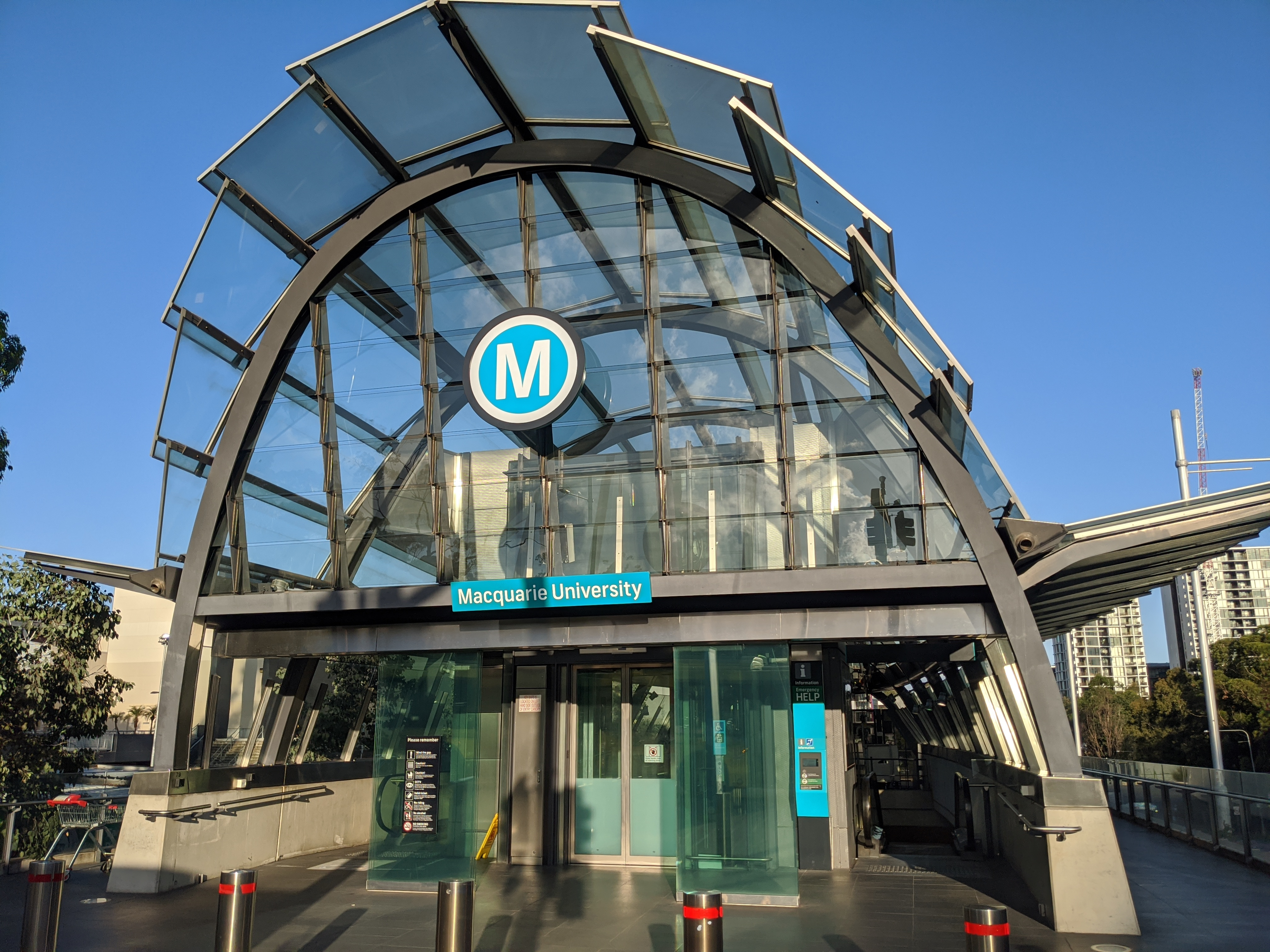
- Station entrance, April 2020

General information
- Location: Corner Herring & Waterloo Roads, Macquarie Park
- Coordinates: 33°46′38″S 151°07′05″E
- Owner: Transport Asset Manager of New South Wales
- Operator: Metro Trains Sydney
- Line: Metro North West & Bankstown Line
- Platforms: 2 (1 island)
- Tracks: 2
- Connections: Bus

Construction
- Structure type: Underground
- Accessible: Yes

Other information
- Status: Staffed

History
- Opened: 23 February 2009
- Rebuilt: 2018/19

Passengers
- 2023: 6,300,080 (year); 17,260 (daily) (Sydney Metro)

Services
Preceding station	Sydney Metro	Following station
Epping towards Tallawong	M1 Metro North West & Bankstown Line	Macquarie Park towards Bankstown
Other services
Former services
Preceding station	Sydney Trains	Following station
Epping towards Hornsby	T1 North Shore & Western Line Strathfield via Chatswood and Central (2009–2018)	Macquarie Park towards Strathfield
Location

Macquarie University railway station is a Sydney Metro station located on the Metro North West & Bankstown Line, serving the Sydney suburb of Macquarie Park including the nearby Macquarie University and Macquarie Centre, as well as parts of the suburb of Marsfield. It was formerly part of Sydney Trains' T1 Northern Line, before being converted to metro use as part of the Sydney Metro network.

== History ==
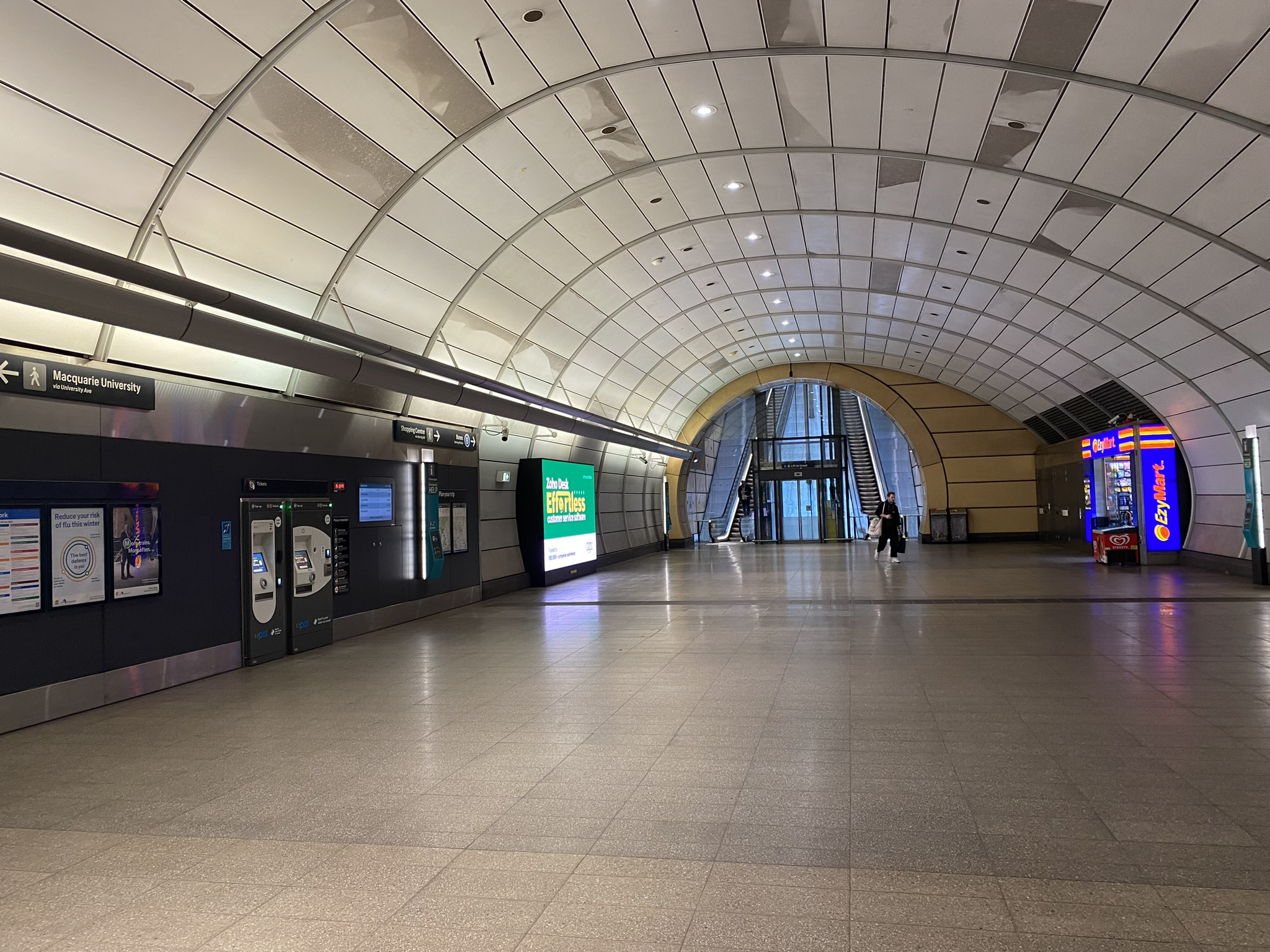
Main concourse, 2024

Macquarie University station opened on 23 February 2009 on the same date as the Chatswood to Epping line.

Macquarie University station closed in September 2018 for seven months for conversion to a Sydney Metro station on as part of the Sydney Metro Northwest project, which included the installation of platform screen doors. It reopened on 26 May 2019.

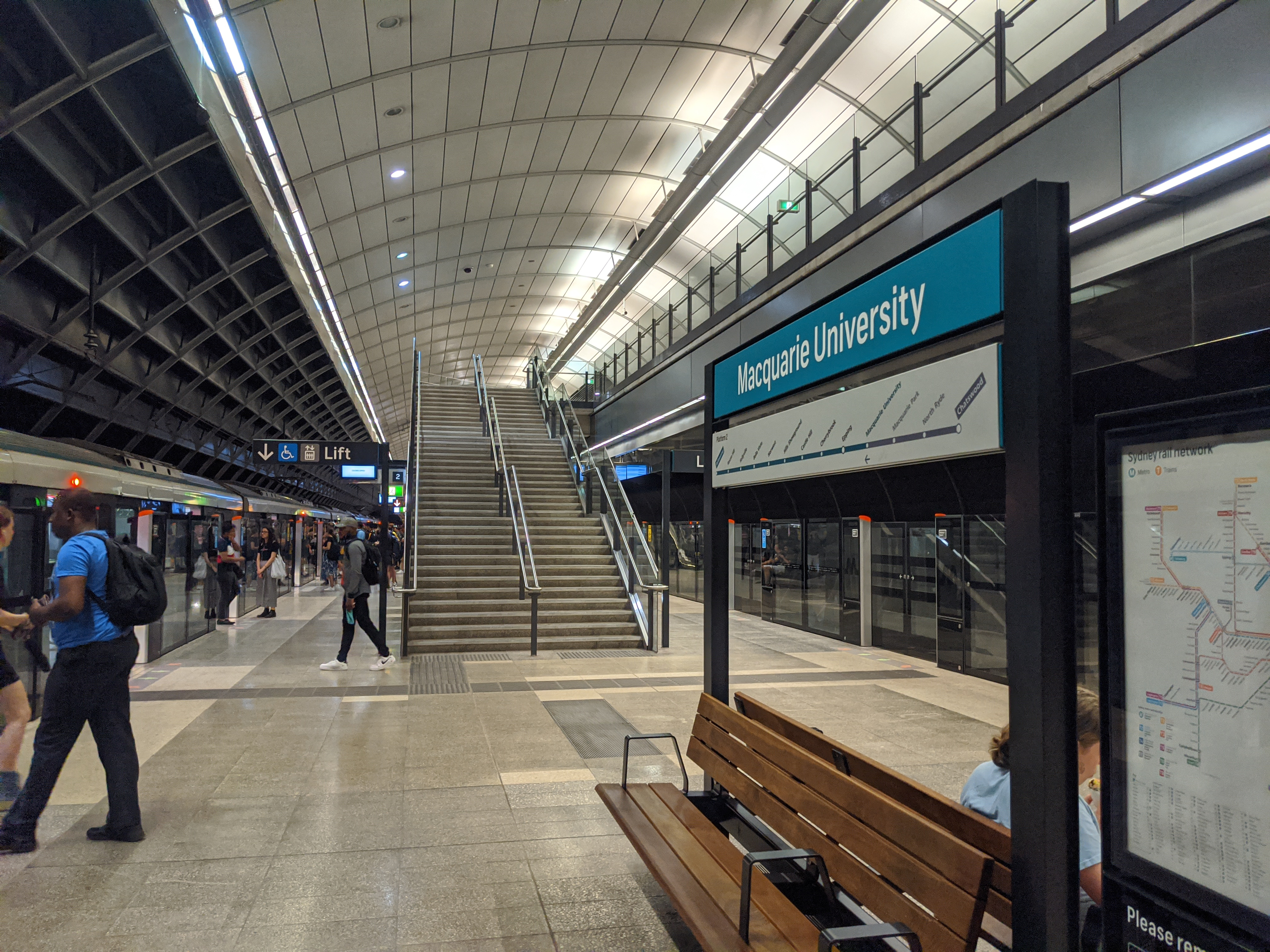
Platforms

== Services ==
Platform	Line	Stopping pattern	Notes
1	M1 Metro North West & Bankstown Line	Services to Bankstown	
2	M1 Metro North West & Bankstown Line	Services to Tallawong	

Macquarie University station is served by bus routes operated by Busways, CDC NSW and Transit Systems.

Bus stops for Hillsbus routes and Transit Systems route 410 are located outside the station entrance. All other services stop at the nearby Macquarie Centre.

External image
- Macquarie University Bus Guide by Transport for NSW
