= Arndell School =

Coordinates: 33°48′15″S 151°07′33″E

- North Ryde, New South Wales; Australia

Information
- School type: Public, co-educational, special school
- Grades: K–6
- Gender: Co-educational
- Age: 4.5 to 12
- Colours: Maroon and white
- Website: https://arndell-s.schools.nsw.gov.au/

Arndell School is a specialised school funded by the NSW Department of Education for students with emotional and behavioural difficulties. It works in partnership with Coral Tree Family Service and is located in the Macquarie Hospital grounds in North Ryde.

The school provides educational programs with an emphasis on literacy and numeracy for a maximum of 35 students aged from 4.5 to 12 years (K to Year 6). Five classes operate at the school.
