= Coral Tree Family Service =

Geography
- Location: North Ryde, Sydney, New South Wales, Australia

Organisation
- Type: Specialist child and family mental health service
- Network: NSW Health

Links
- Website: nslhd.health.nsw.gov.au/coraltree
- Lists: Hospitals in Australia

Coral Tree Family Service is a specialist child and family mental health service located on the campus of Macquarie Hospital in North Ryde, Sydney, Australia. It operates within Northern Sydney Local Health District as part of NSW Health. The service provides inpatient family interventions for children aged 12 years and under with complex behavioural, emotional and mental health difficulties.

== History ==
The service was established in 1959 as the Children’s Unit at North Ryde Psychiatric Centre.. During the 1960s it was renamed as the Arndell Children’s Unit. In its early decades the unit operated as a traditional child inpatient psychiatric service.

During the early 1990s the unit underwent a series of reforms that shifted the model of care toward family-focused residential intervention. An internal review of the Arndell Children’s and Family Unit conducted in 1998 by NSW Health and the Department of Education and Training recommended that the service be reorganised to operate as both a local and statewide resource. In the early 2000's, the service was renamed Coral Tree Family Service.

== Programs ==
Coral Tree Family Service operates two main programs - the Family Residential Program and the Clinical School Program.

The Family Residential Program involves planned short-term inpatient stays, typically of four nights, during which children and their parents or caregivers reside on site and participate in a structured therapeutic intervention. The model integrates parent management training and systemic therapy approaches within a residential setting, with a focus on strengthening family functioning and supporting parents to manage complex behavioural and emotional difficulties.

The Clinical School Program operates in partnership with Arndell School, a School for Specific Purposes within the New South Wales Department of Education that is co-located on the Macquarie Hospital campus. Children enrolled in the program attend Arndell School while receiving therapeutic support from clinicians at Coral Tree Family Service. Placements are time-limited, typically lasting up to 12 months, and are intended for students experiencing significant behavioural and emotional difficulties. The program integrates educational and therapeutic support with the aim of stabilising students’ functioning and supporting their transition back to mainstream schooling.

== Research ==
A 2023 longitudinal study of 493 families reported statistically significant improvements in family functioning following participation in Coral Tree’s Family Residential Program, with improvements maintained at 13-week follow-up.

A 2015 study examining students attending Arndell School as part of the Clinical School Program reports improvements in students’ behavioural, emotional and social functioning during their placement.

== See also ==
- Arndell School
- NSW Health
- Rivendell Child, Adolescent and Family Unit
