= Macquarie Park railway station =

Sydney Metro railway station

Macquarie Park
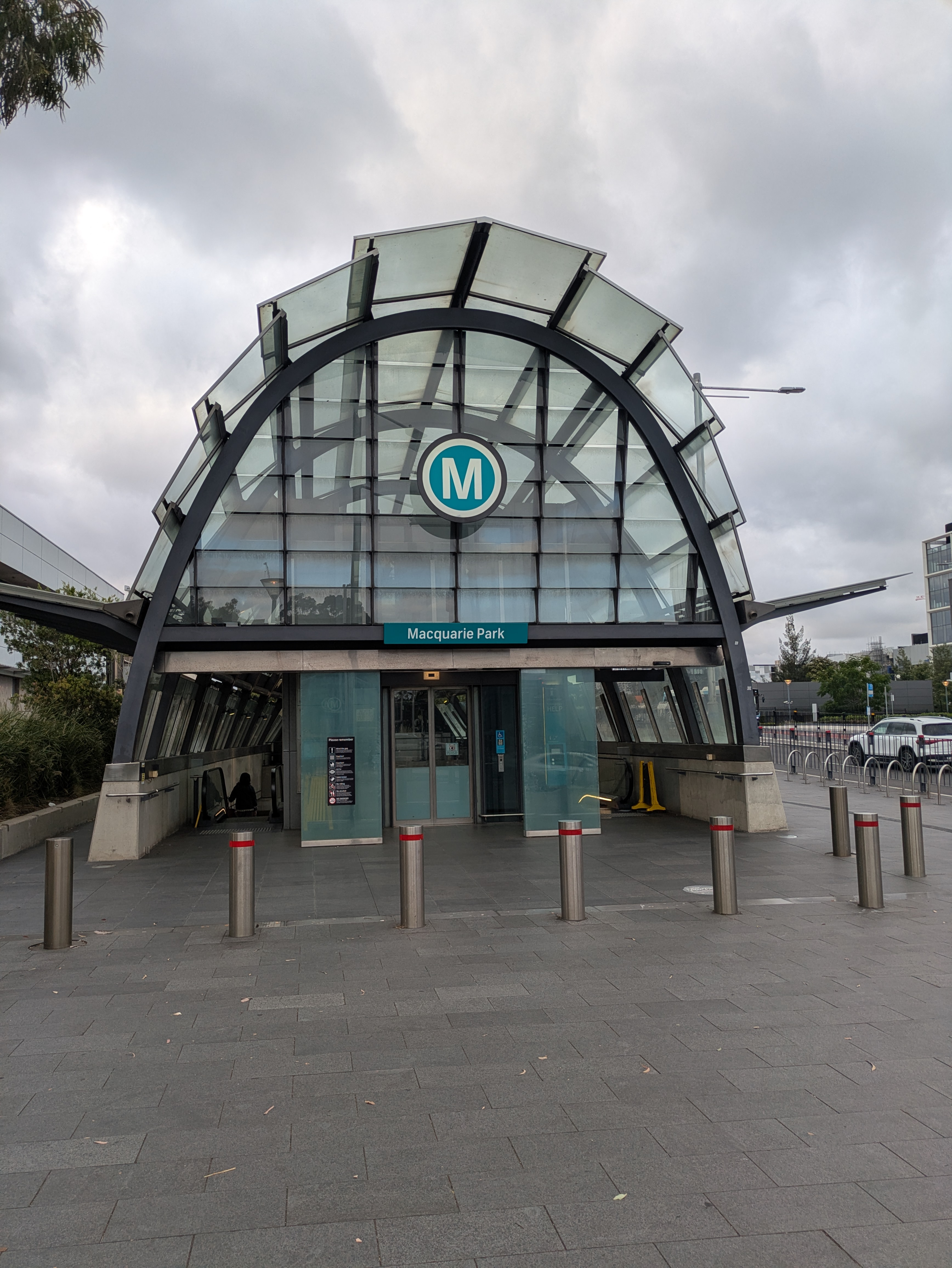
- Station entrance

General information
- Location: Corner Lane Cove & Waterloo Roads, Macquarie Park
- Coordinates: 33°47′06″S 151°07′42″E
- Owner: Transport Asset Manager of New South Wales
- Operator: Metro Trains Sydney
- Line: Metro North West & Bankstown Line
- Platforms: 2 (1 island)
- Tracks: 2
- Connections: Bus

Construction
- Structure type: Underground
- Accessible: Yes

Other information
- Status: Staffed
- Station code: MQP

History
- Opened: 23 February 2009
- Rebuilt: 2018/19

Passengers
- 2023: 1,868,440 (year); 5,119 (daily) (Sydney Metro)

Services
Preceding station	Sydney Metro	Following station
Macquarie University towards Tallawong	M1 Metro North West & Bankstown Line	North Ryde towards Bankstown
Other services
Former services
Preceding station	Sydney Trains	Following station
Macquarie University towards Hornsby	T1 North Shore & Western Line Strathfield via Chatswood and Central (2009–2018)	North Ryde towards Strathfield
Location

Macquarie Park railway station is located on the Sydney Metro network, serving the suburb of Macquarie Park. It was formerly part of Sydney Trains' T1 Northern Line, before being converted to service the Metro North West & Bankstown Line.

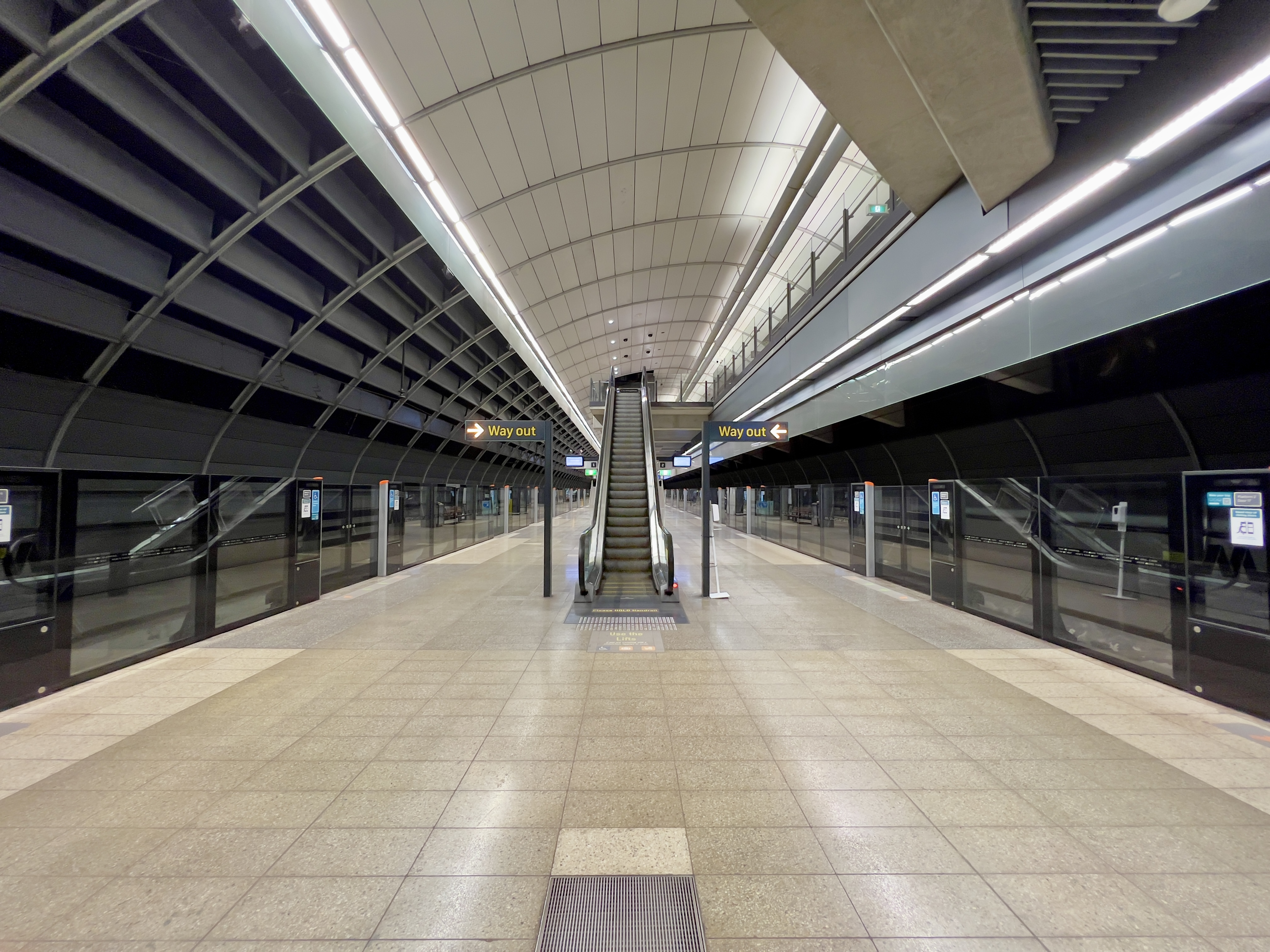
Station platforms viewing exit via escalator, March 2023

== History ==
Macquarie Park station opened as part of the Epping to Chatswood Rail Link on 23 February 2009.

Macquarie Park station closed in September 2018 for seven months for conversion to service Sydney Metro network station on the Metro North West Line, which included the installation of platform screen doors. It reopened on 26 May 2019.

== Services ==
Platform	Line	Stopping pattern	Notes
1	M1 Metro North West & Bankstown Line	Services to Bankstown	
2	M1 Metro North West & Bankstown Line	Services to Tallawong	

There are currently 12 bus routes servicing Macquarie Park station operated by Busways, CDC NSW and Transit Systems, and one NightRide route.

== Trackplan ==
External image
- Macquarie Park Bus Guide by Transport for NSW
