= North Ryde railway station =

Sydney Metro railway station

North Ryde
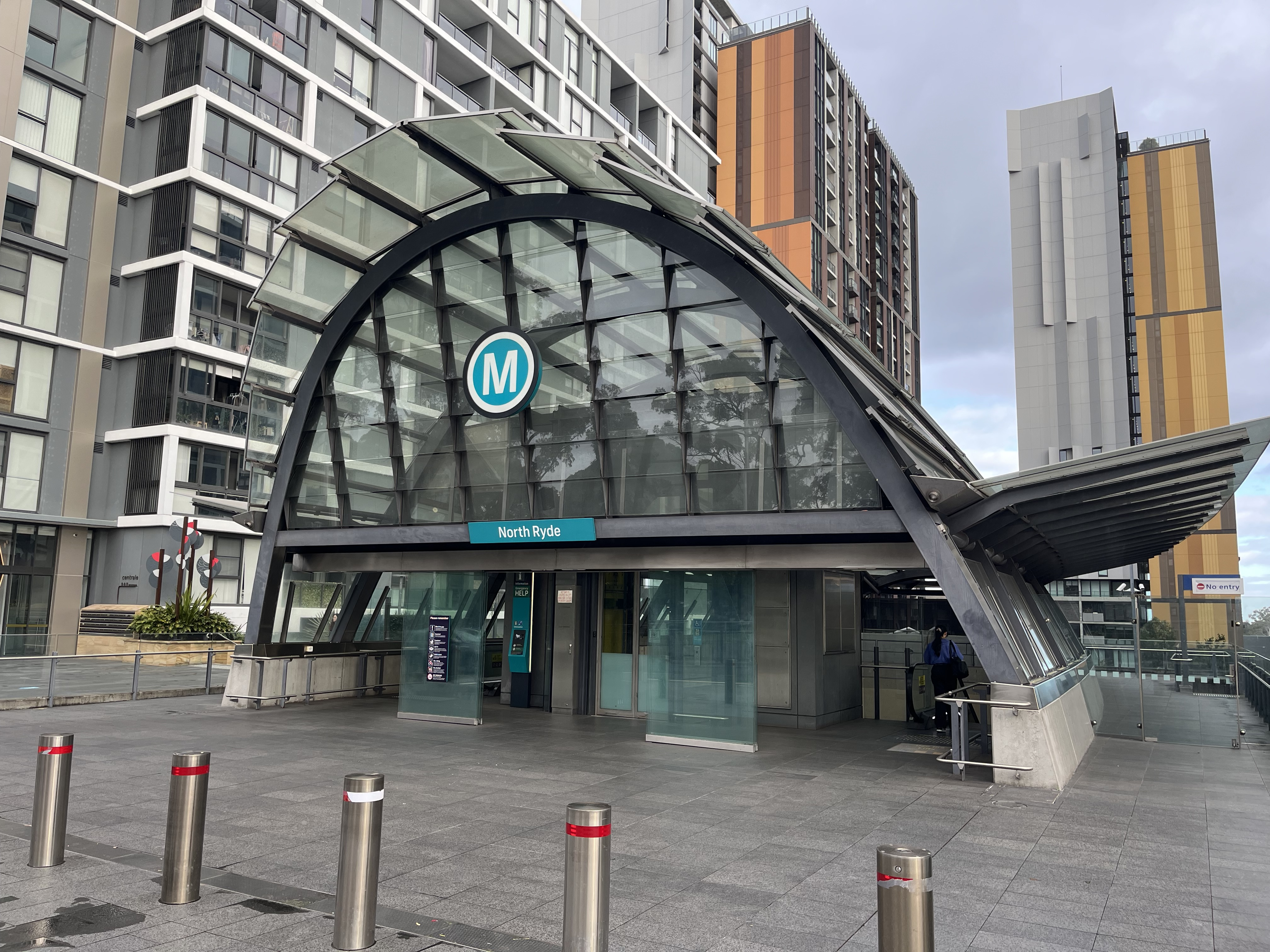
- Station entrance, May 2023

General information
- Location: Delhi Road, North Ryde, New South Wales, Australia
- Coordinates: 33°47′41″S 151°08′18″E
- System: Rapid transit
- Owner: Transport Asset Manager of New South Wales
- Operator: Metro Trains Sydney
- Line: Metro North West & Bankstown Line
- Platforms: 2 (1 island)
- Tracks: 2
- Connections: Bus

Construction
- Structure type: Underground
- Cycle facilities: Bicycle shed at surface entrance
- Accessible: Yes

Other information
- Status: Staffed
- Station code: NTR

History
- Opened: 23 February 2009
- Rebuilt: 2018/19

Passengers
- 2023: 1,422,190 (year); 3,896 (daily) (Sydney Metro)

Services
Preceding station	Sydney Metro	Following station
Macquarie Park towards Tallawong	M1 Metro North West & Bankstown Line	Chatswood towards Bankstown
Other services
Former services
Preceding station	Sydney Trains	Following station
Macquarie Park towards Hornsby	T1 North Shore & Western Line Strathfield via Chatswood and Central (2009–2018)	Chatswood towards Strathfield
Location

North Ryde railway station is located on the Metro North West & Bankstown Line, serving the Sydney suburb of North Ryde, New South Wales, Australia. Formerly part of Sydney Trains T1 Northern Line, the station started operating under the Sydney Metro network from May 2019.

== History ==
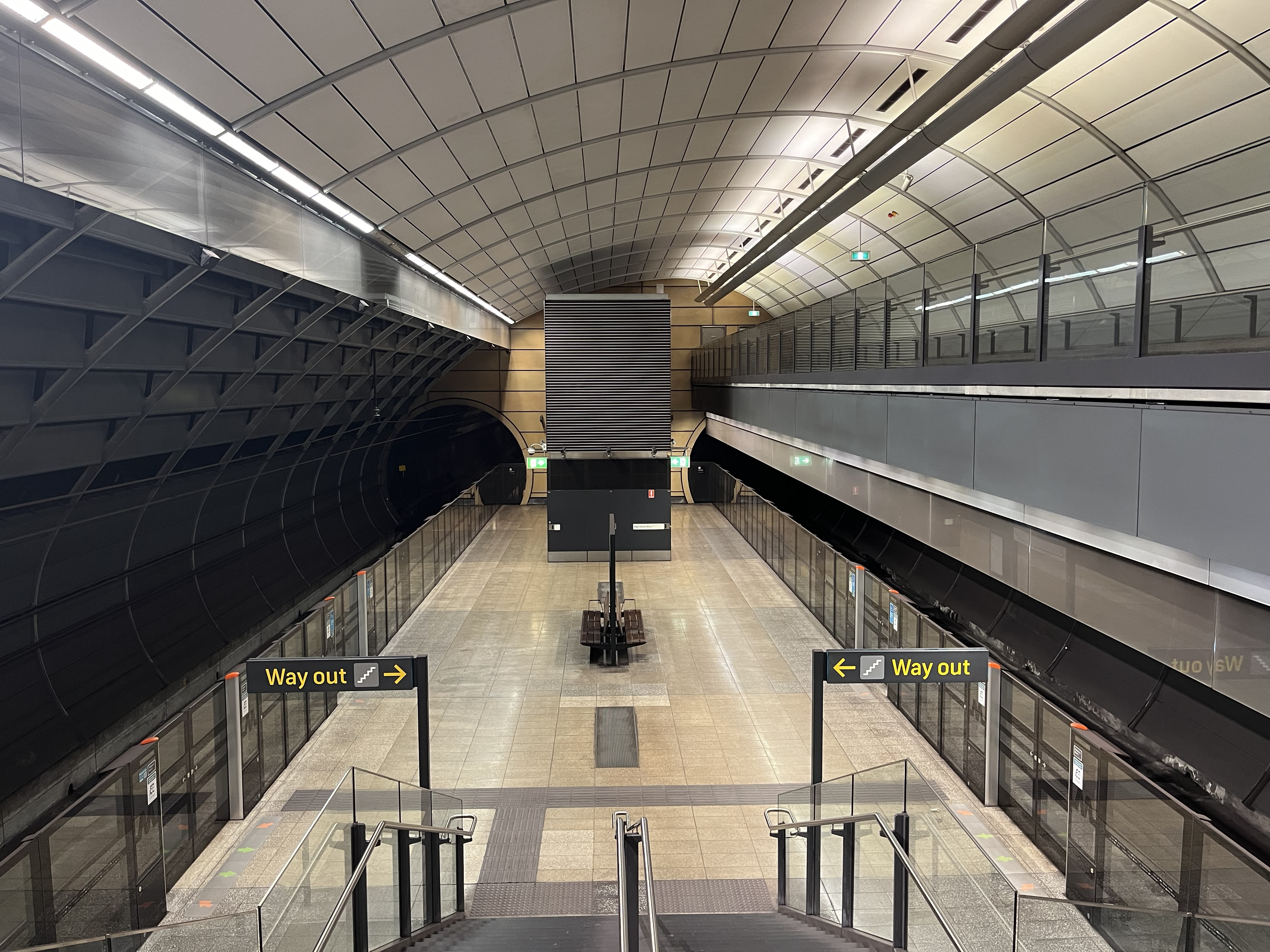
Platform

North Ryde station opened on 23 February 2009 on the same date as the Chatswood to Epping line. It was built on the site of Network Ten's former television studios, now occupied by apartments named Ryde Gardens.

The original, proposed name of the station was Delhi Road after the adjacent street. On 12 June 2006, North Ryde Railway Station was submitted to the Geographical Names Board of New South Wales as the provisional official name of the station.

North Ryde station closed in September 2018 for seven months for conversion to a Sydney Metro station on the Metro North West Line, which included the installation of platform screen doors. It reopened on 26 May 2019. It serves the nearby Lachlan's Line mixed-use development, which first opened in 2019. The residential development is connected to North Ryde station via a shared pedestrian/cycling bridge over the M2 Hills Motorway and Delhi Road.

== Services ==
Platform	Line	Stopping pattern	Notes
1	M1 Metro North West & Bankstown Line	Services to Bankstown	
2	M1 Metro North West & Bankstown Line	Services to Tallawong	

Busways operates two routes via North Ryde station including the NightRide route.

External image
- North Ryde Bus Guide by Transport for NSW
