= NSW Schoolhouse Museum =

Education museum in Sydney, Australia

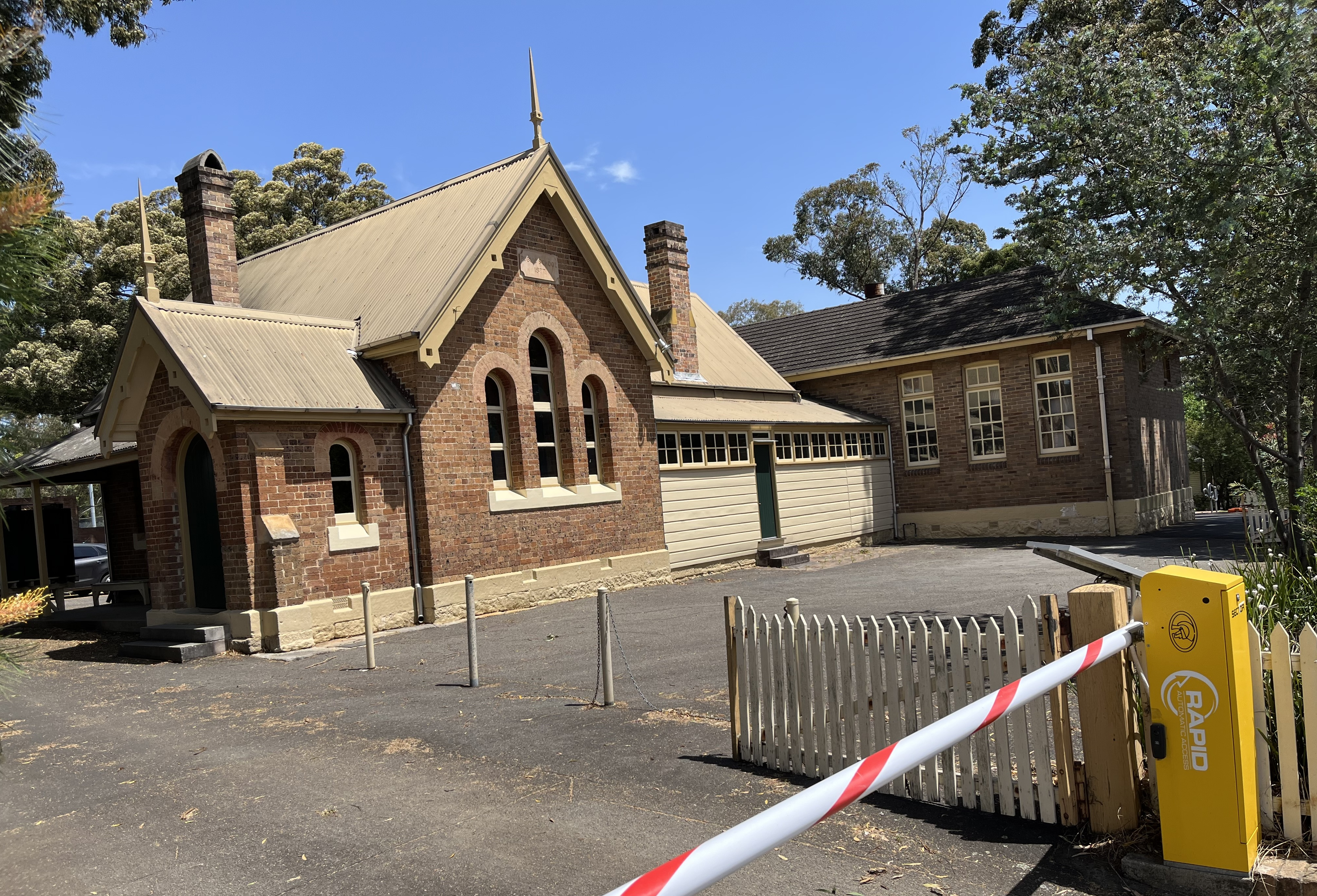
- NSW Schoolhouse Museum in October 2021
- Location: 154 Coxs Road, North Ryde, Sydney, New South Wales, Australia
- Coordinates: 33°47′41″S 151°07′17″E
- Type: School museum
- Website: www.schoolhousemuseum.org.au

The NSW Schoolhouse Museum, also known as the New South Wales Schoolhouse Museum of Public Education, is located within the school grounds of North Ryde Public School in North Ryde, a suburb of Sydney, New South Wales, Australia.

The museum includes a replica of an 1870s classroom to be found in the original 1877 school building. It was restored by volunteers in 1992 and officially opened by Virginia Chadwick, then the NSW Minister for Education in November 1992. As well as school furniture, the collection includes books, magazines, photographs and documents.

School groups visit the museum and are greeted by staff in 1870s period costumes. The students are given a lesson using pen and ink from inkwells in the classroom which has no artificial lighting.

The museum site and furniture is let to film and television crews, providing an additional source of income to that paid for school excursions. Entry is by appointment only.

The museum is managed by a committee of volunteers.
