= CBD Rail Link =

CBD Rail Link may refer to:

- City Rail Link, an under development rail tunnel in Auckland, New Zealand
- Redfern to Chatswood railway line, a proposed rail link in Sydney, Australia
- CBD Relief Line, a similar proposed rail link in Sydney, Australia

== See also ==
- CBD (disambiguation)
- CBD Line (disambiguation)
