= CBD Line =

CBD Line may refer to:

- CBD Relief Line, a cancelled underground railway line in Sydney, Australia
- Line 28 (Beijing Subway), also known as CBD Line, a rapid transit line under construction in Beijing, China

== See also ==
- CBD Rail Link (disambiguation)
