= Proposed railways in Sydney =

Various railway lines have been proposed for Sydney, Australia, including both heavy rail extensions to the dominant suburban network, and more recently proposals for metro lines – one of which was completed in 2019. There have been various proposed light rail expansions, which are covered separately.

== Pre-Bradfield Proposals ==
Between the opening of the first railway in the Sydney area (Sydney-Parramatta, 1855) and the publication of the comprehensive Bradfield plan for expansion of the metropolitan railways, there were a number of other proposed railway schemes which did not proceed.

Planning in the early 1880s for the route of the first stage of the Illawarra railway considered a route continuing south from Kogarah, crossing the George's River at Taren Point, then turning southwest to climb the gradual slope from the river to Sutherland. Opposition to this route by Thomas Holt MLC, who owned most of what is now the urban part of Sutherland Shire meant the railway had to take an indirect route via Hurstville, which necessitated the high-level crossing of George's River at Como, and the steep climb from there to Sutherland.

Following the extension of the Belmore railway to Bankstown in 1909, it was intended to continue this line west in a direct line to meet the Main Southern line at Liverpool. Due to the rural nature of this area and the likely consequent low patronage levels, there was no great rush to construct this line. In the event, the railway was extended north rather than west in 1928, to connect to the Lidcombe-Cabramatta line, which had been opened as far as Regents Park in 1912 then extended to Cabramatta in 1924.

== Bradfield railway scheme, 1920s ==
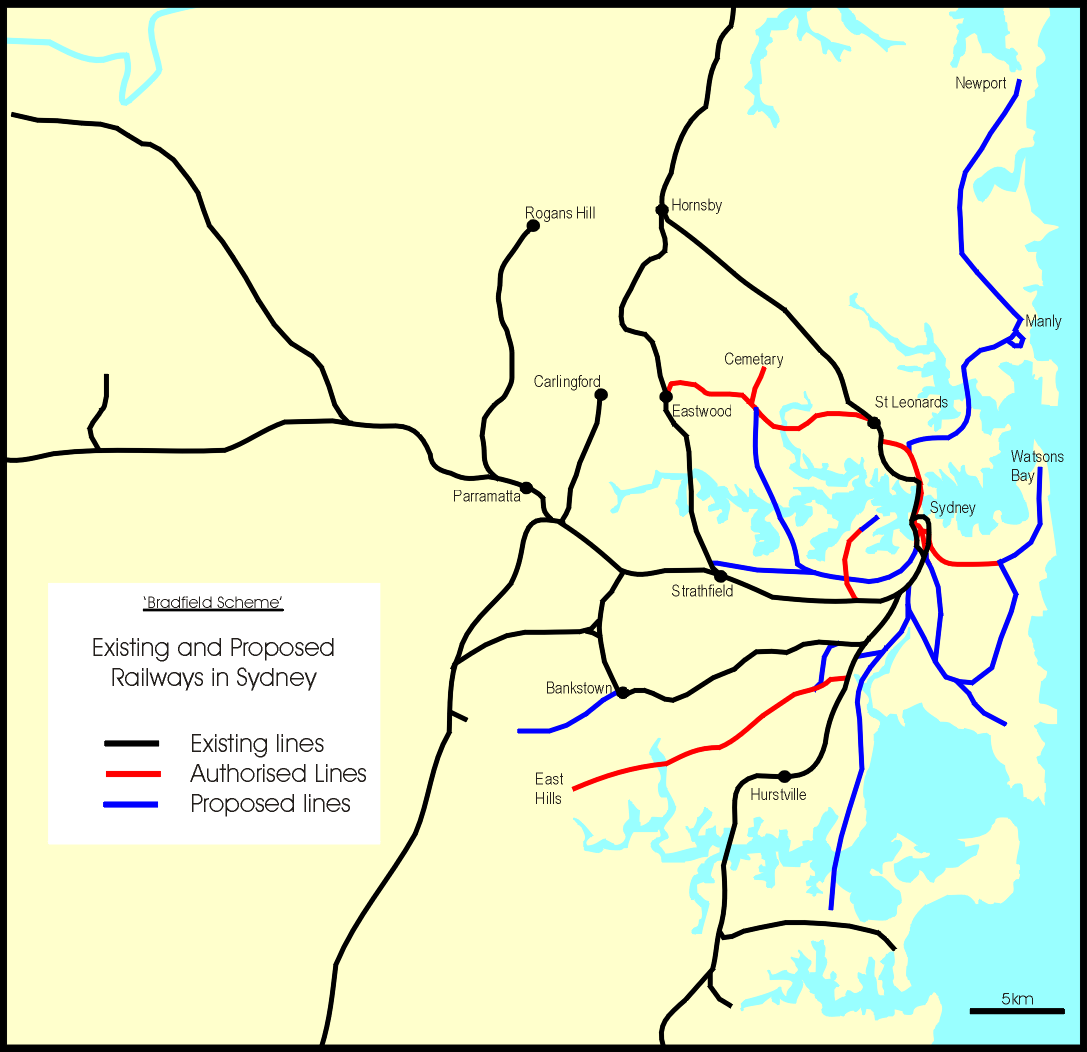
The original railway network for Sydney planned by John Bradfield

John Bradfield, engineer and designer of the Sydney Harbour Bridge, had a grand vision for Sydney's railway system that has only been partly fulfilled. After joining the New South Wales Public Works Department in 1891, he submitted a report in 1915 calling for the electrification of the suburban railways, a city underground railway and the Harbour Bridge. World War I led to the collapse of all three proposals, and it was not until 1922 that the Bridge Bill passed through parliament, and 1923 until the first sod was turned on the city railway.

Bradfield's overall concept called for the construction of a network of underground city railway lines in association with the construction of the Sydney Harbour Bridge and a new rail terminal, Central. A larger network of lines was proposed for the western, eastern and southern suburbs (see map) however most of these lines remained concepts only and have never been constructed. The Great Depression and later World War II, along with the growth of the motor car that led to the passenger numbers in Bradfield's plans being grossly overestimated, all prevented the full realisation of the Bradfield scheme. Parts of the city underground were constructed and exist as the present day City Circle, with small sections built for the additional proposed city lines such as additional platforms at Wynyard and St James stations which have never been used for heavy rail transport. The underground city loop was constructed originally as a stub line to St James, and the line through Town Hall and Wynyard to the Harbour Bridge. It was not until 1955 that the loop was completed by the construction of Circular Quay station. A line to the eastern suburbs was eventually built, but along a different alignment to that envisaged by Bradfield, who proposed a line along Oxford Street.

== County of Cumberland Plan, 1948 ==
This was the first comprehensive metropolitan land use and transport plan for Sydney's existing and proposed future urban areas. Its sponsoring body, the Cumberland County Council, did not have the statutory powers to implement the plan, and much of the scheme was frustrated by uncontrolled development and policy decisions of other government bodies. One such element of the County of Cumberland planning scheme which did not see the light of day were two circumferential railways, one from the Cronulla line at Mortdale to the East Hills line at Riverwood, and to continue this route, another line from Padstow to the Bankstown line at Bankstown. By the early 1960s, large parts of these routes had been built on (much by another government body, the Housing Commission) and, without tunnelling, became unimplementable.

== Sydney Area Transportation Study, 1974 ==
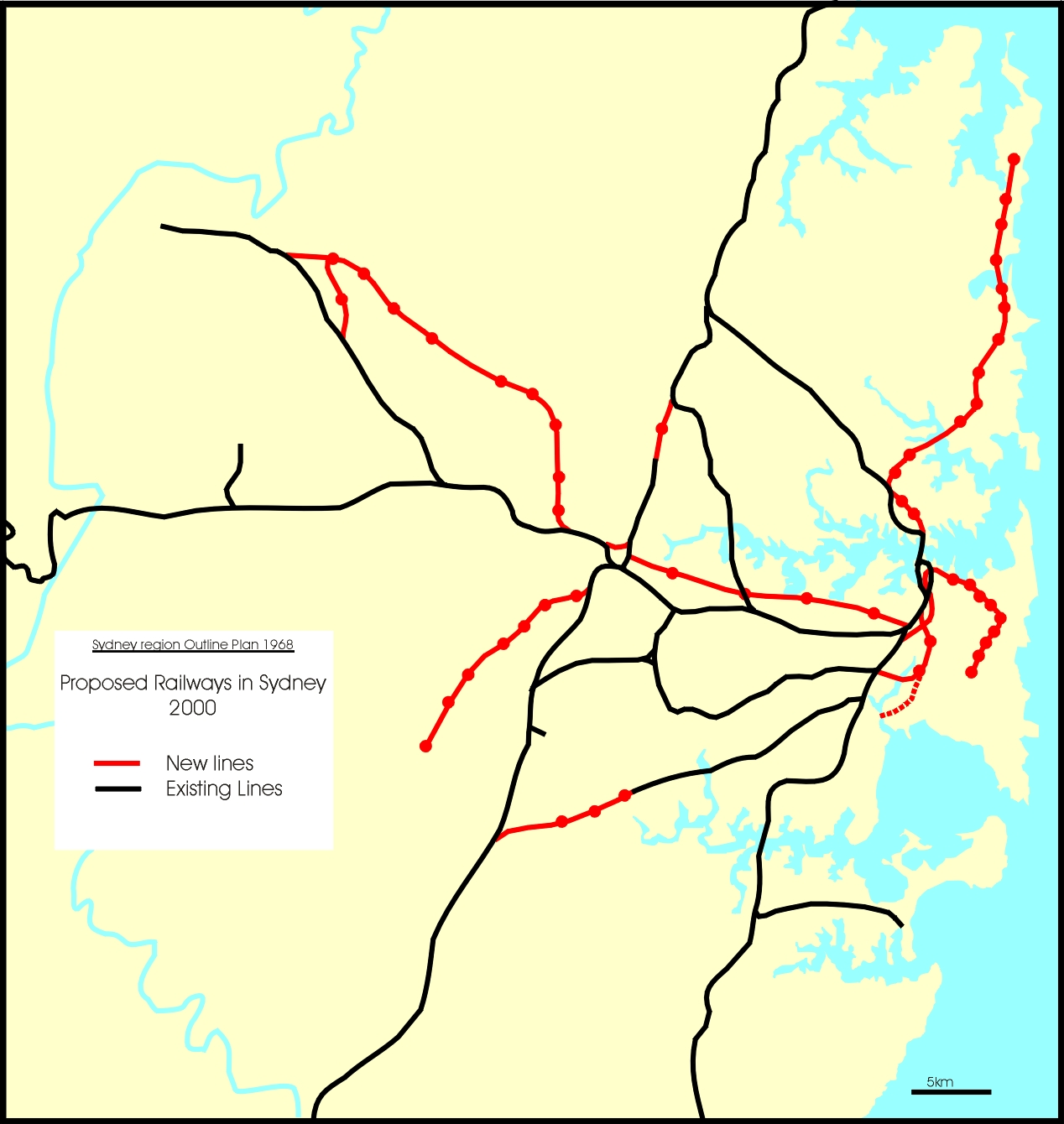
Existing and proposed railways, Sydney Region Outline Plan 1968

In 1968, the State Planning Authority of New South Wales released the Sydney Region Outline Plan, which was to guide the development of Sydney for the period 1970–2000. In particular, it aimed to develop new growth corridors to areas such as Green Valley, Campbelltown and Blacktown. This was followed in 1974 by the Sydney Area Transportation Study which proposed several new rail lines in the new growth areas as well as several new lines to ease congestion in the established areas of Sydney. The proposed lines were:

- a line linking Parramatta and Windsor via the Hills District,
- a line between Merrylands and Green Valley,
- a line to the Northern Beaches, including a new underground section through Crows Nest,
- the complete Eastern suburbs line to Kingsford, already under construction at the time but later truncated to Bondi Junction (opened 1979),
- an extension of the East Hills line from East Hills to Glenfield (later constructed and opened in 1987),
- an express line between Redfern and Parramatta, running parallel but north of the existing Main Suburban line,
- a line connecting the Bankstown line at Sydenham with Redfern via Mascot and Alexandria, with a possible future branch to Sydney Airport,
- an extension of the Carlingford line to meet the Main North line at Beecroft, with an intermediate station,
- a connection between the Carlingford line at Rosehill and Parramatta

The rail plans also involved significant duplication and quadruplication of existing lines. Despite extensive modelling, the vast majority of the proposals outlined were not constructed.

== Eastern Suburbs Railway, 1960–1970s ==
In 1967, the NSW government recommenced construction on the dormant Eastern Suburbs line that had been partly constructed and had lain dormant since 1952. The original proposal was for a line to Kingsford via Bondi Junction, Randwick and the University of New South Wales. In 1976, the project was curtailed to Bondi Junction, and the full line to Kingsford was not constructed.

== MetroWest proposal, 1990 ==
In 1990, the State Rail Authority undertook a feasibility study into the development of a new underground line along the western edge of the central business district. Called MetroWest, the proposal called for the construction of a new underground line between Redfern and Wynyard along the western edge of the CBD with a new underground station complex at Central station, new stations in the Haymarket and Market Street areas, and terminating at a remodelled Wynyard station. The proposal would include platforms suitable to fit longer InterUrban passenger trains from the Central and South Coasts and the Blue Mountains, running through the new line in lieu of terminating at Central. The line underwent a two-year feasibility study and the corridor remains protected for possible future development with planning buffers placed along the corridor in 2006, however plans presently remain unrealised. It was later realised that around $400 million was wasted after this proposal was cancelled.

== Action for Transport 2010, 1998 ==
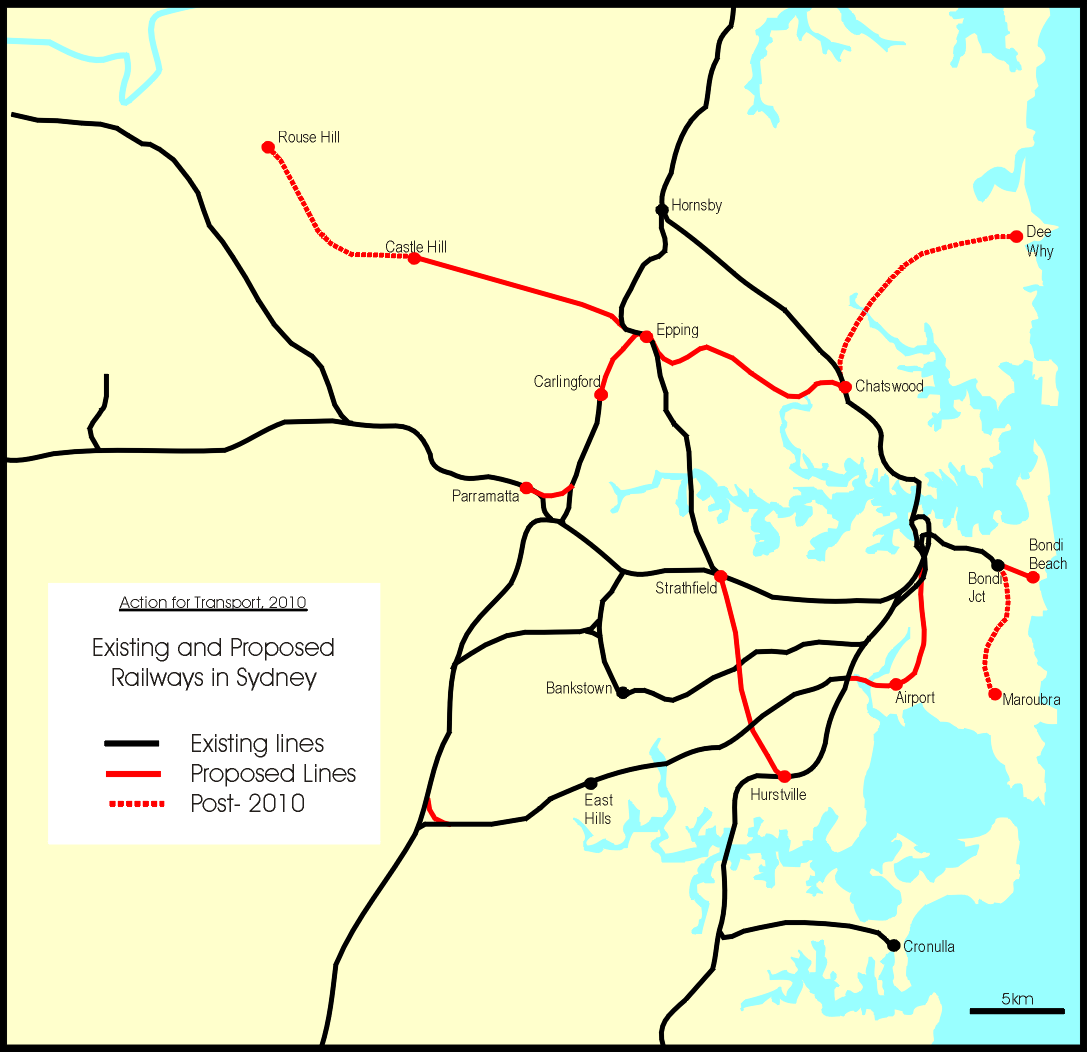
Map of proposed lines under the Action for Transport 2010 plan, 1998.

In 1998, the NSW government released a position paper on various road and public transport projects to be delivered before 2010. The rail projects envisaged were:

- the Airport line, already under construction at the time and completed in 2000
- an extension of the Eastern Suburbs line to Bondi Beach, to be completed by 2002
- the Parramatta Rail Link between Parramatta and Chatswood by 2006
- a Hornsby to Newcastle High Speed Rail line to have started by 2010
- a North West Rail Link between Epping and Castle Hill by 2010
- a Sutherland to Wollongong High Speed Rail line by 2010
- a Hurstville to Strathfield railway line to start by 2010 and be completed in 2014
- a Liverpool 'Y Link' to start by 2010

Three projects were listed for consideration as additions after 2010:

- a line to the Warringah Peninsula
- an extended Eastern Suburbs line towards Maroubra
- an extension of the North West railway line towards Rouse Hill

Of these proposals, only the Airport line and the Epping - Chatswood section of the Parramatta Rail Link, which were already under construction or advanced planning, were completed in 2000 and 2009 respectively. The North West railway line from Epping to Rouse Hill would also later be completed in 2019 but as a Sydney Metro rapid transit system instead, utilising Epping - Chatswood section of the Parramatta Rail Link. However, most of the proposed roads and motorways outlined in the same paper have been constructed.

== Bondi Beach railway ==
In 1996, the NSW government proposed a privately funded extension of the Eastern Suburbs railway line from Bondi Junction to Bondi Beach. The final proposed version of the line would have seen a single track extension ending in a station under Bondi Beach park, with a premium (extra $2.50 proposed) added to ticket prices. The Bondi Beach Railway Company, a consortium of Lendlease and Macquarie Bank, proposed to build and maintain the railway at a cost of $197 million and to lease it to CityRail for a 30-year term, after which ownership would transfer to the State Rail Authority. The proposal met with fierce opposition from local residents who were concerned with the loss of parkland, fare premium, and little potential use by residents. After a degree of planning and gaining Federal Government backing, the proposal was dropped in 1999.

== 'Christie' proposals, 2001 ==
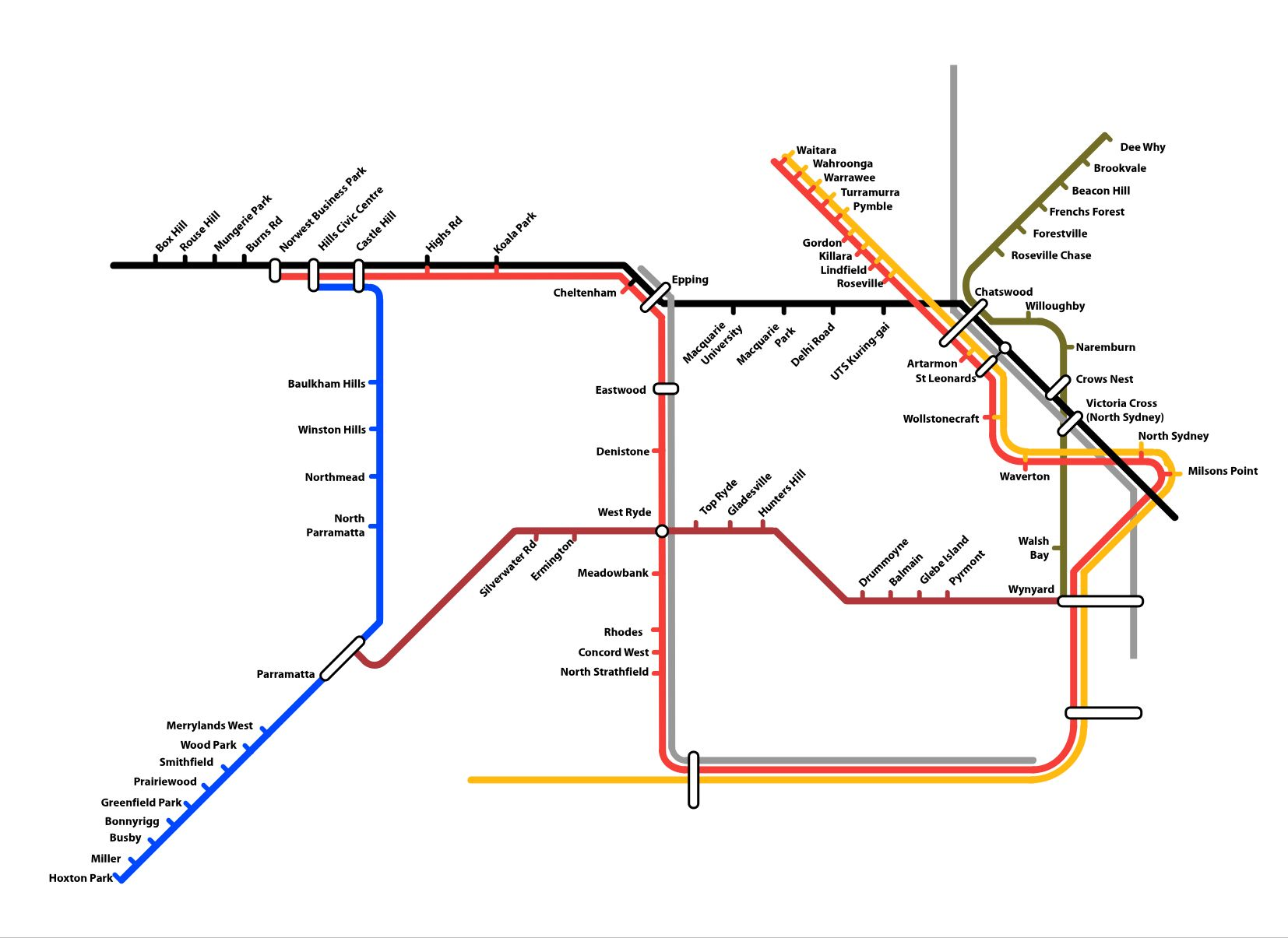
Partial diagram of possible 2050 network under the proposed Christie report

In 2001, the Co-ordinator General of Rail, Ron Christie, released a report, the Long-Term Strategic Plan for Rail for Sydney, the Central Coast, Newcastle, the Illawarra, the South Coast and the Blue Mountains, which outlined the critical infrastructure that would need to be built between then and 2050 to ensure the long-term survival and operation of the CityRail network. Christie's report suggested that several "metro" lines should be built to service new areas and to relieve capacity on existing lines. In particular, Christie suggested lines:

- between Cronulla and Miranda in Sydney's south to Dee Why on the northern beaches, via the airport, the CBD and North Sydney
- from Parramatta via Top Ryde or Olympic Park to the CBD via Drummoyne, with potential extension to the University of New South Wales and Sydenham
- from Hoxton Park to Parramatta and Castle Hill

== Western FastRail ==
Western FastRail was a privately operated underground rail tunnel proposed to run between the Sydney CBD and Parramatta, a distance of 26 km, with the high-speed link continuing to Penrith on the outskirts of Sydney. First introduced in 2004 by a consortium of Dutch bank ABN AMRO and developer Leighton Holdings, the project, dubbed the Penrith High Speed Link, was again floated in December 2006 and received favourable comments by the New South Wales State Government, and was offered funding by Federal Opposition Leader Kevin Rudd should the Australian Labor Party win the 2007 Federal Election.

The proposed link would ease congestion along the main west–east corridor and reduce the current 29-minute service into the city to just 12 minutes. The service would operate in conjunction with RailCorp, and would use CityRail's existing railway stations and ticketing system, but with an extra fee on top of the normal CityRail ticket price (at approximately $9.90 a trip including a $3.10 surcharge). The train fleet and rail infrastructure would be built and maintained by a private company. The line has been estimated to cost $5 billion.

== Metropolitan Rail Expansion Program, 2005 ==
On 15 June 2005, Premier Bob Carr shortly before his resignation announced the Metropolitan Rail Expansion Program (MREP). The MREP consisted of three new rail connections:

- a North West Rail Link from Cheltenham to Rouse Hill
- a South West line between Glenfield and Leppington in Sydney's South West
- a CBD Rail Link between Redfern and Chatswood

Estimated to cost about $8 billion, $5 billion of which was for the building of a new tunnel under the Sydney Harbour Bridge and the Sydney central business district, (called the CBD Rail Link). Under this plan, the north-west suburbs would be served by the North West Rail Link by 2017, the new south-west suburbs would be linked to the network via the South West Rail Link by 2015, and the rail line would pass through the new growth corridor from Ryde to the airport. Critics of the New South Wales government criticised what they perceived as a lack of follow through, citing the previously planned Parramatta to Chatswood rail link which had since been truncated to link only Epping to Chatswood, with the Epping to Parramatta portion postponed indefinitely.

It would also have included quadrupled lines between St Leonards and Chatswood on the North Shore line. In 2006, Premier Morris Iemma placed planning controls along two potential corridors in the CBD (the MetroWest and MetroPitt routes) to secure future accessibility. Developers who wanted to excavate deeper than two metres within a 25-metre buffer zone of the corridors needed to seek RailCorp's approval.

=== Parramatta Rail Link (PRL) ===
In 2002, the State Government proposed a Parramatta-Epping-Chatswood link. That same year construction began on the latter half which was completed seven years later as the Epping to Chatswood railway line. However the other half was postponed indefinitely in 2003 by Transport Minister Michael Costa citing a lack of projected passenger numbers and economic viability.

On 11 August 2010, the Rudd Federal Government promised $2.6 billion towards this project, which, along with the NSW State Labor Government, would have constructed a line from Parramatta to Epping through the Carlingford line. Work was due to start in 2011, with a prospected 2017 finish, but the O'Farrell government cancelled the project, instead requesting that Federal funding be diverted to a more expensive upgrade of the Pacific Highway. The Gillard Federal Government responded by revoking the funding altogether.

=== North West Rail Link ===
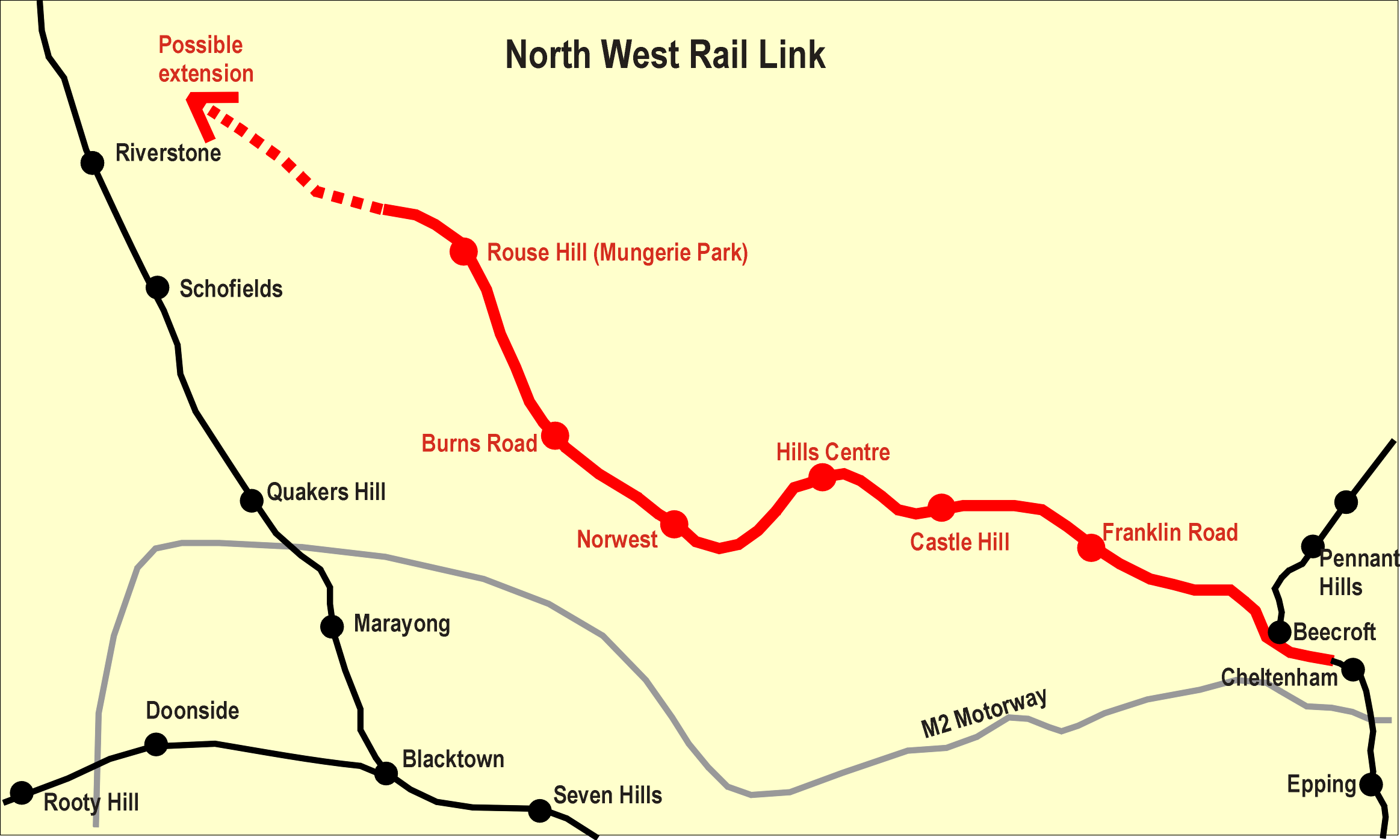
Sydney Metro Northwest

After its original announcement in 1998 for completion in 2010 as part of the Action for Transport 2010 plan, in 2006 the schedule was revised for completion in 2017 and later brought forward to a staged plan for train services to Castle Hill and Hills Centre in 2015, and to Rouse Hill by 2017. It was planned to be 22 kilometres in length, consisting of a 16 kilometre section in tunnel from Epping to the proposed Burns Road Station, followed by a 4 kilometre section above ground from Burns Road to Rouse Hill. Six new stations were proposed to be constructed at Franklin Road, Castle Hill, Hills Centre, Norwest, Burns Road and Rouse Hill. A train stabling facility was proposed at the north west of Rouse Hill Town Centre. The NWRL was to connect with the Epping to Chatswood Rail Link through a direct tunnel between Epping and Franklin Road stations, although an original proposal connected with the existing Northern line north of Cheltenham. The direct route was to use the stub tunnels originally built for the deferred Parramatta Rail Link between Parramatta and Epping. New stub tunnels for the Parramatta Rail Link were to be constructed so that if the Parramatta line were completed, trains from Parramatta would have also been able to link into the Epping-Chatswood Line.

It was proposed that the NWRL would offer an off peak rail service of four trains per hour, with six to eight trains per hour in peak periods and was expected to carry six to eight million passengers per year.

In 2008, the North West rail line was superseded by the now-cancelled North West Metro (see below). In 2010, the NWRL was resurrected as part of a new Metropolitan Transport Plan (see below). In May 2011, the new Coalition Government released the proposed plan for comment and drilling commenced on 7 September 2011.

=== South West Rail Link ===
The South West Rail Link was announced as part of the Metropolitan Rail Expansion Program to cater to the "South West Growth Centre". It was to consist of a 12-kilometre, twin-track railway running from Leppington and Edmondson Park to connect with the South line at Glenfield. The project also included a train stabling facility to the west of the new Leppington station, and a redesigned and expanded Glenfield station with flyovers to connect with the East Hills line.

On 31 October 2008, the Premier revealed that the South West Rail Link was to be 'indefinitely shelved' due to budgetary constraints, and only an upgrade of the Glenfield Station car park was to proceed. On 14 November 2009, the then-New South Wales Premier Nathan Rees announced that construction of stage two of the South West Rail Link would begin in mid-2010, with completion scheduled for 2016.

=== CBD Rail Link ===
The third component to the MREP was the CBD Rail Link, a new underground railway line starting at Redfern station, travelling under the Central Business District and under Sydney Harbour, through the Northern Sydney suburbs and ending at the existing Chatswood railway station. The six kilometre cross-tunnel was slated to cost $5 billion and was to include new or expanded stations at Redfern, Central, Pitt Street, Martin Place, Circular Quay, Victoria Cross, Crows Nest, St Leonards, Artarmon and Chatswood.

On 13 September 2007, it looked unlikely that the New South Wales government would commit to the line when they announced a proposal for a metro line that would span the harbour, the Anzac Line (see below). On 19 March 2008 the State Government announced that the line would be on hold after construction begins on the North West Metro in 2010, its role to be partly superseded by that railway line. In October 2008, the North West Metro line itself was cancelled and replaced with a shorter CBD metro which would partly follow the alignment of the CBD Rail Link.

== Metro proposals, 2008 ==
Map showing Anzac Line, 2007

=== Anzac Line ===
In 2007, the NSW government announced the concept of an underground metro line between West Ryde and Malabar. The line would have started at West Ryde station on the Northern line before travelling beneath Victoria Road through Top Ryde, Gladesville, Drummoyne, Rozelle and Pyrmont. The line would then pass through existing city stations at Wynyard, Martin Place and St James, before heading south beneath Anzac Parade to Moore Park, the University of New South Wales in Kensington, Maroubra Junction and Malabar. No detailed design or planning was performed, and the western leg of the line (between West Ryde and the city) was adapted into planning for the North West Metro in 2008.

=== North West Metro ===
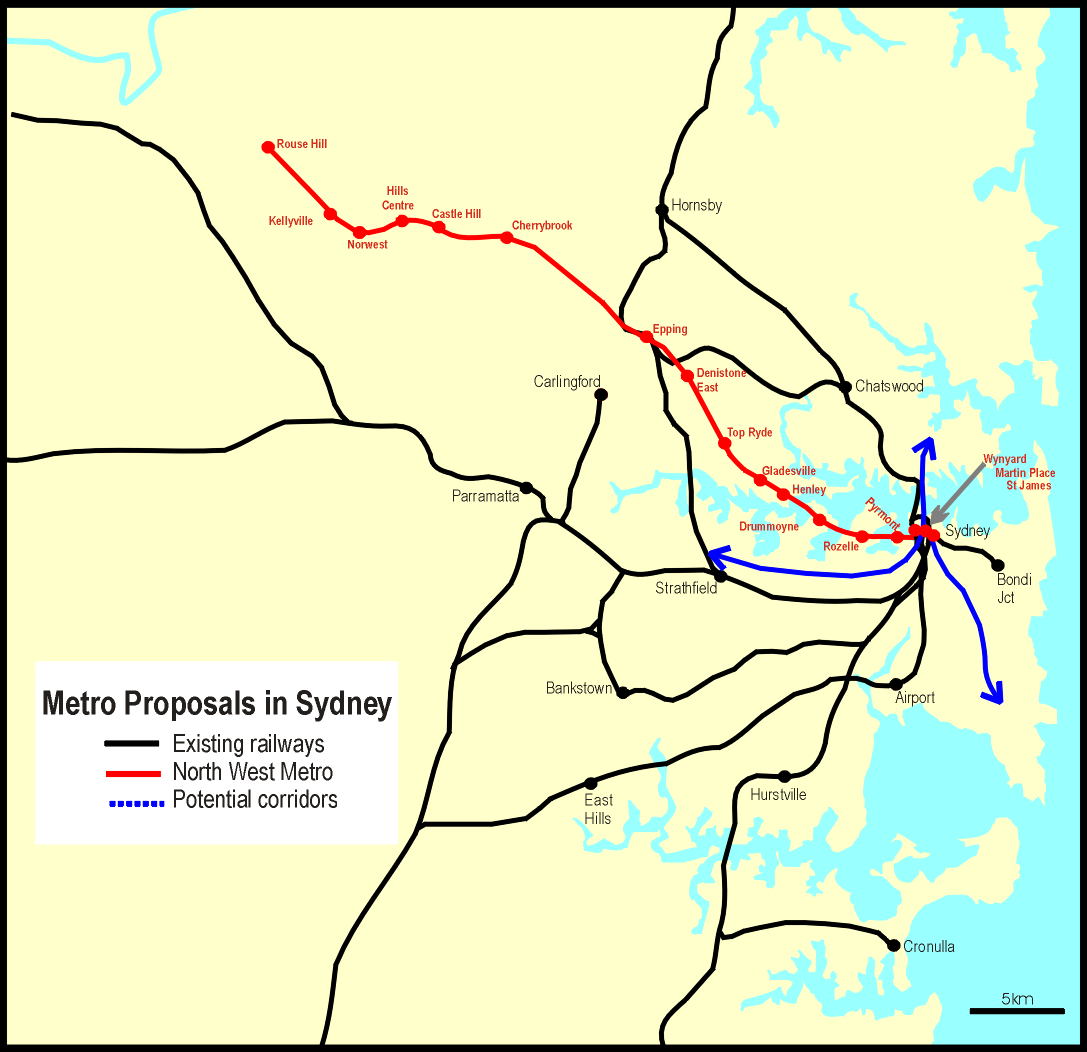
Map showing North West Metro, 2008

In early 2008, the NSW State government announced plans to build a metro line between the North West suburbs of Sydney and the CBD. Known as the North West Metro, the line would have superseded the North West Line which was to be built as part of the Metropolitan Rail Expansion Program, and included a new section between Epping and the CBD via Gladesville, approximately along the course of Victoria Road. Controversial from the start, the line was criticised for being too long, too expensive, and inappropriate for a low density suburban area.

The North West Metro was to have been 37 kilometres in length, with 32 kilometres underground and 5 kilometres above ground. The line was likely to have been operated without drivers. The North West Metro would have incorporate the alignment and stations previously proposed by the North West Rail Link but included the additional benefits of directly linking the North West with Gladesville, Drummoyne, Pyrmont and the CBD. There were proposed to be 17 new metro stations at St James, Martin Place, Wynyard, Pyrmont, Rozelle, Drummoyne, Henley, Gladesville, Top Ryde, Denistone East, Epping, Cherrybrook, Castle Hill, Hills Centre, Norwest, Kellyville and Rouse Hill.

According to the State Government press release announcing the North West Metro project, the metro line was to offer a rail service of one train every four to five minutes (three minutes during peak hours). However, there was debate as to whether advertised point-to-point transit times may have been too optimistic. It was to have run on conventional standard gauge track, similar to the existing CityRail network, but with single deck rolling stock.

In October 2008, the newly appointed NSW Premier Nathan Rees cast doubts upon the likelihood of constructing the North West Metro, and instead proposed a short metro line between Central station and Rozelle via Town Hall and East Darling Harbour (Barangaroo), with the potential for further westwards extension to Macquarie Park and Epping. On 31 October 2008, the Premier announced that the North West Metro would not proceed due to budgetary constraints.

=== CBD Metro ===
On 23 October 2008, Rees announced the CBD Metro, a shortened version of the North West Metro which would run from Rozelle to Central stations. It was submitted to Infrastructure Australia for funding, with construction proposed to commence in 2010. It was also announced that the line might be extended to link from Rozelle station to Epping and Macquarie Park in the future. In December 2008, the project was placed on a short-list of projects to be funded by Infrastructure Australia's Building Australia Fund.

=== West Metro ===
After the announcement of the North West Metro, the State Government announced concepts for a metro line through the Inner Western suburbs of Sydney (to be known as the West Metro), and the potential for a South East Metro along the route of the before-mentioned Anzac Line beneath Anzac Parade. Like the CBD Metro, the West Metro was placed on a short-list of projects to be funded by Infrastructure Australia's Building Australia Fund. in December 2008.

Despite geotechnical work having been performed and the acquisition of properties in progress, in February 2010, the Government of New South Wales led by premier Kristina Keneally announced that it had cancelled plans for metro construction.

== 2031 Sydney Transport Blueprint, 2009 ==
In 2009, the Sydney Morning Herald revealed plans for a "Sydney Transport Blueprint" which the deposed NSW Premier Nathan Rees was to release in December 2009. The proposal was to include:

- the West Metro from Westmead to the city.
- a metro to the south-eastern suburbs of Randwick, Kensington, the UNSW, Kingsford and Maroubra.
- a heavy rail link to the Hills District in the north-west.
- completing the missing rail link between Parramatta and Epping.
- a metro from Olympic Park to Hurstville.
- a CityRail CBD Relief Line under the city.
- Radial transport links into Parramatta.

The proposals were to cost $180 billion over 25 years. In late 2009, Nathan Rees was deposed by Kristina Keneally casting doubt upon the blueprint.

== Metropolitan Transport Plan: Connecting the City of Cities, 2010 ==
In February 2010, the NSW premier Kristina Keneally announced the Metropolitan Transport Plan: Connecting the City of Cities. Plans for metro lines were cancelled, with the focus altered to expansion of the present heavy rail system. The rail-related portions consisted of:

- a Western Express CityRail service consisting of a new CBD Relief tunnel between Redfern and Wynyard with new platforms at Redfern, Central, Town Hall and Wynyard.
- the North West rail link from Epping to Rouse Hill with six stations at Franklin Road, Castle Hill, Hills Centre, Norwest, Burns Road and Rouse Hill, to commence construction in 2017.
- an expansion of the current light rail system to Dulwich Hill, Circular Quay and Barangaroo.

In August 2010, the federal Labor Party announced funding for the Epping-Parramatta rail line (as an extension of the Carlingford Line) as part of its re-election bid for the 2010 federal election, despite it not appearing in the State Government's Transport Plan.

In March 2011, the state election resulted in the election of Barry O'Farrell as premier of NSW, who committed to constructing the North West rail line and the light rail extension. The Western Express and CBD Relief Line were cancelled by the new government. The Epping-Parramatta rail line was later shelved by the NSW Government.

== NSW Transport Masterplan, 2012 ==
In June 2012, the government released the Sydney's Rail Future: Modernising Sydney's Trains plan. The plan warned that if there was not a second Harbour Crossing and CBD line by 2031 there would be moderate to severe overcrowding on lines approaching the CBD, with passenger displacement predicted for the Northern Line and East Hills/Illawarra Line. The plan also predicted further congestion at the three major CBD stations: Central, Town Hall and Wynyard.

In December 2012, Premier Barry O'Farrell announced a new transport masterplan for Sydney and New South Wales after community feedback and discussion.

The new plan includes:

- The creation of NSW TrainLink and Sydney Trains to replace RailCorp from 1 July 2013.
- Extension of the Inner West Light Rail from Lilyfield to Dulwich Hill railway station with a proposed opening by 2014. This project opened in March 2014.
- Frequency and reliability improvements from 2013 including platform de-cluttering, platform redesign, ATO and ATP as part of the Sydney's Rail Future plan.
- Completion of the South West Rail Link between Leppington and Glenfield with a proposed opening by late 2015. This project opened in February 2015.
- Construction of the privately run rapid transit North West Rail Link from Cudgegong Road to Epping with signal improvements (ATO/ATP) to the Epping to Chatswood Rail Link with a proposed opening by 2019. Operated as single level trains with 12 per hour, services will terminate at Chatswood until the second Harbour Crossing is constructed. The project, now known as Sydney Metro Northwest, opened in May 2019.
- Construction of the CBD and South East Light Rail with a proposed opening by 2019. The opening was delayed to April 2020.
- A Second Harbour Crossing providing services from the Hills District through the Sydney CBD to Redfern with new stations to be built in the CBD. This is now a part of Sydney Metro City & Southwest, with a station at Waterloo instead of Redfern.
- 'untangling' the CBD network to allow for capacity improvements on the Western Line.
- Conversion of the Bankstown Line and Illawarra line (up to Hurstville) into rapid-transit lines with single-deck trains with network connection through the CBD to the Second Harbour Crossing.

=== Sydney Metro ===
The announcement of North West Rail Link as rapid transit reignited the concept of a rapid transit system in Sydney.

On 11 June 2014, the Second Harbour Crossing and conversion of Bankstown Line into rapid transit previously announced in 2012, evolved into an extension of the North West Rail Link single-deck rail services from Chatswood to Sydney CBD and Bankstown. Proposed stations at St Leonards, Artarmon Industrial Area, and University of Sydney, along with line extensions to Hurstville and from Bankstown to Cabramatta and Lidcombe were removed in the announcement. Stations at Crows Nest, Victoria Cross in North Sydney, Barangaroo, Martin Place, Pitt Street, Central and Waterloo were confirmed. Construction work commenced during 2017 and opened in August 2024.

The announcement was presented as conditional on the government's proposed sale of electricity distribution assets and at the time it was not certain that the sale would raise enough capital to fund both Sydney Metro and other promised projects. Following the passage of power privatisation bills in June 2015, the rapid transit system, including North West Rail Link, was renamed 'Sydney Metro'.

== Future Transport Strategy 2056, 2018 ==
In 2018, the NSW Government released a planning document for potential railway lines and other transport corridors to be built and/or upgraded by 2056. As of mid-2023, it was last updated in 2022.

In 2023, the government announced that it was committed to extending the Bankstown line and it will be driverless.

== See also ==
- Railways in Sydney
- Sydney Trains
- Sydney Metro Authority
