= Relief line =

A relief line refers generally to a secondary rail line running alongside a main line to allow extra capacity.

Examples known as the "relief line" include:

- CBD Relief Line in Sydney, Australia
- Great Western Main Line in England and Wales
- Relief Line (Toronto) in Toronto, Canada
