= Sydney Metro (2008 proposal) =

Proposed rapid transit railway network in Sydney

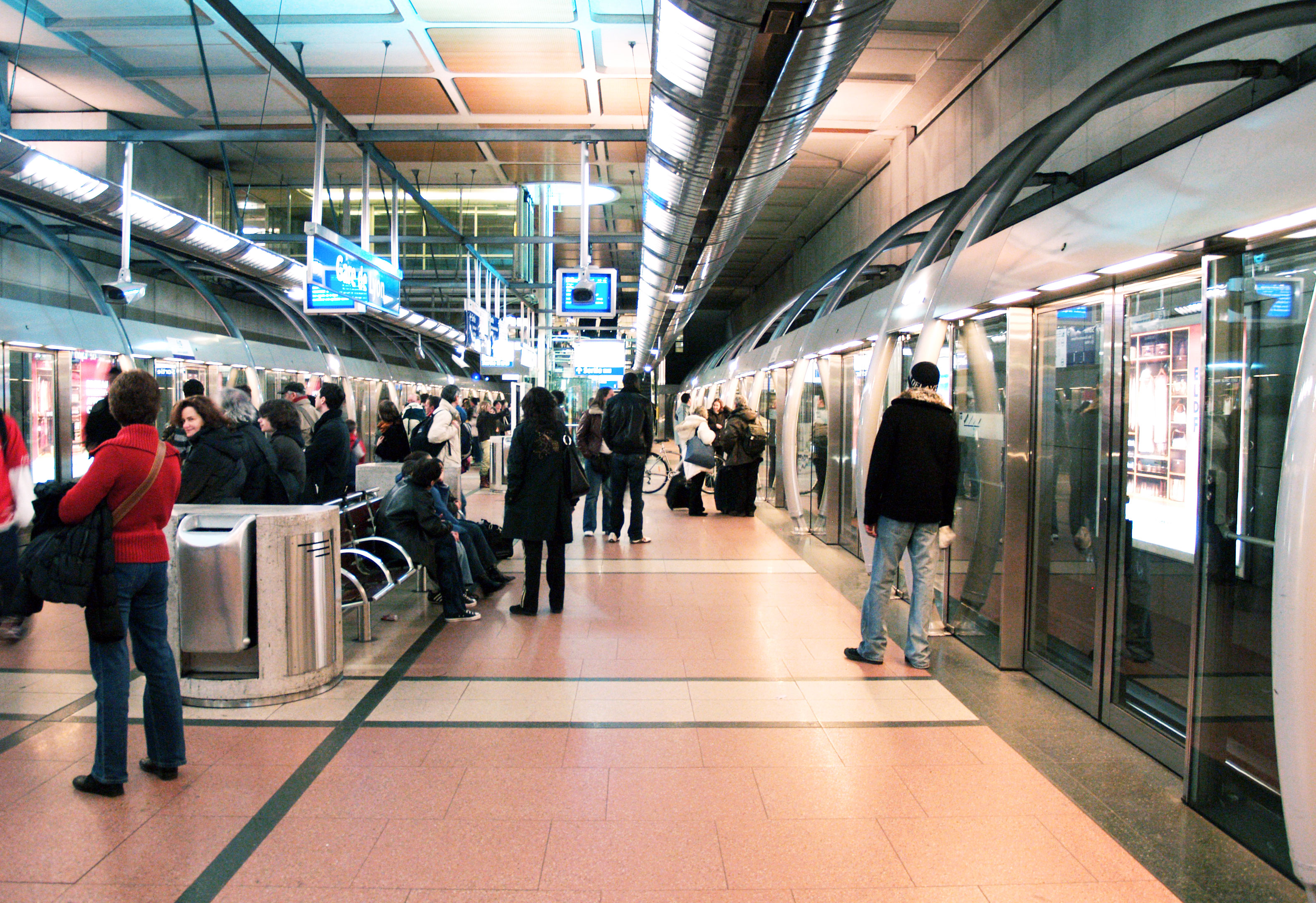
- Paris Métro Line 14 was cited as a model for the project

Overview
- Status: Withdrawn proposal
- Owner: Sydney Metro Authority
- Locale: Sydney
- Termini: Central; Rouse Hill; Westmead
- Stations: 34 announced

Service
- Type: Rapid transit network
- System: Sydney Metro
- Services: 3 announced
- Operators: Keolis consortium; or; Serco consortium
- Depot: Rozelle (proposed)

History
- Metro Link announced: 18 March 2008
- Sydney Metro announced: October 2008
- Proposal withdrawn: February 2010

Technical
- Line length: 63 km announced
- Character: Underground
- Track gauge: Standard gauge

Sydney Metro was a proposed rapid transit railway network in Sydney, intended to connect the central business district (CBD) with the inner and outer city suburbs Rouse Hill, Westmead, Malabar and lower North Shore. Initially proposed in 2008 as 'Metro Link', the plan was modified and renamed later that year. After half a billion dollars was spent on planning, property acquisitions and a tender process, it was cancelled in 2010.

The fate of the initial Metro proposal was tied to the failure of a plan to privatise much of the then state-owned electricity sector, a plan which would have released tens of billions of dollars in capital for investment in new infrastructure. When the privatisation plan was dramatically scaled back under pressure from the union movement, the Metro proposal was reduced to a nine-kilometre shuttle between the CBD and the inner-western suburb of Rozelle, raising questions about the project's value for money.

The short life of the Sydney Metro proposal was a significant contributing factor to Labor's rout at the 2011 state election.

Although Labor's Sydney Metro proposals were not revived, an alternative rapid transit system was proposed by the O'Farrell government elected in 2011. Construction of this scheme, also known as Sydney Metro, began in 2013 and the first line opened in 2019.

== Early proposals ==
Although Sydney Metro would have been the first rapid transit metro to be built in Australia – and one of only a handful in the Southern Hemisphere – the idea was not new. John Bradfield, the chief engineer who planned the electrification of the Sydney rail network and construction of the City Circle, was heavily influenced by his observations of the New York City Subway and referred to aspects of his scheme as "rapid transit".

A true rapid transit system, separate from the increasingly congested suburban rail system, was proposed in 1968 by the State Planning Authority's Sydney Region Outline Plan (SROP). At the time, a number of cities were planning or building modern, standalone metros, including Toronto (opened 1954), Lisbon (1959), Montreal (1966), São Paulo (1974), Seoul (1974), Santiago (1975), Washington DC, (1976) and Hong Kong (1979).

The authority noted that because Sydney's suburban train system was not built from scratch as a passenger-only network, commuter trains often shared track with long-distance passenger and freight services, constraining reliability. The 1964 introduction of the first double-deck carriages boosted capacity to an extent, but also increased dwell times, swallowing up much of the intended capacity benefit.

SROP's solution was a rapid transit system that would have augmented the city's most crowded rail line, the Main West, with a fast, single-deck operation between the CBD and Parramatta. But though SROP fundamentally shaped Sydney's growth for the next 20 years, the planned line was never built: improvements to the existing railway always took priority. Forty-four years later, a government report was to observe that in delaying the advent of rapid transit, "we have pushed the complex two-door double deck network further than any other operator."

SROP's eventual replacement, a plan called Sydney Into Its Third Century, was released by Labor planning minister Bob Carr in 1988. Although not a transport policy as such, the document set a radical change of direction that unwittingly built the strategic case for rapid transit. Firstly, it broke with SROP's cardinal rule that new development should occur along existing railway corridors. Secondly, it mandated a dramatic increase in urban density within the city's existing footprint.

== Christie report ==
The inner city lines will all be saturated within the next ten years or so, and there will be a need for a new, alternative route through the CBD.

— Ron Christie, June 2001

It was Carr himself who had to deal with the consequences of his metropolitan plan, when he was elected Premier of New South Wales in 1995. At first, the needs of the forthcoming Sydney 2000 Olympics – new rail lines to the airport and the new stadium planned by his Liberal predecessors – took priority.

Carr's first new rail proposal was the Parramatta to Epping Rail Link (PERL), announced in 1998. Something like it – a St Leonards to Eastwood line – had figured in Bradfield's 1920 plan. Carr and his transport minister, Carl Scully, built on the idea by extending the corridor westward, via the underused Carlingford branch line, to Western Sydney's chief employment centre, Parramatta. The need for this western extension was questionable: indeed, Carr and Scully's successor, Michael Costa, were to remove it from the plan five years later, citing low expected patronage. But the political imperative was clear: Carr owed his 1995 victory to just three electoral districts, all of them in western Sydney. The next priority was the north west, where as planning minister Carr had green-lit future development far from mass transit links. The government's solution was heavy rail from Epping to Castle Hill, and bus rapid transit from Castle Hill to the new suburbs.

Although this 1998 plan, called Action for Transport, contained a rhetorical commitment to public ownership of train services, both the Airport Link and a proposed Bondi Beach extension were to be operated and maintained by the private sector using government-run trains. This represented the beginnings of a major strategic shift, with future rapid transit proposals to incorporate private-sector operation as a core element.

The following year, a train collision at Glenbrook in the lower Blue Mountains killed seven people and injured 51. Carr and Scully recognised that the rail system needed a serious strategic review, and commissioned a former State Rail Authority boss, Ron Christie, to conduct one.

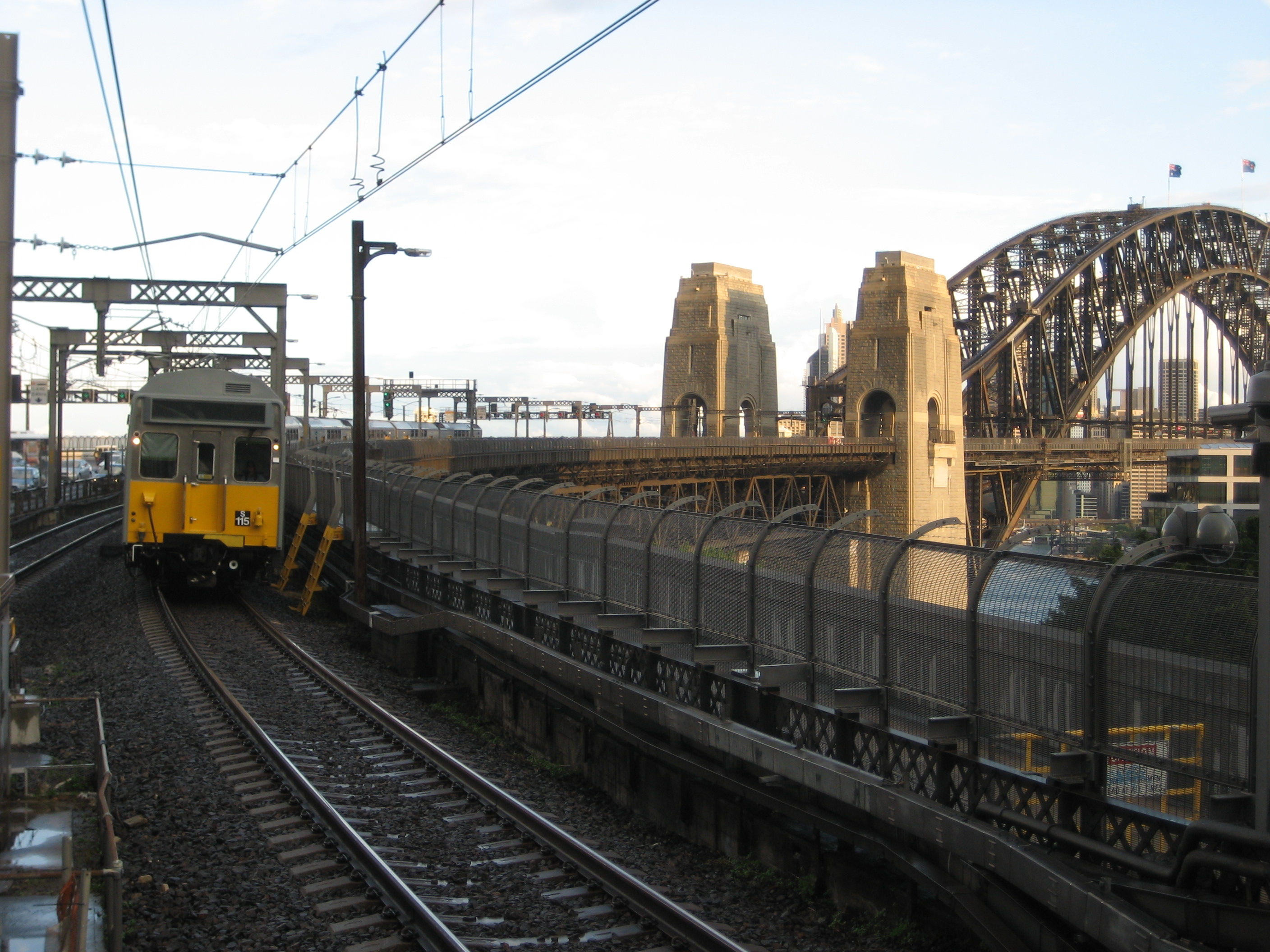
Christie recognised that the network as a whole was constrained by a limited number of tracks running into the CBD.

Christie's conclusions were politically unwelcome. Not only was the scale of investment required vast, but the prerequisite for network growth was an expensive new tunnel under the harbour and CBD, far from western Sydney. Yet the rail chief's warnings could not be ignored:

the inner city lines will all be saturated within the next ten years or so, and there will be a need for a new, alternative route through the CBD, from Eveleigh to St Leonards, in the medium term, most likely by between 2011 and 2015 ... This project is regarded as being of the highest priority. Without it, the metropolitan rail system will face strangulation and progressive operational collapse.

Christie's report also flagged the potential for a future rapid transit ("metro") network, marking the mode's re-emergence in official thinking after a long absence. However, he sought to delay implementation of a standalone metro system until his report's 2021–51 "long term", at which time he saw the potential for:

- a Parramatta–CBD–Airport "River Metro"
- a Hoxton Park–Parramatta–Castle Hill "Parramatta Metro"
- a Cronulla–CBD–Dee Why "Central Metro".

For a year, Carr and his ministers attempted to suppress the report, but it leaked in 2002. In 2003, seven people were killed in a derailment at Waterfall, in the city's south. Action for Transport was no longer viable: operationally or politically.

Its replacement, announced in 2005, was a Rail Clearways Program to boost the capacity of existing lines and an $8 billion Metropolitan Rail Expansion Programme (MREP) to add a new underground line to the CBD and extend the network's reach into the growth areas to the north-west and south-west. There was, however, no mention of rapid transit.

Four months later, Carr quit politics, having become the state's longest continuously serving premier. His replacement, health minister Morris Iemma, confirmed the government would retain its commitment to MREP, including it in the State Plan and the Urban Transport Statement the following year.

== Iemma as premier ==
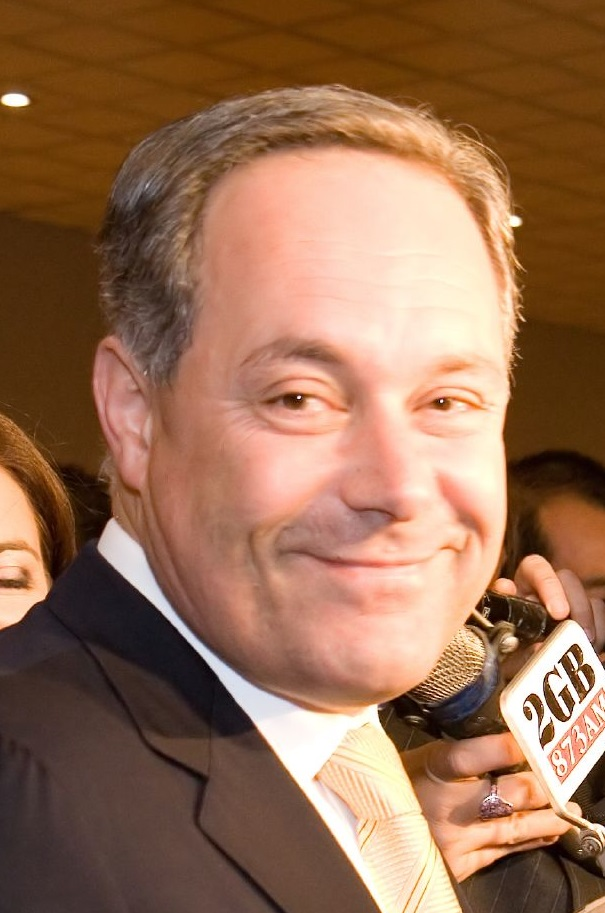
Premier Iemma was the first NSW leader to propose a rapid transit network for Sydney.

This is why I am the Premier.

— Morris Iemma, late 2007

Journalist Simon Benson describes a crucial meeting in late 2007 between Iemma and Labor state president Bernie Riordan during the height of the furore over electricity privatisation:

[Iemma] had laid out on his desk a spreadsheet of infrastructure projects … On the bottom half were all the projects the state needed if it was to avoid choking on its own congestion within the next decade. It amounted to more than $25 billion. And that was what they hadn't even announced.

"This is why I am the Premier," he told Riordan, emphasising his belief that it was critical for the privatisation to succeed. "… These [projects] need to be done. I need to do these."

Public transport was perhaps the most stark example of Carr's inaction. The issue, Iemma assured voters, was "my highest priority ... I hear and understand the frustrations of commuters and am determined to drive improvements."

The Olympic transport arrangements had been a triumph for Carr, and so former Olympic Co-ordination Authority head professor David Richmond was the choice to head up a powerful new infrastructure development unit within the Premier's Department. One of the unit's recruits was transport planner and future Sydney Metro director Rodd Staples.

The state's transport problem was threefold. First, the existing rail system was expensive to run, not least because the operator, RailCorp, remained tied to old-style industrial practices and excessively high engineering standards. Delivering MREP would have locked in these inefficiencies. Even if costs could be brought under control, the sheer scale of investment required to extend an all-purpose heavy rail system was beyond the state's means. Put simply, MREP was unaffordable in its current form. Third, while the need for additional extensions into the new bus and car-dependent suburbs of the north-west and south-west was clear – and would be aided by the partial preservation of corridors in the past – congestion at the existing Town Hall and Wynyard stations meant that to work, any new rail project had to increase capacity in the CBD. Yet there was little electoral advantage to be gained from digging new rail tunnels under safe seats in the lower North Shore and CBD.

The unit's solution – supported by Iemma and Costa – was to sidestep the high costs and industrial risks of the existing RailCorp network and instead begin building a new rapid transit rail system in parallel. The new system would incorporate smaller, lighter rolling stock, reducing construction costs, and be operated by the private sector, reducing operating costs. But despite the savings available via the rapid transit option, the costs were still beyond the state's means.

To prepare the ground for the day when the funding became available, the idea was trailed in the 2006 Urban Transport Statement, though no commitments were made.

=== 'Bullets to bite' ===
Despite expectations to the contrary, including within the party machine, Iemma comfortably won the 2007 election with the loss of only four seats. His strategy was to draw a line under the failures of the Carr era and ask the electorate for another chance.

Iemma and his close ally, former transport services minister Costa, though loyal to Carr, were reformists in the tradition of former prime ministers Gough Whitlam and Paul Keating. Immediately following the election, they secretly plotted their strategy for the next four years, under the heading of "bullets to bite". Both knew that if they were to build the new rapid transit system and address the growing crisis in electricity supply, they would need to bring the private sector into the state's electricity industry first.

The federal party's immediate political needs intervened, with the new federal Labor leader Kevin Rudd persuading Iemma to defer his privatisation announcement until after the 2007 federal election. Rudd felt he could ill afford the distraction of a debate over asset sales in the country's most populous state. With the funding source a secret, the rapid transit plan had to be kept under wraps as well.

=== Anzac Line 'actively considered' ===
Iemma used 2007 to further test the waters for his rapid transit concept. In September, he announced that a new "world class" and "Euro-style" metro railway – the "Anzac Line" – was under "active consideration". The Anzac Line was to have run from Malabar in the Eastern Suburbs to Ryde, in the northern suburbs via new or expanded CBD stations (the route was called River Metro in the Christie report and would have taken its name from Anzac Parade and the Anzac Bridge, two roads it would pass underneath.)

The Sydney Morning Herald, which had championed Christie's ideas in the past, welcomed the discussion but noted, "Sound or not, with this Government there is no reason to be confident that anything at all will come of either plan. Sydney has transport schemes which move rapidly from the future to the past without ever arriving in the present."

The Anzac line would have been in tunnel, stopping at:

- West Ryde
- Ryde
- Gladesville
- Drummoyne
- Rozelle
- Glebe Island
- Pyrmont
- Wynyard
- Martin Place
- St James
- Taylor Square
- Paddington
- Moore Park
- Randwick Racecourse
- University of New South Wales
- Maroubra Junction
- Malabar

Rudd's delay undermined the rapid transit plan in two ways. First, Iemma knew that he could not face the electorate again without first delivering a big-ticket infrastructure project. But the long lead times for required for planning, approvals and construction of a new railway meant that even a full four-year term would not be enough to make visible progress. Second, the delay provided more time for Iemma's position to deteriorate with an already impatient media and public. Iemma found himself continually buffeted by scandals not of his own making, followed by demands for minister after minister to be dumped.

Iemma had agreed to the delay the project under pressure from Rudd on the basis of Rudd's assurance that he would provide political cover for what the premier knew would be a bruising political fight. Rudd duly won the November 2007 election and Iemma announced electricity privatisation and the North West Metro a few months later.

=== Metro Link ===
Along with his plan to sell the government's electricity generation and retailing companies, Iemma announced a massive infrastructure scheme called "Sydney Link". This included MREP's South West Rail Link, and the "missing link" motorway connection between the M4 Western Motorway and the CBD. But its centrepiece was "Metro Link", a future rapid transit system of underground, privately operated, single-deck, automated trains. The first link in this network would be a $12 billion North West Metro. Two further possible routes were identified as next Metro priorities after North West Metro, which are the "West Metro" (CBD to Parramatta and Westmead) and the "South East Metro" (CBD to Malabar – the other half of the Anzac Line concept).

==== North West Metro ====
North West Metro was conceived as a 37-kilometre standard-gauge line running from the new growth area of Rouse Hill to the Main North line at Epping via the previously announced MREP North West Rail Link alignment; and on to the CBD via the previously floated 'Anzac' route through Gladesville and Rozelle. Iemma aimed to have construction underway by 2009 – before the 2011 election – with the line opening in stages between 2015 and 2017. There were to be stations at:

- Rouse Hill
- Kellyville
- Norwest
- Hills Centre
- Castle Hill
- Cherrybrook
- Epping
- Denistone East
- Top Ryde
- Gladesville
- Henley
- Drummoyne
- Rozelle
- Pyrmont
- Wynyard
- Martin Place
- St James

While Rudd made statements in support of the privatisation plan, he was lukewarm about North West Metro as a way to spend the proceeds. He and his treasurer, Wayne Swan, wanted an iconic western Sydney project to attach their names to, just as Whitlam had done with Westmead Hospital. North West Metro, serving the safe Liberal seats of Greenway and Mitchell, was an unappealing electoral prospect. Instead they offered $75 million, to be shared among the mainland states, to progress planning for a range of road and public transport projects. West Metro was on the list; North West Metro was not.

The Property Council and the Planning Institute were not enthused by North West Metro either. They considered fixing the existing CityRail network a more urgent priority, particularly since trains from the growing Macquarie Park area on the soon-to-be-completed Epping to Chatswood line, would have to compete for space on the Sydney Harbour Bridge with existing North Shore Line services.

=== Failed privatisation ===
The rail unions were none too keen on a private metro operator competing with RailCorp, but it was the Electrical Trades Union (ETU), ideologically opposed to the privatisation of the electricity businesses, that led opposition to the plan. The ETU had the good fortune that its then secretary, Bernie Riordan, was also the president of the state branch of the Australian Labor Party. The secretary of Unions NSW, John Robertson, was also a member of the ETU and opposed the privatisation. The party secretary, Karl Bitar, and his deputy, Luke Foley, were less ideologically committed on the issue, but their polling showed that the public was against a sale and – more importantly – tiring of Iemma and his team. They too came down against Iemma's plan.

In 2008, Iemma and treasurer Michael Costa proposed a scheme to privatise the electricity network in New South Wales at the state Labor conference which was voted down. In August 2008, the Liberal opposition, led by moderate Barry O'Farrell, saw an opportunity to wound Iemma by denying him the opportunity to build the metro. The Greens, the opposition and the Labor MPs that threatened to cross the floor, had the numbers to defeat the government in the upper house. Within the space of a few days, Costa and Iemma quit politics.

== Sydney Metro ==
Sydney Metro Authority
Agency overview
- Formed: 27 January 2009
- Dissolved: 1 July 2013
- Type: Corporation
- Jurisdiction: New South Wales
- Headquarters: Kent Street, Sydney
- Minister responsible: David Campbell, Minister for Transport and Roads
- Agency executive: Rodd Staples, Acting Chief Executive
- Parent department: Department of Transport & Infrastructure
- Key document: Transport Administration Act 1988 (NSW)

Yet for the Rees Government, heir to a decade's dithering over transport by its predecessors, more dithering is political death. Giving up on the CBD metro is akin to Stalin abandoning Stalingrad to the Wehrmacht – completely, utterly, absolutely unthinkable. Everything must be sacrificed to it ...

— The Sydney Morning Herald editorial, 3 October 2009

Iemma's replacement was the emergency services and water minister, Nathan Rees, who had only been in parliament for less than two years. Like Iemma, Rees recognised that failure to build transport infrastructure would not be forgiven come the 2011 election. But unlike Iemma, he had no plan to fund anything like what was required. In place of the North West Metro, he announced a two-stage project, dubbed Sydney Metro. Stage 1, known as CBD Metro, was a radically truncated version of the North West project: a nine-kilometre shuttle between Central and Rozelle. Stage 2, the West Metro, to be built at a later date, would extend from Central west to Parramatta and Westmead. West Metro was previously mentioned in Iemma's Metro Link proposal as a possible future Metro route.

=== Sydney Metro Authority ===
Following amendments to the Transport Administration Act 1988, a new Sydney Metro Authority commenced operations on 27 January 2009 under the leadership of chairman Simon Lane, a former head of the State Rail Authority, and chief executive Les Wielinga, a former head of the Roads & Traffic Authority. In June, Wielinga left to head up the new Department of Transport & Infrastructure, and was replaced in an acting capacity by Rodd Staples (Staples would go on to head up the North West Rail Link project under Liberal transport minister Gladys Berejiklian. Of Staples' CBD Metro experience, Berejiklian said "We will not blame very, very talented people for the mistakes of the previous Labor government.")

=== Preferred network ===
The authority developed a "preferred" metro scheme consisting of three lines: Westmead–Rouse Hill (line 1), Malabar–Dee Why (line 2) and Macquarie Park–Hurstville (line 3). The three lines were to be built over nine stages, with the last stage completed in 2036.

==== Stage 1: CBD Metro ====
Although limited in scale, the project was positioned as enabling urban densification, particularly at the Barangaroo and Pyrmont precincts, and forming the "spine" of a wider network in future. As part of the proposal, a train stabling and maintenance facility for the future network would be built on the disused Rozelle railway yards. The cost of the project was initially estimated at $2 billion, but this later grew to $7 billion.

Stage 1, which would build the first section of "Line 1" was to feature stations at:

- Rozelle
- White Bay (future station site)
- Pyrmont
- Barangaroo–Wynyard
- Martin Place
- Town Hall Square
- Central

Town Hall Square was to be a new station opposite Sydney Town Hall and beside the existing underground Town Hall railway station, on a site bounded by George, Park and Pitt streets. At ground level, the buildings above, including the existing Woolworths outlet, would be demolished to make way for a new pedestrian plaza to be built by the City of Sydney.

==== Stage 2: West Metro ====
The second stage of the metro network was an extension of line 1 from Central to Olympic Park. (A parallel private-sector proposal supported by the federal Labor Government, Dutch bank ABN AMRO and Australian construction company Leighton Holdings called Western FastRail was ruled out at the same time.) Two alignments were considered: one via Five Dock, West Homebush Bay and Camellia; and another to the south via Auburn. The former won out, with an additional station proposed for Silverwater. The project cost was estimated at $6–8 billion, and the construction timeframe eight to 10 years.

The federal government remained enthusiastic, allocating $20 million for investigation works for the project in early 2008. Their state counterparts cancelled the project in November. Undeterred, federal treasurer Wayne Swan allocated a further $91 million to the project the following year.

Stage 2 was to feature stations at:

- Broadway–University of Sydney
- Camperdown
- Leichhardt
- Five Dock
- Burwood
- Strathfield
- Sydney Olympic Park

==== Future stages ====
Additional stages were factored into the long-term planning for the network, though these never advanced beyond the early investigation stage. The first of these would have extended line 1:

- Stage 3 would have extended line 1 from Rozelle to the Main North line at Epping. With an estimated cost (in 2009 dollars) of $4.8 billion, stage 3 was planned for completion by 2018 and would have featured new stations at Drummoyne, Gladesville, Monash Park, Field of Mars Reserve in East Ryde, Macquarie Park, a new M2 parkway and Epping.
- Stage 4 would have further extended line 1 from Epping to the Richmond line at Schofields. With an estimated cost of $6.7 billion, stage 4 was planned for completion in 2020 and would have featured new stations at Cherrybrook, Castle Hill, Hills Centre, Norwest, both Burns Road and Samantha Riley Drive in Kellyville, Rouse Hill and Schofields.
- Stage 5 would have completed line 1 with a new section from Olympic Park to Westmead. With an estimated cost of $3.0 billion, stage 5 was planned for completion in 2024 and would have featured new stations at Silverwater, Camellia, Parramatta and Westmead.

In the 2020s, work was to begin on further lines:

- Stage 6 – a new line 2 from Martin Place to Malabar by 2027, at an estimated 2009 cost of $5.3 billion, with stations at Museum, Central, Surry Hills, Waterloo, the University of New South Wales, Randwick, Randwick Barracks, Maroubra Junction, Matraville and Malabar
- Stage 7 – extend line 2 from Martin Place to Dee Why by 2031, at an estimated 2009 cost of $5.8 billion, with stations at Macquarie Place (or Circular Quay), Victoria Cross, North Sydney Oval, Neutral Bay, Spit Junction, Manly Vale, Westfield Warringah Mall and Dee Why
- Stage 8 – a new line 3 from Macquarie Park to Olympic Park by 2033, at an estimated 2009 cost of $3.2 billion, with stations at Macquarie Park, Quarry Road, Top Ryde City, Rhodes and Sydney Olympic Park
- Stage 9 – extend line 3 from Olympic Park to Hurstville by 2036, at an estimated 2009 cost of $3.4 billion, with stations at Flemington, Strathfield West, Enfield, Campsie, Clemton Park, Kingsgrove, Stoney Creek Road and Hurstville.

=== Criticism ===
The CBD metro had been criticised by both the head of RailCorp and the NSW Property Council as using a much-needed protected corridor for the proposed additional heavy rail corridor through the CBD of Sydney. This line, it is claimed, would be needed to provide extra capacity on the CityRail network to ease congestion and allow growth into the future. The Sydney Morning Herald reported that transport minister David Campbell had admitted the CBD Metro would run up to 87% empty during peak hour on its opening in 2015 and up to 76% empty in 2031. During peak hour, the CBD Metro is projected to carry 4,000 to 5,500 passengers per hour in 2015 and 7,250 passengers per hour in 2031 out of a full capacity of 30,000 passengers per hour. The dumped, alternative proposal for a second heavy rail harbour crossing running between Redfern and Chatswood would have incurred a similar cost but was projected to carry 16,000 passengers per hour, more than four times the CBD metro.

In a scathing editorial published soon after the CBD Metro announcement, the Herald wrote that "for the Rees Government, heir to a decade's dithering over transport by its predecessors, more dithering is political death. Giving up on the CBD metro is akin to Stalin abandoning Stalingrad to the Wehrmacht – completely, utterly, absolutely unthinkable. Everything must be sacrificed to it ..."

== Cancellation ==
We've listened to the community and made a tough decision.

— Kristina Keneally, 21 February 2010

Sydney Metro was cancelled in February 2010, with premier Kristina Keneally saying "We've listened to the community and made a tough decision," and pledging to reimburse tenderers and property owners for losses incurred as a result of the work that had occurred to that point. Keneally announced a $50 billion transport plan to replace the metro project, including a new heavy rail line under the CBD. Legislation to remove references to the Sydney Metro Authority was enacted later that year.

Keneally's plan abandoned the rapid transit concept altogether in favour of extensions to the existing heavy rail network, starting with a so-called CBD Relief Line to reduce congestion at city-centre stations. Keneally lost office just over a year later, with the relief line unbuilt.

Iemma's plan was prescient in that it closely resembled the plan ultimately adopted four years later by his political opponents – even down to the reliance on funding from electricity asset sales. Yet Iemma had failed to bring his party with him: as late as 2015, Labor was still fighting against power privatisation, while its parliamentarians warned that driverless metro trains might be unsafe.

In 2012, Sydney's Rail Future, the basis for the Liberal/Nationals government's railway planning, implicitly criticises Labor's approach, noting that:

In the Sydney context an independent metro system would deliver few benefits in terms of service enhancement, capacity improvements or better operating efficiency on the existing rail network. A dedicated metro-style system would not maximise the use of the existing rail assets. It would create a separate system that would divert funding away from service improvements on the existing rail network and only provide benefits to customers who use the new lines.

The Sydney's Rail Future plan instead outlined a hybrid model of new rapid transit lines, conversion of existing heavy rail to rapid transit and enhancement of existing heavy rail, particularly on the congested Western Line.

== See also ==
- Sydney Metro, first opened in 2019
- Proposed railways in Sydney
