= CBD =

CBD commonly refers to:

- Cannabidiol, a drug component of cannabis
- Central business district, of a city

CBD may also refer to:

== Biology ==
=== Ecology ===
- Center for Biological Diversity, United States
- Coffee berry disease, a plant fungal infection
- Convention on Biological Diversity, a treaty

=== Medicine ===
- Chronic Beryllium Disease or Berylliosis, a disease of the lungs
- Common bile duct, in hepatology
- Compulsive buying disorder, in psychology
- Corticobasal degeneration, of the brain

== Businesses ==
- CBD Media, a phone directory publisher in Ohio, US
- Christianbook, formerly Christian Book Distributors, Massachusetts, US
- GPA (company), a Brazilian retailer (NYSE: CBD)

== Military ==
- Car Nicobar Air Force Base, Andaman and Nicobar Islands, India (IATA:CBD)
- Construction Battalion Detachment, of the US Navy
- Chesapeake Bay Detachment, a US Naval Research Laboratory site

== Other uses ==
- CBD-FM, a Canadian public radio station
- Chemical bath deposition, used to deposit thin film onto surfaces
- Components-based development, in software engineering
- Brazilian Sports Confederation, known as the Confederação Brasileira de Desportos in Portuguese

== See also ==
- CBD-DMH, a synthetic cannabidiol
- CBD Rail Link (disambiguation)
