= Rouse Hill Town Centre =

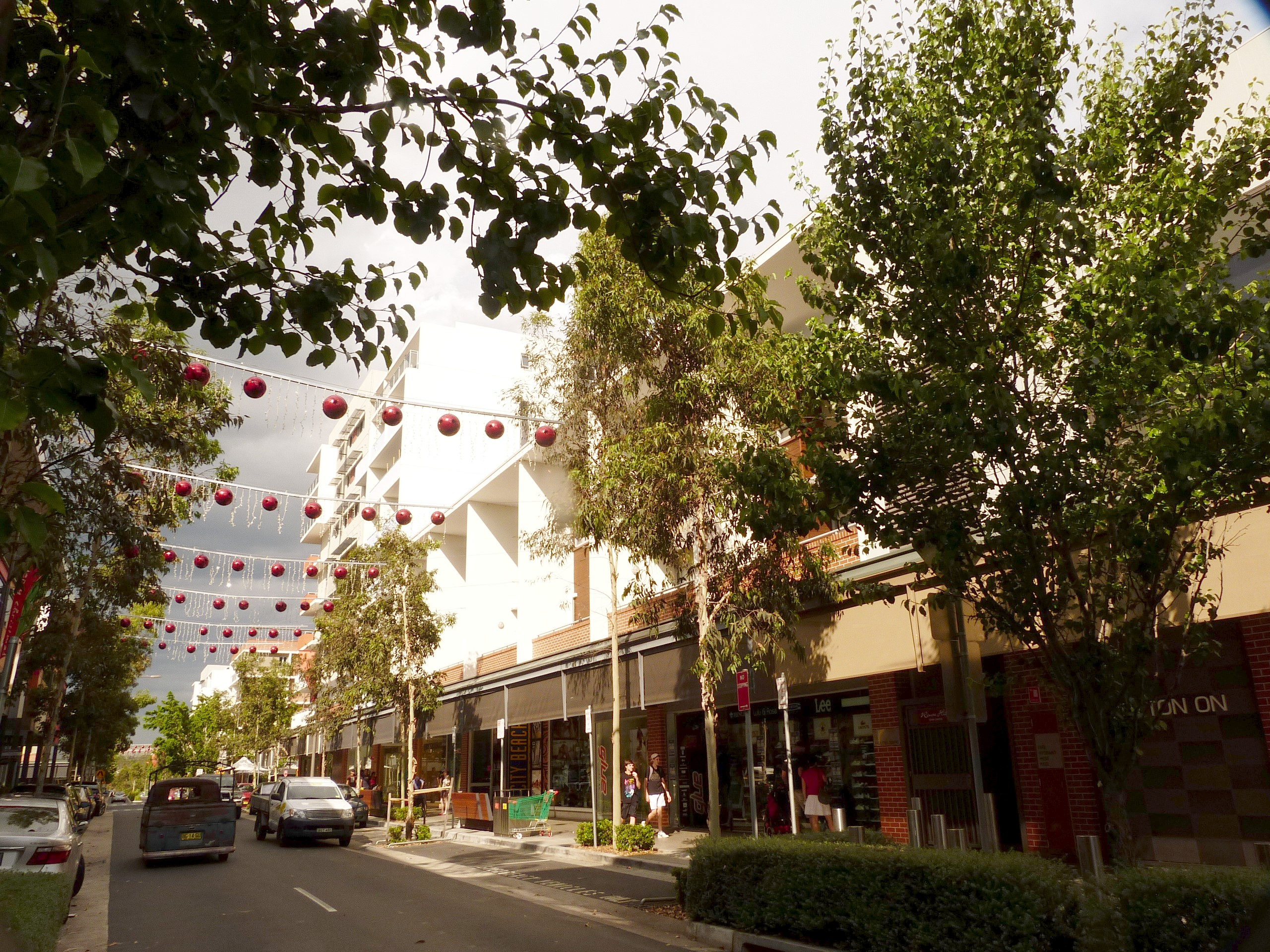
- Main Street
- Location: Rouse Hill, New South Wales, Australia
- Opened: 6 March 2008; 18 years ago
- Developer: GPT Group
- Manager: GPT Group
- Owner: GPT Group
- Num. of stores: 245
- Num. of anchor tenants: 5
- Floor area: 69,700 m^{2} (750,000 sq ft)
- Floors: 1
- Parking: 3,000
- Public transit: Rouse Hill station
- Website: www.rhtc.com.au

Rouse Hill Town Centre (commonly referred to as RHTC) is a shopping centre in the suburb of Rouse Hill in the Hills District of Sydney, New South Wales. The centre is part of a larger development proposal for the Rouse Hill Regional Centre.

Unlike many shopping centres in Australia, Rouse Hill Town Centre is a true town centre with streets, a Town Square, outdoor dining and a mix of indoor and outdoor spaces. The centre features high ceilings and has no doors between indoor and outdoor sections. The centre is divided into four quadrants. Each quadrant has its own distinct range of stores, and all four quadrants meet at an area known as the Town Square. From the Town Square, the Main Street and Civic Way branch out to separate the four quadrants. Its main competitors are Castle Towers and Westpoint Blacktown both about 10 km away.

The centre comprises a number of major retailers, as well as cafes, fine dining and entertainment venues.

== Staging ==
The first stage including a Coles and Woolworths supermarket, along with 80 speciality stores, a food terrace, and fruit and vegetable market opened on 25 September 2007.

The second stage opened on 6 March 2008, which included the opening of major shops such as Target, Big W, Reading Cinemas along with more speciality stores. A library and community centre, commercial office space and a special learning precinct have also been created. In February 2021 Target left the centre and was replaced by Kmart.

GPT Group have announced on 5 March 2025 that a $200 million expansion of the centre will begin in April 2025 including 10,600 square metres of retail space, a new mall, new specialty stores, car spaces and other additions. The redevelopment is expected to be completed towards the end of 2026.

== Transport ==
Rouse Hill Town Centre is adjacent to Rouse Hill station on the Metro North West & Bankstown Line. Bus services are operated by Busways and CDC NSW from an adjoining bus station.
