= Rouse Hill metro station =

Sydney Metro railway station

Rouse Hill
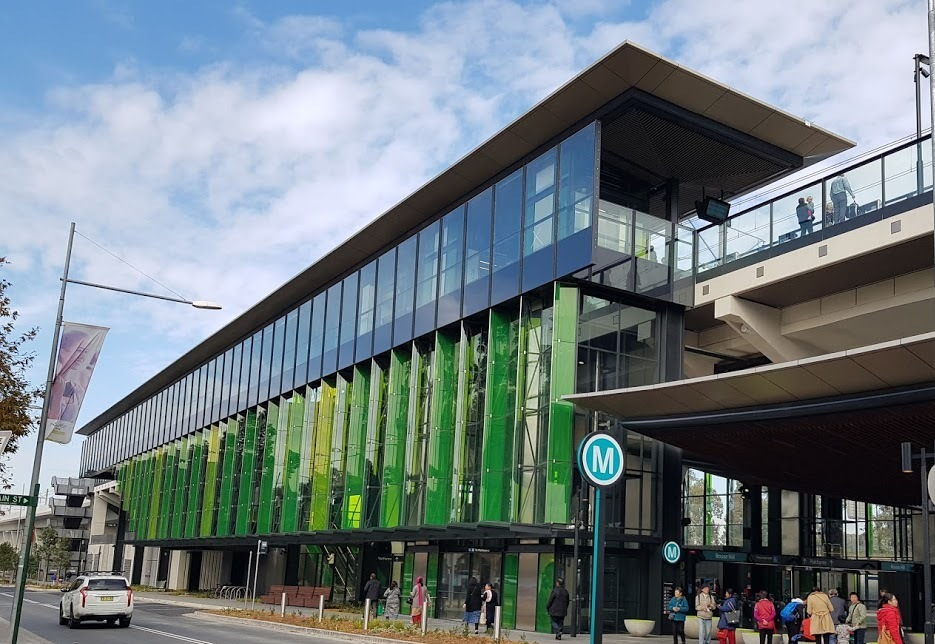
- Rouse Hill station entrance, June 2019

General information
- Location: Tempus Street, Rouse Hill; New South Wales; Australia
- Coordinates: 33°41′29″S 150°55′25″E
- Elevation: 12 m (39 ft) above ground level
- Owner: New South Wales Government via Transport Asset Manager of New South Wales
- Operator: Metro Trains Sydney
- Distance: 32km from Chatswood
- Platforms: 2
- Connections: Bus

Construction
- Structure type: Elevated
- Cycle facilities: 40 spaces
- Accessible: Yes

History
- Opened: 26 May 2019

Passengers
- 2023: 1,883,630 (year); 5,161 (daily) (Sydney Metro)

Services
Preceding station	Sydney Metro	Following station
Tallawong Terminus	M1 Metro North West & Bankstown Line	Kellyville towards Bankstown
Location

Rouse Hill railway station is an elevated Sydney Metro station on Tempus Street in Rouse Hill, New South Wales, Australia. The station serves the Metro North West & Bankstown Line and was built as part of the Sydney Metro Northwest project.

The station opened on 26 May 2019, with initial services to Chatswood and Tallawong. In August 2024, the line was extended from Chatswood to Sydenham, running through the Sydney CBD. The line was finally extended to Bankstown on 30 October 2026, with proposals to extend towards Marsden Park.

== Background ==
Then-rural Rouse Hill was identified by Sydney's 1988 metropolitan strategy, Sydney Into Its Third Century, as an area for future development. Under the previous 1968 strategy, new Western Sydney suburbs could only be formed within the broad corridors formed by the suburban rail system. In approving Sydney Into Its Third Century, Planning Minister Bob Carr abolished this guideline: henceforth new areas such as Rouse Hill could be developed far from rail lines, provided space was left for future transport infrastructure.

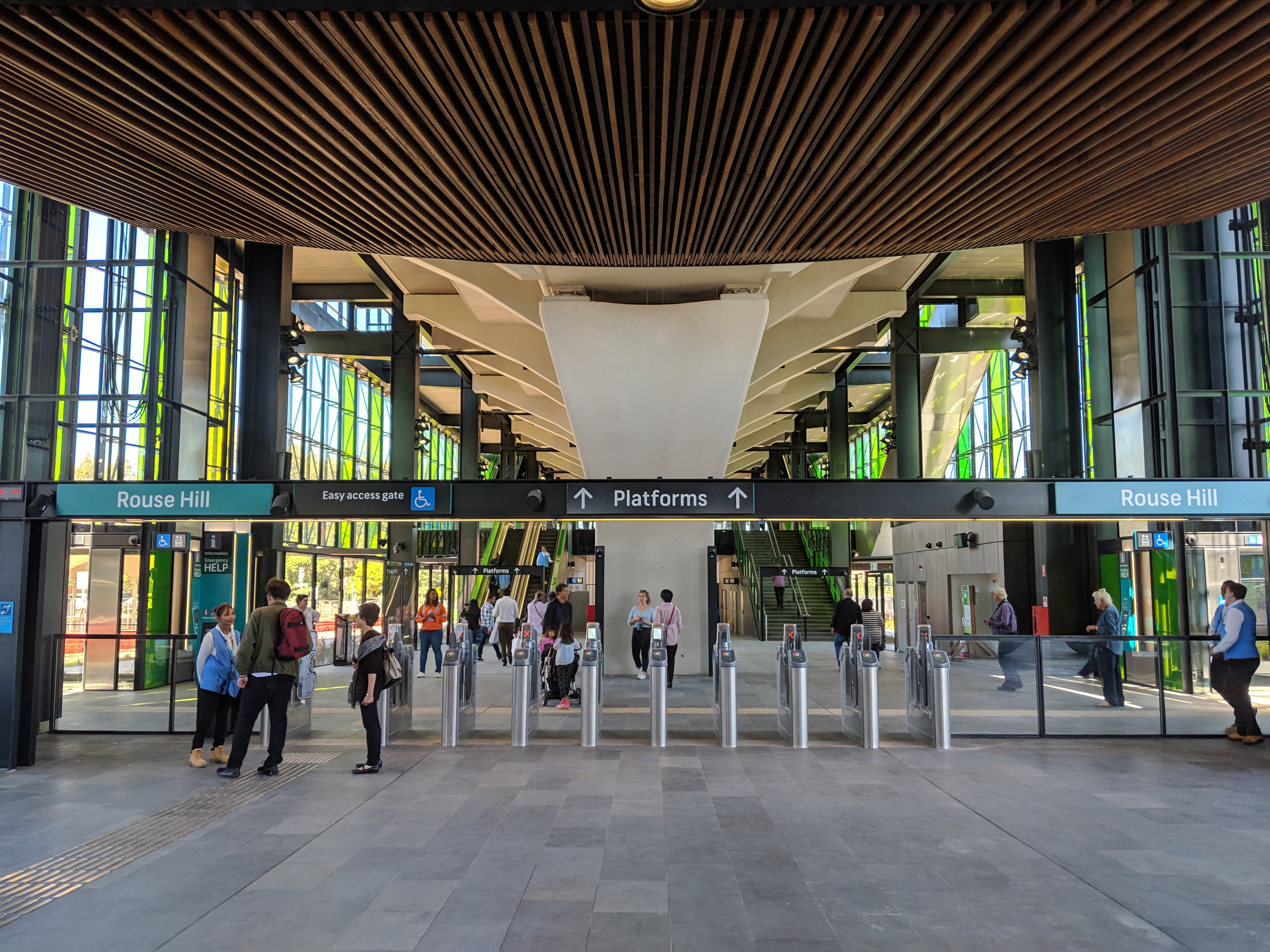
Entrance and ticket barriers

A decade later, as the region began to grow, Carr had risen to become premier, and sought solutions to the new suburbs' transport problems. The Government's public transport strategy, Action for Transport 2010, released in 1998, proposed a new railway line from the existing suburban network at Epping to Castle Hill. From Castle Hill, the plan said, passengers would change onto a new bus rapid transit system, to be built using the district's hitherto-vacant transport corridors. Both the Castle Hill rail and busway projects were promised for 2010: only the busway eventuated, and only in part.

The 1998 plan listed the extension of the Castle Hill line to Rouse Hill as a priority for the decade 2010-20. From then on, a Rouse Hill Station appeared in successive north-western rail proposals, including the "Long-Term Plan for Rail" in 2001, the Metropolitan Rail Expansion Plan in 2005, and a short-lived metro proposal in 2008. As of 2011, nothing had been built besides the Rouse Hill to Parramatta section of the busway network.

Following a change of government, work on the North West Rail Link commenced in 2013.

== Design and construction ==
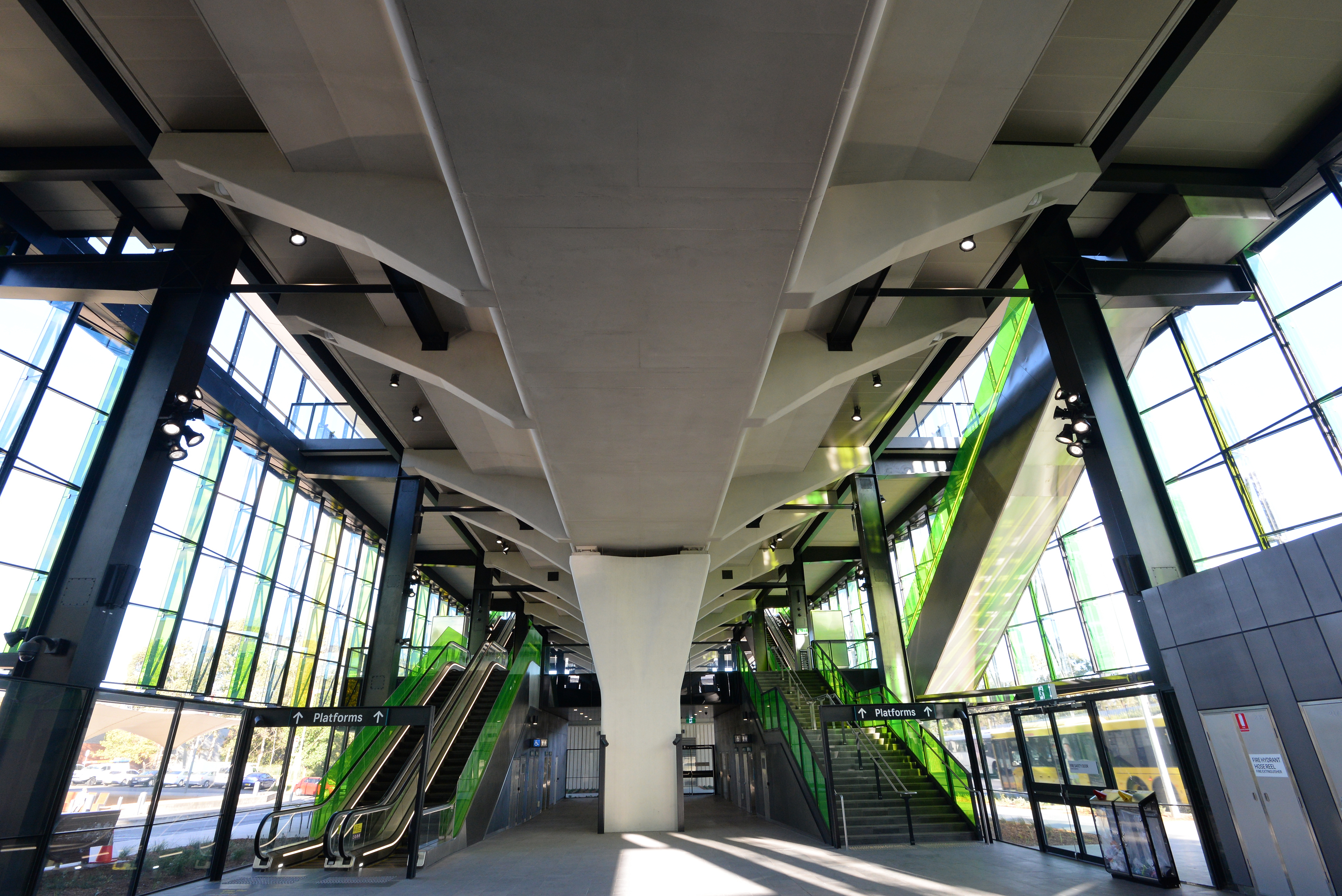
Concourse

Under its $3.7 billion "Operations, Trains and Systems" contract with Transport for NSW, NRT is responsible for the design, construction, fit-out and operation of the new station.

The station is located just to the south of the Windsor Road rail bridge. This structure, a cable-stayed suspension bridge designed by Italian civil firm Salini Impregilo, is a visual icon for the district. Both opened 26 May 2019.

== Services ==
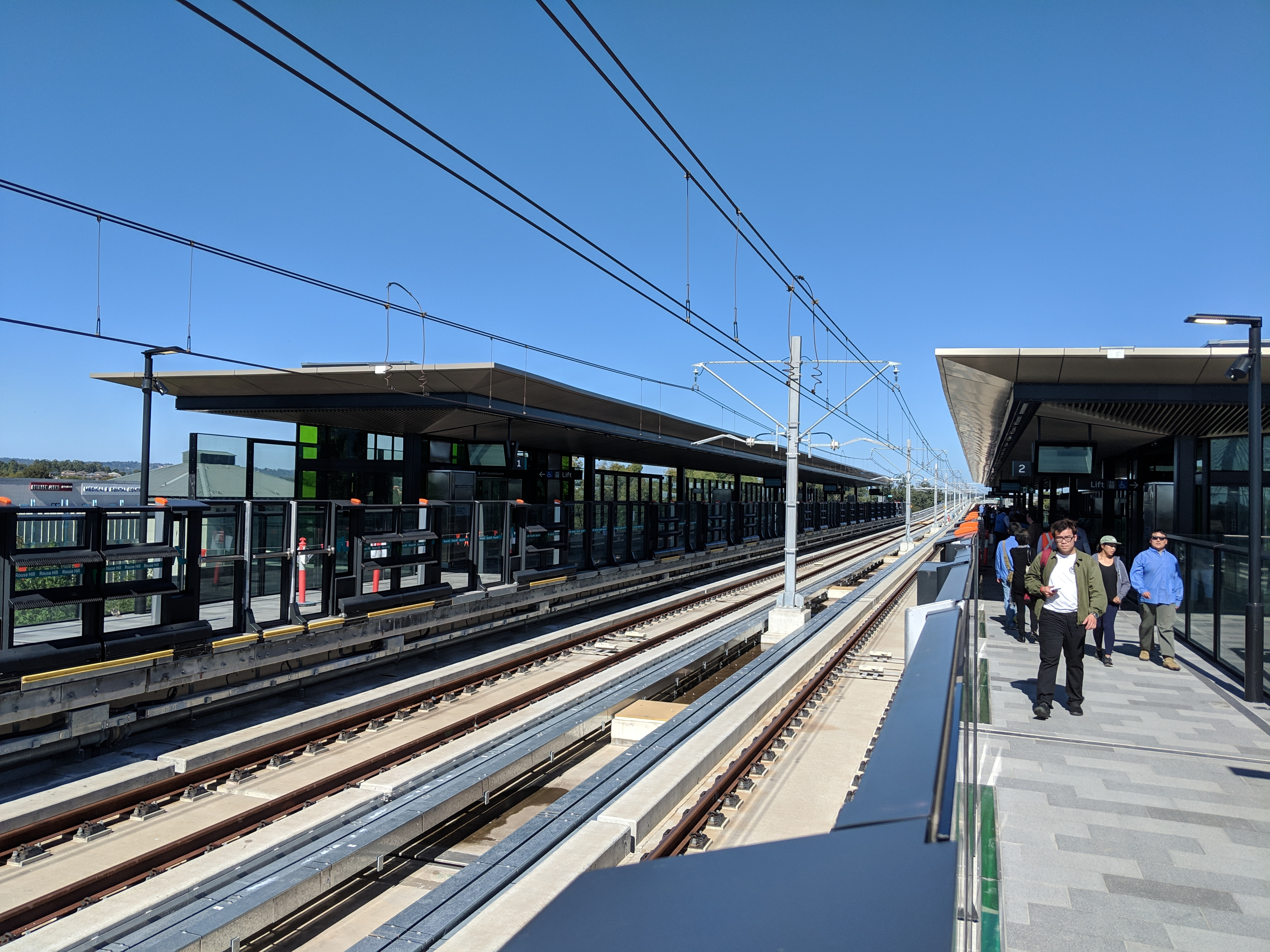
Platforms

Rouse Hill has two side platforms. It is served by Metro North West & Bankstown Line services. Rouse Hill station is served by a number of bus routes operated by Busways and CDC NSW.

Platform	Line	Stopping pattern	Notes
1	M1 Metro North West & Bankstown Line	Services to Sydenham	
2	M1 Metro North West & Bankstown Line	Services to Bankstown	
