= Epping to Chatswood rail link =

Rail tunnel in New South Wales

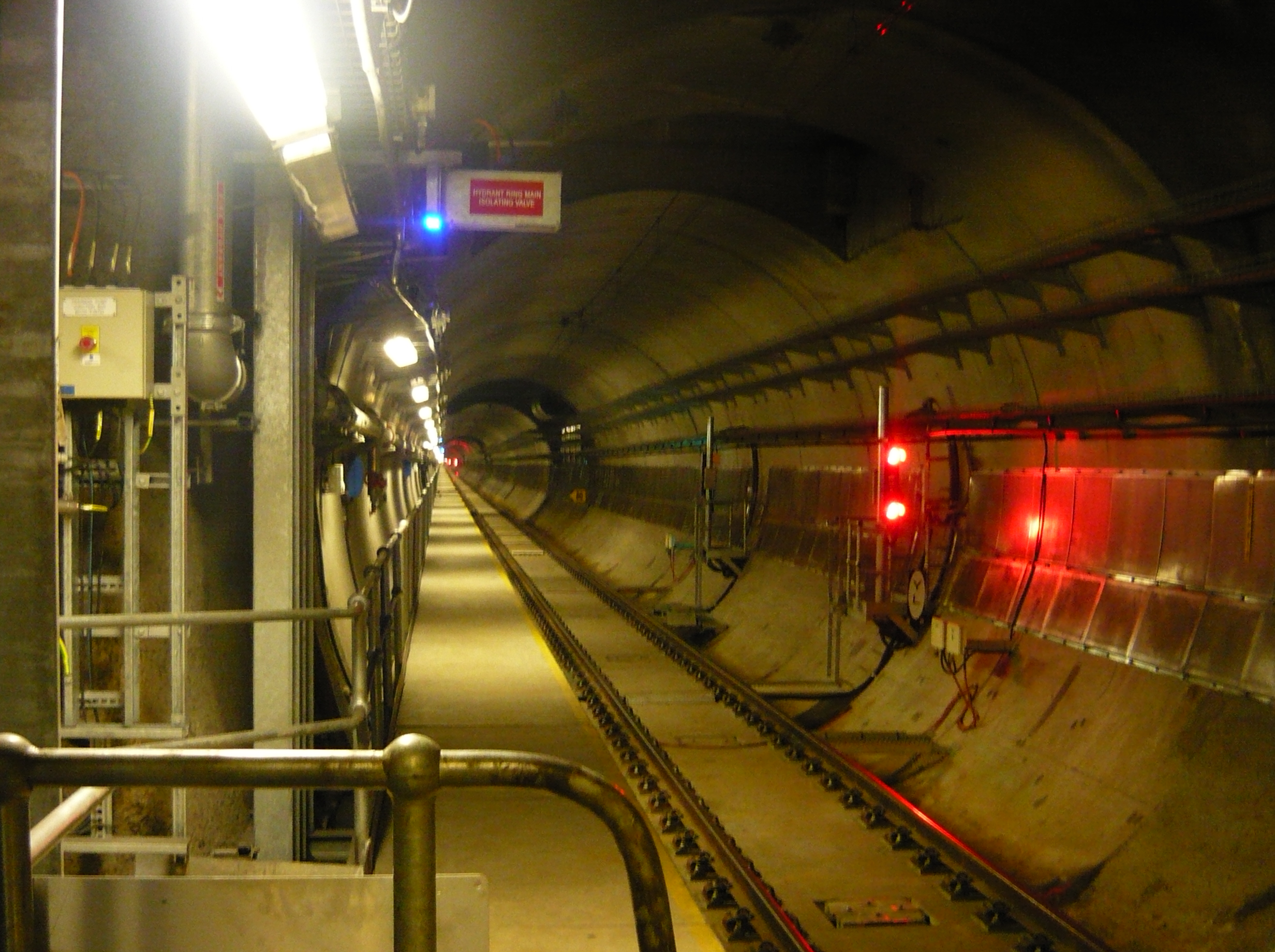
- The tunnel at Macquarie University station, before conversion to metro

Overview
- Owner: Transport Asset Manager
- Locale: Sydney, New South Wales, Australia
- Termini: Chatswood; Epping
- Stations: 5

Service
- System: Sydney Metro
- Operator: Metro Trains Sydney
- Rolling stock: Metropolis Stock

History
- Opened: 23 February 2009
- Closed: 29 September 2018
- Reopened: 26 May 2019

Technical
- Line length: 13 km (8.1 mi)
- Track gauge: 1,435 mm (4 ft 8 1/2 in)
- Electrification: 1,500 V DC from overhead lines

The Epping to Chatswood rail link is a rail tunnel connecting Chatswood station to Epping station in Sydney, News South Wales, Australia. The tunnel was formerly its own rail line on the Sydney Trains suburban rail network, but it has since been converted for use on the Sydney Metro as part of the M1 Metro North West & Bankstown Line. The Epping to Chatswood rail link consists of two parallel bored tunnels, 12.5 kilometres (7.8 mi) in length, and has three intermediate stations: North Ryde, Macquarie Park and Macquarie University.

The tunnel originated as part of the larger Parramatta Rail Link, which would have linked Parramatta with Chatswood via Epping. The line was approved in 1998, but after major cost escalations, the section between Epping and Parramatta was cancelled in 2001. The main construction contract was awarded to Thiess, Hochtief and Alstom in June 2002 for $858 million; construction began later that year. Tunnel boring commenced in September 2003, with two tunnel boring machines (TBMs) launched from a central construction site near the M2 motorway towards Epping. After the TBMs reached Epping station in July 2004, they were transported back to the launch site, turned around, and launched towards Chatswood station. Tunnel boring was completed in July 2005.

The Epping to Chatswood rail link opened on 23 February 2009, with a final cost of $2.3 billion. A shuttle service between Epping and Chatswood operated for the first one hundred days, after which Northern Line trains ran on the line from Hornsby to Central station and beyond to loop back to Epping station. As part of plans for the North West Rail Link, later renamed Sydney Metro Northwest, a new tunnel was built beyond Epping and the Epping to Chatswood rail link was closed on 29 September 2018 for conversion to metro standards, which included platform screen doors and signalling to allow for driverless trains. The line reopened on 26 May 2019 as part of the M1 Metro North West Line, with services running from Tallawong station on the North West Rail Link to Chatswood station. An extension south from Chatswood station to the Sydney central business district opened on 19 August 2024 as part of the next stage of the metro, the Sydney Metro City & Southwest.

== Earlier proposals ==
There were proposals for a railway between Sydney's North Shore and the Main Northern lines since September 1920, when John Bradfield's plans were put forward for a railway between St Leonards and Eastwood. The proposed route was via the present Parklands Avenue in Lane Cove to the head of Burns Bay, across the Lane Cove River near the present-day public school at North Ryde, and terminated about 20 chains (400 m) north of Eastwood station. After political moves, and potential engineering difficulties with hills south of Eastwood station in the 1930s, the terminus was changed to Epping, where the line became known as the "Epping-St Leonards Railway". To this end, the State Government resumed several of the estate houses in Epping around the present-day Brigg and Albuera Roads for a track to loop the line into the main line and terminate the trains at Epping. When voters in neighbouring Eastwood then complained, the line was proposed to link south of Eastwood, use island platforms at Eastwood and then link to Epping.

In 1929, local real estate agents promoted land sales along the railway line at Epping in preparation for the construction of the line. They called the area "Epping Junction", on account of the station being a junction between the Epping-St Leonards Line and the Main Northern Line. A new island platform was also built in preparation for the terminus of the new line. The track was to be in the middle of the two Main Northern line platforms, and until the 1970s still existed as a terminating line.

The effects of the Great Depression, however, soon meant that the line would not be economically feasible, and despite protests by local residents and the local member, Major Shand, the project was abandoned. In its place, a road was built between St Leonards and Epping, which forms the current Epping Road. The land sales were a complete failure, and the lots around the railway were not sold until the 1950s and 1960s.

It was not until the 1990s that plans for the line were resurrected. An original proposal to run from Westmead to St Leonards, via Epping was considered, but in 1998 the Parramatta Rail Link was announced as part of the NSW Government's Action for Transport 2010 plan. The line was to run from Chatswood through Epping to Parramatta, partially travelling along the underutilised Carlingford surface line which would be expanded from single-track to dual-track. This proposal included optional stations at Delhi Road and UTS Kuring-gai and would be served by eight services an hour. Construction was planned to commence in late 1999, with the line to open in 2006.

== Construction ==
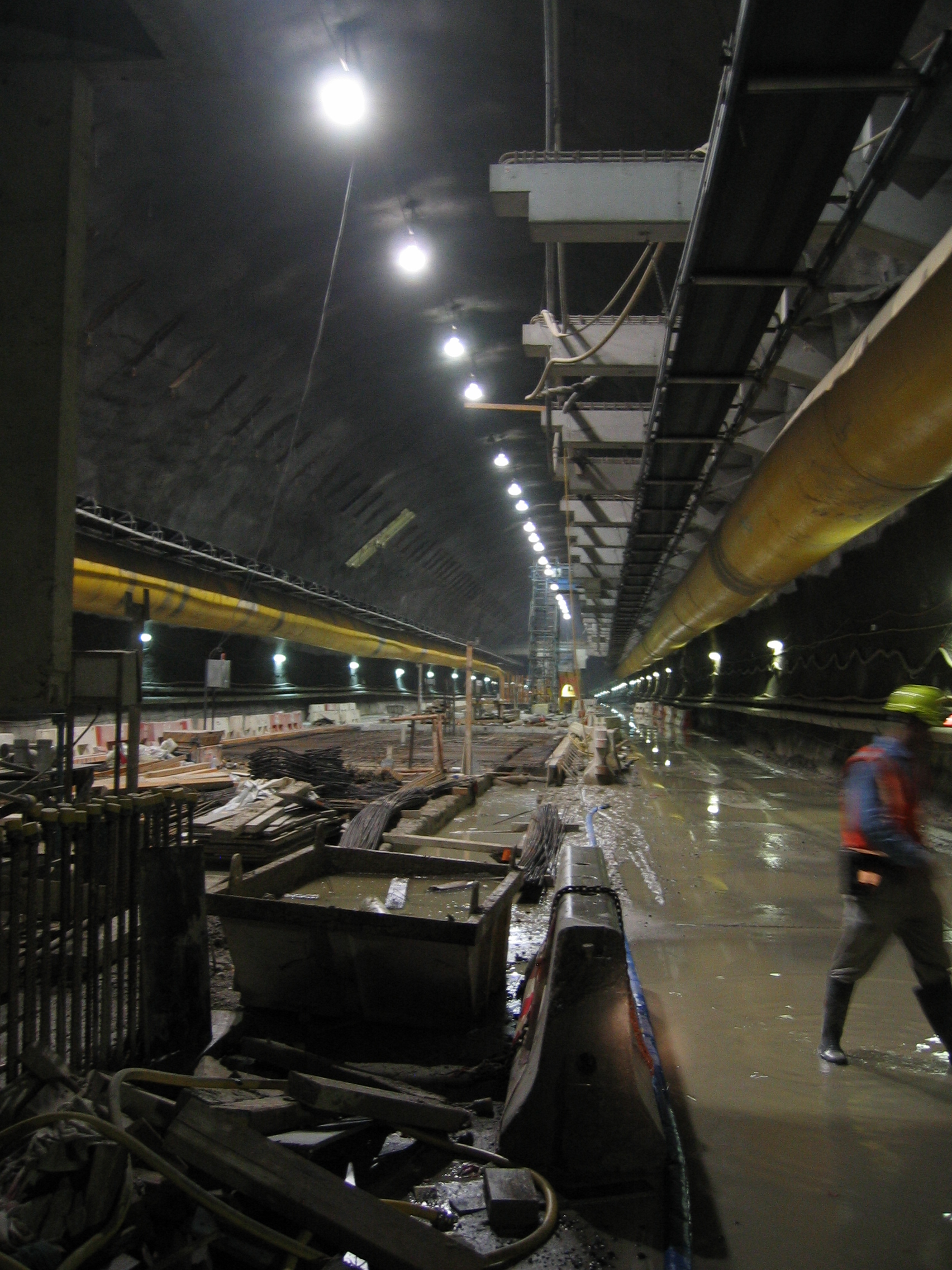
North Ryde station under construction in February 2005

Construction of the PRL began with the Chatswood to Epping section, which commenced in November 2002.

In August 2003, the NSW Transport Minister, Michael Costa, announced that the Epping-Parramatta section would be postponed indefinitely. The delaying of this section was justified on the grounds that the expected daily patronage of 15,000 passenger trips did not justify the project's $1.2 billion cost. The government feared that the line would be under-utilised, much as the Airport Link (a public-private project) had been. There also had been community protest against the routing of the line through Parramatta Park (one of three possible routes supplied by the government). The government later announced the construction of a passing loop as part of the Rail Clearways Program on the Carlingford line, which would have allowed a half-hourly frequency all day, however this project was cancelled in November 2008.

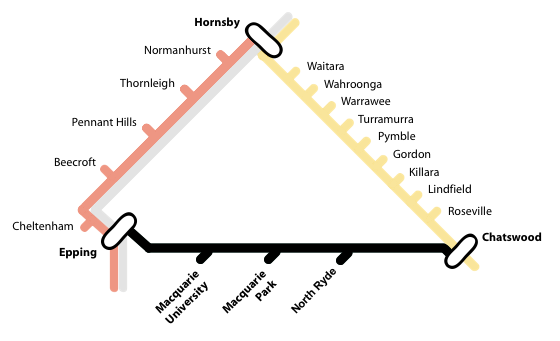
Diagram of Epping to Chatswood Line, in black

Originally, there was to be a bridge over the Lane Cove River, instead of a tunnel beneath it, but the government adopted the tunnel option due to community and environmentalist pressure. This required the elimination of the planned station at the University of Technology Sydney, Ku-ring-gai Campus; the required increased depth of the tunnel to go under the river made a station at that point impractical, due to the required depth of the escalator shafts.

Thiess and Hochtief delivered the project as a joint venture which included the design and construction of a driven railway and four fully mined stations. The line consists of two tunnels – one for each track. The tunnels were constructed using two tunnel boring machines, with a section underneath the Lane Cove River being constructed by the cut and cover method (next to where Delhi Road crosses the River). The line is fully bi-directional, with three crossovers to allow trains to switch tracks in the event of a disruption. The tunnels include a walkway on one side, at platform height.

Several associated works were also completed to coincide with the opening of the new line. These include the rebuilt Chatswood interchange, a major upgrade at Epping, an upgrade of North Sydney station, the Hornsby turnback Rail Clearways project and new substations at Waverton and Beecroft.

=== Issues ===
In December 2007, it was announced that Tangara trains would not be running on the line due to steepness of the tunnel. The line owner, RailCorp, denied that it was an engineering bungle, saying "The Tangara trains, because they are not ideally suited to that steep gradient, will not be allocated to that line even though they can operate." S set trains were also excluded, due to concerns over possible problems performing "push-out" duty (a loaded train pushing out another loaded train) on the gradients. In February 2008 it was revealed that mats, connected to the rail tracks and concrete slabs to reduce noise, had separated and needed to be replaced, with at least half of the 14 km (8.7 mi) of track to be re-laid.

== Initial service ==
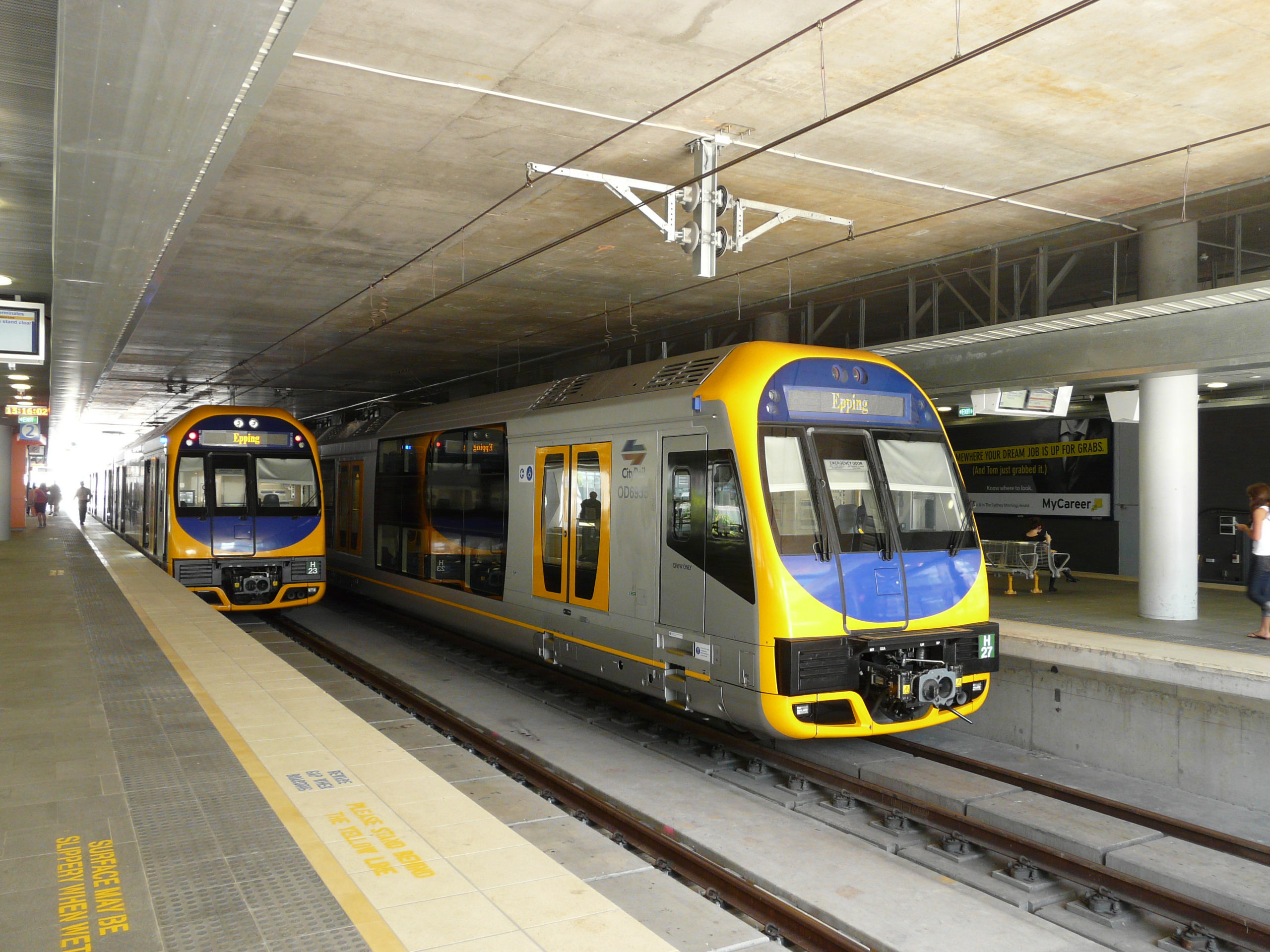
Oscars on the shuttle service at Chatswood

The line opened on 23 February 2009 as a shuttle service between Epping and Chatswood. The launch was moved from 22 February due to a National Day of Mourning for the victims of Victoria's Black Saturday bushfires. The line operated free of charge until 8 June 2009. Initially passengers could use a blue Complementary Pass, or buy a ticket to either Chatswood or Epping if coming from outside the new link. Later on, the automatic gates at the new stations were switched on and passengers were required to "buy" a ticket as usual. A portion of the fare was automatically deducted for passengers travelling to or from stations beyond the new link.

OSCARS (Outer Suburban Cars), were used on the shuttle service, running as four-car sets. These were the newest trains in the fleet and are intended for longer journeys out of the Sydney basin, but were used on the ECRL due to the steepness and noisiness of the tunnel. Other types maintained at Hornsby Maintenance Depot were not used during the shuttle phase, though tests with K sets proved successful. Trains operated at 15-minute intervals, with the last service departing Epping at 9:31 pm. The line was coloured black on CityRail maps and publicity materials during the shuttle period, which ended on 11 October 2009 when a new timetable was introduced.

== Integrated service ==
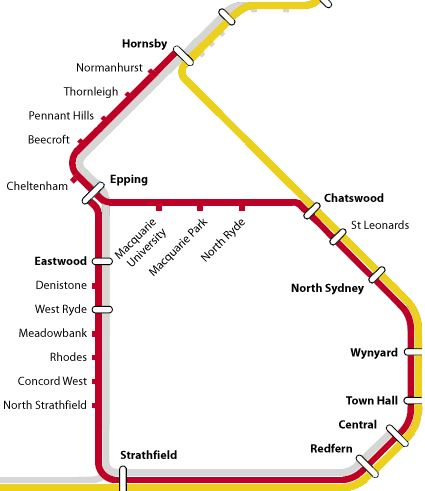
Diagram of the Northern Line, in red, following integration of the Epping to Chatswood Line

Once integrated services commenced, the link became part of the Northern Line. Most Northern Line trains from Hornsby to Epping operated via the new link and then continued along the North Shore Line from Chatswood to the city, before returning to Epping via Strathfield. Trains reversed at Epping's above ground platforms, and followed the opposite route back to Hornsby. Services were operated by K sets, with some OSCARS used during off-peak periods. The timetable had four trains per hour on weekdays between Hornsby and the City via the ECRL. On weekends, 4 trains per hour ran between Hornsby and Chatswood with two of these continuing from Chatswood to the city, and then to Epping via Strathfield.

On 20 October 2013, the Northern Line was replaced by the North Shore, Northern & Western Line. On weekdays, this saw the ECRL served by trains running from Hornsby to Richmond or Emu Plains. On weekends, the Hornsby to Epping loop was retained.

The ECRL was also used by Central Coast & Newcastle Line services if the Main North Line between Strathfield and Epping was affected by trackwork or a major service interruption.

== Conversion to Sydney Metro ==
In February 2010, the New South Wales Government re-announced the North West Rail Link as a branch of Sydney's existing double-deck heavy rail system, connected with the ECRL at Epping.

On 11 August 2010, Prime Minister Julia Gillard announced $2.1 billion in funding for the Epping to Parramatta Rail Link with $520 million to be contributed by the NSW Government. (a revisit of the 1998 NSW Government announcement, which despite a detailed report in 2003 was abandoned earlier in 2010 by the NSW Keneally Government). Work on the line was expected to begin in 2011 and the line was scheduled to be operational by 2017. The state opposition indicated it wished to instead use the federal money to construct the North West Rail Link, should it win the March 2011 state election. The federal government did not support this proposal and said the money should be used to construct the line to Parramatta as it originally proposed. Following the defeat of the Keneally Government in 2011, the proposal was abandoned.

The new O'Farrell Government continued planning for the North West Rail Link. In 2012, it was announced that the project would adopt different technology from Sydney's existing rail system, instead running single-deck automated trains with platform screen doors. The North West Rail Link project – renamed Sydney Metro Northwest – involved the conversion of the existing Epping to Chatswood section to form part of the new Sydney Metro network and allow the new, automated line to run as a shuttle between Tallawong and Chatswood.

The ECRL closed on 29 September 2018 to allow conversion to commence. The conversion of the former ECRL took eight months; temporary bus services were provided during this time. The Metro North West & Bankstown Line, including the five former ECRL stations, opened on 26 May 2019. The former Northern line route from Hornsby to Central via Strathfield was reinstated, and North Shore services that ran on the rail link were amended to operate beyond Chatswood towards Gordon, Hornsby or Berowra.

== Gallery ==
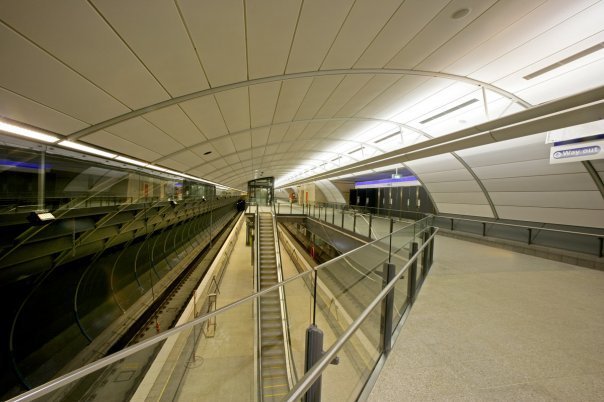
Macquarie Park station concourse under construction

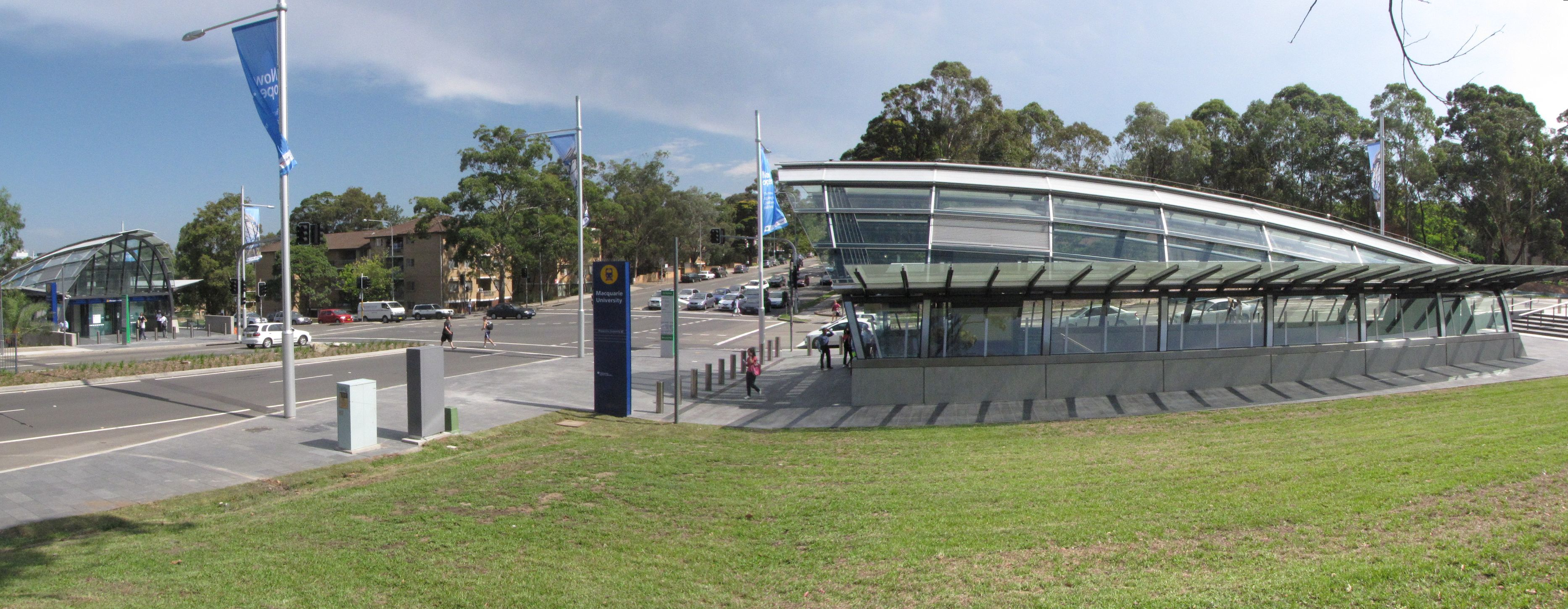
Entrance to Macquarie University station

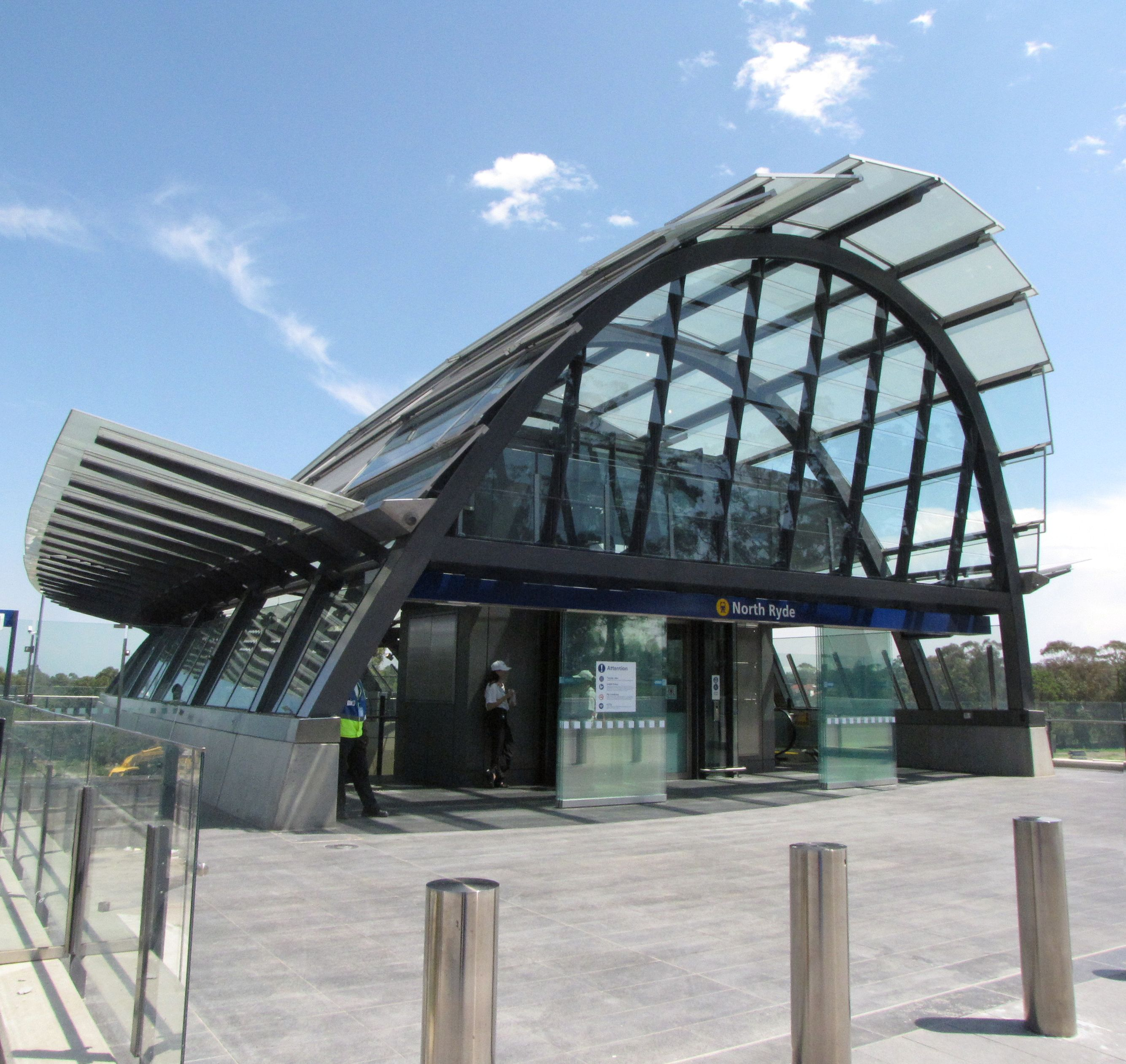
Entrance to North Ryde station

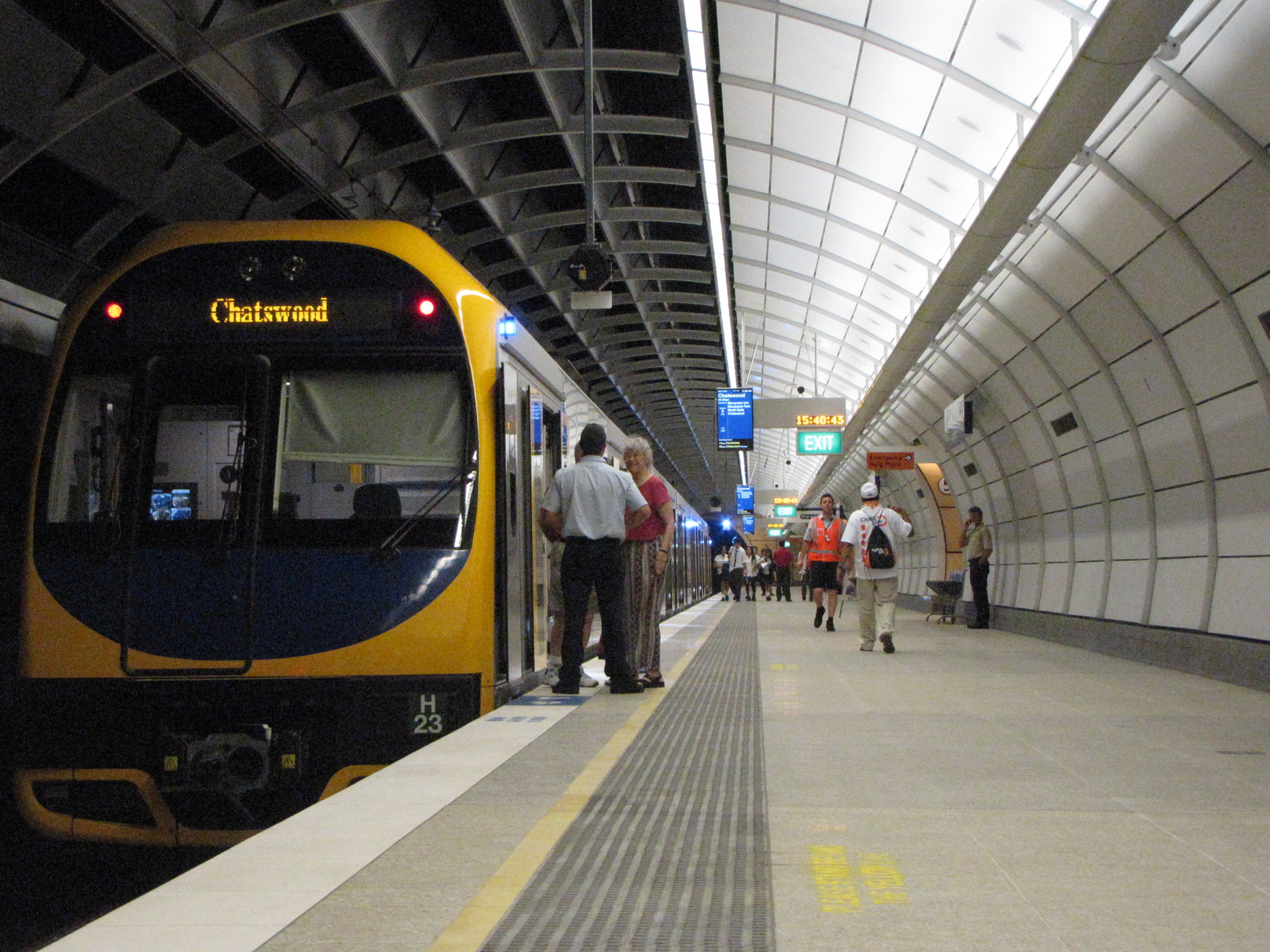
OSCAR set H23 waits to depart on a shuttle service at the underground platforms at Epping

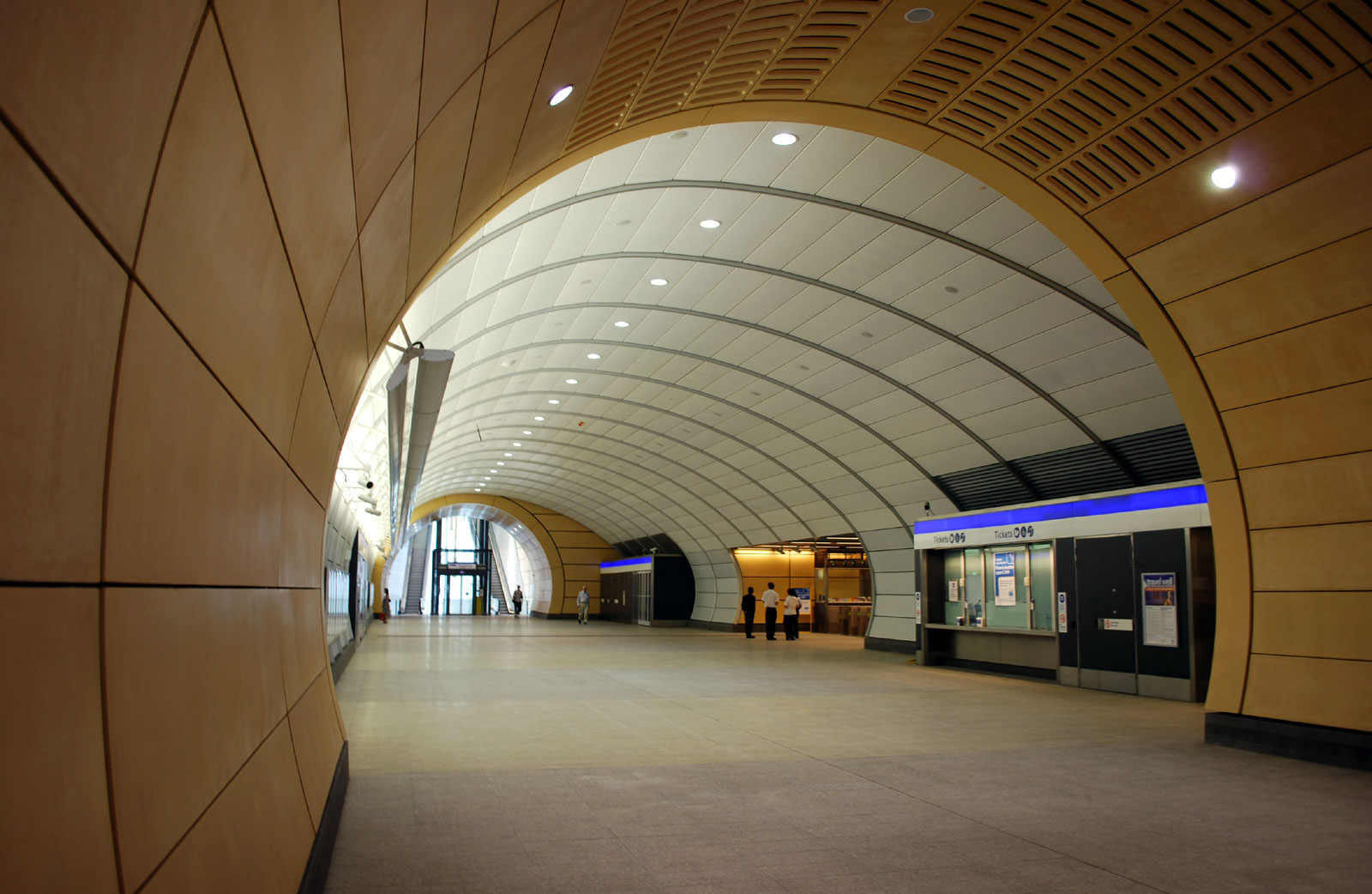
Ticket hall of Macquarie Park station
