= CBD Relief Line =

Proposed underground railway

Overview
- Status: Cancelled
- Locale: Sydney
- Stations: 4-5

Service
- Type: Commuter rail
- Services: 1

History
- Announced: 2010
- Cancelled: 2011

The CBD Relief Line, also known as the Western Express Rail, was a proposed underground railway line through the Sydney central business district. The line was intended to augment the existing city underground network and ease congestion at some of the city's busiest stations. The new line was proposed to link to the Main Suburban railway line, which would have increased that line's capacity.

The line included proposed stations or platforms at Redfern (new platforms), Railway Square, City West and Wynyard (new platforms).

== Earlier proposals ==
In 2005, the Carr Government announced the Metropolitan Rail Expansion Program which consisted of three new lines - the North West Rail Link, South West Rail Link and CBD Rail Link. These three new lines were intended to expand the capacity of the CityRail network and extend it to serve new areas. In 2008, the CBD Rail Link and North West Rail Link were cancelled and replaced by the North West Metro. This was to be an entirely new system with no link to the CityRail network. In 2009, the North West Metro was modified and truncated to form the CBD Metro. In 2010 the CBD Metro was cancelled and replaced by the CBD Relief Line.

== Concept ==
Like the original CBD Rail Link proposal, the CBD Relief Line was intended to be integrated into the CityRail network. The CBD Relief Line was proposed to utilise the MetroWest corridor, terminate at Wynyard and link into the Western line. This differed from the CBD Rail Link which utilised the MetroPitt corridor and crossed the harbour to link into the North Shore and Chatswood to Epping lines to the north and either the Airport or Campbelltown Express lines to the south.

The CBD Relief Line would have connected to the existing network via the "Main" pair of tracks of the Main Suburban line at the Illawarra Junction. The "Mains" can currently only be accessed by suburban trains by means of a flat junction from the "Suburban" pair of tracks, creating a bottleneck and meaning the "Mains" are not used to their full capacity. By removing the need to cross the flat junction, more suburban trains would have been able to use the "Mains" which would have freed up additional capacity on the "Suburbans" and on the existing CBD lines.

The proposed operational arrangement was dubbed "Western Express". This concept envisaged limited stops trains commencing from Wynyard, then utilising the CBD Relief Line, the "Main" pair of tracks on the Main Suburban line and the Western and Richmond lines to provide faster & more frequent travel between the Sydney CBD, the Parramatta CBD and the outer Western Suburbs. The Government claimed this would enable a 5-minute reduction in travel time and a 90% capacity improvement between Wynyard and Parramatta, and a 10-minute reduction in travel time and a 50% capacity improvement between Wynyard and Penrith or the Richmond branch line.

== Cancellation ==
In early 2011, the then Liberal–National state opposition indicated it would defer the project, preferring to instead focus on the North West Rail Link. After winning the March 2011 state election the Liberal–National O'Farrell Government cancelled the project. The Liberal–National government later proposed the Sydney Metro City & Southwest, a metro line that also bypasses existing stations in the CBD.

== See also ==
- Proposed railways in Sydney – other cancelled railway projects in Sydney
- West Metro – an earlier proposal with overlapping aims.
- Western FastRail – a fast rail line between the outer Western Suburbs and the CBD, proposed by the private sector.
- Sydney Metro City & Southwest – a metro line under construction that bypasses existing stations in the CBD
