= Macquarie Park =

- Suburb
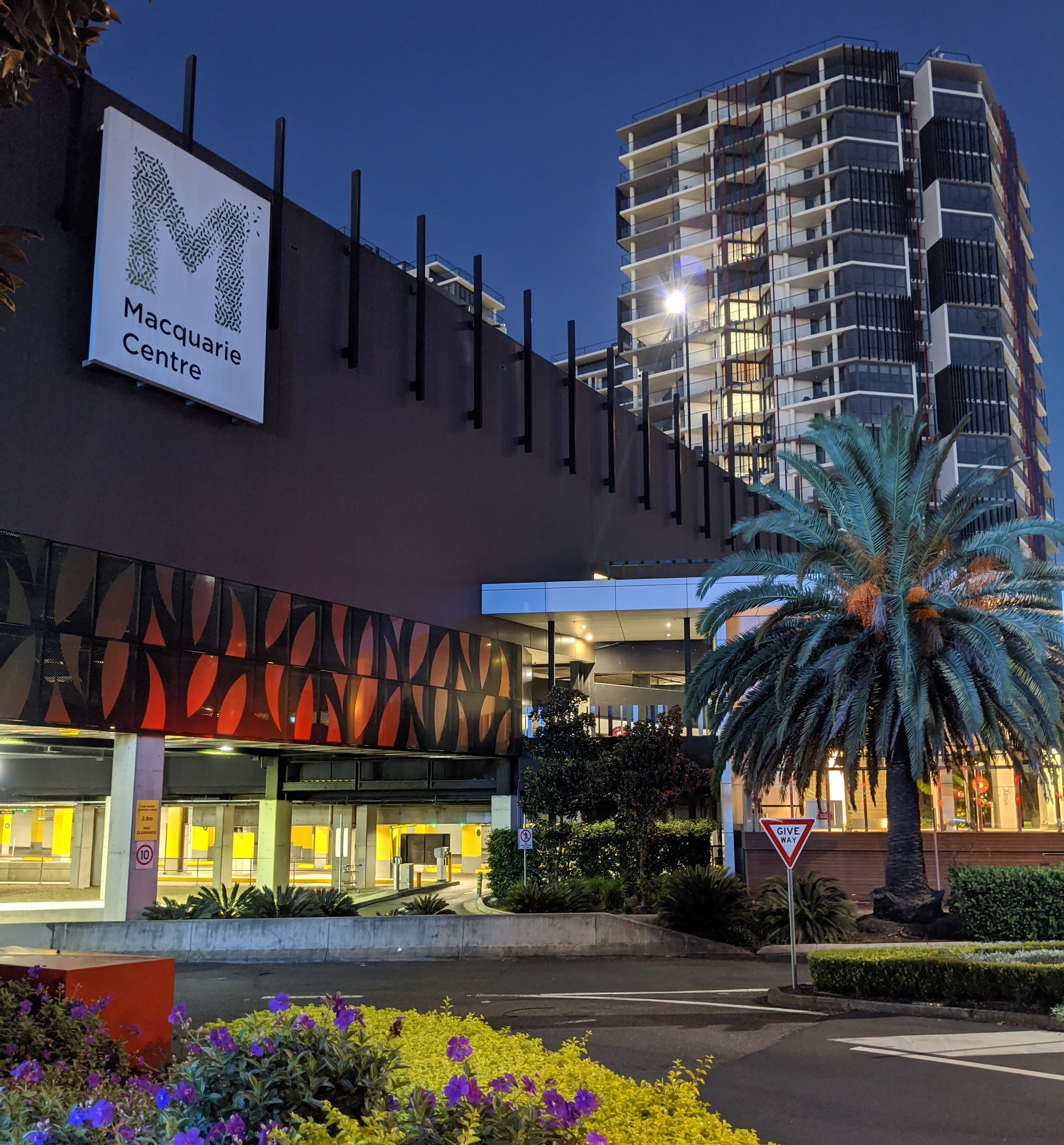
- Macquarie Centre

- Interactive map of Macquarie Park
- Country: Australia
- State: New South Wales
- City: Sydney
- LGA: City of Ryde
- Location: 15 km (9.3 mi) north-west of Sydney CBD
- Established: 5 February 1999

Government
  - State electorate: Ryde, Lane Cove
  - Federal division: Bennelong

Area
  - Total: 6.8 km^{2} (2.6 sq mi)
- Elevation: 52 m (171 ft)

Population
  - Total: 11,071 (SAL 2021)
- Postcode: 2113
Suburbs around Macquarie Park
South Turramurra	West Pymble	Killara
Marsfield	Macquarie Park	Lindfield
North Ryde	North Ryde	Chatswood West

Macquarie Park (/məˈkwɒri/) is a suburb in the Northern Sydney region of Sydney, New South Wales, Australia. Macquarie Park is located 13 kilometres north-west of the Sydney central business district in the local government area of the City of Ryde.

Macquarie Park was part of the suburb of North Ryde until it was gazetted as a suburb in its own right on 5 February 1999, and many businesses still use North Ryde as the address. Both suburbs share the 2113 postcode, but Macquarie University, which is located at the northern part of the suburb, has its own postcode of 2109.

== History ==
=== Aboriginal culture ===
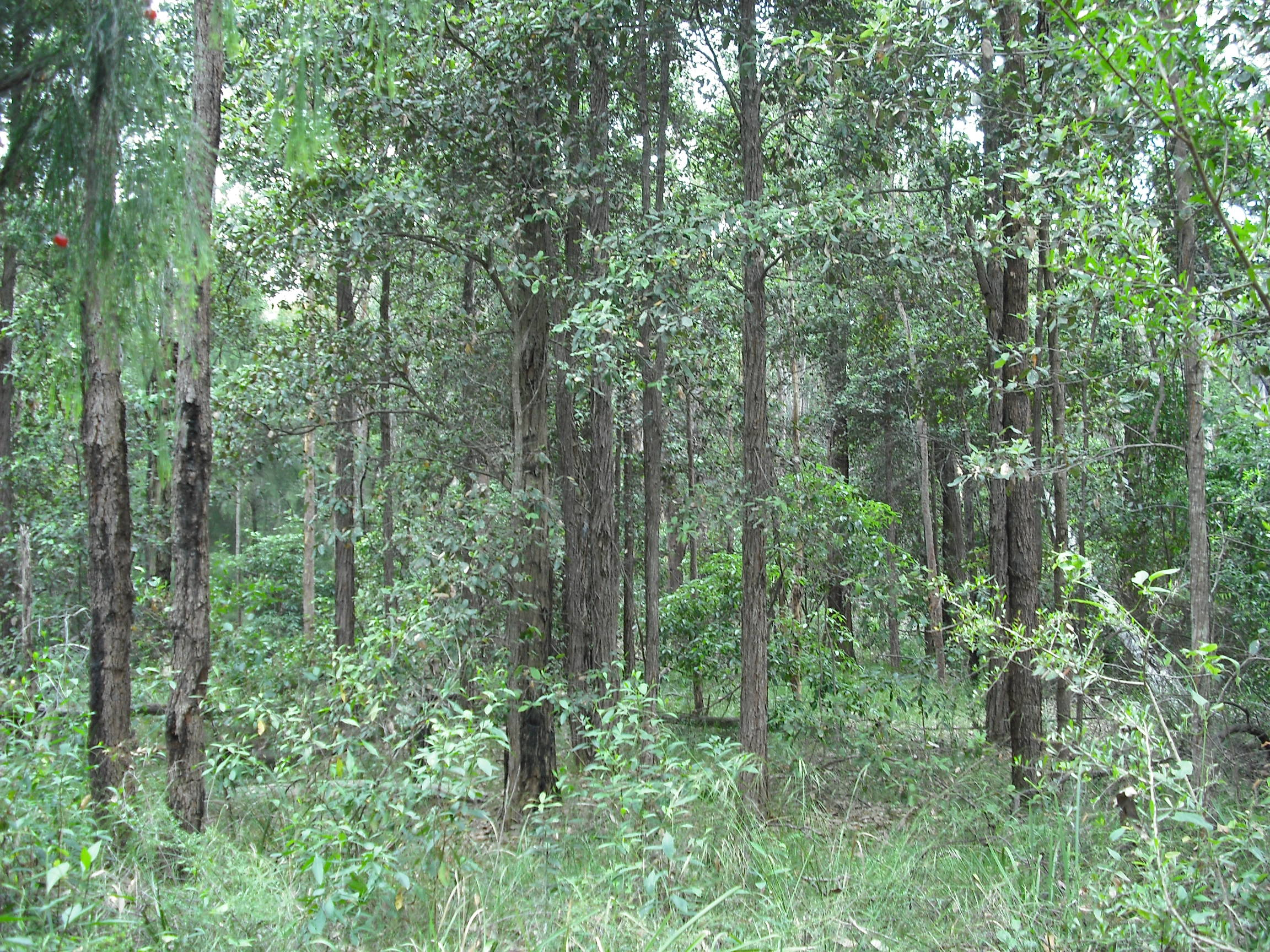
Wallumatta Nature Reserve

The whole area between the Parramatta and Lane Cove rivers was originally known by its Aboriginal name Wallumatta. Contact with the first white settlement's bridgehead into Australia quickly devastated much of the population through epidemics of smallpox and other diseases. Their descendants live on, though their language, social system, way of life and traditions are mostly lost. The Aboriginal name survives in a local reserve, the Wallumatta Nature Reserve, located at the corner of Twin and Cressy roads, North Ryde. Very few remnants of Sydney Turpentine-Ironbark Forest still exist. The most substantial undisturbed area is the Wallumatta Nature Reserve in North Ryde, which is owned and managed by the NSW National Parks & Wildlife Service. This small and critically endangered reserve, also known as the Macquarie Hospital Bushland, is one of the last remnants of the remaining 0.5% (as at 2007) of original and endangered turpentine-ironbark forests on Wianamatta shale soil in Sydney. See Sydney Turpentine-Ironbark Forest.

=== British settlement ===
Macquarie Park is named for Governor Lachlan Macquarie (1762–1824), a British military officer and colonial administrator who served as the Governor of New South Wales from 1810 to 1821. The area that is now Macquarie Park was part of the suburb of North Ryde from the late 19th century. The area was once filled with market gardens, poultry farms and vast tracts of bushland, with many beautiful picnic spots and waterfalls.

=== Suburban development ===
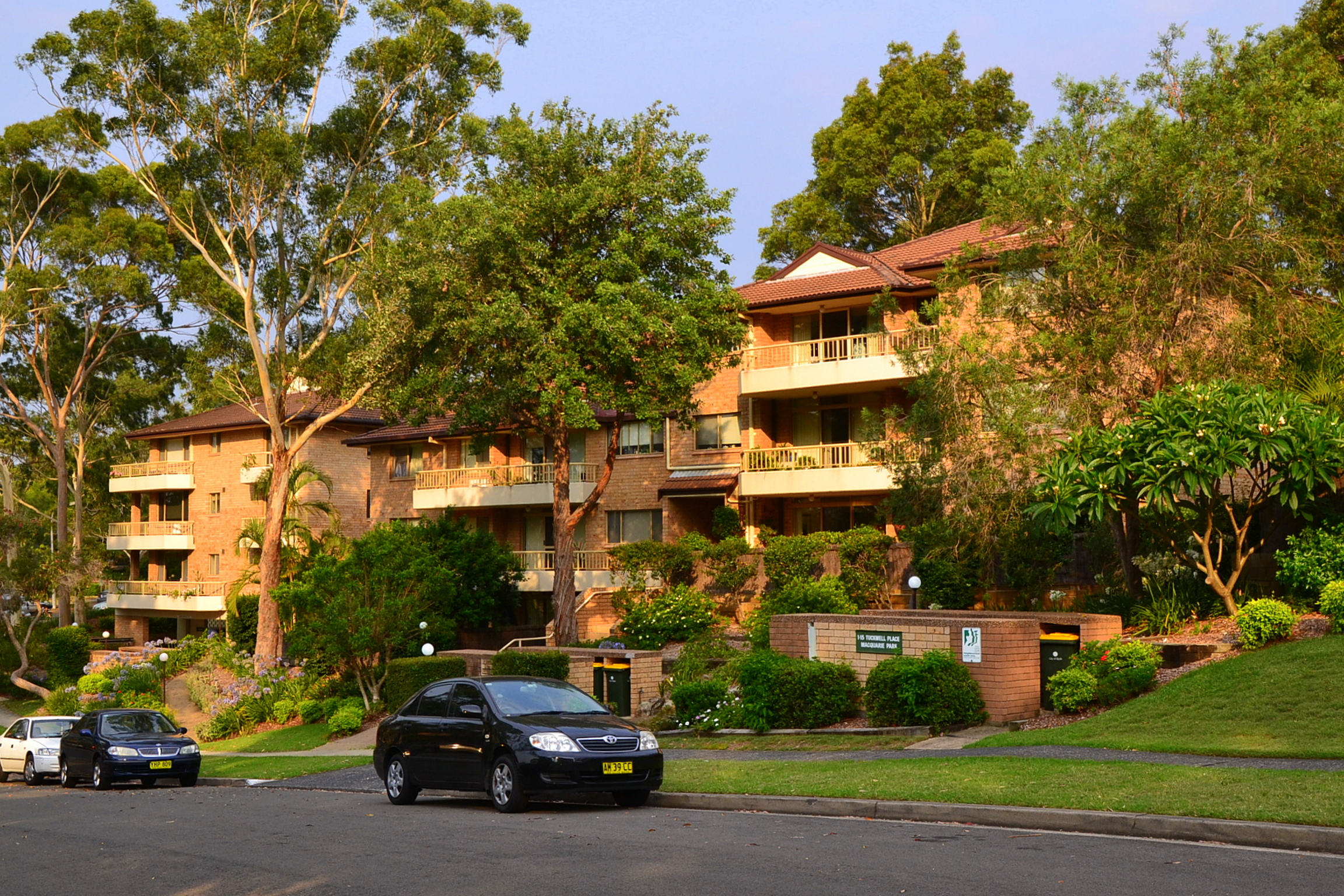
Tuckwell Place

The mid-1960s saw the establishment of Macquarie University and the 'Macquarie Park Employment Area' which saw the rezoning of 'Green Belt' bushland to allow for industrial activities. The initial concept for Macquarie Park was based on the idea of a similar hi-tech industrial area surrounding Stanford University in Palo Alto, California, the goal being to provide for the interaction between industries and the university.

During the 1970s, companies such as AWA, Beiersdorf, Racal and Universal Press located their corporate headquarters in the area. Macquarie Park has since gained a reputation of being a leading high-tech industrial area in Australia. It attracts many local and international companies from high-tech fields including electronic, scientific, computing, medical, communication, pharmaceutical and business supply.

== Economy ==
Macquarie Park is the Northern Suburbs' centre for major commercial and retail districts. The "Sydney global economic corridor", is used to describe a geographical "arch" of Sydney, home to international corporations.

=== Corporate headquarters ===
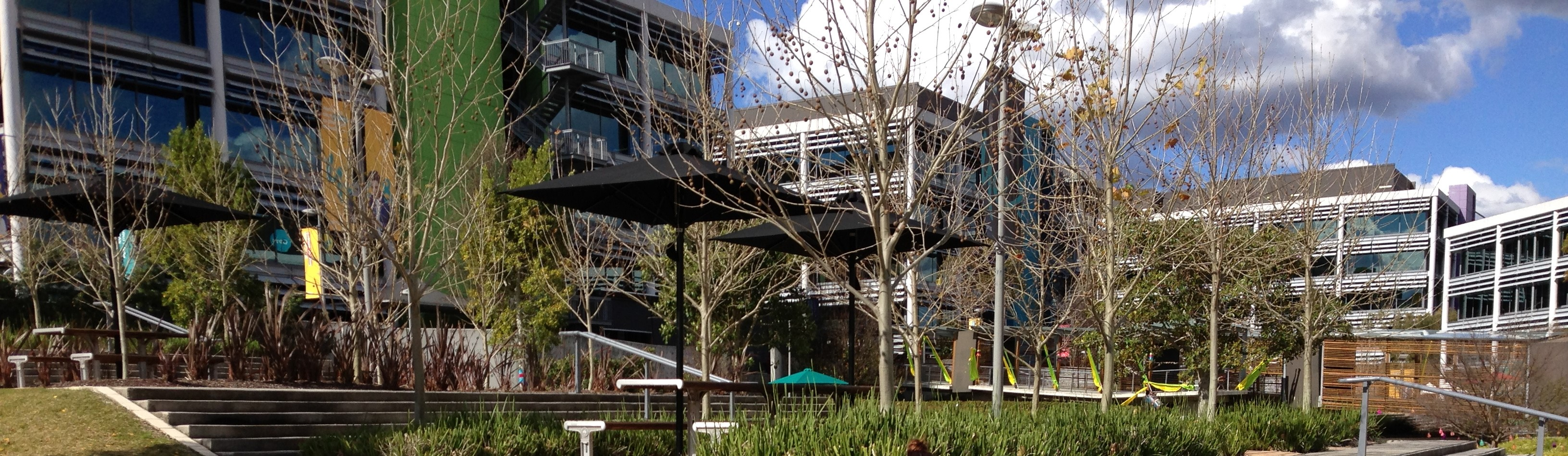
Optus Headquarters

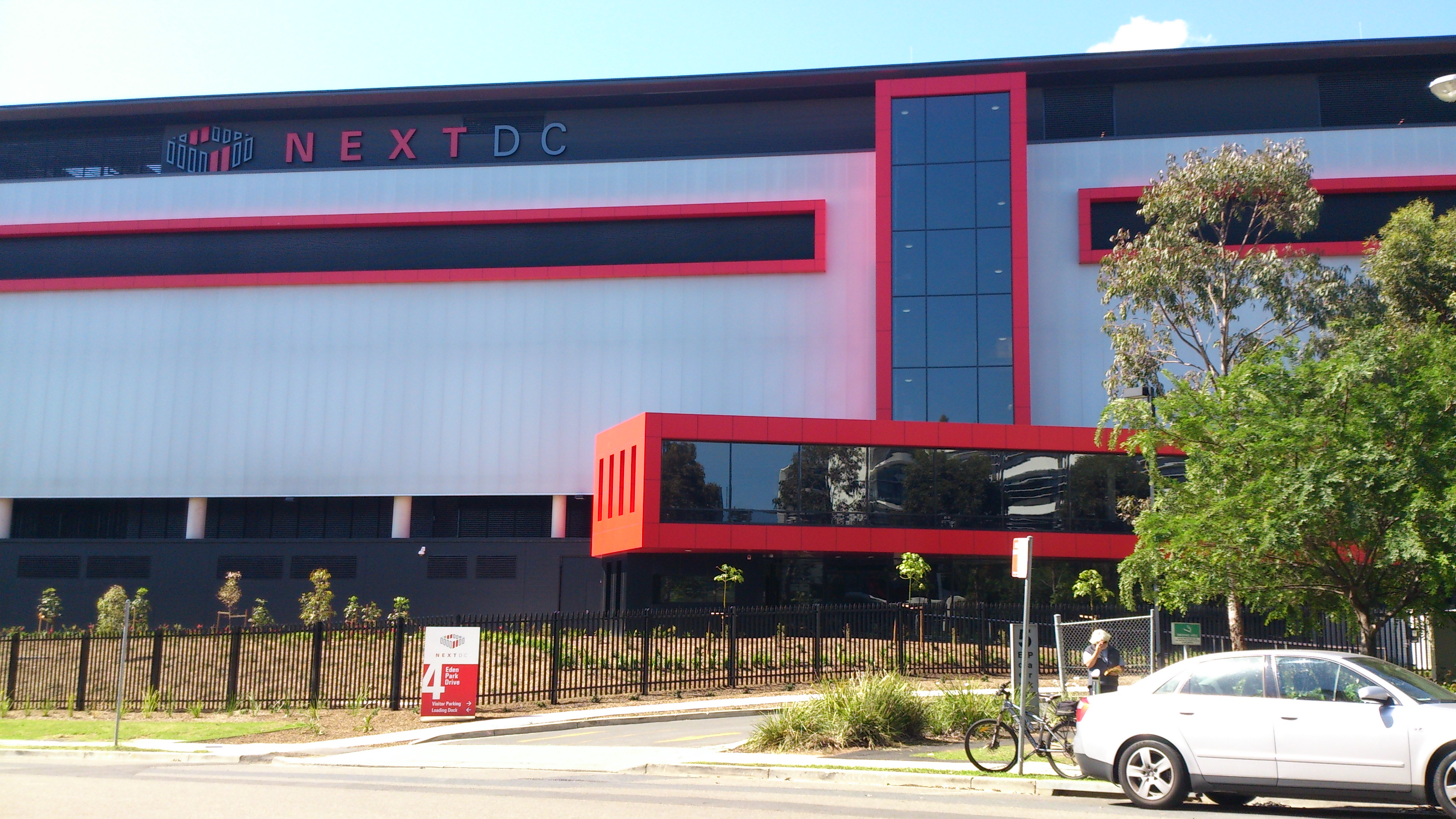
NextDC

The corporate prestige, close access to facilities and aesthetically pleasing environment are an attraction for many corporations. Macquarie Park had a total number of 32,308 jobs in 2001, making it the fourth largest concentration of jobs in NSW after Sydney CBD, North Sydney and Parramatta. Large businesses in the suburb include: AstraZeneca, Avaya, Bilfinger, BOC, Canon, CA, Compuware, CSC, Fujitsu, Fuji Xerox, Ford Australia, George Weston Foods, Hitachi, Hyundai, Johnson & Johnson, Kenwood, Kimberly-Clark, Kyocera, Lucent Technologies, Memjet, Metcash, NielsenIQ, Nestlé Purina PetCare, Nortel, Novartis, Optus (moved in late 2007 from North Sydney), Oracle Corporation, Orix, Philips, Raytheon, Sanofi, Siemens, Smiths Medical, Sony, Toshiba, TPG Telecom, Warner Music Group and Wesfarmers Industrial & Safety.

=== Commerce ===
Macquarie Centre is a major shopping centre located opposite Macquarie University and next to Macquarie University station. There are also two smaller shopping centres nearby, Lachlan's Square Village located in the Lachlan's Line precinct and strip mall on Lane Cove Road known as Eden Park Centre which features fast food restaurants and other takeaway shops.

Macquarie Park has a wide variety of restaurants and cafes and is known as a major dining destination in the Northern Suburbs of Sydney. There are a large number of restaurants ranging from Australian to Chinese (including Cantonese), Japanese and Korean restaurants and eateries.

As at October 2024, a bus depot for Busways is under construction.

== Macquarie University Station Precinct ==
A substantial re-development of the Macquarie University station precinct (also known as the Herring Road Precinct) in Macquarie Park is planned and underway as part of the Government of New South Wales's "Priority Growth Precincts" program (originally known as the "Urban Activation Precincts" program). The objective is to provide housing and employment close to transport to help meet Sydney's growth needs, including up to 2,400 new homes by 2021 and up to 5,800 by 2031 that are within a ten-minute walk from Macquarie University station. Following public display and consultation, the rezoning proposal was finalised in September 2015.

== Transport ==
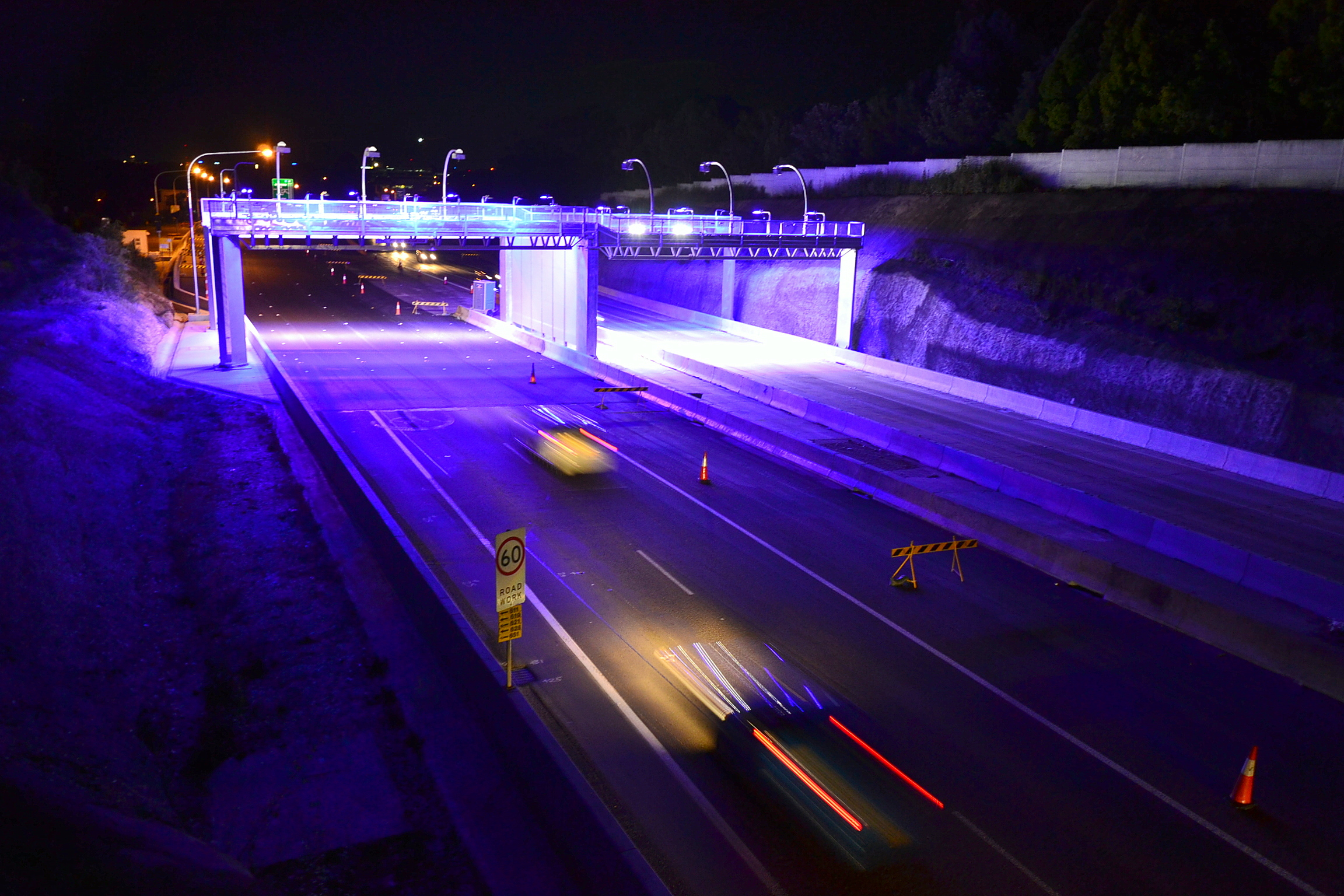
The M2 Hills Motorway from Culloden Road

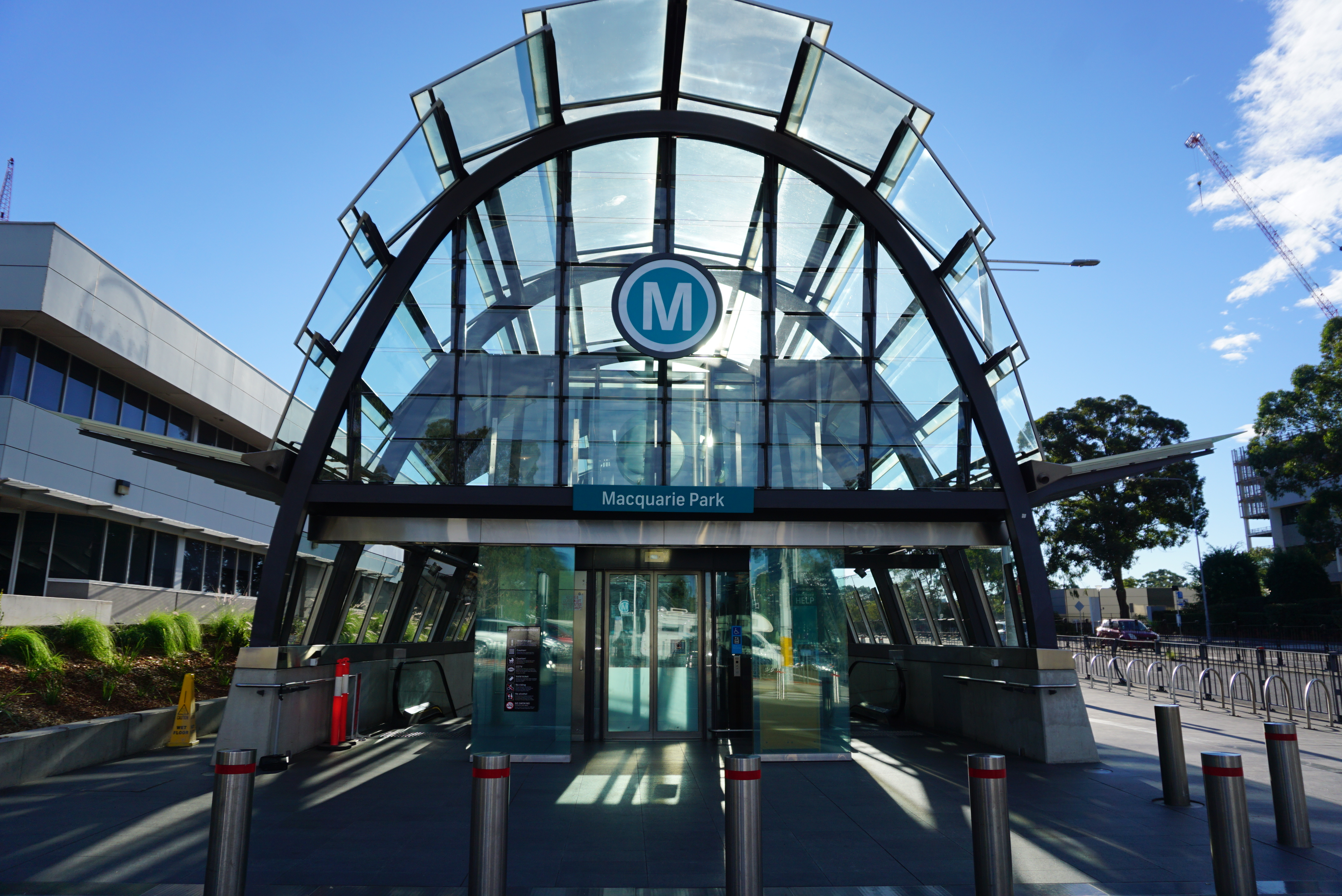
Macquarie Park railway station

Macquarie Park has access to the M2 Hills Motorway, that runs through the northern part of the suburb. It is serviced by Busways, CDC NSW and Transit Systems bus services.

During peak hour, the whole area gets very congested with traffic. It is currently subject to a number of projects to combat this

Macquarie Park, Macquarie University and North Ryde stations are underground stations on the Metro North West & Bankstown Line which opened on 26 May 2019. Until 30 September 2018 they were on the Epping to Chatswood rail line operated by Sydney Trains. The line opened on 23 February 2009 and closed for metro conversion on 30 September 2018.

At the 2016 census, 36.4% of employed people travelled to work on public transport and 34.1% by car either as driver or as passenger, compared to the 2021 Census, conducted during COVID which recorded that 10.3% of residents travelled to work by public transport and 20.7% by car either as a driver or passenger.

== Education ==
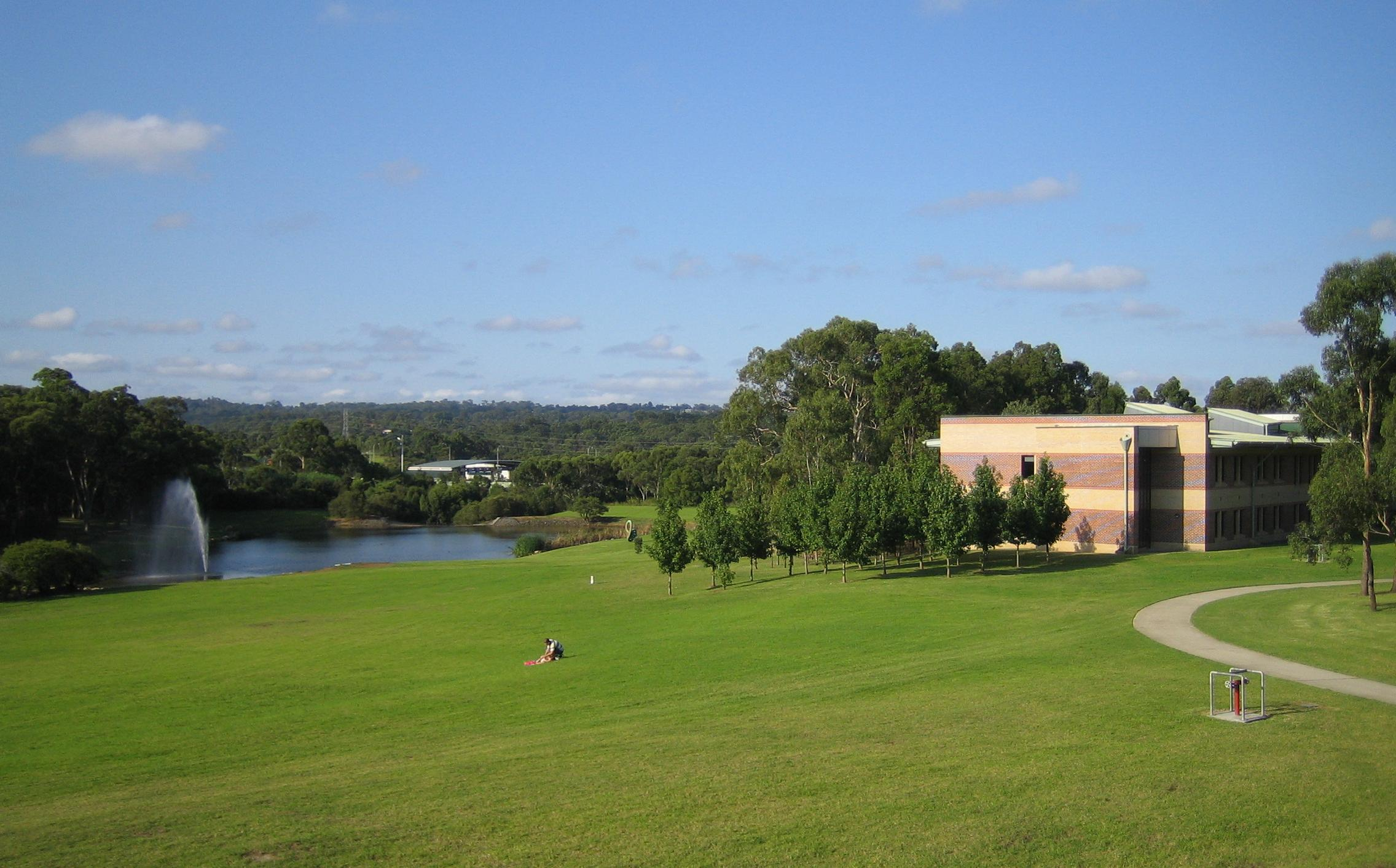
Macquarie University

Macquarie University is one of Australia's largest universities. It features a 126-hectare park-like campus beside a high-technology corridor.

The university is affiliated with a number of colleges also located in the suburb including Dunmore Lang College, Robert Menzies College an Anglican college, Macquarie Christian Studies Institute and Sydney Institute of Business & Technology.

Macquarie University has in recent years become a major research centre, with Macquarie University Hospital and the Cochlear Research Centre located within the university grounds.

Excelsia College moved to a Macquarie Park campus in 2016.

== Demographics ==
At the 2021 census, Macquarie Park recorded a population of 11,071. Of these:

Age distribution
In keeping with its proximity to the university, Macquarie Park shows an over-representation of younger adults compared to the rest of the country. Macquarie Park residents' median age was 31 years, compared to the national median of 38. Children aged 0–14 years made up 11.1% of the population (compared to the national average of 18.2%) and people aged 65 years and over made up 8.7% of the population (the national average was 17.2%).
Ethnic diversity
29.6% of people were born in Australia. The other most common countries of birth were China 16.7%, India 10.2%, South Korea 4.0%, Hong Kong 3.5% and the Philippines 3.3%. However, only 10.8% identify their ethnic ancestry as Australian; the other most common self-identified ancestries were Chinese 30.1%, English 12.3%, Indian 10.2% and Korean 5.0%. 33.3% of people only spoke English at home. Other languages spoken at home included Mandarin 18.4%, Cantonese 6.6%, Hindi 4.5%, Korean 4.4% and Persian (excluding Dari) 2.4%.
Religion
This is an optional question on the Census. Of the people who answered it, the most common responses were No Religion, so described 42.8%, Catholic 12.1%, Hinduism 9.9%, Not stated 7.2%, and Islam 5.5%.

== Politics ==
Macquarie Park is in the state of New South Wales electorates of Lane Cove and Ryde, and the federal electorate of Bennelong.

== Climate ==
Like the rest of the Sydney basin, Macquarie Park has a humid sub-tropical climate with warm to hot summers and cool, damp winters. The record low of −3.5 °C (26 °F) was recorded on 28 July 1986. The record maximum temperature was recorded more recently, on 21 December 1994 when the temperature reached 43.1 °C (110 °F).

Climate data for Macquarie Park
Month	Jan	Feb	Mar	Apr	May	Jun	Jul	Aug	Sep	Oct	Nov	Dec	Year
Record high °C (°F)	41.5 (106.7)	41.4 (106.5)	40.7 (105.3)	33.5 (92.3)	28.5 (83.3)	24.8 (76.6)	26.0 (78.8)	30.1 (86.2)	34.4 (93.9)	39.1 (102.4)	42.0 (107.6)	43.1 (109.6)	43.1 (109.6)
Mean daily maximum °C (°F)	27.7 (81.9)	27.4 (81.3)	25.9 (78.6)	23.4 (74.1)	20.3 (68.5)	17.4 (63.3)	17.1 (62.8)	18.5 (65.3)	21.1 (70.0)	23.3 (73.9)	24.8 (76.6)	27.1 (80.8)	22.8 (73.0)
Mean daily minimum °C (°F)	16.9 (62.4)	16.9 (62.4)	15.2 (59.4)	12.0 (53.6)	9.2 (48.6)	6.5 (43.7)	4.9 (40.8)	5.7 (42.3)	7.8 (46.0)	10.8 (51.4)	13.0 (55.4)	15.6 (60.1)	11.2 (52.2)
Record low °C (°F)	8.5 (47.3)	8.9 (48.0)	6.1 (43.0)	2.5 (36.5)	0.3 (32.5)	−1.7 (28.9)	−3.5 (25.7)	−1.1 (30.0)	0.1 (32.2)	0.9 (33.6)	1.2 (34.2)	6.5 (43.7)	−3.5 (25.7)
Average precipitation mm (inches)	120.1 (4.73)	144.8 (5.70)	131.1 (5.16)	110.8 (4.36)	86.0 (3.39)	114.0 (4.49)	56.3 (2.22)	53.9 (2.12)	60.1 (2.37)	84.5 (3.33)	93.7 (3.69)	86.0 (3.39)	1,141.8 (44.95)
Average precipitation days (≥ 0.1 mm)	12.5	13.0	13.2	10.4	10.3	10.9	8.6	7.7	8.1	10.7	13.0	11.3	129.7

== In popular culture ==
Macquarie Park is also the location for the Lane Cove River Tourist Park where the Australian soap opera Home & Away is partly filmed.
