= East Ryde =

- Suburb
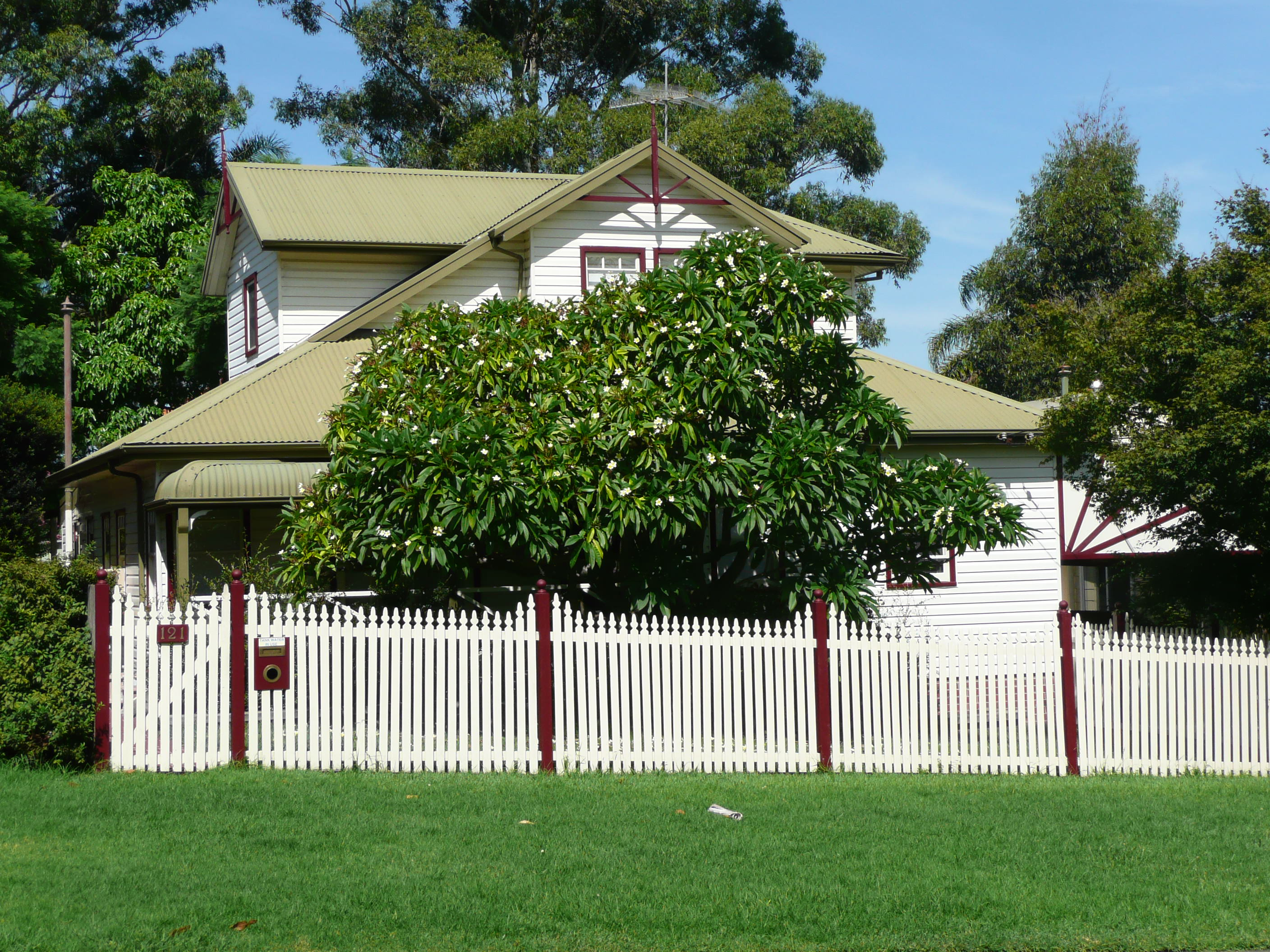
- A suburban house in East Ryde

- Interactive map of East Ryde
- Country: Australia
- State: New South Wales
- City: Sydney
- LGA: City of Ryde
- Location: 12 km (7.5 mi) NW of Sydney CBD

Government
  - State electorate: Lane Cove
  - Federal division: Bennelong

Population
  - Total: 2,522 (2021 census)
- Postcode: 2113
Suburbs around East Ryde
North Ryde	North Ryde	North Ryde
Ryde	East Ryde	Lane Cove West
Ryde	Gladesville	Hunters Hill

East Ryde is a suburb of Sydney in the state of New South Wales, Australia. It is in the Northern Sydney region and is located 12 kilometers north-west of the Sydney central business district, in the local government area of the City of Ryde. East Ryde sits on the western bank of the Lane Cove River. East Ryde shares the postcode of 2113 with the adjacent suburb of North Ryde, though it does not have a post office of its own.

== Location ==
East Ryde is a relatively small, quiet suburb surrounded by bushland and water on all but one side. The majority of East Ryde is located on top of a ridge, formerly a council rubbish tip, a locality known as the Dress Circle Estate, which was developed by Hooker Rex and opened in 1960. The areas of East Ryde that are at the banks of the Lane Cove River overlook the mangrove wetlands and are characterised by large, modern homes (mainly along Pittwater Road).

== Aboriginal culture ==
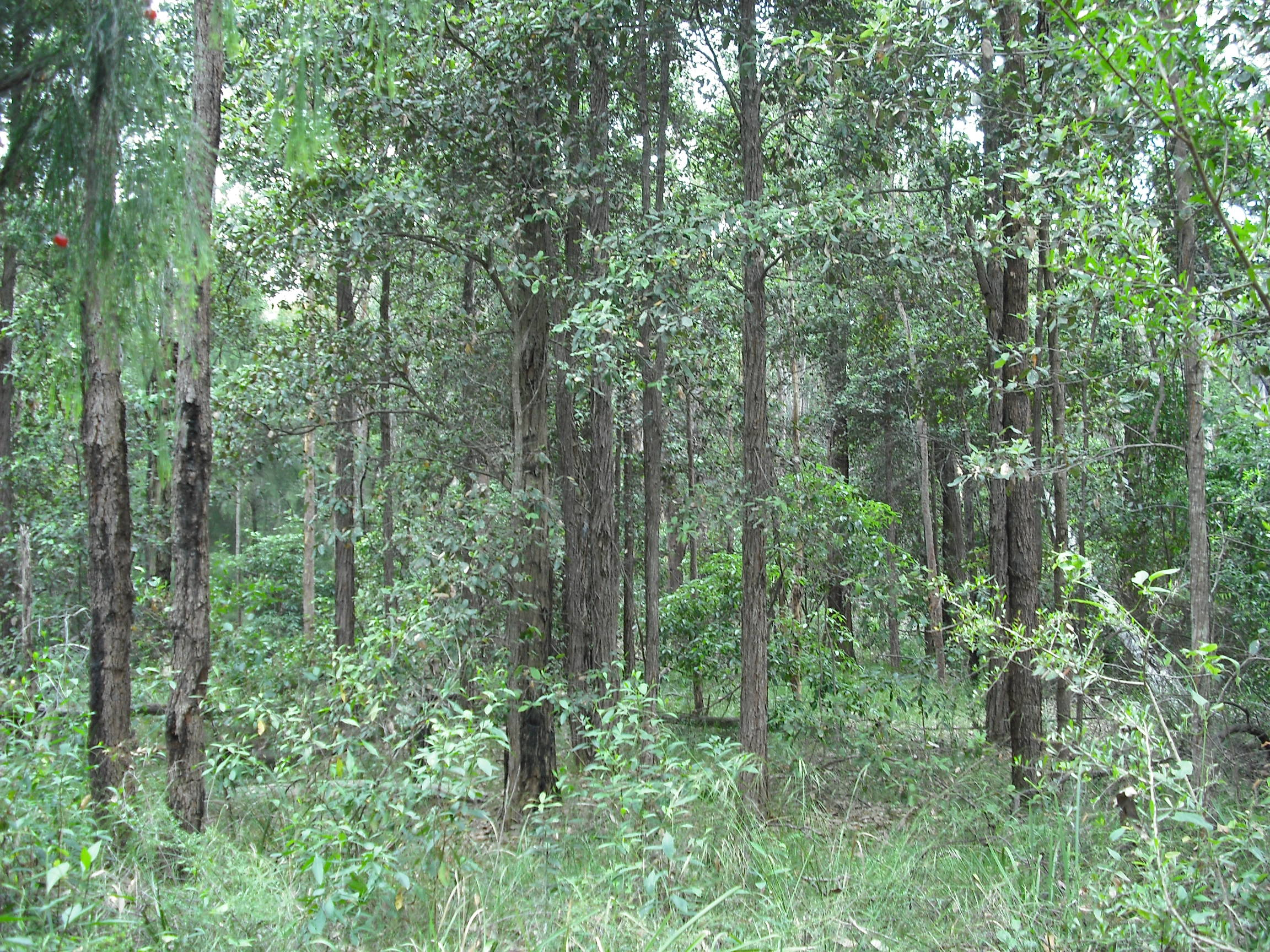
Wallumatta Nature Reserve

The whole area between the Parramatta and Lane Cove Rivers was originally known by its Aboriginal name Wallumatta. Contact with the first white settlement's bridgehead into Australia quickly devastated much of the population through epidemics of smallpox and other diseases. Their descendants live on, though their language, social system, way of life and traditions are mostly lost. The Aboriginal name survives in a local reserve, the Wallumatta Nature Reserve, located at the corner of Twin and Cressy roads. Very few remnants of Sydney Turpentine-Ironbark Forest still exist. The most substantial undisturbed area is the Wallumatta Nature Reserve in North Ryde, which is owned and managed by the National Parks and Wildlife Service. This small and critically endangered reserve, also known as the Macquarie Hospital Bushland, is one of the last remnants of the remaining 0.5% (as at 2007) of original and endangered turpentine-ironbark forests on Wianamatta shale soil in Sydney. See Sydney Turpentine-Ironbark Forest.

== History ==
The entire area was once turpentine-ironbark forest. The area that is now East Ryde was originally known as the 'North Ryde Dress Circle Estate', as it was part of North Ryde before forging its own identity as a suburb.

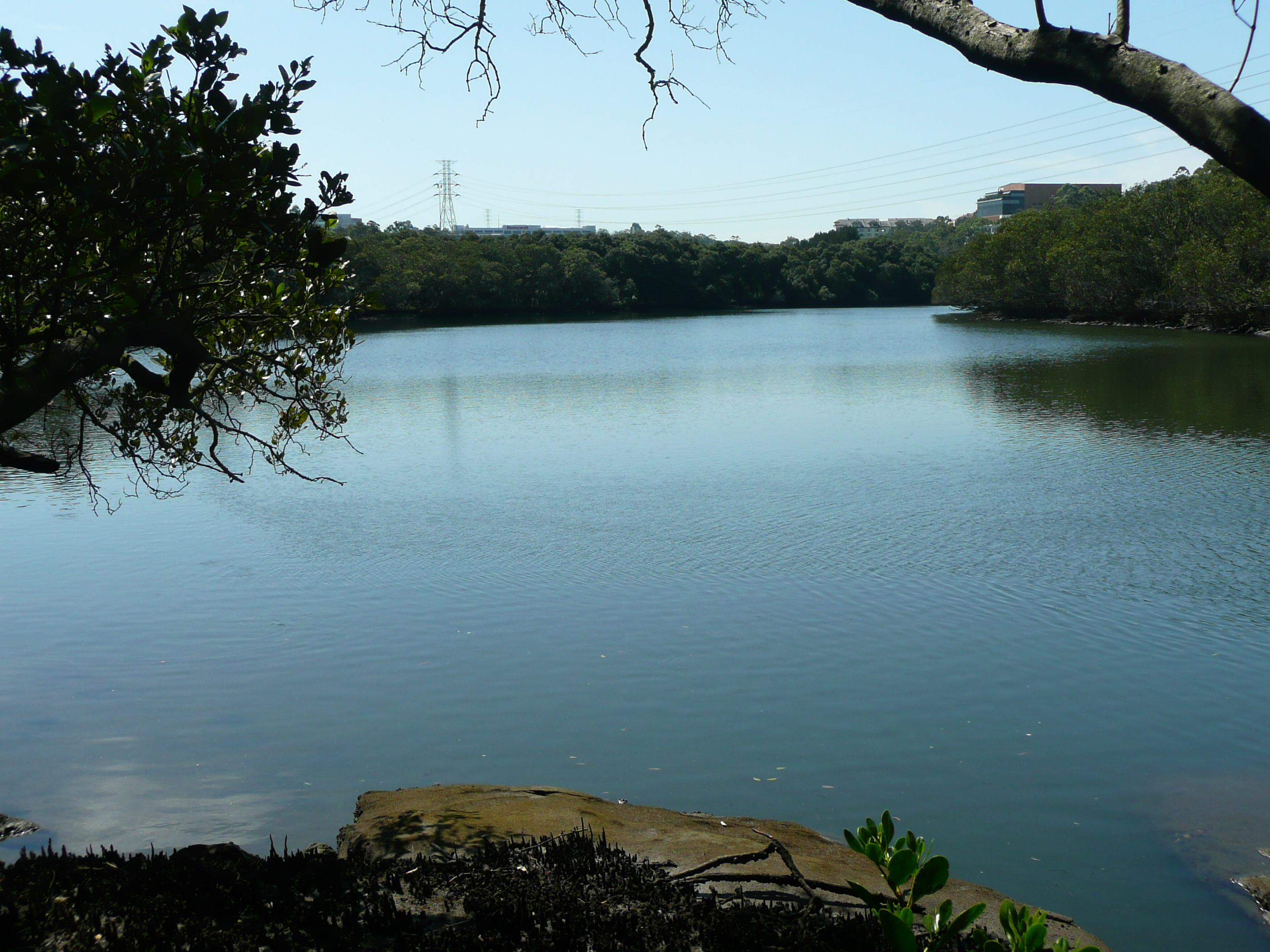
The Lane Cove River where it passes East Ryde

East Ryde is bounded by Cressy Road, Coxs Road, the Lane Cove River, Strangers Creek and Buffalo Creek. It was originally part of the Field of Mars Common. This was an area set aside by Governor King in 1804 for breeding stock owned by the early settlers whose allotments were inadequate to sustain their sheep and cattle. Because of its size and rugged character however, the common became infamous as a haven for escaped convicts and robbers. As early as 1856 there were proposals to sell the Field of Mars Common to raise finance for much needed infrastructure, but it was not until 1874 that the Field of Mars Common Resumption Act was passed in the New South Wales parliament. The first land sale of the new subdivision was held in September 1885 and included lots around Kittys Creek and today's East Ryde, though at this time East Ryde did not have a distinctive suburb name – it was part of North Ryde. An early proposal to link the released land to other parts of Sydney involved a tramway to the Field of Mars. In 1884 it was proposed that the tram would run through Balmain and Gladesville, crossing Strangers Creek where a bridge would be built. The tramway would traverse the common on its eastern side, probably along Pittwater Road, and then proceed north. More than 16 years later, on the same day as the opening of the De Burghs Bridge across the Lane Cove River, the Minister for Works proceeded to Gladesville to turn the first sod of the Field of Mars tramway – a tramway that was never built. In 1925 the finance committee of the New South Wales government approved the construction of a railway line between Eastwood and St Leonards. Housing developments appeared along the proposed route. One of these was on a hill near a proposed station at the eastern corner of today's Macquarie Hospital grounds. Because of its elevated position it was called the Dress Circle Estate. This estate was roughly two-thirds of the modern suburb of East Ryde. The 1926 subdivision plan clearly shows the influence that the promised railway had on this development. In larger typeface than 'The Dress Circle Estate' are the words 'Eastwood–St Leonards New railway' - "60 choice elevated lots overlooking the beautiful Lane Cove River... close to a proposed station on the new electric railway from Eastwood to St Leonards". There were two roads indicated – Twin Road and Mary Avenue. There was confidence that the railway would go ahead because it had been a passed by the State Parliamentary Works Committee. In 1929 the estate was extended with an addition called The Hill Top Estate. However, in the same year the government cancelled the proposed railway. Development of the estate ceased after only one house had been built.

Hooker Rex retained the original name of the Dress Circle Estate and named the streets according to a theatrical theme. Some of the greatest Australian stars of stage and screen are commemorated in the street names of East Ryde. Personalities commemorated include opera singers June Bronhill, Ronald Dowd and Dame Nellie Melba (Melba Avenue was formerly an extension of Twin Road); actors Diane Cilento, Peter Finch, Cecil Kellaway, John McCallum, Michael Pate and Madge Elliott; comedians Kitty Bluett, Roy Rene and Gladys Moncrieff; songwriter, entertainer and radio broadcasting pioneer Jack Lumsdaine; author and playwright Steele Rudd; and Peggy Sager, prima ballerina. Heard Street (original name of Rene Street) was named after Henry Heard, a settler in 1858 and an alderman on the first Ryde Council in 1871. Mary Avenue (now Elliott Avenue) was named after Henry's wife, Mary Jane Heard. Twin Road (formerly Bridge Road, extended into today's Moncrieff Drive and Melba Drive) was named after Henry and Mary's twin daughters Laura and Mabel, who were born in 1873.

On 1 October 1960 the Mayor of Ryde, Alderman ELS Hall, unveiled a drinking fountain and plaque in the reserve outside the shopping centre, commemorating the successful development of 500 home sites and the construction of 250 modern homes on the Dress Circle Estate. Following the increase in the area's population, Ryde East Public School opened in 1961. In 1970 another 20 home sites were created when Finch Avenue was extended into rezoned crown land between Moncrieff Drive and Stranger's Creek. Covenants controlled the type and quality of houses on the estate. The blocks were only one-sixth of an acre (650 square metres) instead of one-quarter of an acre (1,000 square metres). These were big enough for single dwellings, the only type allowed under the covenant, rather than multiple dwellings.

A group of residents, in July 2006 unsuccessfully campaigned to have the suburb name changed to increase the area's housing prices. Suggestions included Bel Air, Melba, Dress Circle, Boronia Heights, Bennelong and Wallumatta. The motion was ultimately defeated at a public meeting, with approximately 75% of East Ryde residents present voting to keep the suburb's present name.

== Landmarks and Features ==
=== Great North Walk ===
During the 1980s, a long-distance walking trail from Sydney to Newcastle was created, known as the Great North Walk. The trail partly follows the Lane Cove River and passes through East Ryde between Buffalo Creek and Magdala Park. Major features in this area are the mangrove communities at Buffalo Creek and Kittys Creek, where boardwalks have been constructed to allow walkers to walk easily through the mangroves. Buffalo Creek Reserve offers picnic facilities.

=== Schools ===
Ryde East Primary School is located on Twin Road, with 350 students. The school features in Ursula Dubosarsky's book "Jerry", based on the death of an old horse that lived in a field opposite the school, and was greatly loved by the children. Dubosarsky had spent some months working in a building in the school grounds for the NSW School Magazine. "Jerry" is dedicated to Ryde East Public School.

=== Parks ===
Heatley Reserve, located in the East Ryde Shopping Centre complex, is named after Ernest William Heatley, the former owner and operator of the adjacent newsagency who was murdered in July 1983 by Gary James Boreland during an attempted robbery.

Brereton Park, bordered by Melba Drive, Bronhill Avenue and Pittwater Road, is named after John Le Gay Brereton.

=== Waterways ===
- Lane Cove River
- Stranger's Creek
- Kitty's Creek
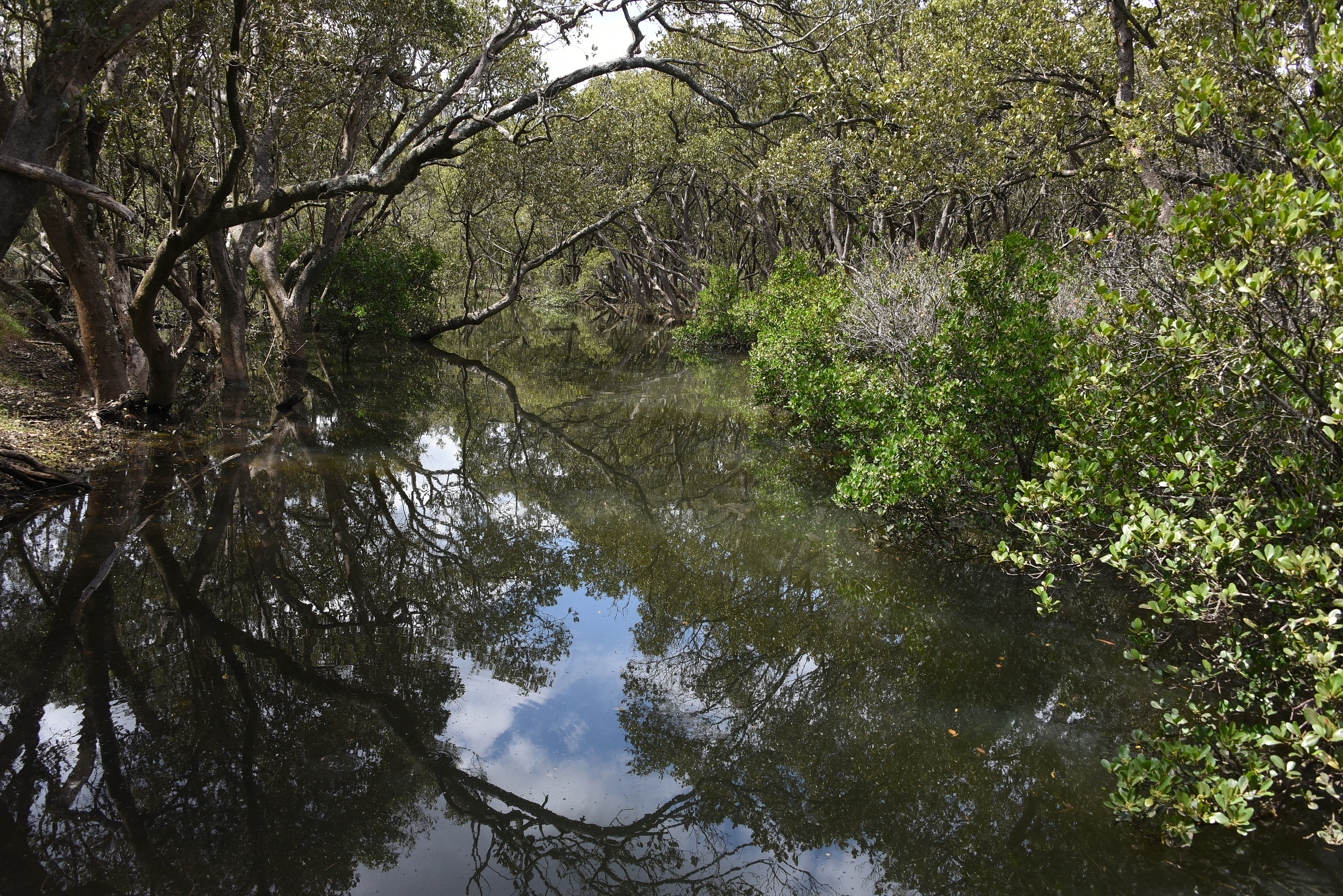
  Kitty's Creek

=== Scout Halls ===
- 1st East Ryde, John Miller Street (Ryde)
- 3rd North Ryde, Cressy Road

== Population ==
According to the 2021 census, there were 2,522 residents in East Ryde. 71.7% of people were born in Australia and 74.3% of people spoke only English at home. The most common ancestries were English 30.7%, Australian 30.4%, Irish 12.5%, Chinese 11.7% and Scottish 8.8%. The most common responses for religion were No Religion 33.3%, Catholic 32.3% and Anglican 11.6%. The median weekly household income was $3,240, considerably higher than the national median of $1,746.

== Notable residents ==
- former professional rugby league footballer Steve Roach
- former professional rugby league footballer Paul Sironen
