= Charles George Johnson =

Australian politician and businessman

Charles George Johnson (1886–14 October 1950) was a chemist, businessman and political figure in Adelaide, South Australia.

== Biography ==
Johnson was born in Essex, England in 1886 and led an adventurous life, including a spell of boxing professionally, before arriving in Adelaide in 1925. He first came to public notice as a Labor Party (ALP) candidate for a North Adelaide seat in South Australia's House of Assembly in 1933.

In August 1934, Johnson founded the cleaning products company Jasol Chemical Products. "Jasol" was an acronym for "Johnson's Antiseptic Soluble Oils Limited." Early deliveries were done by Johnson on a pushbike.

In 1945, when he was well known for his association with the Jasol firm, Johnson was elected as Councillor on the Adelaide City Council. He resigned from the ALP in 1947. He consistently voted against generosity towards retiring councillors, mayors and employees, even when he acknowledged that the person had served the council exceptionally well. He resigned in 1949 to stand as an alderman but was defeated.

He was vice-president of the Adelaide sub-branch of the Returned Sailors Soldiers and Airmens Imperial League of Australia.

Johnson lived on South Terrace, Adelaide. He died in the Repatriation General Hospital, Daw Park in 1950. He was survived by his wife Millie Johnson.
