= George Weston Foods =

Australian consumer products company

- Industry: Food products
- Headquarters: Sydney, Australia
- Products: bread, flour, processed meat
- Owner: Associated British Foods Plc.
- Parent: Associated British Foods Plc.
- Divisions: Baking, Don KRC, Cereform, Jasol
- Website: www.georgewestonfoods.com.au

George Weston Foods is one of the largest consumer products companies in Australia. It is a wholly owned subsidiary of Associated British Foods Plc. Its brands include Tip Top and Top Taste.

In 2003, Weston's biscuits were put up for sale in order to consolidate the company's product lines. The majority of Weston's sweet biscuit brands were acquired by Paradise Foods, whilst three of the brands were acquired by Arnott's Biscuits Holdings.

Along with Goodman Fielder, it is one of the two main commercial bread manufacturers in Australia.

In 2019, it was announced that the Top Taste Cakes division of the company would close its doors in March 2020.

== Products ==
- Baking division – The most well known of GWF business divisions, the Baking division is located in Australia and New Zealand and is responsible for some of the most well known brands of bakery products. Brands include Tip Top, Burgen, Ploughmans Bakery and "Two Hands", Golden, Noble Rise and Bazaar. GWF has multiple bakeries over the country, and they are responsible for much of the bread consumed in New Zealand.
- Cereform division – Cake and baking pre-mixes to commercial and industrial sectors.
- The DON-KRC division produces and distributes fresh and packaged smallgoods products, including strasburg, salami, kabana, frankfurts, ham, bacon, fresh sausages, cheese and other specialty products. The DON KRC division of GWF is based in Castlemaine and generates approximately A$800 million in annual sales.
- Jasol – cleaning and industrial chemicals. The brand, previously owned by F H Faulding, was purchased in 1986.
- Weston Cereal Industries (WCI) – flour
