= Samuel Barbour =

Australian chemist and X-ray pioneer (1860–1938)

Samuel Barbour (1860 – 3 June 1938) was an Australian chemist, photographer and X-ray pioneer in the colony of South Australia. In Australia, the medical men of the day took a slow approach in the adoption of the new science that involved X-rays. Many of the early demonstrations were made by investigators outside the medical field. Upon examination of the initial investigators, several key factors were common. The individuals had already either been experimenting along similar lines to Wilhelm Röntgen with Crookes tubes and such, the physicists or scientists, or were actively associated with electrical work, the electricians, which made them particularly receptive to the technical appeal of the new science of X-rays. Records of the events reveal that among the medical men who witnessed the first images produced as radiographs, a rather small number had any great desire to employ X-rays directly in their own medical practice.

After the early investigative work of Thomas Ranken Lyle, William Henry Bragg, Joseph Patrick Slattery, and others, almost all medical men were satisfied with soliciting the services of the external X-ray man when necessity arose for skiagraphs to be produced. As the utilization of X-rays became more acceptable, the involvement of electricians began to decline. As the hospitals started to be equipped with X-ray apparatus and installations under the care of radiologists and radiographers, the medical men began to accept the eventuality of the new technology. Up to this point, the private experimenters and investigators continued to be the initiators of new ideas for the medical profession in this new field.

== Life and times ==
In 1860, Samuel Barbour was born at Leeds, Yorkshire, England the son of William Donald and Mary Hannah Barbour née Clark. His father was born in Scotland, was employed as a manufacturing chemist’s clerk. His mother was born at Bramley, Yorkshire, England. In 1871, his father was employed as an agent and accountant. The family had 5 sons, William J., Arthur J., Samuel, Frederick W. and Charles Ernest, and 4 daughters, Charlotte A., Eleanor, Mary and Margaret. The household also employed a nurse Mary Whitaker, age 42, born at Leeds and a servant Mary A. W. Hewitt, age 16, born at Leeds. Barbour emigrated to South Australia and worked as a chemist. He was a pioneer in the development of X-rays in the colony of South Australia. Later he moved to Western Australia and worked as a chemist. He died in 1938 at Leederville, Western Australia. Barbour was buried at Congregational Cemetery in Karrakatta, Western Australia.

== South Australia ==
By February 1888, Barbour was residing at King William-street in Adelaide, South Australia as reported in the local Police Gazette. He had items stolen from his bicycle at his residence, "two bicycle keys, a wrench, and an oilcan." Barbour secured a position as chemist at the pharmaceutical manufacturing firm, F. H. Faulding & Co. He rose to the rank of senior chemist. Eucalyptus oil was a key component in the product line at Faulding and in 1892 Barbour developed a test method to determine the eucalyptol concentration of eucalyptus oil. The Barbour test method became a standard in the industry and in 1893 was listed in the British Pharmacopoeia. On 8 January 1895, Barbour presented a paper at a meeting of the Pharmaceutical Society of Australia where he proposed standards for eucalyptol concentrations in eucalyptus oil and mentioned the Faulding process. He proposed limits on the specific gravity of eucalyptol and eucalyptus oil. While at Faulding & Co., Barbour went on holiday to America and England. He visited Leeds, his hometown, where he purchased two Crookes tubes from Reynolds and Branson. In April 1896, Barbour returned to Adelaide.

== X-ray pioneer ==
The physicist William Henry Bragg had a keen interest in the new discovery of Wilhelm Röntgen. On 29 May 1896 at Adelaide, Bragg demonstrated before a meeting of local doctors the application of "X-rays to reveal structures that were otherwise invisible". Samuel Barbour, senior chemist from the firm of F. H. Faulding & Co., an Adelaide pharmaceutical manufacturer, supplied the necessary apparatus in the form of a Crookes tube, a glass discharge tube. The tube was obtained at Leeds, England, during Barbour’s holiday in America and Europe. While at Leeds, he visited the firm of Reynolds and Branson, a manufacturer of photographic and laboratory equipment. Barbour returned to Adelaide in April 1896. The tube was attached to an induction coil and a battery borrowed from Sir Charles Todd, Bragg’s father-in-law. The induction coil was utilized to produce the electric spark necessary for Bragg and Barbour to "generate short bursts of X-rays". The audience was favorably impressed. Bragg availed himself as a test subject, in the manner of Röntgen and allowed an X-ray photograph to be taken of his hand. The image of the fingers in his hand revealed "an old injury to one of his fingers sustained when using the turnip chopping machine on his father’s farm in Cumbria". On 27 January 1897, Barbour placed the following advertisement in the Evening Journal with the heading Skiagraphy or Photographs by Rontgen Rays. On 4 January 1897, a similar advertisement had been placed on page 1 in The Express and Telegraph at Adelaide.

SKIOGRAPHY or PHOTOGRAPHY BY RONTGEN RAYS

“SKIOGRAPHS taken of various parts of the human body, showing the location of needles, shot, &c., and the details of fractured bones. Visual examination of the same if desired. Special terms for the application of the Rays at patients' residences. Scale of fees on application. Attendance daily, 11 to 12 a.m., and at other hours by appointment. S. BARBOUR, 6, Landrowna-terrace, Victoria-square, Adelaide.”

At some point Barbour left the employ of Faulding and conducted a business as radiographer in Gawler Chambers, North terrace. In 1898, he sold his X-ray apparatus for £120 to Sir Joseph Verco and moved to Western Australia. His younger brother, Charles Ernest was ill and Barbour planned to help run the brother’s business.

== Western Australia ==
In 1899, Barbour moved to the Perth area of Western Australia. He settled in Leederville. He took over his brother’s business as a cycle and sewing machine agent. In 1902, The West Australian mentioned Barbour as a cycle agent in the election notices for the Municipality of Leederville. Barbour took up the business of X-ray work for a while. Later he worked as a manufacturing chemist with the firm of Felton, Grimwade and Bickford and Co.
