= Lachlan's Square Village =

- Location: Macquarie Park, New South Wales, Australia
- Coordinates: 33°47′34″S 151°08′01″E
- Address: 17 Halifax St, Macquarie Park NSW 2113
- Opened: 29 September 2020; 6 years ago
- Manager: Greenland Australia
- Owner: Greenland Australia
- Num. of stores: 15
- Num. of anchor tenants: 1
- Floor area: 5,000 m^{2} (53,820 sq ft)
- Floors: 2
- Parking: 220 spaces
- Public transit: North Ryde Station
- Website: lachlanssquarevillage.com.au

Lachlan's Square Village is a shopping centre in the suburb of Macquarie Park in Northern Sydney.

== Transport ==
The Metro North West & Bankstown Line offers frequent services to North Ryde station which is a short walk from the centre with trains running from Tallawong to Chatswood.

Lachlan's Square Village has Busways operated bus connections to the Sydney CBD, North Shore, Northern Sydney and Greater Western Sydney, as well as local surrounding suburbs. The majority of its bus services are located in Jarvis Circuit and Epping Road.

Lachlan's Square Village also has a multi level car park with 220 spaces.

== History ==
Construction of Lachlan's Square Village commenced in December 2017 and was expected to be completed by the fourth quarter of 2019.

However, on 1 April 2019, a large amount of scaffolding and concrete collapsed and killed an 18 year old formwork apprentice Christopher Cassaniti and critically injured another worker aged 39 who was trapped under the collapsed scaffolding. Emergency services were called to the scene around 12:30pm. Eight ambulances, police and fire and rescue crews and the Care Flight helicopter were at the scene. The rescuers struggled to free the teenager who was amongst the twisted pile of piping. The work was slow and delicate due to the risk of a further collapse. Miraculously, with up to 350 workers on the site on any given day, the number of deaths and injuries was not significantly higher. Several investigations were launched into the cause of the collapse.

Lachlans Square Village was due to open in November 2019 however it was delayed to June 2020.

On 29 September 2020, Coles and its Liquorland store opened. The 2,736m² Coles supermarket featured an in-store bakery, large gourmet deli and market-style fresh produce area.

On 15 December 2020, a range of retail stores including restaurants opened up in the centre just in time for Christmas. The Snap Fitness gym opened on 22 February 2021.
