= Jasol Chemical Products =

Australian chemical company

Jasol Australia (Formerly Jasol Chemical Products) is a chemicals manufacturing company founded in Adelaide, South Australia by Charles George Johnson in 1934.

The brand is now a subsidiary of George Weston Foods, and is Western Australia based, with facilities in New Zealand, Thailand, and China

The name "Jasol" was an acronym of "Johnson's Antiseptic Soluble Oils Limited". Johnson had originally wanted to call the proposed company "Johnson’s Antiseptic Soluble Oils Ltd", but was content with the abbreviation JASOL.

== History ==
=== 1934–1986 ===
- 1934, C. G. Johnson founded Jasol Chemical Products Ltd. on the 13th of August 1934, with 2,000 shares of £1 each divided among five shareholders, (Millie Johnson, E. G. Lawton, F. G. Lawton and F. E. G. Edwards.) The registered office was in Flinders Street, Adelaide. Their Head office was at 57 Gawler Place, with a warehouse at 19 California St. Other premises occupied at various times were ANA Building in 1937 and Epworth Building in 1949.
- At the outset, much of the delivery was done by Johnson on a pushbike. Most sales were through the wholesalers Bickfords and Fauldings.
- 1936, a warehouse facility was set up in Flinders Street, then moved to 33 Pirie Street in 1942, which remained its head office until at least 1962.
- 1960, a greatly enlarged facility was set up in Willcox Ave, Prospect.At this time, Jasol was the most active manufacturer of chemicals in South Australia. During this time an aerosol plant was installed.
- 1971, the company was acquired by Faulding Pharmaceuticals.
- 1984, Jasol acquired Entex Chemicals
- 1986, Jasol was acquired by George Weston Foods.
- 1991, Manufacturing was transferred to Western Australia
- 1995 Jasol acquired Big H Chemicals.
- 1996, Jasol acquired Titan Products.
- 2000, Jasol acquires Lustral Chemicals
- 2002, Jasol acquired EST (producer of dairy industry cleaning chemicals)
- 2003, Jasol New Zealand launched, with the acquisition of Wilson's Chemical.
- 2005, Jasol New Zealand acquired Andrew Ltd.
- 2006, Jasol Asia-Pacific launched, with two branches in Thailand and China.
- 2010, Jasol acquired Elite.

== Products ==
=== Historically ===
- Jasol B antiseptic 1934
- Jasol A "Safer than lysol" (recommended uses included haemorrhoids, sunburn, feminine hygiene)
- Johnson's stomach powder
- Ex-Termin-All (DDT powder)
- Jasol DDT spray (with pyrethrum)

The following products are mentioned in the GWF website as being produced around 1936:

- Pine Oda
- Johnson's Catarrh Balm
- Jasol C & C (for Caretakers and Cleaners)
- Holdfast denture cement

=== Present Day ===
Jasol Australia supplies a wide range of industries with chemicals, as well as domestic cleaning products.
