= Wallumettagal =

Australian Aboriginal people of the Eora nation

The Wallumettagal or Wallumedegal (derived from wallumai, meaning snapper (fish)) tribe was an indigenous Aboriginal tribe that inhabited the area of Sydney today known as the Ryde–Hunters Hill area of the Northern Suburbs. Common Aboriginal names in this part of Lower Northern Sydney include Willandra. Specifically the region is described as "North shore of the Parramatta River, including the City of Ryde, from the intersection of the Lane Cove River and west to Parramatta." The Wallumedegal are listed as part of the Eora.

In the earlier days of Sydney's history, even before the Ryde-Hunters Hill area was known as Kissing Point, it was known as Wallumatta, in honour of its original inhabitants. Wallumatta Nature Reserve is a small remnant of the original vegetation of the area inhabited by the Wallumettagal people.

== Sources ==
- State Library of New South Wales (June 2006). Eora: Mapping Aboriginal Sydney 1770-1850 (PDF). State Library of New South Wales. ISBN 0731371615.
