= Tip Top Bakeries =

Australasian manufacturer of bread

Tip Top
- Type: Sole proprietorship
- Area served: Australia; New Zealand
- Key people: Andrew Cummings (MD)
- Products: Bread & Cakes
- Revenue: ▲ A$ 1 billion + (2007)
- Number of employees: 10,000+ (2007)
- Parent: Associated British Foods
- Website: tiptop.com.au

Tip Top Bakeries is an Australian manufacturer of bread products owned by George Weston Foods, a subsidiary of multinational food giant Associated British Foods.

== History ==
Tip Top® Bakeries was formed in 1949 when George Weston (Australia) Pty Ltd acquired two Australian bakeries. These were the Sydney-based, publicly listed Gartrell White Limited, the largest baker in Australia and Golden Crust Bakery of Adelaide, the largest bakers in South Australia.

Over the years, Tip Top Bakeries have acquired, built and rebuilt bakeries in Queensland, Australian Capital Territory, New South Wales, Victoria, South Australia and Western Australia.

The initial logo for Tip Top was in the shape of a shield with a red and blue background, and white writing, but morphed over the years to reflect the times, and has now become the shape of Australia, with a circle around it, in the same colour scheme.

== Currently ==
Today, Tip Top Bakeries is owned by Associated British Foods and currently employs 3,500 people over 13 bakeries in Australia and New Zealand. On average, they manufacture 1,000,000 baked products every day, and many of their breads are endorsed by the National Heart Foundation of Australia.

The company is best known for its television commercial and packaging slogan of "Good on ya, Mum. Tip Top's the One", which was used for 13 years before being replaced with the new slogan, "Australia's Favourite Bread", in December 2010. But the Original Slogan returned in a 2011 campaign.

=== Products ===
- Sunblest (White Sandwich, White Thick, Wholemeal Sandwich, Wholemeal Thick, Multigrain Sandwich, Multigrain Thick, Mini Loaf: White, Mini Loaf: Wholemeal)
- UP (Omega 3 Sandwich, Omega 3 Wholemeal)
- The One (Lower GI White Sandwich, Lower GI White Toast)
- 9 Grain (Original, Pumpkin Seed, Wholemeal, Mini Loaf : Original)
- Bürgen (Soy-Lin, Wholegrain & Oats, Rye, Fruit & Muesli, Wholemeal & Seeds, Pumpkin Seeds)
- Fruit & Cafe Bread (Raisin, Cafe Raisin, Spicy Fruit, Cafe Buttermilk)
- English Muffins (White, Wholemeal, Multigrain, Spicy Fruit)
- Rolls (Hamburger, Damper, Hot Dog)
- Golden (Crumpet Rounds, Wholemeal Crumpet Rounds, Crumpet Breaks, Pancakes, Pikelets, Pikelet Bites)
- Bagel House (Plain, Blueberry, Cinnamon & Raisin, Poppy Seed, Sesame Seed)
- Bazaar (Turkish Rolls, Turkish Pide, White Lebanese Bread, Wholemeal Lebanese Bread, Greek Yiros, Pizza Bases, Mini Pizza Bases, Wholemeal Pizza Bases, White Pita Pockets, Wholemeal Pita Pockets)
- Krummies (Bread Crumbs, Multigrain Bread Crumbs)
- Kitchen Collection (Soy & Linseed Bread Mix, White Bread Mix, Wholemeal Bread Mix, Flour, Croutons, Stuffing Mix)

== Other Tip Top Food Brands ==
- AGB Australian Garlic Bread International
- Speedibake
- Top Taste Cakes
- Mills & Ware's Cakes
- Ministry of Muffins Little Bites®

== See also ==
- List of bakeries
- List of brand name breads
- List of restaurant chains in Australia
