= Ed Tweddell =

Australian businessman

Ed Tweddell (c. 1941 – 4 August 2005) was an Australian businessperson. He was best known for his role as CEO of Australia's largest indigenous pharmaceutical manufacturer F H Faulding and as Chairman of Ansell. He also served on the board of a number of significant private and public sector organisations including the National Australia Bank, Australia Post and the Commonwealth Scientific and Industrial Research Organisation (CSIRO).

== Early life and career ==
Tweddell was born in Brisbane and graduated in science and medicine from the University of Queensland. Dr Tweddell started his career as a medical practitioner before obtaining a job with Pfizer Inc. in 1976. At Pfizer, Tweddell worked on drug development and medical relations. In 1986, Tweddell was appointed CEO and President of a Japanese healthcare company and stayed with that company for a couple of years.

== F H Faulding ==
Tweddell returned to Australia in 1988 as Managing Director of F. H. Faulding & Co, a pharmaceutical company based in Adelaide. It was Australia's leading native pharmaceutical company. As CEO, Faulding entered into a joint venture with the CSIRO to develop new drugs. He also advocated Federal Government funding for pharmaceutical research given that the Pharmaceutical Benefits Scheme. Under the Keating Government, pharmaceutical companies were offered incentives under the Factor f scheme to develop Australia's pharmaceutical industry. Following a Productivity Commission inquiry, the Factor f scheme was replaced by the Pharmaceutical Industry Investment Program. In 1999, Tweddell signed an agreement with the Federal Government where Faulding would receive $40 million in funding over five years in return for industry development.

Under Dr Tweddell, Faulding established Faulding Pharmaceuticals based in the northern hemisphere. By 2000, the company was receiving more than half of its revenue from overseas. The continued growth of Faulding led to Mayne Nickless buying the company leading to Tweddell's resignation as CEO and from the board in 2001. At that point, it was one of the biggest companies in South Australia.

== Board Positions ==
Dr Tweddell's success at Faulding led to offers to sign on the boards of other companies. In 2001, he became the chairman of Ansell, where he led the restructure of the former Pacific Dunlop company by keeping the Ansell business and divesting unprofitable businesses.

In 1998, Tweddell was appointed as a director of the National Australia Bank, where he sat on a committee assessing business risk. He resigned in 2004 after the foreign exchange scandal led to the bank losing hundreds of millions of dollars. He was also the chair of biotechnology company Peptech, but resigned after three months following an argument with its management.

Tweddell was on the board of Australia Post since 2001 and the CSIRO since 2002. He was a dedicated supporter of the arts, serving as the Chairman of the Adelaide Festival of Arts. He founded the Nepenthe Group winery in 1994 and was a former President of the Adelaide Hills Wine Region.

Tweddell died on 4 August 2005. According to some sources he was believed to have killed himself following an illness.
