= Wallumatta Nature Reserve =

Protected area in New South Wales, Australia

- IUCN category Ia (strict nature reserve)
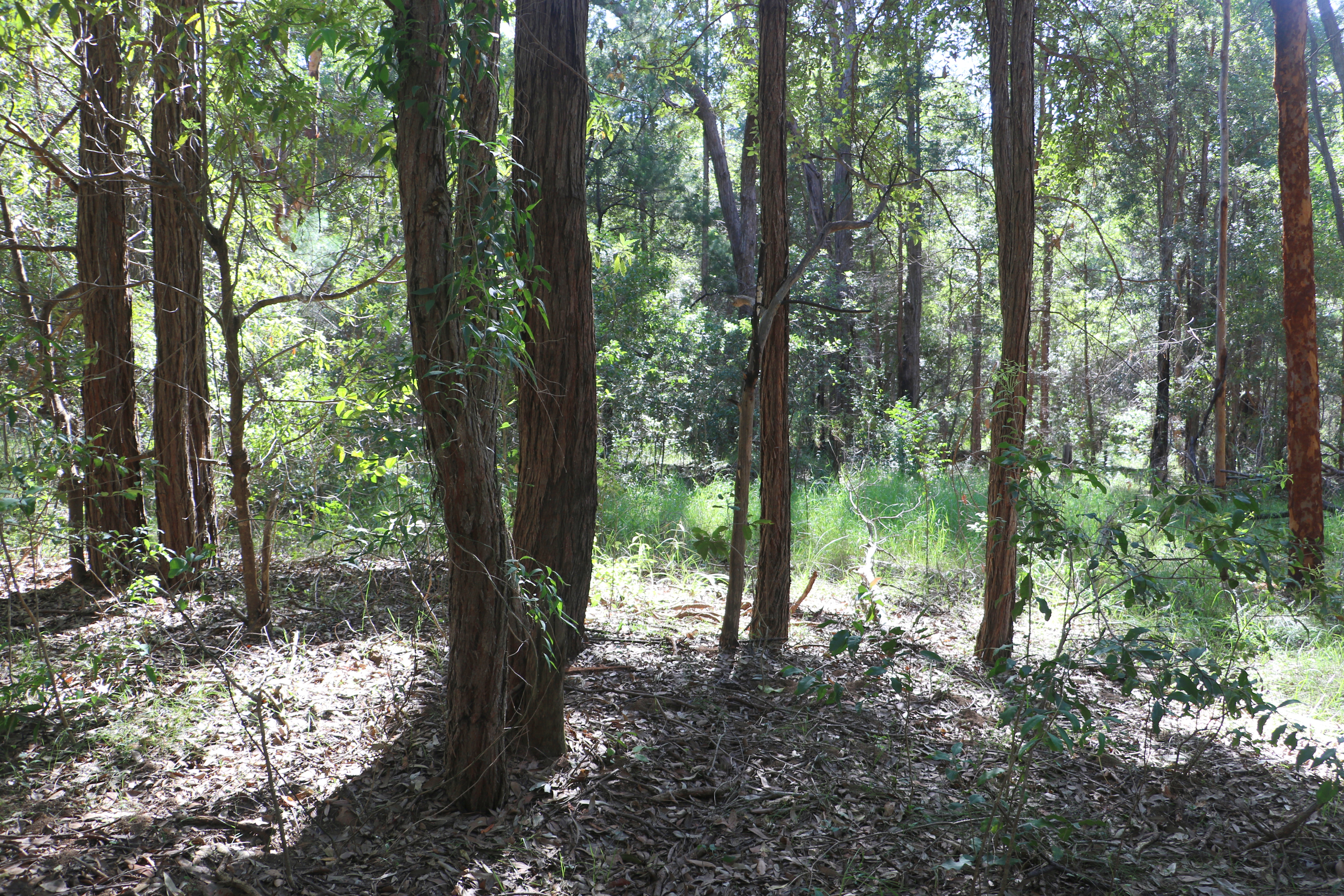
- Turpentine trees

- Location within New South Wales
- Location: New South Wales
- Nearest city: East Ryde, Sydney
- Coordinates: 33°48′22″S 151°7′46″E
- Area: 6.195 ha (15.31 acres)
- Established: 1980s
- Governing body: NSW National Parks & Wildlife Service
- Website: Official website

Wallumatta Nature Reserve, also called the Macquarie Hospital Bushland, is a 6-hectare (15-acre) nature reserve bushland area, surrounded by the residential suburb of East Ryde, in suburban Sydney, Australia. Once part of the Field of Mars of 1804, the reserve is the largest surviving area of Sydney Turpentine-Ironbark Forest, an endangered ecosystem. Soils are based on Ashfield Shale and Hawkesbury Sandstone.

The word "Wallumatta" is derived from the Eora language for the former local aboriginal inhabitants, meaning snapper (a local fish). The forest canopy is primarily made up of turpentine, grey ironbark, red mahogany and Sydney red gum. The tree, grey box is found here, though usually associated with the drier western areas of Sydney. The blueberry ash is also present, a common plant of the wetter more fertile areas of eastern New South Wales.

Native animals recorded include brushtail possum, grey-headed flying fox, blue-tongue lizard and red-bellied black snake. Feral foxes, domestic dogs and cats threaten the indigenous wildlife.

Wallumatta Nature reserve is treated as a "demonstration site", and much bush regeneration work has been carried out to remove weeds and encourage indigenous species. The nature reserve, titled Macquarie Hospital Bushland, was listed on the (now defunct) Register of the National Estate on 15 May 1990.

== See also ==
- Protected areas of New South Wales
