= F. H. Faulding & Co =

Former South Australian based pharmaceutical company

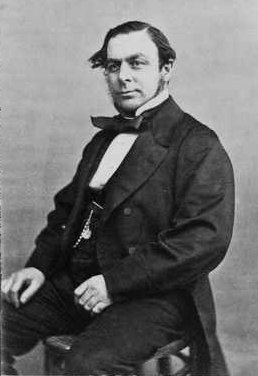
F.H. Faulding (1816–1868), c. 1855

Luther Scammell (1826–1910), c. 1865

L.R. Scammell (1858–1940), c. 1904

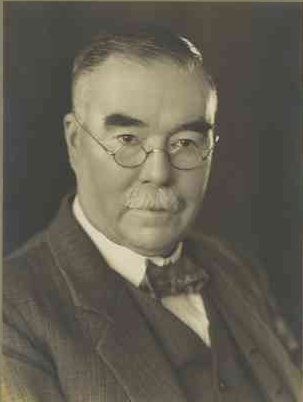
L.R. Scammell (1858–1940), c. 1939

F. H. Faulding & Co was a pharmaceutical company founded in Adelaide, Australia, in 1845 by Francis Hardey Faulding (23 August 1816 – 19 November 1868), a native of Swinefleet, near Goole in Yorkshire, son of Francis Faulding, a surgeon.

== History ==
Francis Hardey Faulding arrived in Sydney on the Nabob in February 1842, in the midst of an economic slump. He travelled on the brig Dorset to Adelaide in May, where he weathered the slump, and opened a pharmacy at 5 Rundle Street on 9 May 1845. Around this time he had an assistant, Joseph Bosisto, who left for Melbourne in 1851, where he famously explored the commercial value of eucalyptus oils as an antiseptic, and was elected MLA for Richmond in 1874.

The pharmacy flourished, so he purchased a warehouse in Clarence Place in the city and transferred the manufacturing and wholesale arms of the business there. In 1861 he entered into partnership with Luther Scammell (1826–1910). Scammell, also a Yorkshireman, received medical training at Guy's Hospital and arrived in Adelaide in 1849 to practice in the Burra mines, then subsequently set up business in Port Adelaide. Luther Scammell (1826–1910) married Lavinia Annette Bean ( –1904) in 1856

- William Joseph Scammell (1856–1928) married Catherine Matilda Samuel in 1889. An AEI student, he managed factory and warehouse in Sydney.
- Luther Robert Scammell (1858–1940) married Elizabeth Alice Gray in 1888.
- Lavinia Mary Scammell (1859–1915)
- Henry Scammell (1860–1860)
- Francis George Scammell (1861–1927) married Mary Alice Hannah Shannon in 1890.

Their daughters Mary Gwendoline ("Gwen", born 1893) and Ethelwyn Scammell (born 1897) were prominent musicians

- Alfred Faulding Scammell (1863–1886) married Alice Mary Boswood Samuel (died 1944) in 1885
- Charles Balantyne Thomas Scammell (1864–1880)
- Frederick James Stephenson Scammell (1864– )
- Ernest Arthur Scammell (1865–1946) married Minnie Elvira Fayers (died 1955) in 1904.
- Annette Emily Scammell (1866– )
- Florence Euphemia Scammell (1868–1950) married Alfred Corker Minchin in 1888.
- Sydney Taunton Scammell (1876– )

Faulding had numerous other interests: In 1847 he was one of the founders of the South Australian Institute (another was business competitor William Bickford (1815–1850)). On 16 December 1864 he was elected councillor for the Hindmarsh ward of the Adelaide City Council. He was a director of the Bank of Adelaide and trustee of the Savings Bank of South Australia. He was also an active member of the South Australian Free Rifle Corps.

On 16 September 1852 he married Eliza Macgeorge at her home "Urr Brae" later "Urrbrae", the famous home of Peter Waite. (His sister Eliza (1824 – 2 February 1907) married Thomas Waterhouse a week previously.) In 1857 they left the residence on Stephens Place corner of North Terrace for an extended stay in England. He died without issue in 1868, aged 52 at his mansion "Wooton Lea" near Glen Osmond. On 1 December 1869 the widowed Eliza Faulding married family friend Anthony Forster but they divorced six years later.

Scammell became sole owner on the founder's death in 1868. He immediately appointed Philip Dakers as the company's London buyer, and in 1876 built a prominent warehouse in King William Street later expanding to James Place which became the front office address. He was forced to retire in 1889 when the Bank of Adelaide threatened foreclosure after a series of failed mining and pastoral speculations. Two of his sons, Luther Robert Scammell FCS LSA (20 March 1858 – 8 April 1940) and William J. Scammell (26 October 1856 – 19 April 1928) acquired the manufacturing and wholesaling operations, and the business name, in 1888; the retail shops were sold to John White to reduce the debt to the bank.

Scammell Snr. was also involved in politics and, with Thomas Hardy and Sir Samuel Davenport, was a pioneer of South Australia's olive oil industry, producing its first oil in 1864.

The company expanded under the two brothers. In 1890 they founded a branch in rented premises in Perth, and from 1894 under the management of Walter Wesley Garner, it thrived and expanded, later setting up a warehouse and laboratory in Murray Street. A Sydney branch was founded in 1899 in O'Connell Street under J. P. Gold, and in Newcastle under J. P. F. Gwynne. Later W. J. Scammell took charge and a factory was built in Redfern.

Alfred F. Scammell & R. G. Scammell (sons of L. R. Scammell), and Rupert Boswood Scammell & George Vance Scammell (born 1903) (sons of W. J. Scammell), became directors of the company, the latter two at the Sydney branch. The former two moved to Sydney in 1911.

In June 1921 Faulding & Co. became a private company, with L. R. Scammell as chairman and managing director. He continued to run the firm's affairs until 1935. Day-to-day management then passed to his elder son Alfred, but Luther remained chairman of directors until his death in 1940.

In 1971 Faulding's purchased Jasol Chemical Products, an Adelaide manufacturer of unsophisticated but effective and popular sterilising and cleaning agents.

Dr. Ed Tweddell was appointed managing director in 1988 and entered into a joint venture with CSIRO to develop new drugs under Keating government's "Factor f" scheme, and later the Pharmaceutical Industry Investment Program. In 1999, Fauldings were promised $40 million in federal funding over five years in return for industry development. Faulding Pharmaceuticals expanded its northern hemisphere operations and in 2001 the Mayne Nickless group (as Mayne Pharma) took over the company, whereupon Tweddell resigned from the board. Mayne Pharma was bought out in 2007 by the US Hospira conglomerate, which in turn was acquired by Pfizer in 2015. Despite initially announcing plans to invest in the manufacturing facility at Thebarton in 2016, in February 2017 the corporation announced its intention to close it by the end of 2021.

== Manufacturing and laboratory facilities ==
Two of the Faulding company's major innovations were a process for distillation of eucalyptus oil, and a test for determining the eucalyptol content of the oil. Faulding's success was founded on eucalyptus oil, which formed the basis of an antiseptic marketed as "Solyptol" (for soluble eucalyptus oil). The test became the industry standard, and the British Pharmacopoeia standard method in 1898. Other well-known products were Milk Emulsion (a pleasant alternative to cod-liver oil), Solyptol Soap, (which won a gold medal at the Franco-British Exhibition in London in 1908), Solyptol disinfectant, junket tablets, cordials, essential oils for perfumery and reagents such as Epsom salts, most produced in its factory in Thebarton on the land once occupied by Bean Brothers' tannery. In 1962 Fauldings were listed as having factories and laboratories in the area bounded by Holland St, Winwood St, Reid St and Beans Rd (now Dew St.), Thebarton.

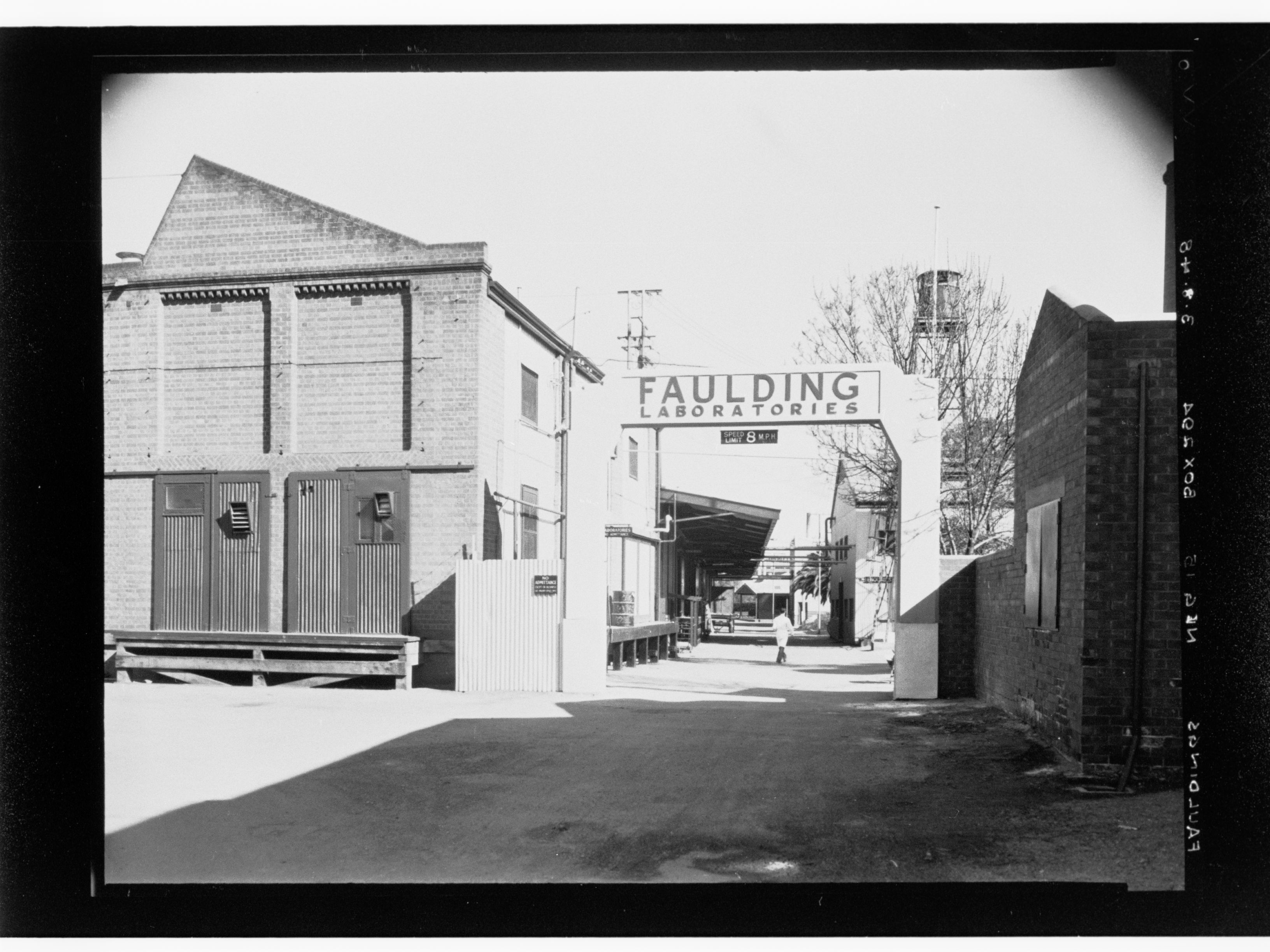

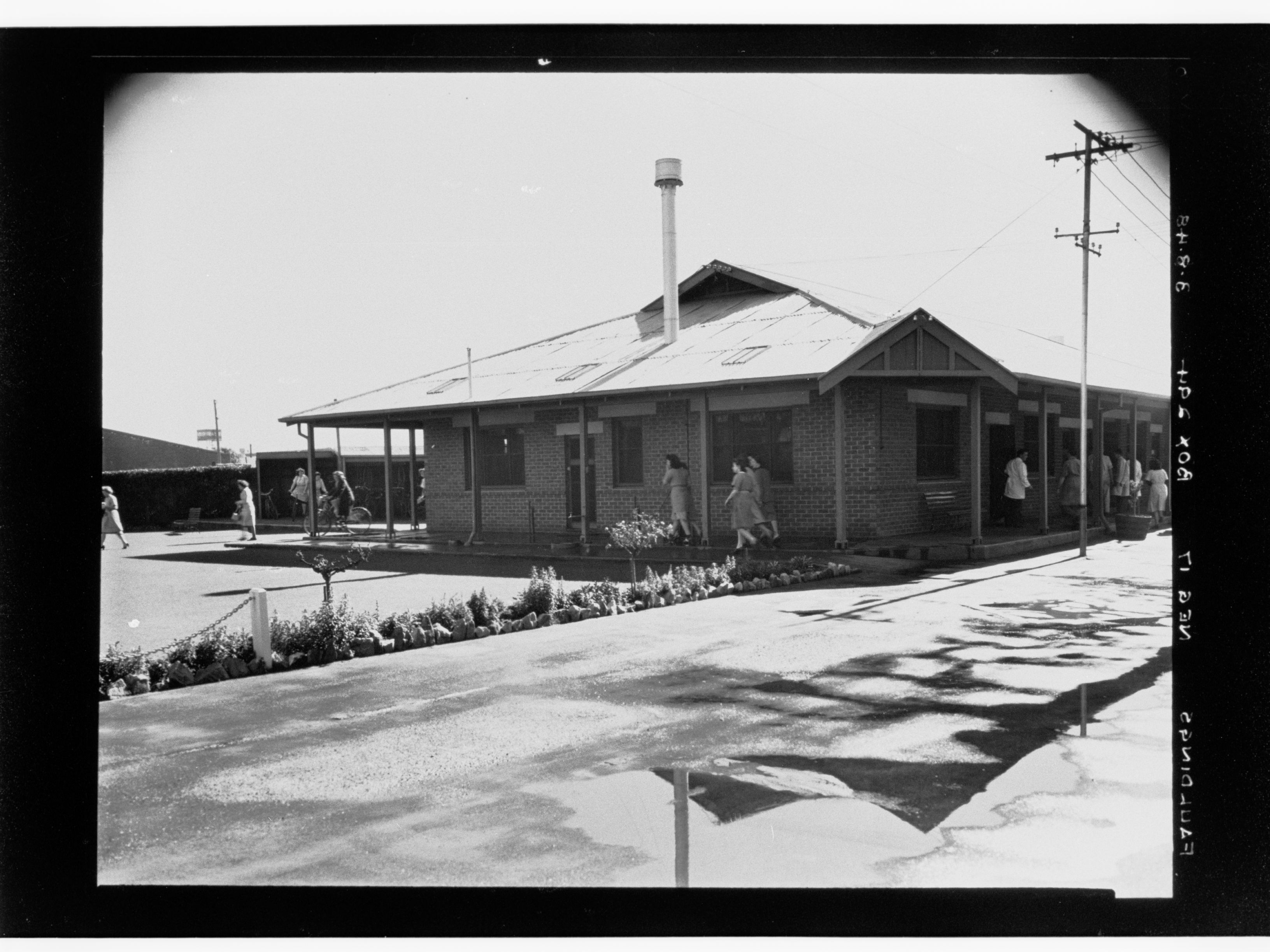

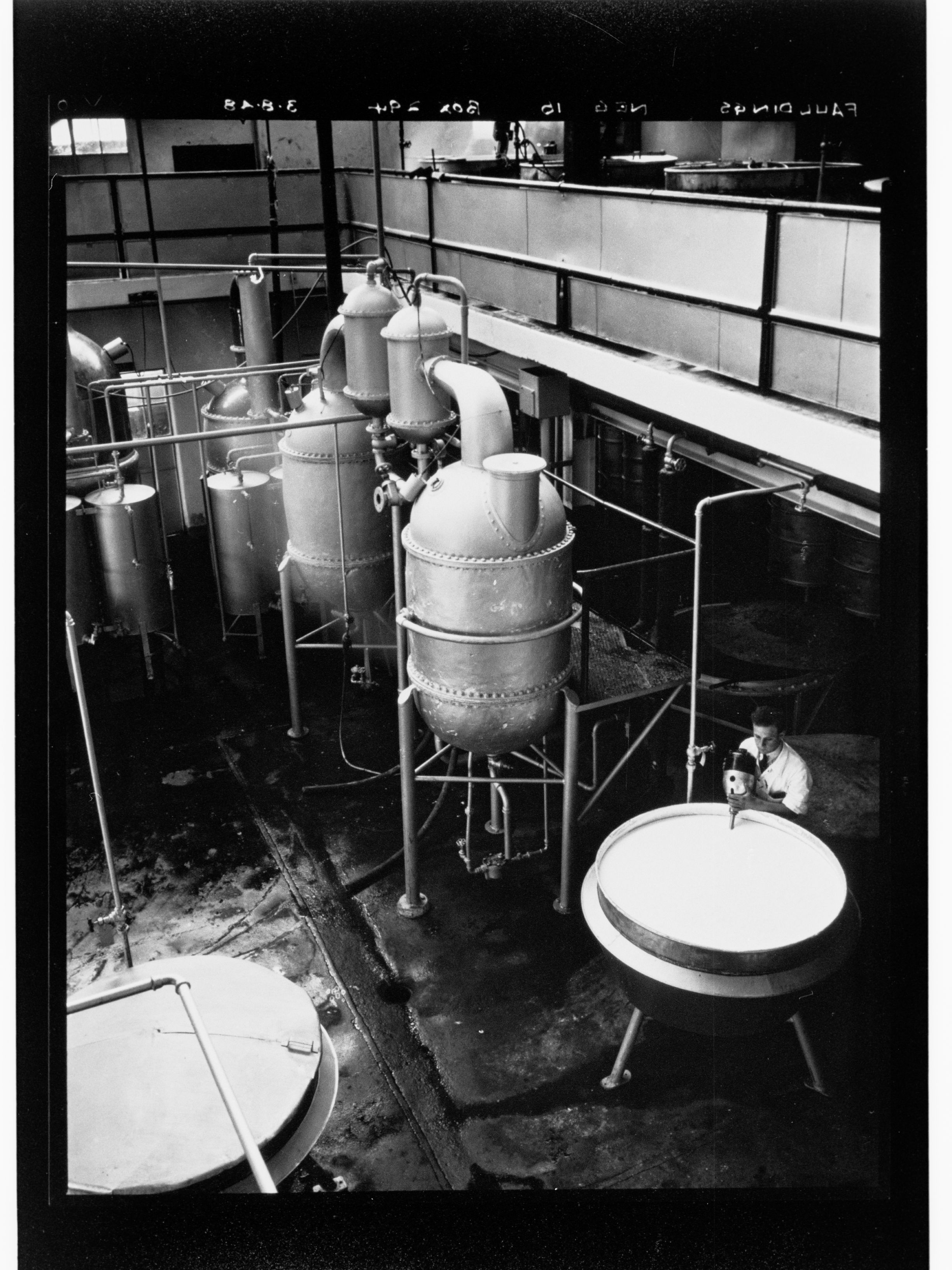

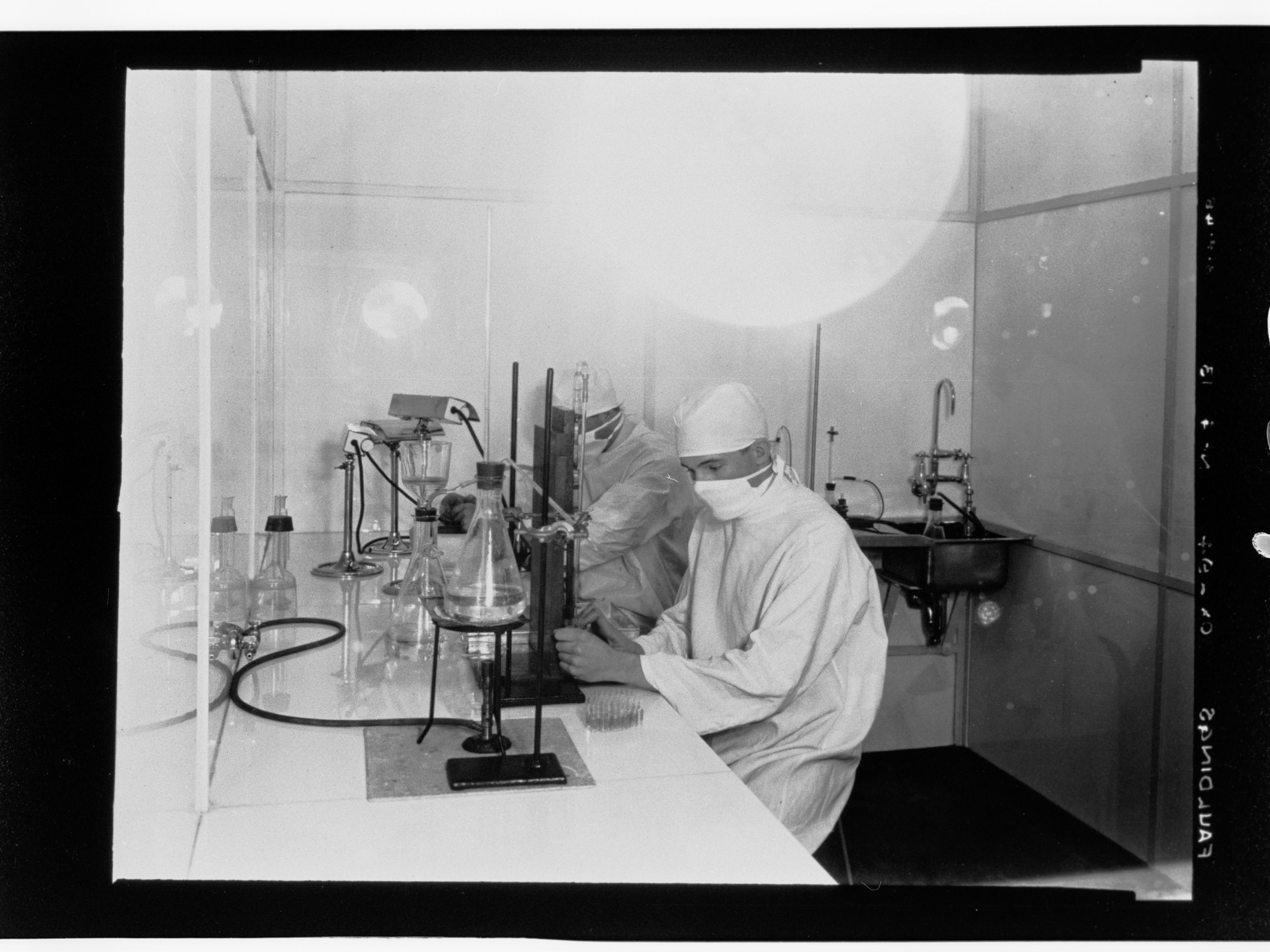

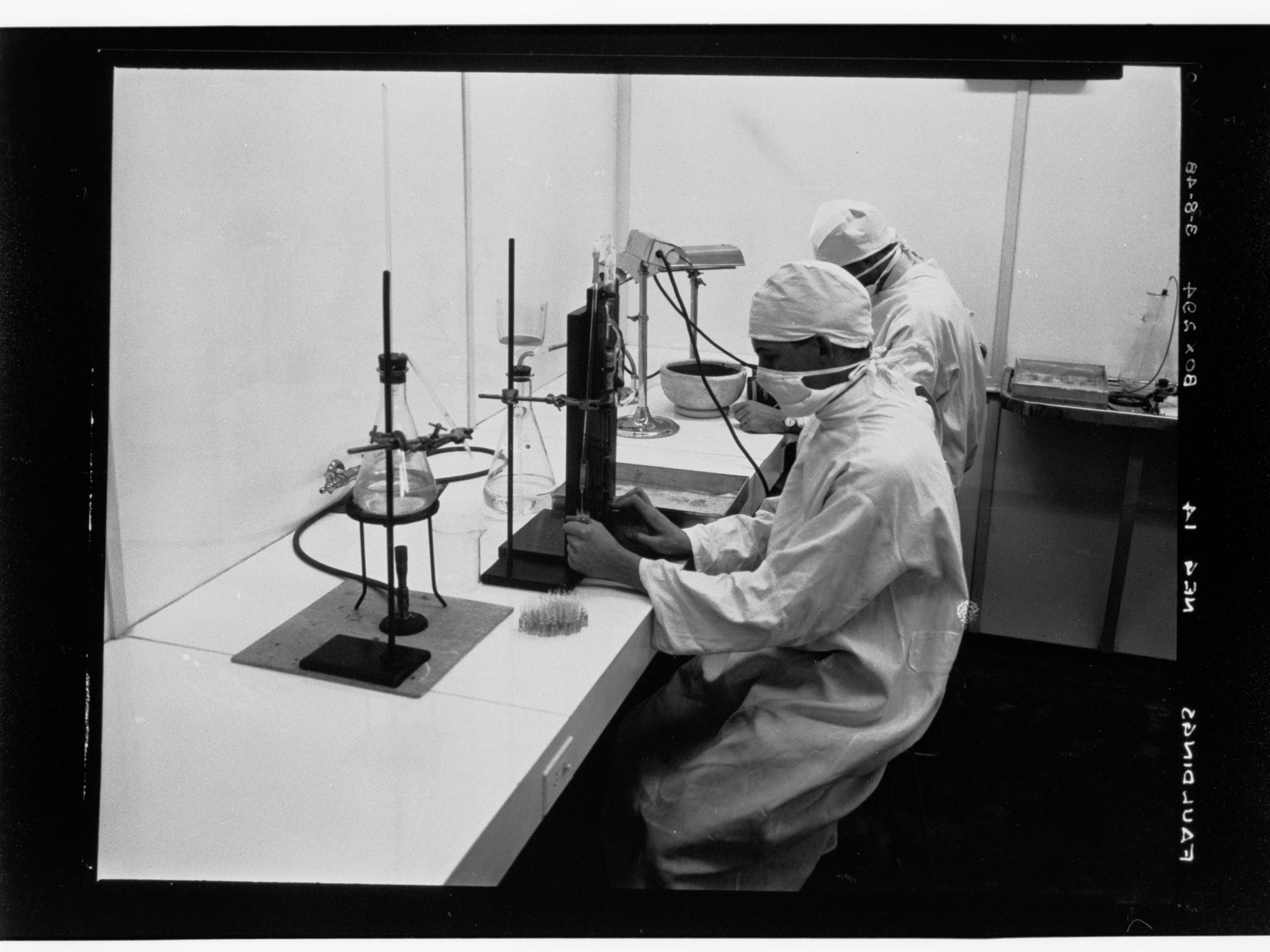

== Faulding's Journal ==
From 1906 to 1919, a monthly magazine Faulding's Journal was published covering a similar range of topics to today's New Scientist. The editor was journalist W. J. P. Giddings. (Note: William John Peter Giddings (died 1938) was an Adelaide journalist who married Auroa Killicoat in 1897. Their daughter Marjorie Mary Giddings married Leslie Edgar Masters in 1923 and had a son Peter Eric Masters in 1925.)

== X-ray experiments ==
In 1896, Samuel Barbour, Faulding's chief chemist, and W. T. Rowe, who had studied at the University of Adelaide under Sir William Bragg, experimented with an X-ray tube brought back from England by Barbour. The first results were rather modest as the induction coil used was only capable of a two-inch spark (around 50 kV). Much higher energies were achieved when they borrowed a twelve-inch spark unit (around 190 kV) (Note: From chart: 4" = 110 kV; 8" = 150 kV; 12" = 190 kV; 16" = 230 kV. Output from the coil (very like an automotive ignition coil) was highly asymmetrical, and until development of the oscilloscope, spark length was the most reliable voltage measuring technique.) from Sir Charles Todd. Rowe ran the X-ray clinic for Fauldings in 1896 and 1897 when Barbour sold the unit to Sir Joseph Verco.

== Dental, veterinary and scientific products ==
Faulding acted as manufacturers' agents for such equipment as dental appliances and chairs as well as stocking hundreds of thousands of artificial teeth. They also sold a wide range of scientific glassware and laboratory equipment.

== Bibliography ==
- A Century of Medical Progress 1845–1945 F. H. Faulding & Co. Ltd, Adelaide 1945
- Camel, L. R. A History of F. H. Faulding & Co. Ltd 1931
- Donovan, Peter; Tweddell, Ed The Faulding Formula. A History of F. H. Faulding & Co. Ltd. Wakefield Press, South Australia 1995
