= Wallumatta =

Area of Northern Sydney

Wallumatta was the original name given to the Ryde-Hunters Hill area of Northern Sydney, Australia. Prior to the time that the area was known as Kissing Point, Wallumatta was the formal title and was named in honour of the area's native inhabitants: The Wallumettagal Aboriginal tribe.

Although present-day demographics indicate that less than 0.4% of the City of Ryde has Aboriginal background, the name Wallumatta survives in modern-day street names in Newport and Caringbah, as well as in Lower Northern Sydney at the Wallumatta Nature Reserve in North Ryde. Several community groups have also been named after Wallumatta, including the Wallumetta Scout Fellowship.

== Wallumatta Nature Reserve ==
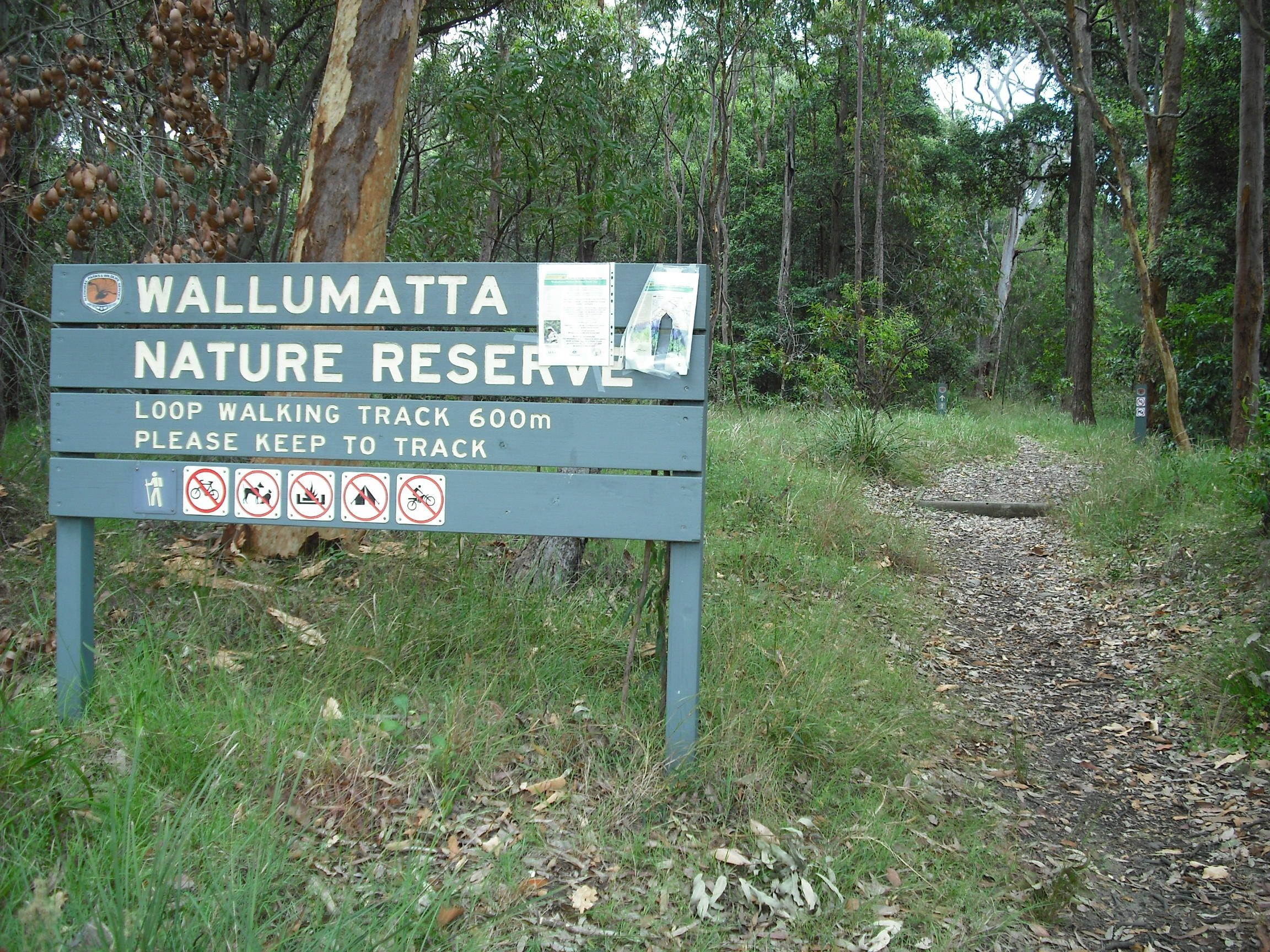
Wallumatta Nature Reserve, North Ryde

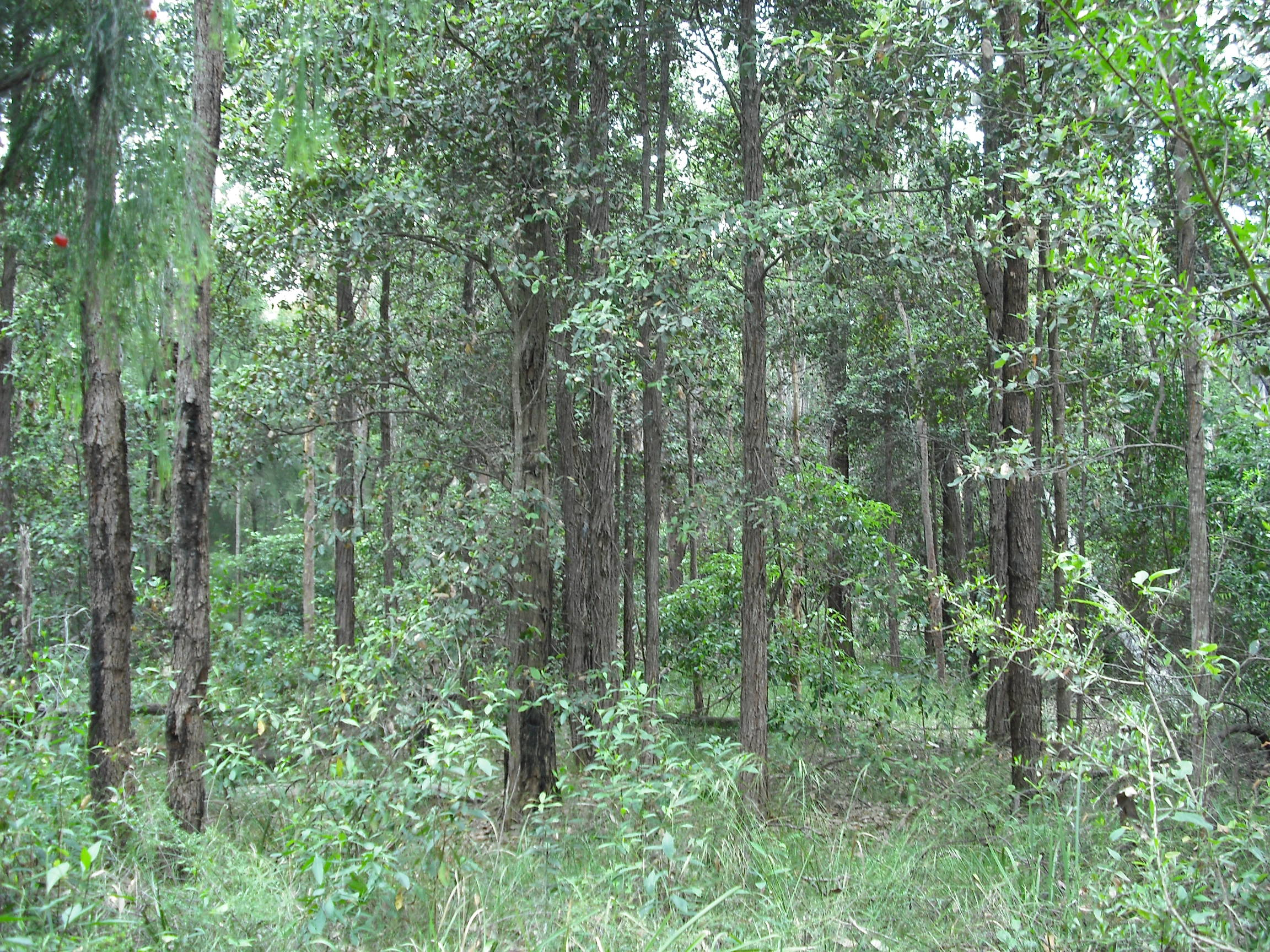
Wallumatta Nature Reserve, North Ryde

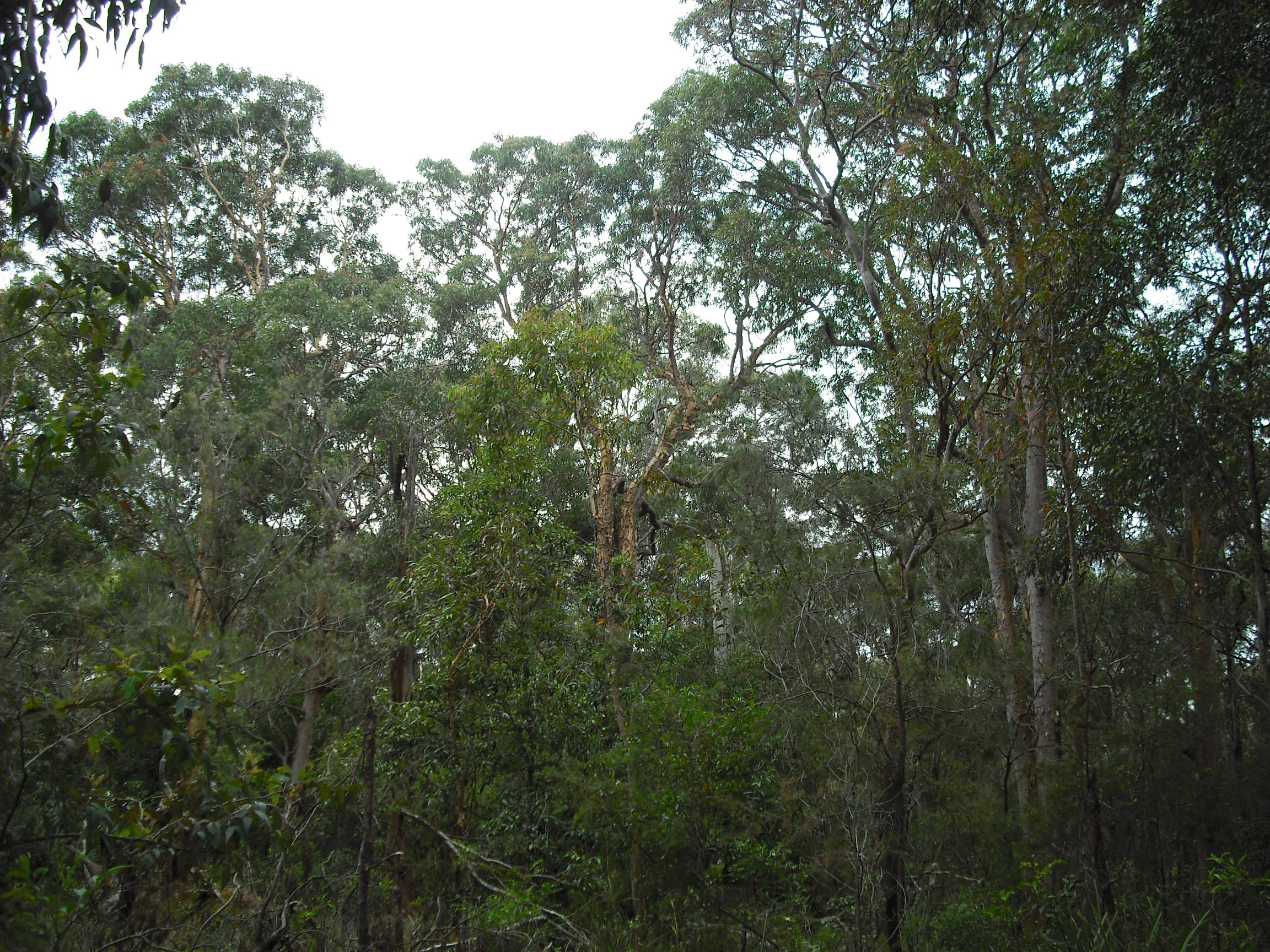
Wallumatta Nature Reserve, North Ryde

The Wallumatta Nature Reserve is a small and critically endangered remnant of preserved bushland located at the corner of Twin and Cressy Roads, North Ryde, and is significant for being the largest remaining expanse of endangered Sydney Turpentine-Ironbark Forest, which is an ecological community of plants unique to the Sydney bioregion.

With the arrival of European settlement this small reserve was originally part of the Field of Mars Reserve in 1804. During the 1950s it was part of a larger parcel of land set aside for further development of the North Ryde Psychiatric Centre (now Macquarie Hospital) In the 1980s the Macquarie Hospital Bushland was saved from further building development.

The reserve is an important resource for scientific research and environmental education. It is popular with botanists, nature lovers, school excursions. Dedicated bushcare groups help preserve this valuable remnant of original bushland.

The 6.2ha reserve features a clearly signposted 0.6 km walking trail. It is open to the public daily from sunrise to sunset, subject to fire danger or bad weather. Admission is free.

The heartland of this type of forest once covered some 26,000 hectares west to Guildford, and North of Parramatta River from Ryde to Castle Hill, as well as on the shale ridge caps in the Hornsby Plateau and into areas of the inner western suburbs.

== See also ==
- Protected areas of New South Wales
