= Soul Mates (TV series) =

- Genre: Comedy
- Created by: Christiaan Van Vuuren; Connor Van Vuuren; Nicholas Boshier
- Written by: Christiaan Van Vuuren; Connor Van Vuuren
- Directed by: Christiaan Van Vuuren; Connor Van Vuuren
- Starring: Christiaan Van Vuuren; Nicholas Boshier
- Country of origin: Australia
- Original language: English
- No. of seasons: 2
- No. of episodes: 12

Production
- Executive producers: Rick Kalowski; Greg Waters; Abe Forsythe
- Producer: Chloe Rickard
- Running time: 29 mins
- Production companies: Van Vuuren Bros and Ludo Production; Soul HQ

Original release
- Network: ABC2
- Release: 23 October 2014 – 7 September 2016

Soul Mates is a 2014 Australian comedy series created by and starring Christiaan Van Vuuren and Nicholas Boshier, co-written by Van Vuuren's brother Connor Van Vuuren, screened on ABC2. It features the same characters, as friends who met in a different era, as Bondi Hipsters (2011).

Soul Mates follows the story of a couple of friends who are continually drawn together across the course of human history. In 2014, they are fashion-obsessed hipsters from Bondi Beach. In prehistoric times, they experience all of life's firsts as a couple of cavemen. In 1981 they are two New Zealand secret agents known as the Kiwi Assassins. In the year 2093 they are working in a time travel agency called Ticky Time Tours, tackling time travel conundrums.

Previous online projects by Van Vuuren and Boshier include Bondi Hipsters, Beached Az, Trent from Punchy and The Fully Sick Rapper.

== Plot summary ==
=== Cavemen ===
Sticks (Boshier) and Rocky (Van Vuuren) are two cavemen, who tackle the new questions of prehistoric life. How do you find a woman? Is it alright to eat babies, or gods? They also tackle Rocky's self-destructive addictions to staring at the sun and spinning.

In the second series, Rocky returns and introduces the tribe to the concepts of capitalism, management, currency, banking and democracy.

=== Kiwi Assassins ===
Possum exterminator Terry Thinge (Boshier) is recruited by Mum (Rachel House), the head of New Zealand's Munustry of Dufinse, and paired with disgraced rugby player Roger Blade (Van Vuuren). Their first mission as the Kiwi Assassins is to convince a young actor named Russell Crowe to forsake Australia and return to his native New Zealand. Their next task is to restore New Zealand's dairy supremacy by infiltrating a farm where the Aussies claim to have invented "Fizzy Milk".

In the second series, Roger and Thinge go undercover at an Australian school whose rugby team has beaten the New Zealand Under-16s for several years in a row. Using an extract from the heart of Phar Lap, the school is enhancing and brainwashing Kiwi students into thinking they are Australian. Thinge's relationship with Mum and his step-son Roger is under strain, making Roger susceptible to Australian brainwashing.

=== Bondi Hipsters ===
Adrian "Aids" Archer (Boshier) and Dom Nader (Van Vuuren) are hipsters living together in Bondi. They are setting up a fashion label and seek yoga master Phoenix as their brand ambassador. Dom secretly works as a vacuum cleaner salesman at 'The Vacuum Guys', and their friendship and label are put in peril when Adrian finds out.

In the second series, Adrian has sworn off ever using "the fashion" again. When his and Dom's "closed cafe" concept fails, Adrian is tempted by a charismatic yoga teacher to exploit a shocking secret from Dom's past.

=== Time Travel Agency (Series 1) ===
Best mates Rob (Boshier) and Dave (Van Vuuren) work at a time travel agency called Travel Time Time Travel, and are planning to 'pitch' Time Tiki tours, an epic party across all the best parties in human history. Rob is given a promotion and promises it won't change him, but he returns upgraded to the terrifying cyborg Roboss 2000. A resentful Dave fetches himself from another timeline to be his new best mate, and their ensuing adventures result in the deaths of Hitler, Jesus and eventually Dave himself.

=== Ancient Egypt (Series 2) ===
Seti (Boshier) is the bastard son of Egyptian queen Hatshepsut, and the brother of the psychotic half-bird Thutmose. Assigned to construct a tomb for Thutmose, Seti works with a slave named Amram (Van Vuuren), who teaches him a thing or two and whom he comes to admire.

== Series overview ==
Season	Episodes	Originally released	
Season	Episodes	First released	Last released
1	6	23 October 2014	27 November 2014
2	6	3 August 2016	7 September 2016

== Episodes ==
(Episode information retrieved from Australian Television Information Archive).

=== Series 1 (2014) ===
No. overall	No. in season	Title	Directed by	Written by	Original release date
1	1	"Death and Rebirth"	Connor Van Vuuren & Christiaan Van Vuuren	Connor Van Vuuren & Christiaan Van Vuuren	23 October 2014
2	2	"Creation"	Connor Van Vuuren & Christiaan Van Vuuren	Connor Van Vuuren & Christiaan Van Vuuren	30 October 2014
3	3	"Above and Beyond"	Connor Van Vuuren & Christiaan Van Vuuren	Connor Van Vuuren & Christiaan Van Vuuren	6 November 2014
4	4	"Self Destruction"	Connor Van Vuuren & Christiaan Van Vuuren	Connor Van Vuuren & Christiaan Van Vuuren	13 November 2014
5	5	"Father Time"	Connor Van Vuuren & Christiaan Van Vuuren	Connor Van Vuuren & Christiaan Van Vuuren	20 November 2014
6	6	"Becoming"	Connor Van Vuuren & Christiaan Van Vuuren	Connor Van Vuuren & Christiaan Van Vuuren	27 November 2014

=== Series 2 (2016) ===
No. overall	No. in season	Title	Directed by	Written by	Original release date
7	1	"Episode 1"	Connor Van Vuuren & Christiaan Van Vuuren	Connor Van Vuuren & Christiaan Van Vuuren	3 August 2016
8	2	"Episode 2"	Connor Van Vuuren & Christiaan Van Vuuren	Connor Van Vuuren & Christiaan Van Vuuren	10 August 2016
9	3	"Episode 3"	Connor Van Vuuren & Christiaan Van Vuuren	Connor Van Vuuren & Christiaan Van Vuuren	17 August 2016
10	4	"Episode 4"	Connor Van Vuuren & Christiaan Van Vuuren	Connor Van Vuuren & Christiaan Van Vuuren	24 August 2016
11	5	"Episode 5"	Connor Van Vuuren & Christiaan Van Vuuren	Connor Van Vuuren & Christiaan Van Vuuren	31 August 2016
12	6	"Episode 6"	Connor Van Vuuren & Christiaan Van Vuuren	Connor Van Vuuren & Christiaan Van Vuuren	7 September 2016

== Awards and nominations ==
=== ARIA Music Awards ===
The ARIA Music Awards are a set of annual ceremonies presented by Australian Recording Industry Association (ARIA), which recognise excellence, innovation, and achievement across all genres of the music of Australia. They commenced in 1987.

Year	Nominee / work	Award	Result	Ref.
2015	"Fuhck the Bahnks" (by Bondi Hipsters)	Best Comedy Release	Nominated	
