= Connor Van Vuuren =

Australian stuntman, writer, actor and director

- Born: Sydney, Australia
- Education: University of Technology Sydney; National Institute of Dramatic Art
- Occupations: Actor, writer, stunt actor, director, producer
- Years active: 2010–present
- Known for: Soul Mates, Bondi Hipsters
- Height: 6 ft 0 in (183 cm)
- Relatives: Christiaan Van Vuuren (brother)

YouTube information
- Channel: Van Vuuren Bros
- Years active: 2009–present
- Genre: Comedy
- Subscribers: 129,000
- Views: 35 million
- Last updated: 4 August 2026

Connor Van Vuuren (/ˈvjʊərən/) is an Australian stuntman, writer, actor, and director. He co-wrote and co-directed the TV mini-series Bondi Hipsters with his brother Christiaan Van Vuuren. He has created, written, directed and starred in two seasons of ABC's Soul Mates series in 2014 and 2016 as Phoenix with his brother and Nicholas Boshier, and as a stunt actor in Mad Max: Fury Road (2015), The Hobbit: The Battle of the Five Armies (2014), and The Wolverine (2013).

== Early life ==
Van Vuuren grew up in Cronulla. His parents met in London, his father a South African and his mother a Kiwi. He graduated with a degree in Media Arts and Production from the University of Technology Sydney and trained in acting at the National Institute of Dramatic Art (NIDA).

== Filmography ==
=== Films ===
Year	Title	Role
2010	The Lovers Are Losing	Dane
2011	A Few Best Men	Stunts
2012	Sick	Conrad Van Heerden
2012	Too Late	Director
2013	The Wolverine	Stunts
2014	Brawl	N/A
2014	The Hobbit: The Battle of the Five Armies	Stunts
2014	I, Frankenstein	Stunts
2015	Mad Max: Fury Road	Stunts
2016	Gods of Egypt	Stunts

=== Television ===
Year	Title	Role	Episodes
2010	Kokoda	Stunts	2
2010	K9	Drake	11
2011	Bondi Hipsters	Phoenix/Director/Writer	N/A
2011	Wild Boys	Grady McLean	1
2013	The Elegant Gentleman's Guide to Knife Fighting	Director	2
2014	Soul Mates	Phoenix/Director/Writer/Producer	6
2014	Love Child	Stunts	1
2018	Mystery Road	Reece Dale	

== Nominations ==
Australian Directors Guild Awards

- 2017: Best direction in a TV or Svod comedy program (shared with Christiaan Van Vuuren)
