= Coachmaster =

- Industry: Bus manufacturing
- Founded: February 1958
- Defunct: April 1972
- Headquarters: Sydney
- Owner: Saint family

Coachmaster was an Australian bus bodybuilder in Sydney.

== History ==
Coachmaster was founded in 1956, bodying 146 buses, primarily for New South Wales operators, until ceasing in 1972. It was majority owned by the Saint family, proprietors of Peakhurst Bus Company.

Operators to purchase Coachmaster bodied buses included McVicar's Bus Service, Hunters Hill Bus Company, Peakhurst Bus Company, Punchbowl Bus Company and Westbus.
