= Jarod Green =

Australian film director, screenwriter and animator

Jarod Green (born 23 May 1981) is an Australian film director, screenwriter and animator most notable for his work on the short film Beached Whale and the television series Beached Az. Together with actor Nicholas Boshier, Green is also the creator of the online fictional character Trent from Punchy.

== Career ==
Whilst studying, Green worked on several films both domestically and abroad, including Master and Commander: The Far Side of the World (2004), the New South Wales Film and Television Office and Avatar (2009).

In April 2008, he directed and animated the short film Beached Whale starring his high school friends.

In March 2010, Green was announced as a finalist in the Cleo Bachelor of the Year Award, coming third overall.
