= Lynn Wood =

Lynn Wood or variants may refer to:

== People ==
- Lynn Faulds Wood (1948–2020), British TV presenter and cancer campaigner
- Linda Wood, harpist on the Fly with the Wind 1976 album by jazz pianist McCoy Tyner
- L. Lin Wood (born 1952), attorney and conspiracy theorist
- Lynne Woods, producer of The Wiley Park Singers from 1995

== Other uses ==
- Lynn Woods Reservation, Massachusetts, US

== See also ==
- Lynnwood (disambiguation)
