= Punchbowl, New South Wales =

Punchbowl
- Suburb
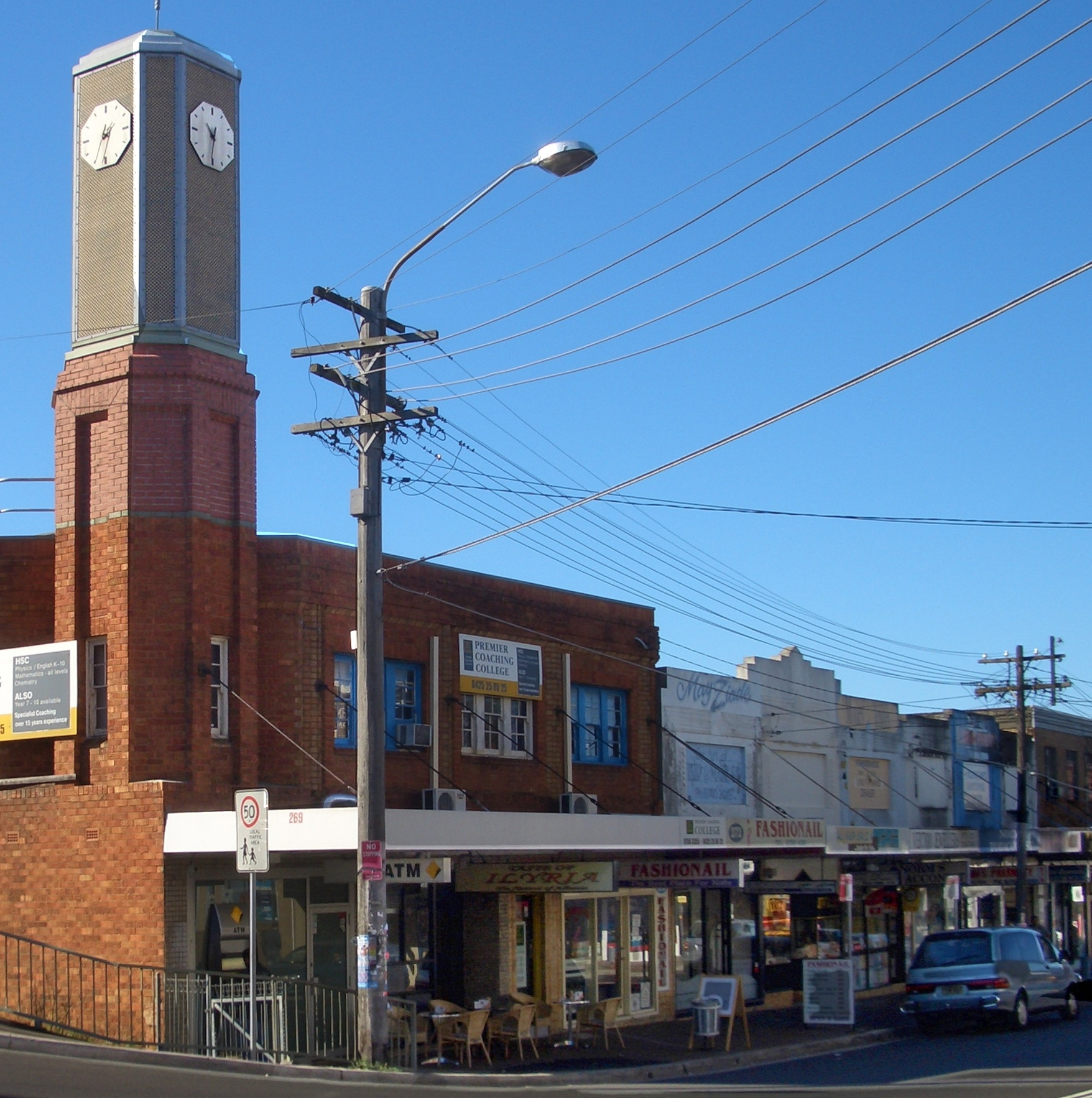
- The Boulevarde, Punchbowl c. 2007

- Interactive map of Punchbowl
- Country: Australia
- State: New South Wales
- LGA: City of Canterbury-Bankstown
- Location: 17 km (11 mi) south-west of Sydney CBD
- Established: 1869

Government
  - State electorate: Bankstown
  - Federal divisions: Watson; Banks
- Elevation: 40 m (130 ft)

Population
  - Total: 21,384 (SAL 2021)
- Postcode: 2196
Suburbs around Punchbowl
Mount Lewis	Greenacre	Lakemba
Bankstown	Punchbowl	Wiley Park
Padstow	Riverwood	Roselands

Punchbowl is a suburb in Western Sydney in the state of New South Wales, Australia. It is located 17 kilometres (11 mi) South-West of the Sydney central business district and in the local government area of the City of Canterbury-Bankstown. At the 2021 census, Punchbowl had a population of 21,384.

== History ==
The Astoria Theatre opened in 1935

Punchbowl is named for a circular valley, called "the punchbowl", which is actually located in the nearby suburb of Belfield at the intersection of Coronation Parade, Georges River and Punchbowl Roads. This feature gave its name to "Punch Bowl Road" (now Punchbowl Road). In the 1830s, an inn built by George Faulkener, close to the corner of Liverpool Road, was called the Punch and Bowl. John Stephens had a property there in the 1830s, and his son is mentioned in the Wells Gazetteer in 1848: "Clairville or Punchbowl, in the Parishes of St George and Bankstown, is the property of Sir Alfred Stephens". When a railway station opened on this road in 1909, three kilometres (1.9 mi) away from the 'punch bowl' itself, the surrounding suburb came to be known as Punchbowl.

In the 1920s and 1930s, Punchbowl was a higher-class suburb, with a number of popular theatres that were closed down or demolished thirty years later. The Punchbowl Astoria opened on 17 July 1935 with seating for 915 persons. The final programme was shown on 4 February 1959. The Astoria was eventually gutted and refitted as a three-storey office building. The Punchbowl Regent was situated on the corner of The Boulevarde and Matthews Street. Operated by Enterprise Theatres Ltd, the Regent opened on Saturday 24 May 1923, showing The White Rose. It was a large cinema with seating for 1,287 patrons. The last programme was shown on 4 February 1959. The Regent was demolished in August 1964 and replaced by a block of shops. The Punchbowl Maintenance Depot was closed to the storage of electric trains in 1995.

Until 1987, Roselands was a neighbourhood within Punchbowl, though they still share the same postcode today (2196).

== Commercial area ==
Punchbowl has a relatively small shopping centre, although the selection is diverse. It thrived until the advent of Roselands Shopping Centre and Bankstown Square in the late 1960s and its bisection by the upgrading of Punchbowl Road in the 1970s. It is centred on Punchbowl railway station, along The Boulevarde and Punchbowl Road. Local businesses and clubs reflect the diversity of the population. Punchbowl RSL was located on The Boulevarde until it closed in 2010, and The Mirage Hotel is on Punchbowl Road. Lebanese cuisine is well regarded in the suburb, to the extent that culinary walking tours of Punchbowl sell out months ahead. There are a number of Lebanese sweet shops in the suburb. In 2009, a gym opened at the Astoria theatre site area.

For many years, Jack Walsh International Cycles, on Punchbowl Road, was one of the longest-serving shops in Punchbowl. It had been selling and repairing bicycles for over 60 years, until December 2007 when Walsh was unable to continue the business.

In December 2013, a new shopping centre, "The Broadway Plaza", was opened in Punchbowl "Broadway", near its train station. It comprises two levels of retail stores including Woolworths and Chemist Warehouse. The Plaza is surrounded by a complex of seven blocks of new apartments.

== Transport ==
Canterbury Road and Punchbowl Road provide the major road links into the suburb. The Boulevarde and South Terrace are also main roads. Punchbowl railway station is located on the Bankstown line of the Sydney Trains network. The line was opened in 1895 and electrified in 1926. The station was closed on 30 September 2024 to allow for the line to be converted to Sydney Metro standards; the Metro trains will subsequently serve the rebranded Metro North West & Bankstown Line.

The Punchbowl Road railway bridge replaced an old two-lane bridge in 1981. The foundations of the old bridge can still be seen west of the current one. The new bridge greatly aided traffic flow through the area but at the cost of effectively cutting the shopping centre in half.

== Housing ==
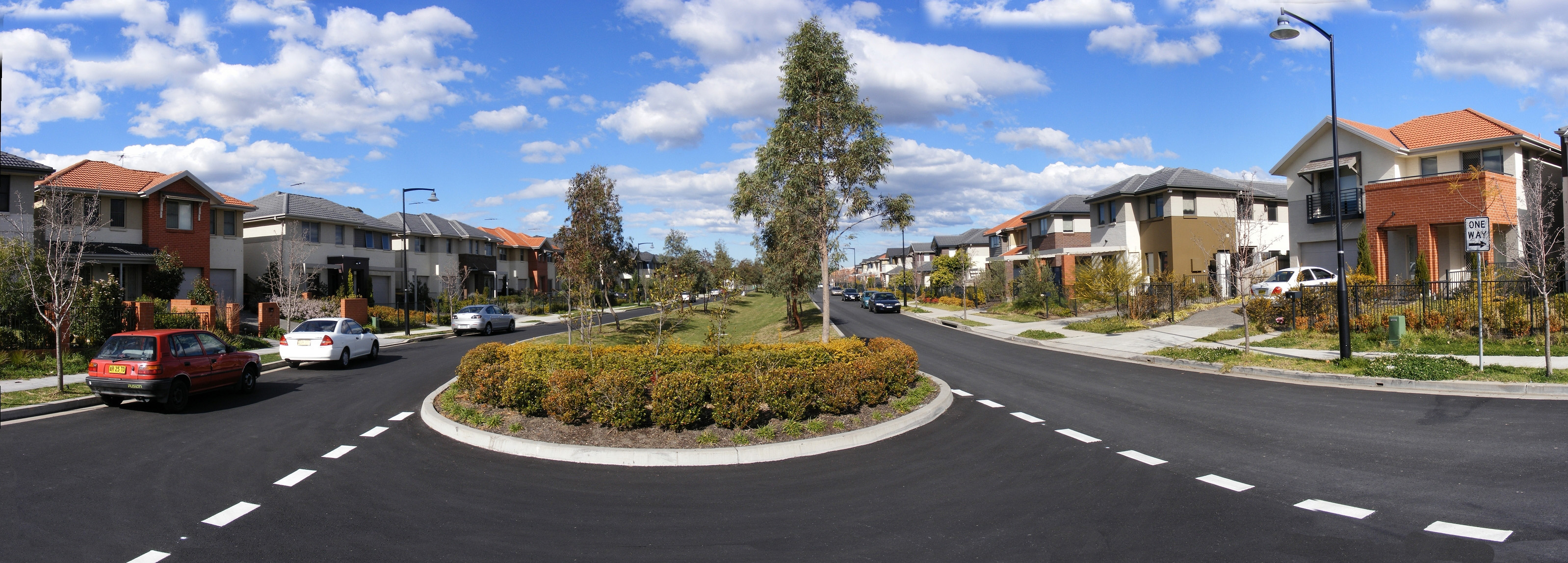
Newly built houses in a new street in Punchbowl

Punchbowl is a mainly residential suburb. Much of the suburb was developed in the late 19th century and early 20th century, especially after the railway line to Bankstown was built. The suburb features a mixture of Federation, Art Deco and contemporary homes. Parts of Punchbowl have been redeveloped since the turn of the 21st century, with flats, townhouses and modern detached houses built.

== Schools ==
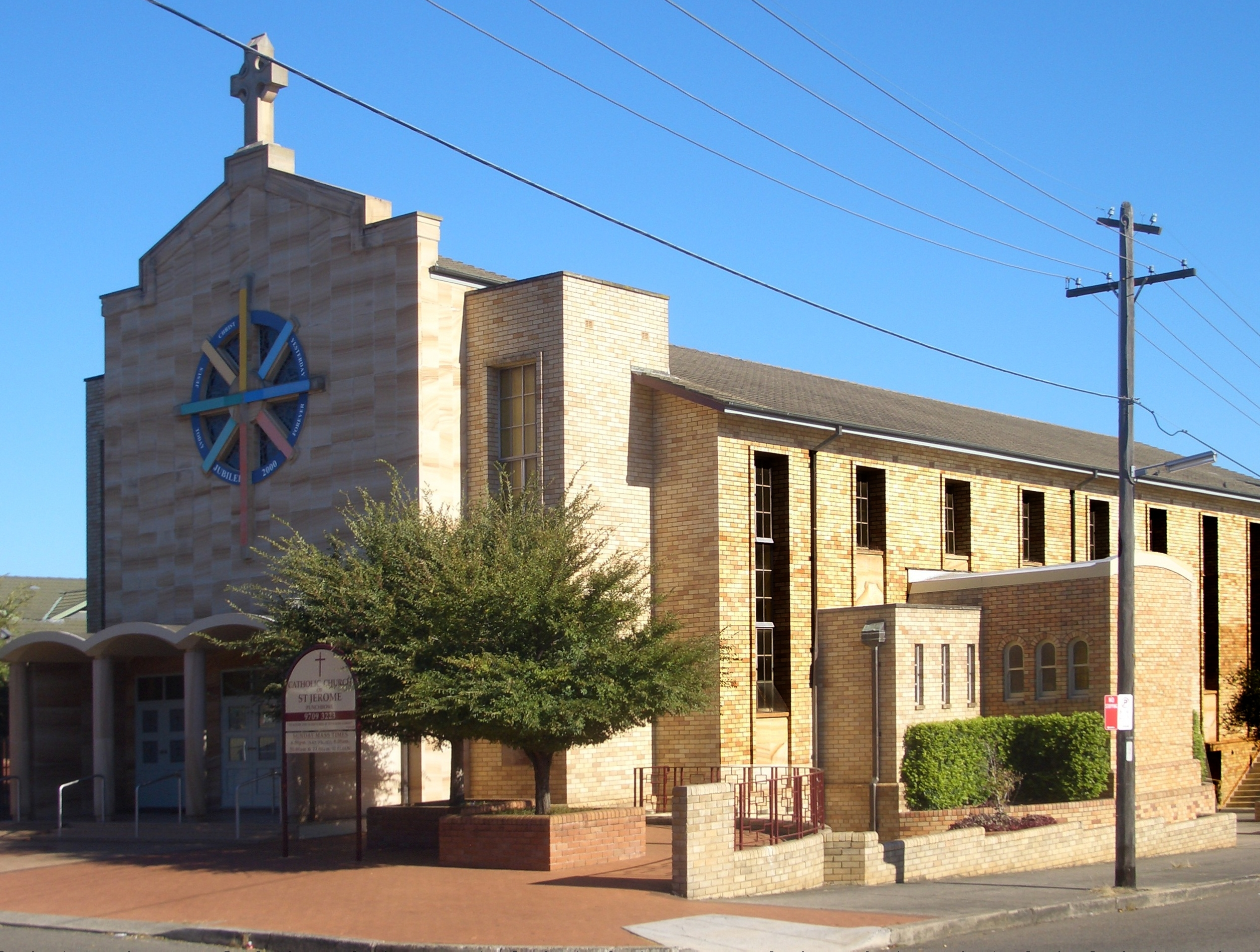
St Jerome Catholic Church

- Punchbowl Boys High School in Kelly Street, was established in 1955.
  - The school produced two Australian cricket fast bowlers, Len Pascoe and Jeff Thomson.
- Punchbowl Public School is located on Canterbury Road.
- Saint Charbel's College is located on Highclere Avenue.
- Saint Jerome's Catholic Primary School is located on Rossmore Avenue,

== Demographics ==
The first Europeans in the area were British and Irish settlers in the 19th century. By the mid-20th century, the suburb had absorbed many migrants of Italian and Greek origin. From the mid-1970s, Punchbowl became a very popular location with migrants from Lebanon.

At the 2021 census, there were 21,384 people in Punchbowl. 45.0% of people were born in Australia; The next most common other countries of birth were Lebanon 12.3%, Vietnam 5.4%, Bangladesh 3.0%, China 2.8% and Pakistan 2.7%. The most common reported ancestries were Lebanese 26.9%, Australian 12.0%, Chinese 6.8%, Vietnamese 6.8% and English 6.7%. 22.3% of people only spoke English at home; other languages spoken at home included Arabic 33.7%, Vietnamese 6.9%, Urdu 4.0%, Bengali 3.9% and Greek 3.4%. The most common responses for religion were Islam 38.4%, Catholic 22.6%, No Religion 9.6% and Eastern Orthodox 7.2%; a further 8.4% of people elected not to disclose their religion.

== Notable residents ==
- Lex Banning (1921–1965), poet
- Mark Bouris, businessman
- Geoff Epstein (born 1947), politician
- Al Lawrence (distance runner), athlete
- Akmal Saleh, comedian
- Vince Sorrenti, comedian
- Paul Zammit, politician
- The Hard-Ons, a punk rock band

=== Fictional characters ===
- Trent from Punchy

== In popular culture ==
- Punchbowl has featured in several Australian books including the satirical They're a Weird Mob by "Nino Culotta" (a nom de plume of John O'Grady), which was made into a feature film of the same name. The Mirage Hotel was referred to in the film as "the bloodhouse".
- The film The FJ Holden (1977) featured several locations in Punchbowl, including the Sundowner Hotel on the corner of Punchbowl and Canterbury Roads, a popular pub and band venue until the licence was sold. The buildings served as a Croatian Club until a new club was built.
- The television drama series Dangerous was set in and around Punchbowl.
- YouTube celebrity Trent from Punchy is a fictional character portrayed by Nicholas Boshier. The character's name is derived from his claim to be from Punchbowl.

== See also ==
- Sydney punchbowls
