= U-Go Mobility =

Australian bus company

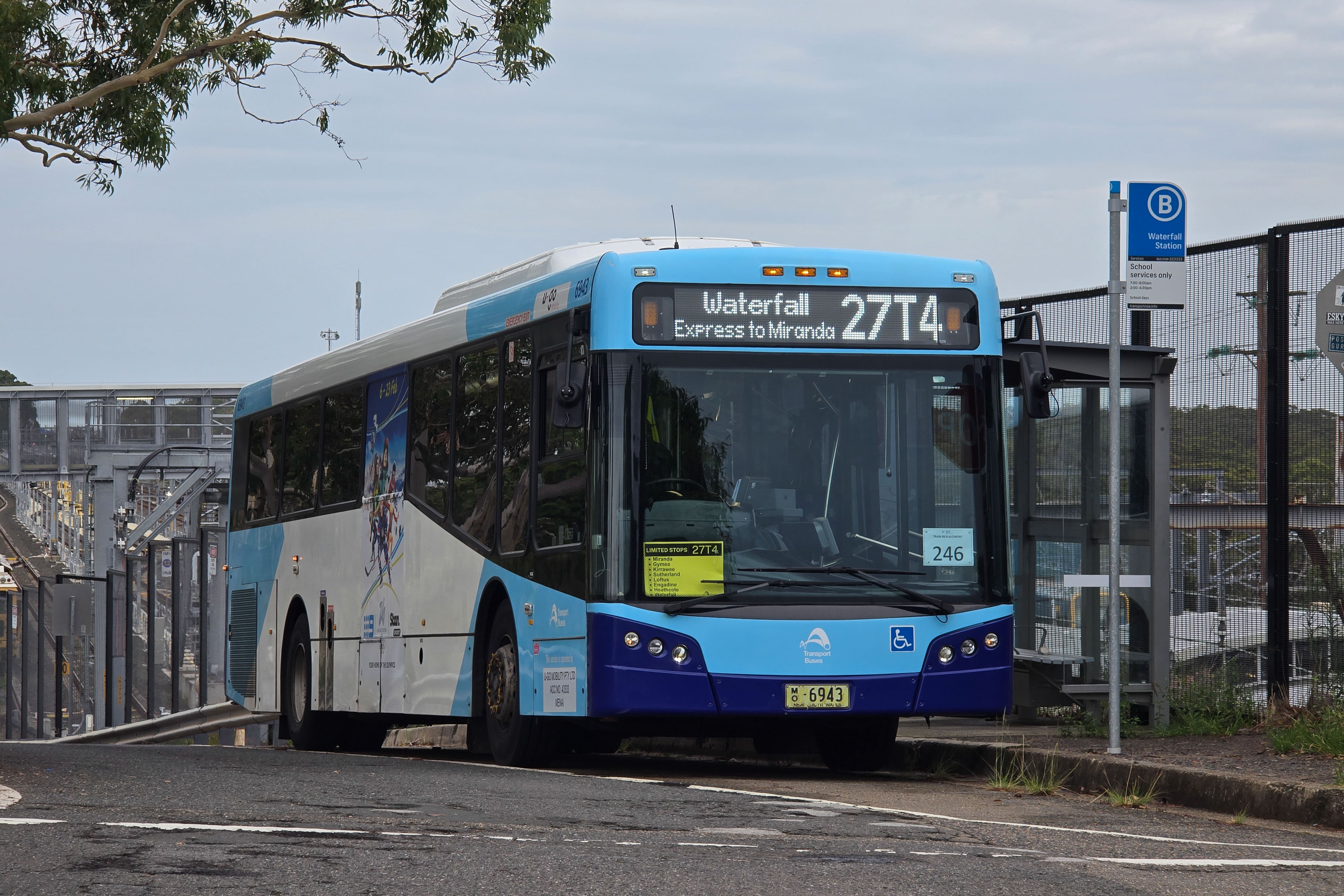
- Mercedes-Benz OC500LE Bustech VST
- Parent: UGL (50%); Go-Ahead Group (50%)
- Commenced operation: 1 July 2023; 3 years ago
- Headquarters: Sydney, Australia
- Service area: Canterbury-Bankstown; Georges River; Sutherland
- Service type: Bus operator
- Depots: 5
- Fleet: 301 (February 2026)
- Managing Director: Daniel Corbin
- Website: u-gomobility.com

U-Go Mobility is a bus company in Sydney, Australia, that operates services in Region 10, which serves South Western Sydney, and Sutherland Shire. It is a 50:50 joint venture between UGL and Go-Ahead Group.

== History ==
On 22 December 2022, U-Go Mobility was awarded a seven-year, $500 million contract to operate bus services region 10 in the Canterbury-Bankstown, Georges River and Sutherland Shire regions. The enlarged region 10 incorporates the services of region 5 formerly operated by Punchbowl Bus Company and region 10 services formerly operated by Transdev NSW. It commenced operations on 1 July 2023.

Within the first month since commencing operations, the on-time running of services was severely hampered compared to the two previous operators. When school term 3 begun on the 17 July 2023, U-Go reportedly cancelled 430 trips per weekday, including delayed school bus services. On 21 July 2023, Transport for NSW announced a deadline of 25 July for U-Go Mobility to reply to a "show cause" notice for its contract to not be torn up.

On 26 July 2023, it was also revealed that U-Go Mobility had been failing to pay staff members. According to drivers, the operator was failing to keep track of bus driver hours, including overtime. It was also stated that pay had not been correct since U-Go Mobility commenced operation.

On 28 July 2023, the NSW Government announced that Minister for Transport Jo Haylen had directed Transport for NSW to intervene and manage day-to-day operations within the region alongside U-Go Mobility, in response to poor performance from the operator. Among other responsibilities, Transport for NSW would:

- create and implement a new timetable that would be in operation by 31 July
- improve turn-around times for routes to ensure drivers are given a sufficient briefing before their trip
- meet with U-Go Mobility management to ensure that the operator was making progress on improvement and was adequately resourced.

Additionally, Transport for NSW was also directed to temporarily transfer the operation of some scheduled school services to Transit Systems to ensure those services run smoothly. Further intervention measures such as the full takeover of operations by Transport for NSW were also mooted if performance did not improve.

Passengers were notified of the timetable changes via a news item the same day on the transportnsw.info website, and trip planners were updated with the new timetable on 31 July.

On 7 August 2023, the ABC reported that the company's managing director, Matt Baynie, had departed after just one month in the position, with Haylen also confirming his departure. His replacement, Daniel Corbin, was previously head of operations at Go-Ahead Singapore. He appeared in an interview on ABC Radio Sydney on 9 August to apologise for the disruption caused to passengers, saying that the disruptions were the result of a nationwide bus driver shortage. The ABC reported that the operator needed more than 70 new bus drivers to fill shortages and the new timetable had reduced services by 12% to improve reliability and prioritise the operation of school services. Corbin said that 40 people had signed contracts and commenced training as bus drivers, and the abovementioned transfer of some school services to another operator had not yet occurred and was still being finalised. In the meantime, U-Go would continue to operate those services.

On 5 September 2023, the NSW Government announced in a media release that progress had been made on a stabilisation plan with U-Go Mobility, and that the level of service disruptions had been reduced after its intervention in late July. It also announced that:

- unplanned service cancellations were now averaging 86 per weekday, down from an average of 400 per weekday.
- resources from Transport for NSW had been dedicated to U-Go Mobility's depots to improve service reliability and prioritise important routes
- bus marshals had been deployed at interchanges in Hurstville, Bankstown, Sutherland and Miranda
- Transport for NSW was working with U-Go Mobility to ensure recruitment plans and a recruitment pipeline were implemented to help with improving the delivery of bus services
- delivery of school services and public bus routes with high student patronage were prioritised
- a new schools liaison officer was now responsible for communicating with schools and managing issues with school services
- from 17 August, the operation of 18 school services was temporarily transferred to nearby operator Transit Systems
- the delivery of NightRide services would be supported by buses from other operators where necessary
- hard copies of timetables had been provided to the offices of MPs within Region 10 to distribute to local residents who may not have had access to travel apps
- Transport Management Centre Commanders were patrolling routes to ensure service reliability a cure plan was implemented in collaboration with Transport for NSW to ensure U-Go Mobility's services recovered to required performance levels later in 2023.

On 30 September 2024, U-Go commenced operations for the Southwest Link replacement buses while the Bankstown railway line is closed for conversions to Sydney Metro with a new depot at Marrickville.

== Fleet ==
U-Go Mobility commenced operations with a fleet of 225 buses.

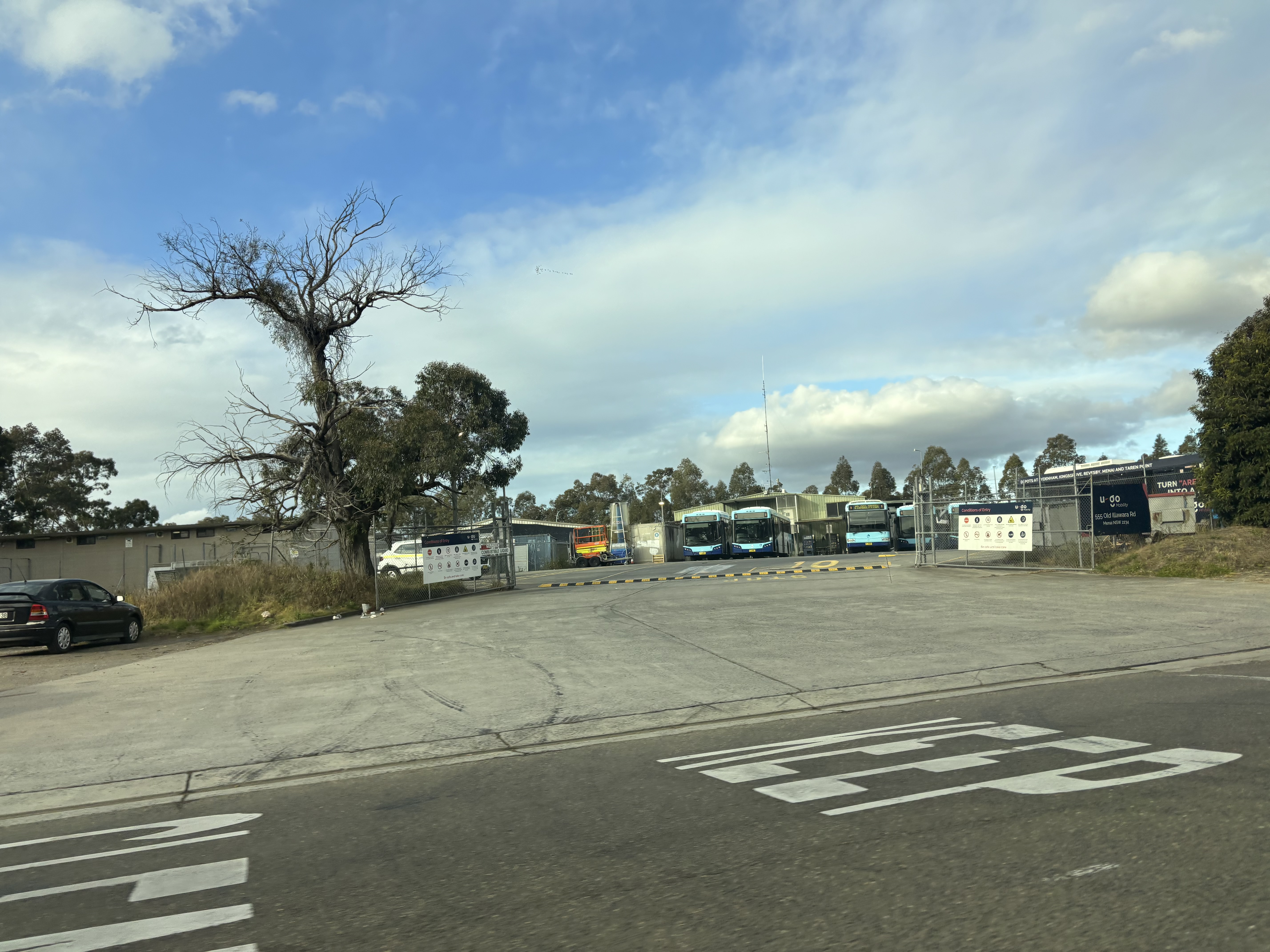
The U-go mobility bus depot at Menai

As of February 2026, it has an allocation of 301 buses, including 21 electric buses, across 5 depots – Taren Point, Menai, The Crescent (Kingsgrove), Revesby and Marrickville for the 44 Southwest Link replacement buses.

The current fleet is located below:

Chassis	Body	Picture	Year	Easy Access	Number	Notes
BCI JXK6120AG - Cat C7	BCI		28th April 2008	✓	1	ex Transdev NSW
BYD D9RA	Gemilang Eco City Bus		2021	✓	5	ex Punchbowl Bus Company
Custom Denning Element 2	Custom Denning		2024-2025	✓	32	
Volvo B12BLE Euro 3	Custom Coaches CB60		2004–2007	✓	29	ex State Transit Authority ex Keolis ex Transit Systems ex Transdev John Holland Buses
Volvo B12BLE Euro 3	Volgren CR228L		2005	✓	1	ex State Transit Authority ex Keolis
Volvo B12BLE Euro 5	Custom Coaches CB60 Evo II		2005–2007	✓	18	ex State Transit Authority ex Transit Systems ex Keolis
Volvo B12BLE	Custom Coaches CB60 Evo II		2008–2009	✓	11	ex Transdev NSW
Volvo B12BLE	Bustech VST		2004, 2007	✓	5	ex Transdev NSW ex Surfside group
Volvo B7RLE	Custom CB80		2011-2013	✓	26	ex State Transit Authority ex Keolis ex Punchbowl Bus Company ex Kinetic Group
Volvo B7RLE	Custom Coaches CB60 Evo II		2008-2011	✓	19	ex Transdev NSW ex Punchbowl Bus Company
Volvo B7RLE	Bustech VST		2013-2015	✓	13	ex Transdev NSW ex Keolis
Volvo B7RLE	Volgren CR228L		2010-2012	✓	26	ex Transdev NSW ex CDC NSW ex Punchbowl Bus Company
Volvo B8RLE	Bustech VST		2016	✓	2	ex Transdev NSW
Volvo B8RLE	Custom CB80		2018	✓	3	ex Telfords group
Scania L94UB	Bustech		2003-2004	✓	27	ex Transdev NSW
Scania L94UB	Custom Coaches CB60		2005-2006	✓	4	ex Punchbowl Bus Company
Scania K280UB	Custom CB80		2011, 2014-2016	✓	10	ex State Transit Authority ex Punchbowl Bus Company
Scania K230UB	Custom Coaches CB60 EVOii		2009	✓	6	ex Punchbowl Bus Company
Scania K320UB	Custom CB80		2017-2019	✓	16	ex Punchbowl Bus Company
Scania K320UB	Custom Endeavour		2020	✓	1	ex Punchbowl Bus Company
Scania K94IB	Custom Coaches SB400		2003-2004	✓	1	ex Transdev NSW
Man 18.280	Custom Coaches CB60		2005	✓	1	ex Transdev NSW
Mercedes Benz O405NH	Bustech		2002	✓	10	ex Transdev NSW
Mercedes Benz O405NH	Custom Coaches CB60		1999	✓	3	ex Kinetic: Used for driver training purposes
Mercedes Benz O500LE	Bustech VST		2007, 2011, 2018-2019	✓	41	ex Transdev NSW
Mercedes Benz O500LE	Volgren CR228L		2007, 2009, 2013	✓	3	ex Transdev NSW
Mercedes Benz O500LE	Custom Coaches CB60		2005	✓	1	ex Transdev NSW
Mercedes Benz O500LE	Custom CB80		2011, 2013	✓	3	ex Kinetic group

== Incidents ==
On 26 July 2023, a school bus caught fire at Menai in Sydney's south. The driver was praised for escorting more than 20 students off the bus after smelling smoke in the driver's cabin; no one was injured in the fire as a result.

On 20 March 2024, a Transit Systems bus collided with a U-Go bus at Campsie. Four people were hospitalised.
