= Wiley Park Girls High School =

Location
- The Boulevarde; Wiley Park, New South Wales; Australia; 33.9241°S 151.0669°E

Information
- Type: Public, girls, secondary school
- Motto: Do Justly Love Mercy
- Established: January 1957
- Principal: Kim Osborne
- Enrolment: 589
- Colours: Green and gold
- Website: Wiley Park Girls High School

Wiley Park Girls High School, (abbreviation WPGHS) is a public girls' government high school located in the Sydney suburb of Wiley Park, New South Wales, Australia. It is the sister school of Belmore Boys High School. Established in 1957, it is operated by the New South Wales Department of Education with girls from years 7 to 12.

== Notable alumnae ==
- Maggie Beer AM – Chef, food author, restaurateur and food manufacturer
- Irene Moss AO – Former Race Discrimination Commissioner, NSW Ombudsman and ICAC Commissioner
