= Roselands =

- Suburb
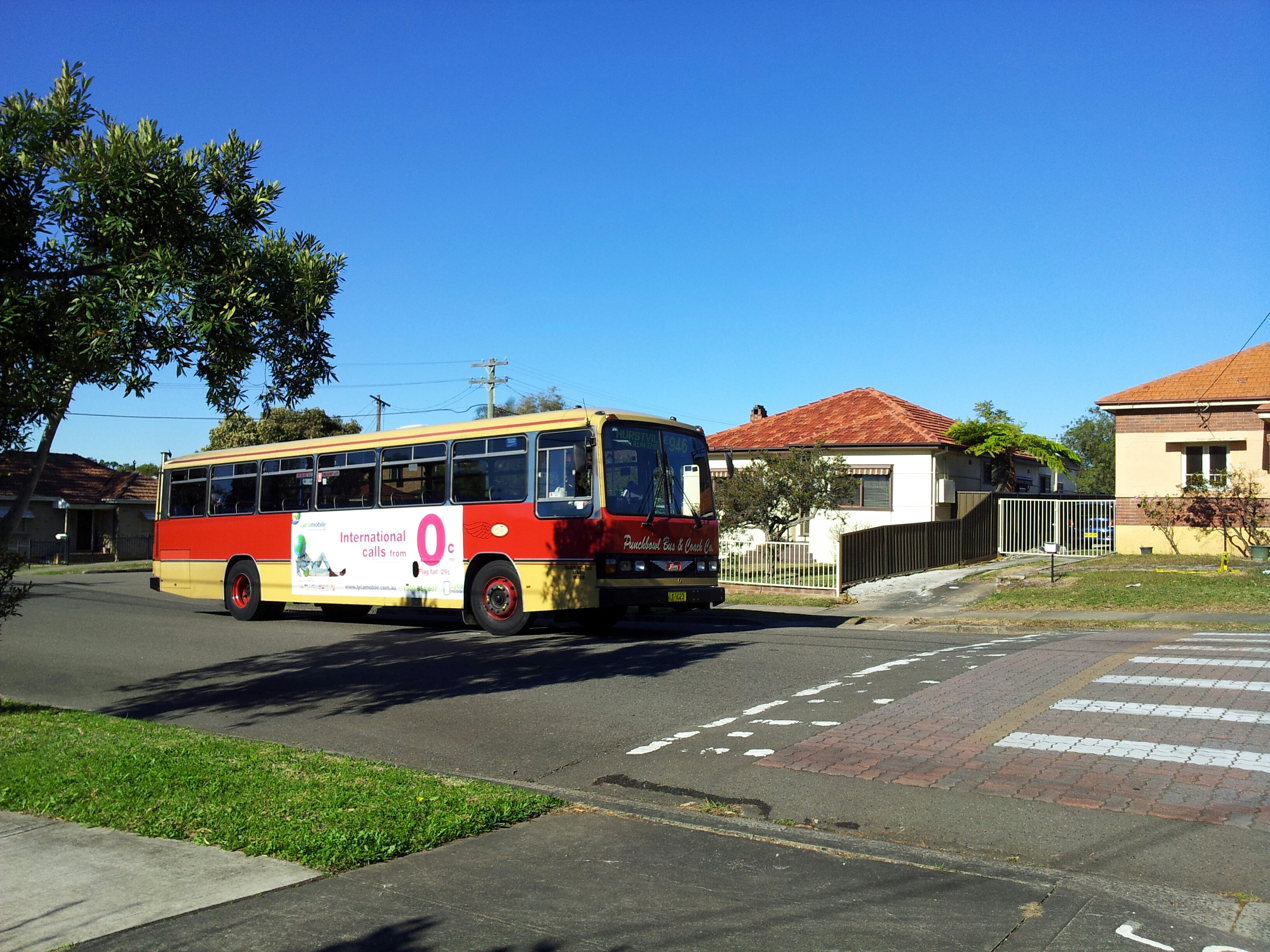
- Post-War suburban housing on Leslie Street (2012)

- Interactive map of Roselands
- Coordinates: 33°55′54″S 151°5′7″E
- Country: Australia
- State: New South Wales
- City: Sydney
- LGA: City of Canterbury-Bankstown
- Location: 16 km (9.9 mi) SW of Sydney CBD
- Established: 1987

Government
  - State electorates: Bankstown; Canterbury
  - Federal divisions: Banks; Barton
- Elevation: 58 m (190 ft)

Population
  - Total: 12,356 (2021 census)
- Postcode: 2196
Suburbs around Roselands
Wiley Park	Lakemba	Belmore
Punchbowl	Roselands	Kingsgrove
Riverwood	Narwee	Beverly Hills

Roselands is a suburb to the south-west of the Sydney CBD, in the state of New South Wales, Australia. Roselands is located 16 kilometres south-west of the Sydney central business district in the City of Canterbury-Bankstown. It is one of the easternmost suburbs in the Western Sydney area and is one of the major suburbs in Sydney without a train station.

== Geography ==
Roselands lies in the Cooks River watershed. The soil is clay, based on Wianamatta shale and is on the eastern edge of the great Cumberland Plain which extends westward to the Hawkesbury River and into the Blue Mountains. The topography is low rolling hills. Before settlement, the vegetation was open eucalypt woodland.

== History ==
=== Aboriginal ===
The first inhabitants of surrounding areas were Australian Aboriginals. At the time of British settlement in 1788 the inhabitants were of the Darug language group and they called themselves Kuri or Koori. Land grants by the new colonial government began in about 1810.

=== European ===
This area was originally part of the suburb of Punchbowl and still shares its postcode of 2196. H.R. Morgan was granted land in the area in 1842. John Fenwick bought 100 acres (0.40 km^{2}) in about 1880 from Matthew Norman in the area between Canterbury, Canarys and Bonds Roads. He built Belmore House on this land, which was demolished for the construction of Roselands Shopping Centre. The closest railway line was built to the neighbouring suburb of Belmore in 1895 and extended to Bankstown in 1909.

The suburb takes its name from the plant nursery that originally occupied the land. Later a golf course was built with same name which was taken over to build the shopping centre. It became a suburb on 9 February 1987, after some years of agitation by local residents and members of parliament.

== Commercial area ==
Roselands Shopping Centre was the third fully enclosed shopping precinct in Australia, opened in October 1965 (predated by Monaro Mall [March 1963] in Canberra and Miranda Fair [March 1964] in Sydney). Older open-air shopping precincts in Australia included Chermside Drive-in Shopping Centre (May 1957) in Brisbane, Top Ryde Drive-in Shopping Centre (November 1957) in Sydney, Chadstone Shopping Centre [October 1960] in Melbourne and Warringah Mall (April 1963) in Sydney.

Roselands was built on the site of a golf course. It boasted a large Grace Bros Department Store (now Myer), a single movie cinema, an indoor rainfall water feature (the 'raindrop fountain'), tennis courts and the first food court in Australia (Four Corners, demolished in 2000, remade as the Raindrop Food Court in December 2000). Many local bus services were diverted to service the new shopping centre upon its opening, but the centre was primarily designed for the age of the private car with plenty of parking as it was distant from any railway stations. It has since had many upgrades although it remains smaller than other Sydney shopping centres.

== Transport ==
King Georges Road is the main road through Roselands. King Georges Road also connects Roselands to the M5 South Western Motorway which links to Sydney's International Airport (15 minutes drive east) and west to Canberra and Melbourne. The nearest railway station is in neighbouring Punchbowl

== Sport and recreation ==
The Lantern Club is located in Roselands Avenue. Roselands Aquatic Centre is located in Centre Avenue, opposite the shopping centre. Roselands soccer club is located at Bennett Park.

== Demographics ==
According to the 2021 Census, 43.5% of Roselands residents stated they had been born overseas. Lebanon was the birthplace of the most foreign-born residents in Roselands at 5.4%, followed by those born in People's Republic of China at 3.8%.

In terms of ethnicity, the largest group in 2021 were those claiming Lebanese ancestry with 15.7% of the responses, followed by those claiming Greek background at 15.0%, and thirdly by those claiming Australian descent with 13.6%.

English only is the most common home language in Roselands, used by a plurality of 36.2% of residents, followed by Arabic – the home language of 16.9% – and Greek spoken by 11.9% at home.

According to the census, Christianity was the most followed faith in Roselands with 56.7% of residents reporting that they were Christian. However, Christians in the area belong to many denominations, with the largest proportions being Catholic at 23.6%, then Orthodox with 18.5%. Islam is the second largest religious group, accounting for 22.6% of residents.

== Politics ==
Roselands is in the state electorates of Bankstown and Canterbury, both of which are safe Labor seats.

== Gallery ==
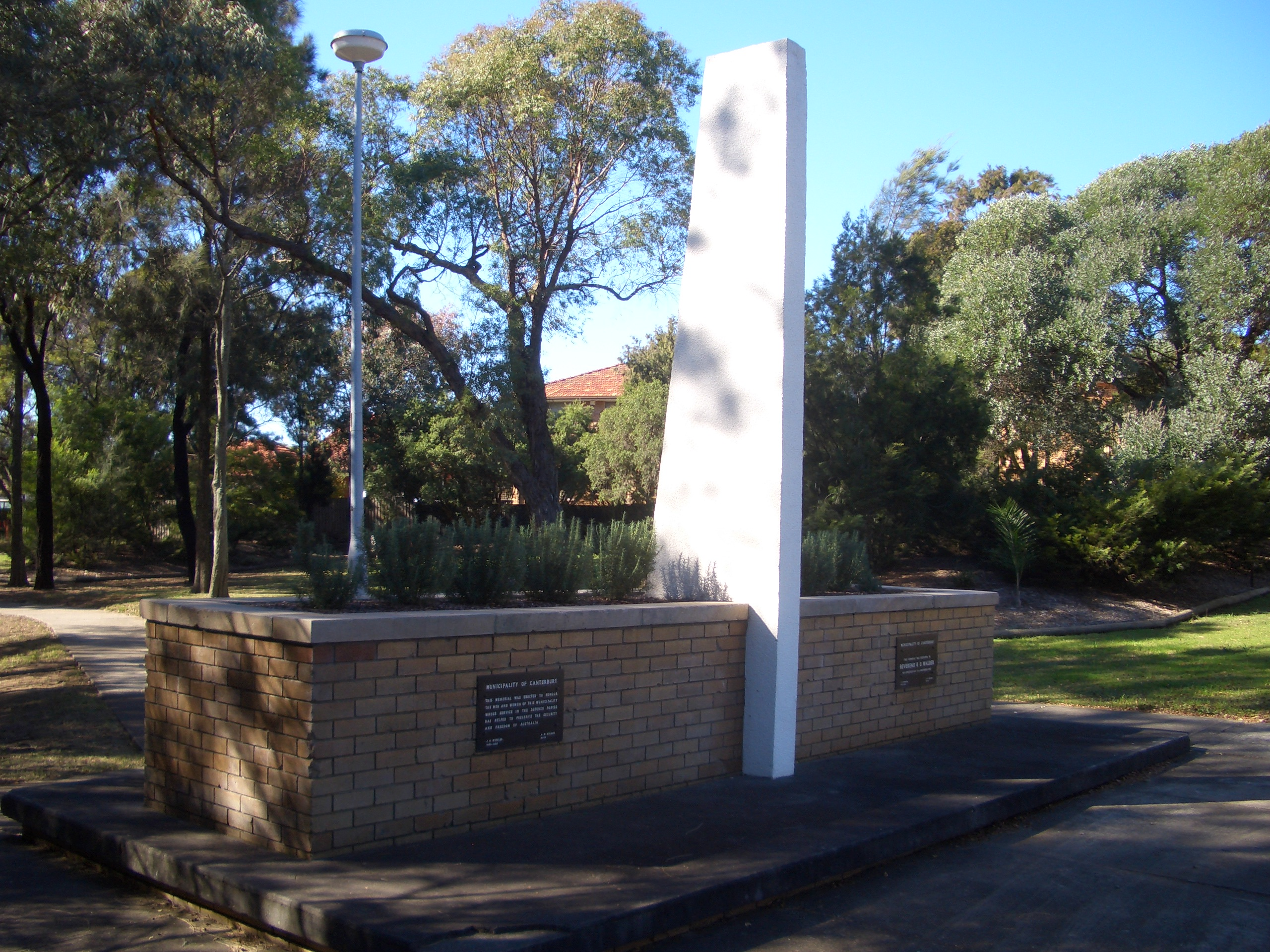
Memorial, Roselands Avenue

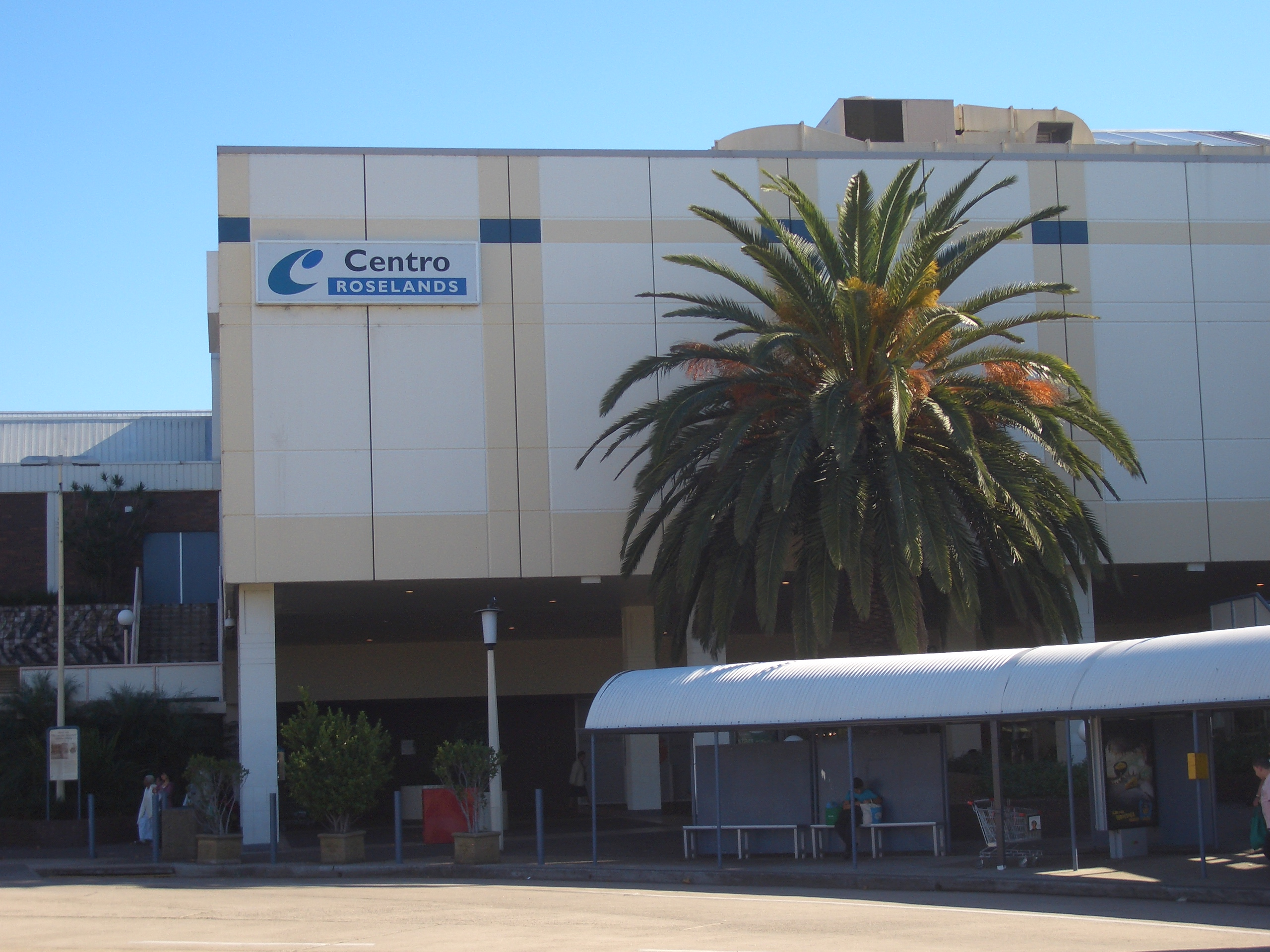
Roselands Shopping Centre

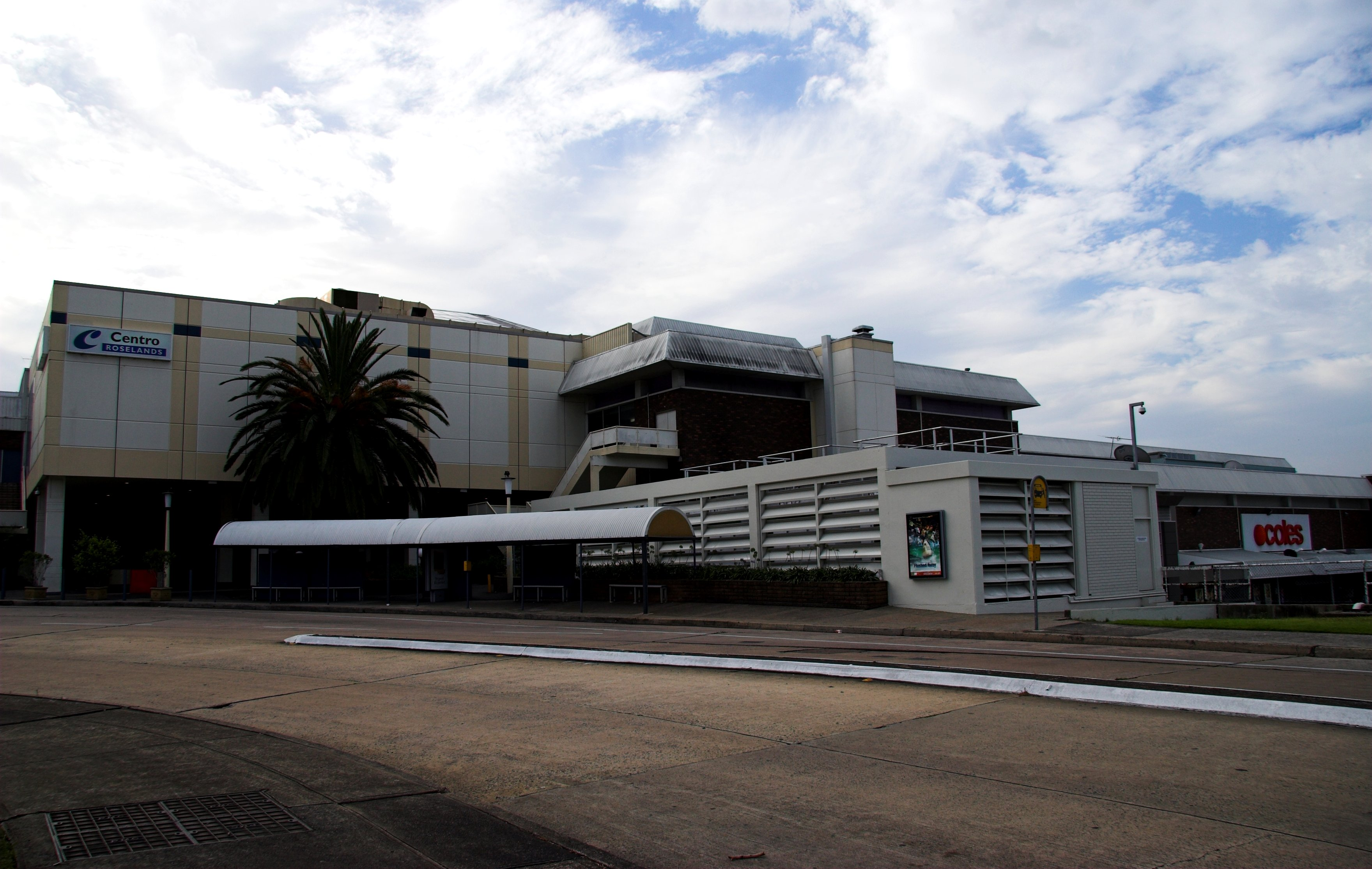
Roselands Shopping Centre

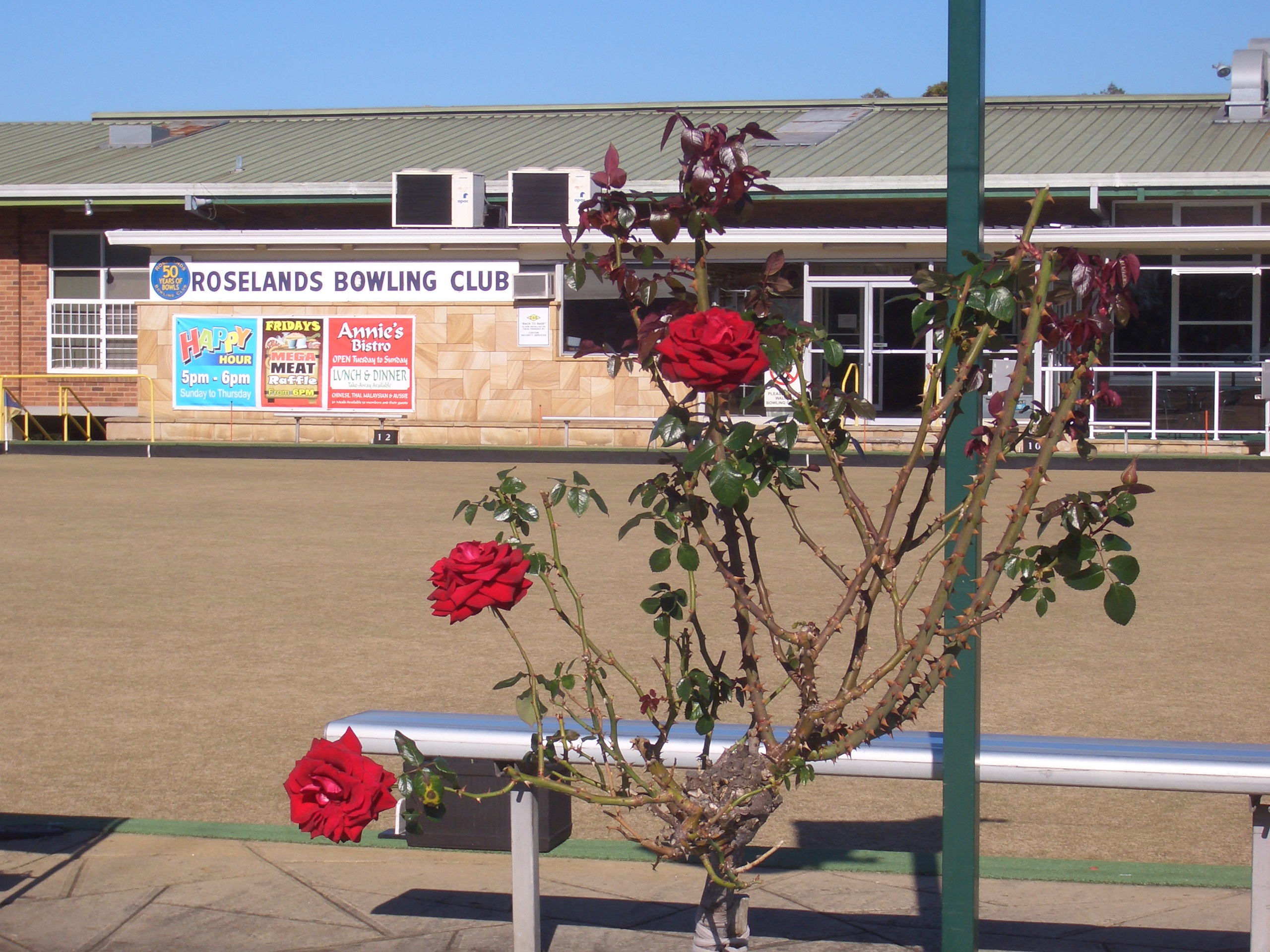
Roselands Bowling Club ((Old clubhouse demolished, replaced by Lantern Club) Poker Machine Club)

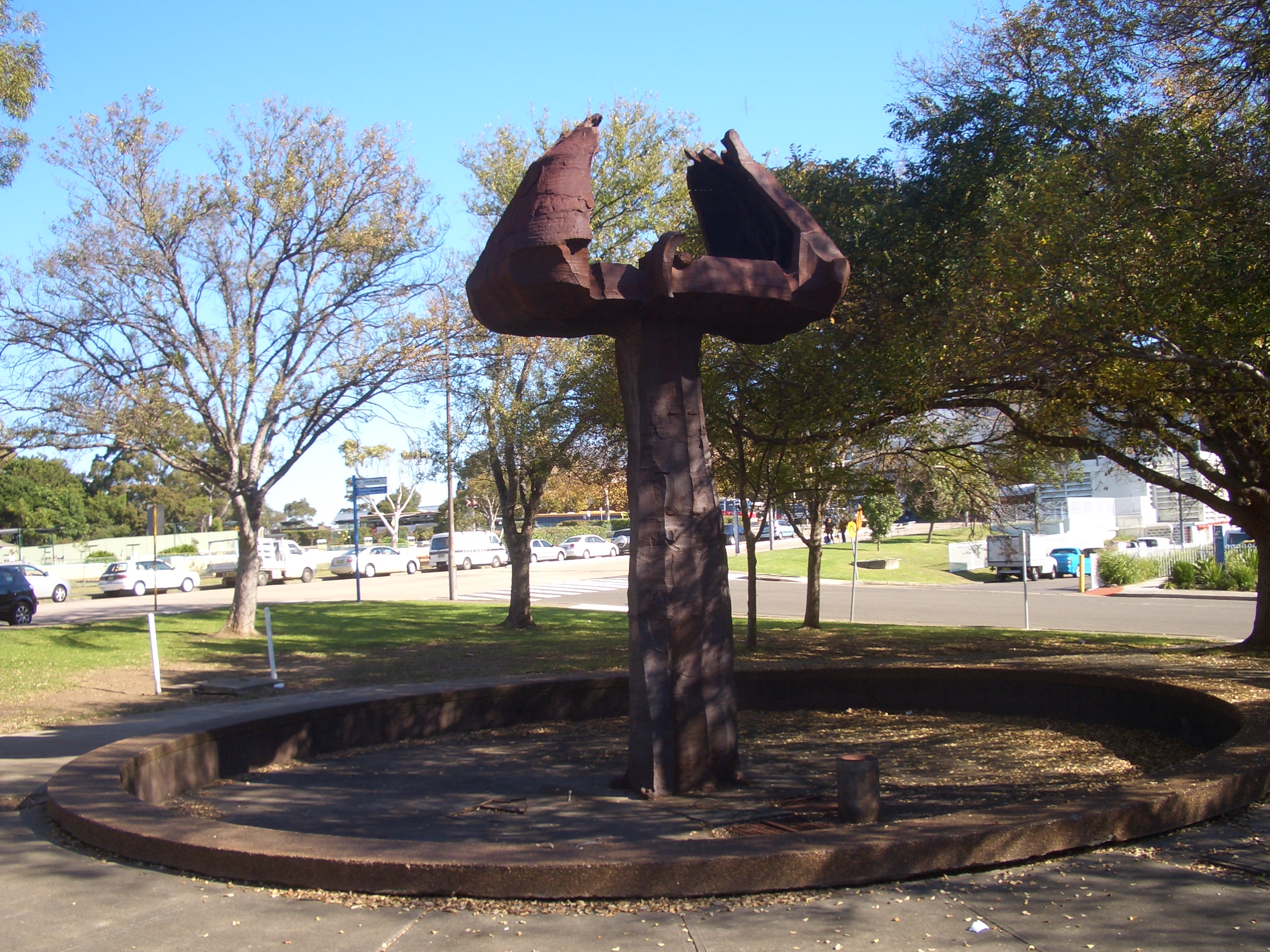
Unused Water Fountain, Roselands Avenue
