= Christiaan Van Vuuren =

Australian video blogger and actor

- Born: Christiaan Van Vuuren; 1982 (age 43–44); Caringbah, Sydney, Australia
- Known for: Acting, writing, directing, musical comedy, Soul Mates
- Relatives: Connor Van Vuuren (brother)

YouTube information
- Channel: Van Vuuren Bros
- Years active: 2009–present
- Genres: Comedy; musical; drama
- Subscribers: 129 thousand
- Views: 34.8 million
- Last updated: 23 April 2026

Christiaan Van Vuuren (born 1982), known as The Fully Sick Rapper in his first video series, is an actor, writer, director and video blogger from Sydney, Australia. He often collaborates with his brother, Connor Van Vuuren, and their YouTube channel is called Van Vuuren Bros.

== Early life ==
Van Vuuren was born in 1982 at Sutherland Hospital in Caringbah and grew up in Cronulla. His parents met in London, his father a South African and his mother a Kiwi.

== Career ==
While Van Vuuren was placed in quarantine in a Sydney hospital for tuberculosis for six months in 2010, he gained fame via videos posted under the name The Fully Sick Rapper.

He collaborated with his brother Connor Van Vuuren and Nicholas Boshier on the web series Bondi Hipsters. In 2014 and 2016, along with Connor, he co-wrote, co-directed and starred with Boshier in the ABC Television series Soul Mates.

He has featured in television programs such as Stan's The Other Guy, BBC2's STAG and Foxtel's Top of the Lake: China Girl. He directed the feature film A Sunburnt Christmas (released on Stan in time for Christmas 2020).

Van Vuuren co-wrote and presented the two-part documentary series Big Deal, which was directed by Craig Reucassel and shown on ABC Television in 2021. It examined how political donations work in Australia and their influence on democracy.

== Filmography ==
=== Film ===
Year	Title	Role
2012	Sick	Self
2012	Too Late	Director / Lead Actor
2012	Prick	Mate
2014	Emu	Dan
2016	Down Under	Doof
2017	Three Summers	Dexter
2019	The Hitchhiker	Paul

=== Television ===
Year	Title	Role	Episodes
2012	Bondi Hipsters	Writer / Director / Dom Nader	70
2012	SICK!	Chris Van Heerden	1
2012	Event Zero	Gav	1
2012	Skit Box	Director / Actor	5
2013	The Elegant Gentleman's Guide to Knife Fighting	Director / Actor	3
2013	#7DaysLater	Actor	3
2014	Soul Mates	Dom/Rocky/Roger/Dave/Director/Writer/Producer	6
2016	STAG	Christoph	1
2016	Soul Mates (series 2)	Dom/Rocky/Roger/Amram/Director/Writer/Producer	6
2017	Top of the Lake: China Girl	Stally	5
2017	The Other Guy	Dezzy	3
2018	Squinters	Director / Gav	6
2019	The Other Guy (series 2)	Dezzy	5
2019	Squinters	Director / Gav	3
2019	Over and Out	Creator / Writer / Lewis	5
2019	Location Scouts	Creator / Writer / Director	6
2023	Queen of Oz	Director / Сameo role in episode 5	6
2025	Top End Bub	Director	5 episodes
2025	Ghosts Australia	Director	

== Quarantine and The Fully Sick Rapper ==
Van Vuuren's first quarantine period began when he started coughing up blood and an x-ray revealed a hole in his lung: he was admitted to hospital on 9 December 2009 and placed in isolation on 11 December 2009. This first period of quarantine ended on 2 January 2010. Van Vuuren was re-admitted on 18 January 2010 when his tuberculosis proved resistant to medication. He was finally released from quarantine on 28 June 2010 after producing videos about his experience in isolation. His videos recorded as The Fully Sick Rapper while quarantined received over two million hits and led to the World Health Organization (WHO) contacting him to help promote World Tuberculosis Day. During his time in quarantine, Christiaan and his brother Connor developed a 60-minute telemovie titled 'SICK!' which won the One80Project and was later produced and broadcast on MTV Australia. As of April 2010, his Facebook page had attracted over 14,000 likes.

== Videos ==
As of 18 October 2019, Van Vuuren had 159 videos available on his YouTube channel. His web series Bondi Hipsters helped him reach over 31 million views. His stuntman brother helps him to write webisodes.

In 2010, he presented "Rap-Up" of the week's local news for New Zealand's Campbell Live current affairs show.

== Television ==
In 2014, Van Vuuren starred with Nicholas Boshier in the ABC Television series Soul Mates. The two had previously collaborated on the web series Bondi Hipsters. In September 2014 Van Vuuren was featured in an episode of the Australian Story documentary series.

In 2016 he appeared in the BBC2 miniseries Stag, and starred in Jane Campion's Top of the Lake: China Girl in 2017.

Van Vuuren was co-creator and co-star (with Adele Vuko) of the web series Over and Out, which won "Best Short Form Series" at CanneSeries 2019.

In 2021 he presented Big Deal, a two-part documentary series on the political lobbying industry in Australia, directed by Craig Reucassel.

== Awards and nominations ==
=== ARIA Music Awards ===
The ARIA Music Awards are a set of annual ceremonies presented by Australian Recording Industry Association (ARIA), which recognise excellence, innovation, and achievement across all genres of the music of Australia. They commenced in 1987.

Year	Nominee / work	Award	Result	Ref.
2015	"Fuhck the Bahnks" (by Bondi Hipsters)	ARIA Award for Best Comedy Release	Nominated	

== See also ==
- YouTube celebrities
