= Rostered On =

- Created by: Ryan Chamley
- Directed by: Ryan Chamley
- Starring: Nick Boshier; Doug Lyons; Tara Vagg; Diana Brumen; Susie Kazda; Jack Garnett; Stephen Francis; Lliam Murphy; Paul Moore; Ronn Kurtz Adam Balales; Steph Evison Williams; Sreed Sathiamoorthy; Luke Saliba
- Country of origin: Australia
- Original language: English
- No. of seasons: 3
- No. of episodes: 20

Production
- Executive producers: Mark Ruse, Nick Boshier, Stu Ross, Paul Moore
- Producers: Stephen Luby, Mark Ruse, Ryan Chamley, Stu Ross
- Production locations: Geelong, Victoria, Australia
- Camera setup: Single-camera
- Running time: 12-22 minutes

Original release
- Network: YouTube (2017, 2022– ) Netflix (2018 – 2022 ) 7mate (2019– )
- Release: 4 April 2016 – 18 December 2022

Rostered On is a single-camera Australian workplace comedy web series focused on the retail staff of "Electroworld". It is directed and written by Ryan Chamley and produced by Robot Army.

The series was launched with a pilot episode on 4 April 2016 and a full series began exactly a year later on 4 April 2017 airing on Facebook and YouTube. In early 2017 the show was heavily promoted including the release of an extended trailer.

Netflix picked up the series and season 1 was available from 4 April 2018. Episodes previously available on YouTube and Facebook were removed. However, the show was removed from Netflix on 12 June 2022 and all episodes were subsequently made available again on YouTube.

A second season was commissioned by the Seven Network and screened on 7mate, the first narrative comedy commissioned for the channel. Season 1 also screened on 7mate in 2019.

== Cast ==
- Paul Moore as Shaun, a salesperson at Electroworld and aspiring photographer who is constantly fed up with working a thankless job.
- Ronn Kurtz as Winston/Winno, a salesperson at Electroworld. Winston is kind-hearted, loveable and has a crush on Tess.
- Doug Lyons as Adam, Electroworld's 2IC, who is a stickler for the rules.
- Tara Vagg as Tess, the stores only Saleswoman, who has mutual feelings for Winston. Tess was played by Georgie Jennings on the Pilot Episode.
- Diana Brumen as Beeanka, one of the stores counter staff. Beeanka is mean, cold & manipulative.
- Susie Kazda as Sarah, the stores other counter staff who is good friends with Beeanka.
- Chloé Hayden as Grace, a new co-worker introduced in season 3.
- Jack Garnett as Darren, the warehouse person who keeps to himself
- Stephen Francis as Gary, the store manager. Gary is friendly, and helps out whenever he can. Good friends with Shaun.
- Lliam Murphy as Brett, one of Electroworld's top salesman. Brett is a serial womaniser, and borderline sexist. In the season 2 premiere, he comes out as bisexual.
- Adam Balales as Spencer, a salesperson who is good friends with Winston.
- Steph Evison Williams as Sara, Shaun's loving wife who works at the cafe.
- Sreed Sathiamoorthy as Vish, the resident security guard who is very confrontational, physical and has an unconventional method to dealing with customers.
- Luke Saliba as Chris Woods, one of the company's regional managers who is the stereotypical outgoing retail Manager.
- Christine Husband as Alison, one of the company's regional managers who tries to maintain order.
- Nicholas Boshier as Dan, a new staff member introduced in season 2, who is living out of his car struggling to find a place to live.
- Ace Howell as Montana, a barista at the cafe. Dan raised her as his un-biological daughter.
- Jackson Tozer as Calvin, the new security guard introduced in season 2. He is carefree and eager to hang out with his colleagues.
- Michael Mack as Clint, originally an angry customer in season 1, he returns as the head chef at the cafe in season 2.

== Reception ==
The Guardian gave it 2 stars, writing "You'd be hard-pressed to find anyone who'd consider the sleazy posturing of this Netflix relaunch good comedy" and criticized its "amateurish writing and bush-league production values".

== Episodes ==
Series	Episodes	Originally released	
Series	Episodes	First released	Last released
1	7	4 April 2016	9 May 2017
2	6	19 June 2019	31 July 2019
3	8	30 October 2022	18 December 2022

=== Season 1 (2016-2017) ===
No. overall	No. in season	Title	Directed by	Written by	Original release date
0	0	"Pilot Episode"	Ryan Chamley	Ryan Chamley	4 April 2016
1	1	"Just Turn the Dial Down"	Ryan Chamley	Ryan Chamley	4 April 2017
2	2	"The Teamwork Train"	Ryan Chamley	Ryan Chamley	11 April 2017
3	3	"Darren's Revenge"	Ryan Chamley	Ryan Chamley	17 April 2017
4	4	"The Shoplifter"	Ryan Chamley	Ryan Chamley	24 April 2017
5	5	"Stocktake"	Ryan Chamley	Ryan Chamley	2 May 2017
6	6	"The Promotion"	Ryan Chamley	Ryan Chamley	9 May 2017

=== Season 2 (2019) ===
No. overall	No. in season	Title	Directed by	Written by	Original release date
7	1	"One For Living, One For Driving"	Ryan Chamley	Ryan Chamley	19 June 2019
8	2	"I Use The Lady's, Man"	Ryan Chamley	Ryan Chamley	26 June 2019
9	3	"Diversity World"	Ryan Chamley	Ryan Chamley	3 July 2019
10	4	"Get the Tamparty Started"	Ryan Chamley	Ryan Chamley	10 July 2019
11	5	"My Whole House Smells Like Poo"	Ryan Chamley	Ryan Chamley	24 July 2019
12	6	"Hands On Heads"	Ryan Chamley	Ryan Chamley	31 July 2019

=== Season 3 (2022) ===
No. overall	No. in season	Title	Directed by	Written by	Original release date
13	1	"Internet Vs. Reality"	Ryan Chamley	Ryan Chamley & Diana Brumen	30 October 2022
14	2	"Shift Swap"	Ryan Chamley	Ryan Chamley	6 November 2022
15	3	"Diversity World"	Ryan Chamley	Lewis Mulholland	13 November 2022
16	4	"Official Compliment"	Ryan Chamley	Lewis Mulholland	20 November 2022
17	5	"The Secret Guild of Counter Girls"	Ryan Chamley	Lewis Mulholland	27 November 2022
18	6	"The Badge of Power"	Michala Banas	Ryan Chamley & Diana Brumen	4 December 2022
19	7	"The Case of the Phantom Pooper""	Ryan Chamley	Ryan Chamley	18 December 2022
20	8	"Xmas Eve vs. Boxing Day"	Michala Banas	Ryan Chamley	18 December 2022
