= Peakhurst Bus Company =

Defunct bus company in Sydney, Australia

- Bedford in Hurstville in January 1949
- Parent: Saint family
- Commenced operation: 1920
- Ceased operation: April 2003
- Headquarters: Peakhurst
- Service area: St George
- Service type: Bus services
- Routes: 3
- Hubs: Hurstville
- Depots: 1

Peakhurst Bus Company was an Australian bus and coach company in Peakhurst, New South Wales.

== History ==
The company operated under a variety of names: HT Saint, HT Saint & Sons, Peakhurst Bus Company, Peakhurst Bus & Coach Company, Lugarno Bus Company and Saints Peakhurst Coaches.

Saints operated buses in the St George region. It operated routes:

- 88 Hurstville – Bankstown via Padstow, acquired from West Bankstown Bus Service August 1964
- 108 Hurstville – Lugarno
- 113 Ramsgate – Peakhurst via Hurstville

In March 1989 routes 88 and 108 were sold to Southtrans with seven buses.

In December 1994 route 32 Kogarah to Dolls Point was purchased from Foley's Bus Service. In January 1996 routes 32 and 113 were combined as route 947 Kogarah - Dolls Point - Hurstville - Peakhurst.

With average requirements requiring a new bus to be purchased by the beginning of 1999, in December 1998 route 947 was sold. The Hurstville to Kogarah portion was sold to Southtrans and Hurstville to Peakhurst to Punchbowl Bus Company.

Saints remained as a charter operator before ceasing operations in April 2003, the three companies being liquidated in 2004.

== Fleet ==
Saints had a 49% shareholding in bodybuilder Coachmaster and from the late 1950s purchased Albion Aberdonians, Atkinson Alphas and Bedford VAM70s. In the 1980s Saints moved into coach operation with some Austral Tourmasters and a Volgren twin-deck Volvo B10M. Saints livery was white with a black waistband.

== Photographs ==
- Bus Australia by Centralian
- Pete Reid's Transport Galleries

== See also ==
- Buses in Sydney
