= Punchbowl Bus Company =

Australian bus company

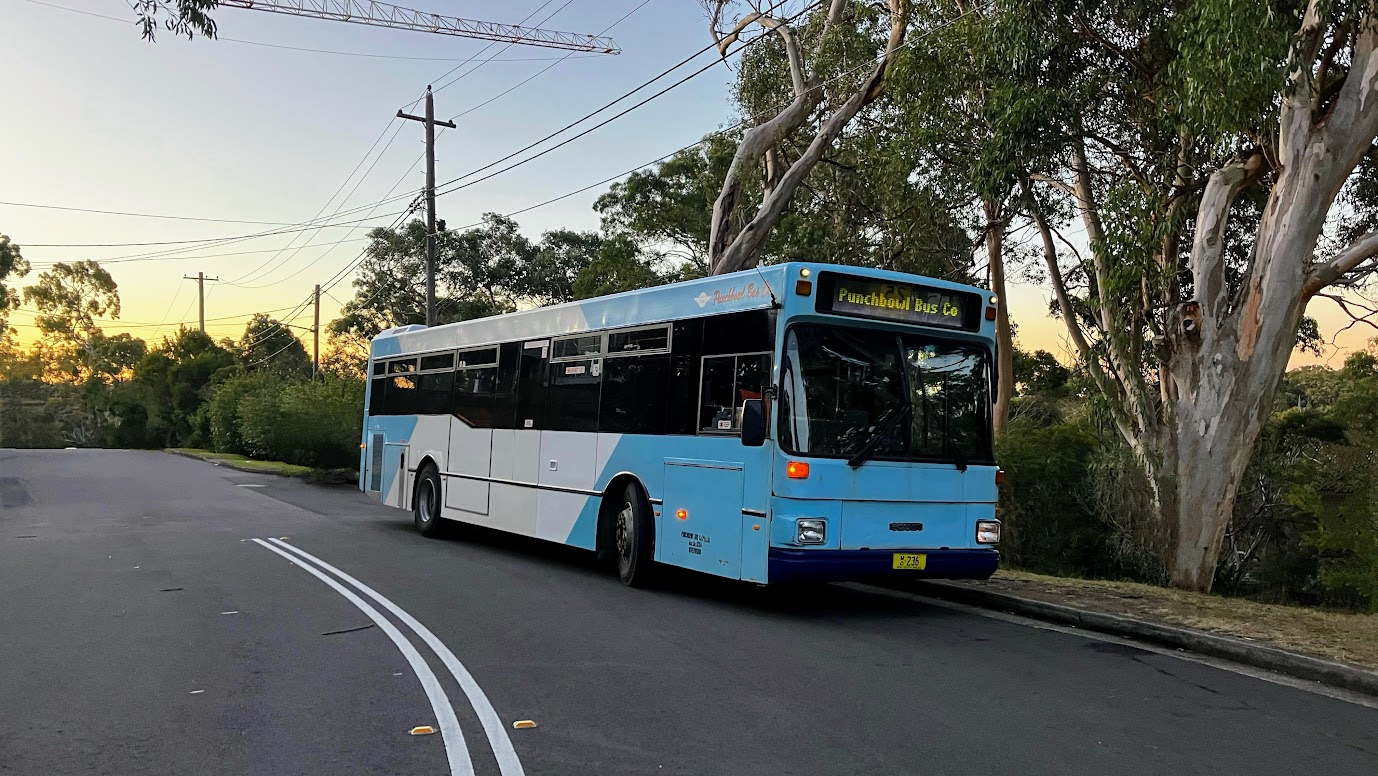
- Austral Pacific bodied Scania L113CRL at Lugarno, New South Wales in June 2023
- Parent: Steve Scott
- Commenced operation: 1952; 74 years ago
- Headquarters: Riverwood
- Service type: Bus services
- Hubs: Bankstown; Hurstville
- Depots: 2
- Fleet: 22 (November 2024)
- Website: www.punchbowlbus.com.au

Punchbowl Bus Company (PBC) is an Australian bus company. It operates bus services in Goulburn and Crookwell in the Southern Tablelands as PBC Goulburn and PBC Crookwell.

Prior to July 2023, it also operated bus services in Sydney Bus Region 5 servicing Hurstville, Roselands, Bankstown, Strathfield and surrounding suburbs. Since then, it only operates charter bus services in Sydney.

== History ==
=== Before 1960 ===
Punchbowl Bus Co (PBC) started off as DeLuxe Bus Service run by PM (Pat) Geoghegan in 1943.

- July 1943: Route 188 Punchbowl to Mortdale transferred from Boatwright.
- 29 April 1946: Route 29 Peakhurst to Hurstville commenced
- May 1946: Route 28 Punchbowl to Hurstville transferred from Leach and Mallam
- 18 August 1947: route 33 Punchbowl to Hurstville commenced and route 36 Punchbowl to Mortdale split from route 188.
- Late 1947: DeLuxe incorporated as Punchbowl Bus Co.
- 30 June 1952: Routes 28 and 33 transferred to Narwee Bus Co.
- 1956: Geoghehan died and Miss P Fitzpatrick took over.
- January or February 1957 route 140 Riverwood to Lugarno separated from route 36.
- October 1958: All routes transferred to owners of Narwee Bus Co / GP Bus Co.

GP Bus Co/Narwee Bus Co.

- Owned by WH Griffin, CV Griffin and FS (Fred) Pobje. GP are the initial of Griffin and Pobje.
- Buses owned by GP were signwritten Narwee Bus Co suggesting a close relation between these two entities.
- Believed to have started 30 June 1952 when routes 28 and 33 were transferred from PBC to one of these entities.
- 11 May 1955: Routes 4 Greenacre to Bankstown, 189 Punchbowl to Bankstown and 190 Greenacre to Punchbowl were transferred from XL Transport to GP Bus Co.
- October 1958: Owners of Narwee Bus Co / GP Bus Co took over PBC adopting the Punchbowl Bus Co name and livery for the full operation but using the Narwee Bus Co depot. However between 1958 and 1992 various timetables were still issued in the Narwee/GP names.

=== Since 1960 ===
By 1961, weekday routes 4 and 190 were combined to operate as route 4 between Bankstown and Punchbowl. Sunday route 190 trips between Punchbowl and Rookwood Cemetery finished up either at Easter or Anzac Day 1961.

In 1967, routes 4 and 28 were combined into route 244, operating between Bankstown and Hurstville via Chullora, Greenacre, Punchbowl and Roselands to give residents in the Greenacre/Chullora area direct access to the new Roselands Shopping Centre. Later when Punchbowl Bus Company took over route 37 Punchbowl to Bankstown, this route was integrated with route 33 Punchbowl to Hurstville to operate between Bankstown and Hurstville via Punchbowl and Roselands. During the late 1960s route 189 was extended from Punchbowl to Roselands, Riverwood and Lugarno replacing route 140, which initially operated between Riverwood and Lugarno. In January 1992, Revesby Bus & Coach Service's route 26 was replaced by an extension of route 188 from Punchbowl to Bankstown, and route 36 was amended to travel along the route of 26 at the Punchbowl end. In 1989 route 108 was purchased from Southtrans.

In August 1997, the routes were renumbered into the Sydney wide scheme, including minor changes to routes. The new routes were:

- 940 replacing 29 and 33
- 941 replacing 244
- 942 replacing 189
- 943 replacing 29 and 108
- 944 replacing 29 and 36
- 945 replacing 188

In April 1998, Punchbowl Bus Co purchased Canterbury Bus Lines with routes 450 Hurstville to Strathfield and 451 Roselands - Campsie. Route 451 was extended to Hurstville later that year when part of route 947 was acquired from Saints creating a direct service from Hurstville to Campsie. The remainder of route 947 to Ramsgate was taken over by Southtrans.

In December 2004, route 74/106 Hurstville to Kyle Bay and Connells Point was taken over from Harris Park Transport (renumbered 953) and 954 Hurstville to Hurstville Grove and Oatley from Moore's Tours. In July 2005 routes 446 Roselands Shopping Centre to Kogarah and 447 Belmore to Greenacre were taken over from Pleasure Tours.

In March 2010, Punchbowl Bus Company implemented another route numbering reconfiguration as part of the integrated transport network planning process. This was done in order to provide more frequent and direct services. As a result, routes 447 and 451 were discontinued and many of the other routes modified. Several new routes were established, including the 939, 946 and 955. Punchbowl Bus Company also introduced the S14, a new service between Lakemba and Mount Lewis.

Network changes from 26 November 2017 saw route 944 truncated to run between Bankstown and Mortdale, as well as route 450 now only running between Strathfield and Hurstville and route 946 now only running between Bankstown and Roselands. On 1 March 2018, Nightride service N20 was extended to continue into Town Hall via Sydney Airport instead of terminating at Rockdale.

Punchbowl Bus Company used to operate services in Sydney Bus Region 5 servicing Hurstville, Roselands, Bankstown, Strathfield and surrounding suburbs. In August 2013, Punchbowl successfully tendered to operate Region 5 for another five years from July 2014. In December 2022, it was announced that Punchbowl Bus Company was unsuccessful in retaining its existing region 5 bus operations. On 1 July 2023, these operations were transferred to U-Go Mobility. As of September 2024, the company continues to operate charter services in Sydney.

== Operations ==
The company operations are divided into three brands:

- Punchbowl Bus Company – for Sydney services
- PBC Goulburn
- PBC Crookwell

Between 2005 and 2023, Punchbowl's services formed Sydney Bus Region 5. These route operations were transferred to U-Go Mobility on 1 July 2023. As of September 2024, the company continues to operate charter services in Sydney. This includes the Baylink shuttle services at Sydney Olympic Park, Wentworth Point and Rhodes areas.

Punchbowl for many years also operated a coach charter operation in Sydney. This had ceased by 2012 but still carries on with local charters using existing city buses in the fleet.

In November 2008, Punchbowl purchased Goulburn Bus Service using the name PBC Goulburn followed in October 2009 by neighbouring Noack's Bus Service. The runs of Crookwell Bus Service were taken over on 20 November 2017, using the name PBC Crookwell.

== Depots ==
Punchbowl Bus Company previously had two depots. The main depot located at 56 Hannans Road, Riverwood, was the original depot of the Narwee Bus Company and is still operating as of September 2024. A secondary depot operated from 187–189 Bonds Road, Riverwood, which has closed after the transfer of operations to U-Go Mobility in July 2023.

The former secondary depot was located at 60 Belmore Road, Punchbowl and closed when the new Bonds Road depot opened. The Hannans Road depot can fit around 50–52 vehicles and the Bonds Road depot can fit around 23–25 vehicles at maximum capacity.

== Fleet ==
As of July 2022, the fleet consisted of 74 buses. After the transfer of buses and services to U-Go Mobility in July 2023, as of November 2024, the fleet consisted of 22 buses.

Until the late 1980s, Punchbowl Bus Company were a loyal Leyland buyer. Following their withdrawal from the market, Hino, MAN, Scania and Volvos have been purchased.

Punchbowl Bus Company operated Denning and later Mercedes-Benz and MAN coaches in its charter division.

From its foundation in 1952, the fleet livery was red and cream. In 2010, the Transport for NSW white and blue livery began to be applied on the Sydney bus fleet. There is only one bus on route service which still wears the Punchbowl Bus Co. livery, m/o 809. All other vehicles in the Punchbowl Bus Co. livery are now used on charter work, train replacement etc. PBC Goulburn and PBC Crookwell fleet continues to bear the Punchbowl Bus Co. livery.

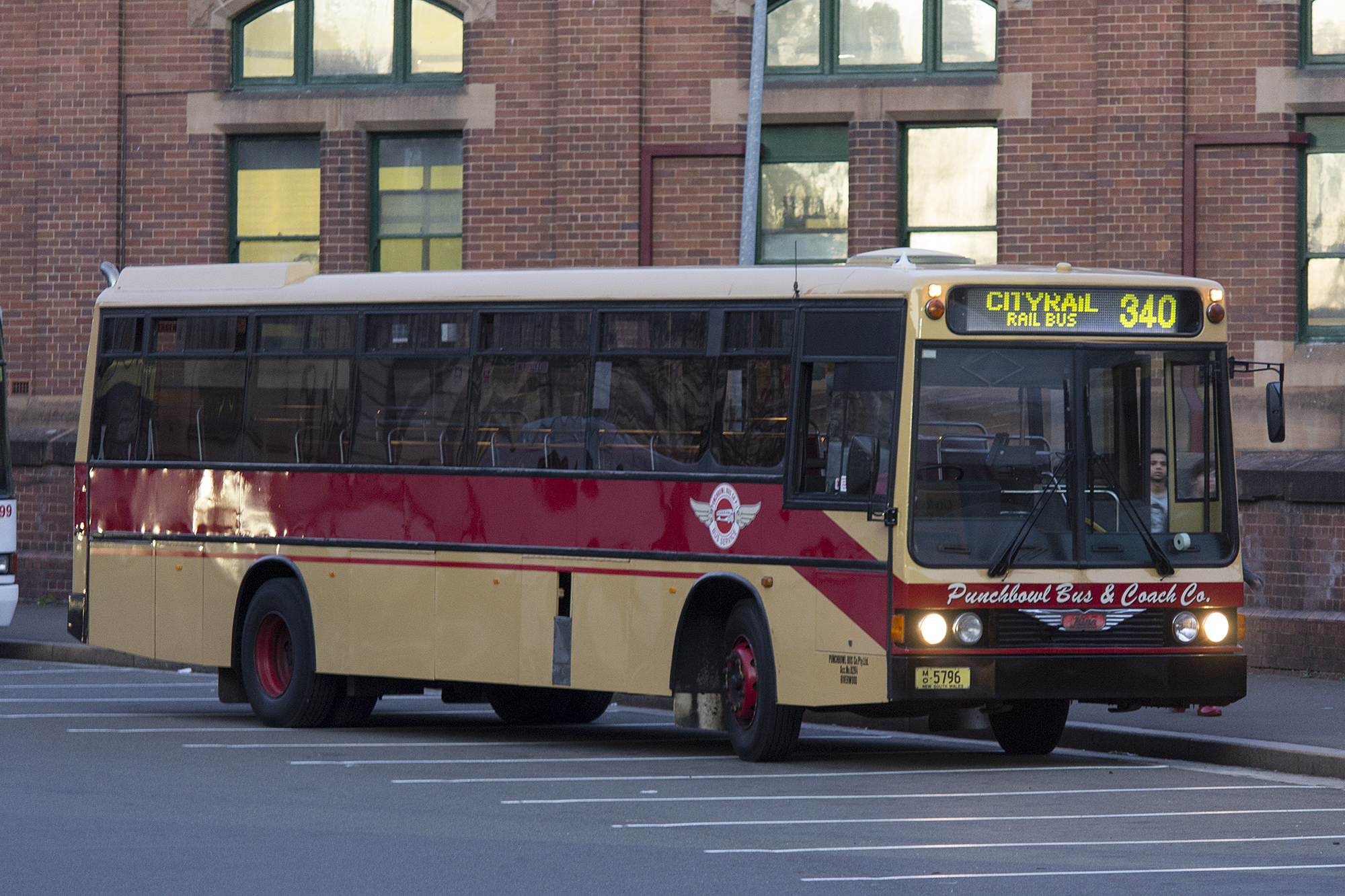
PMCA bodied Hino RM197K in PBC livery

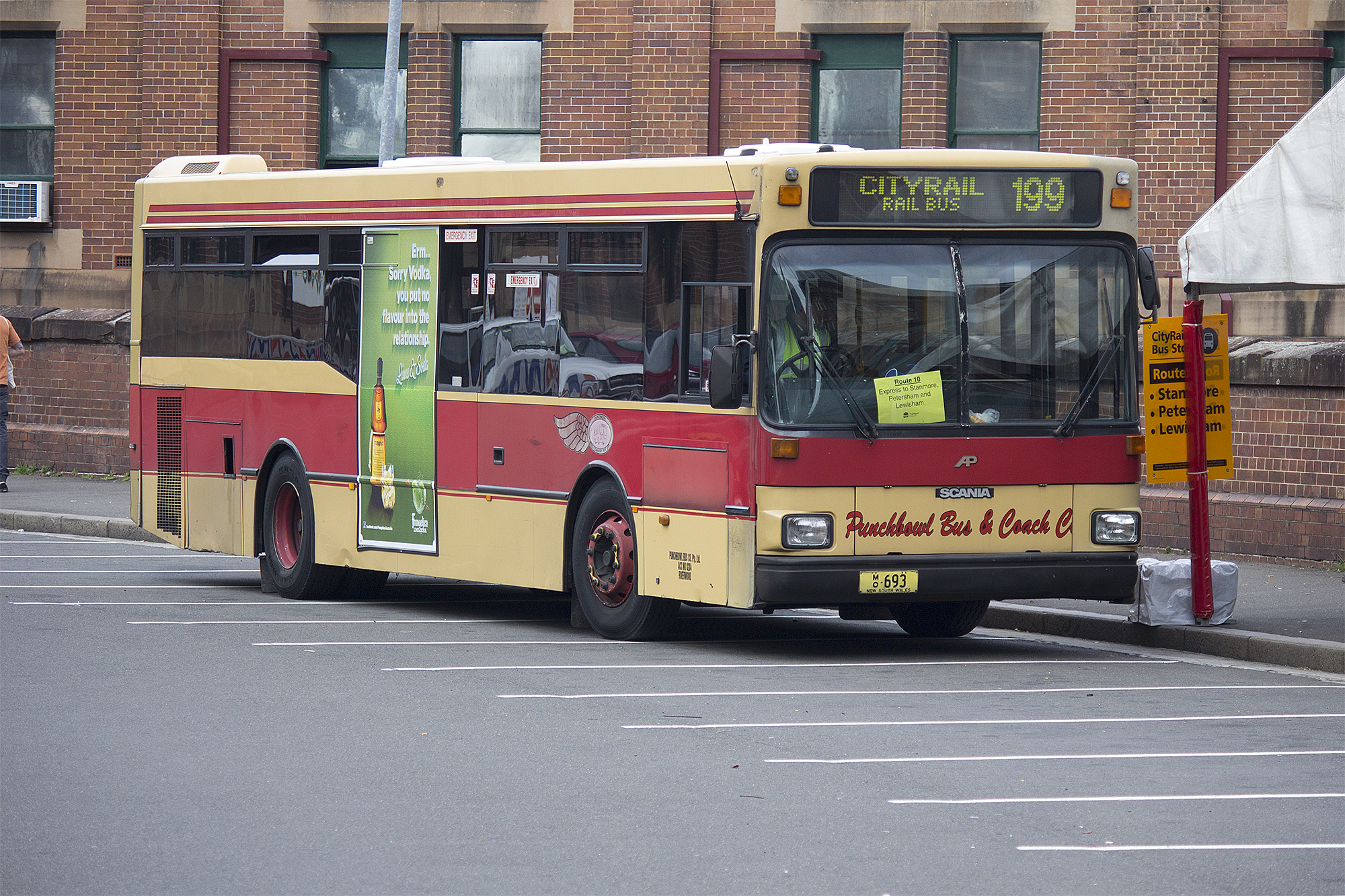
Austral Pacific bodied Scania L113CRL in PBC livery

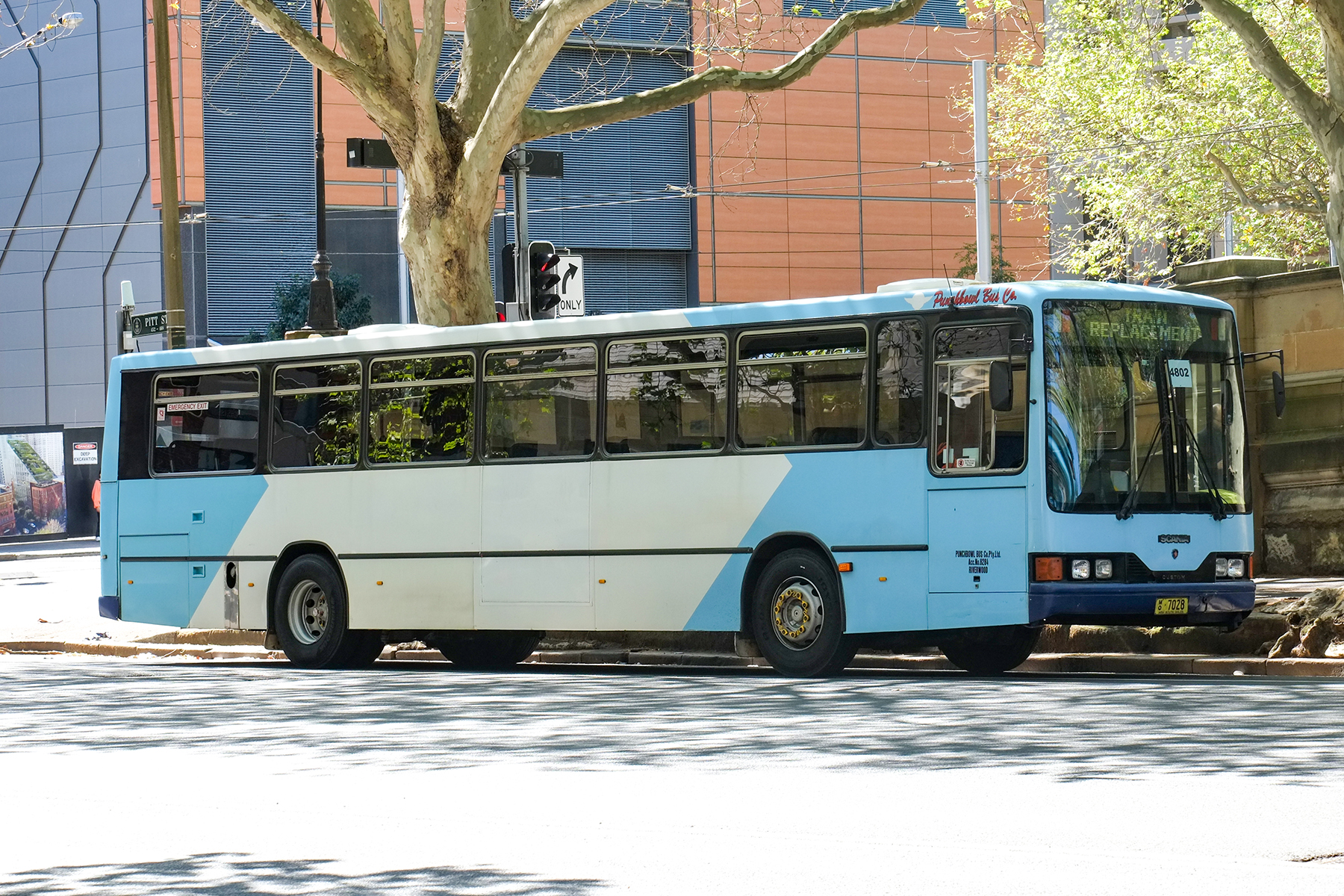
Custom Coaches bodied Scania L94IB in TfNSW livery

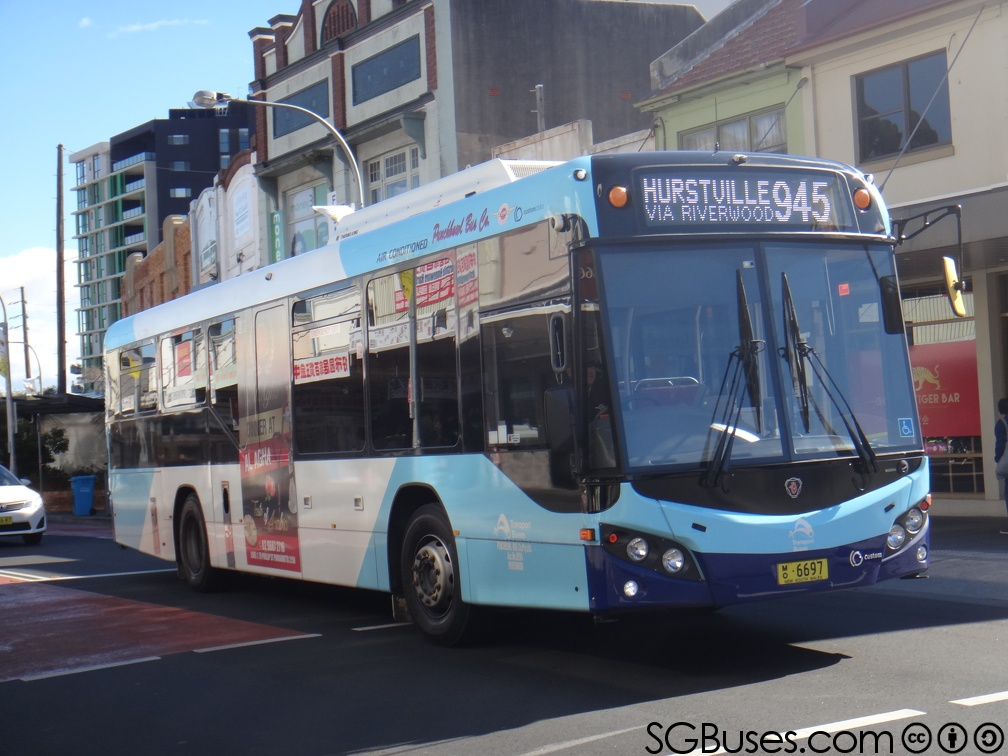
Custom Coaches bodied Scania K320UB in TfNSW livery

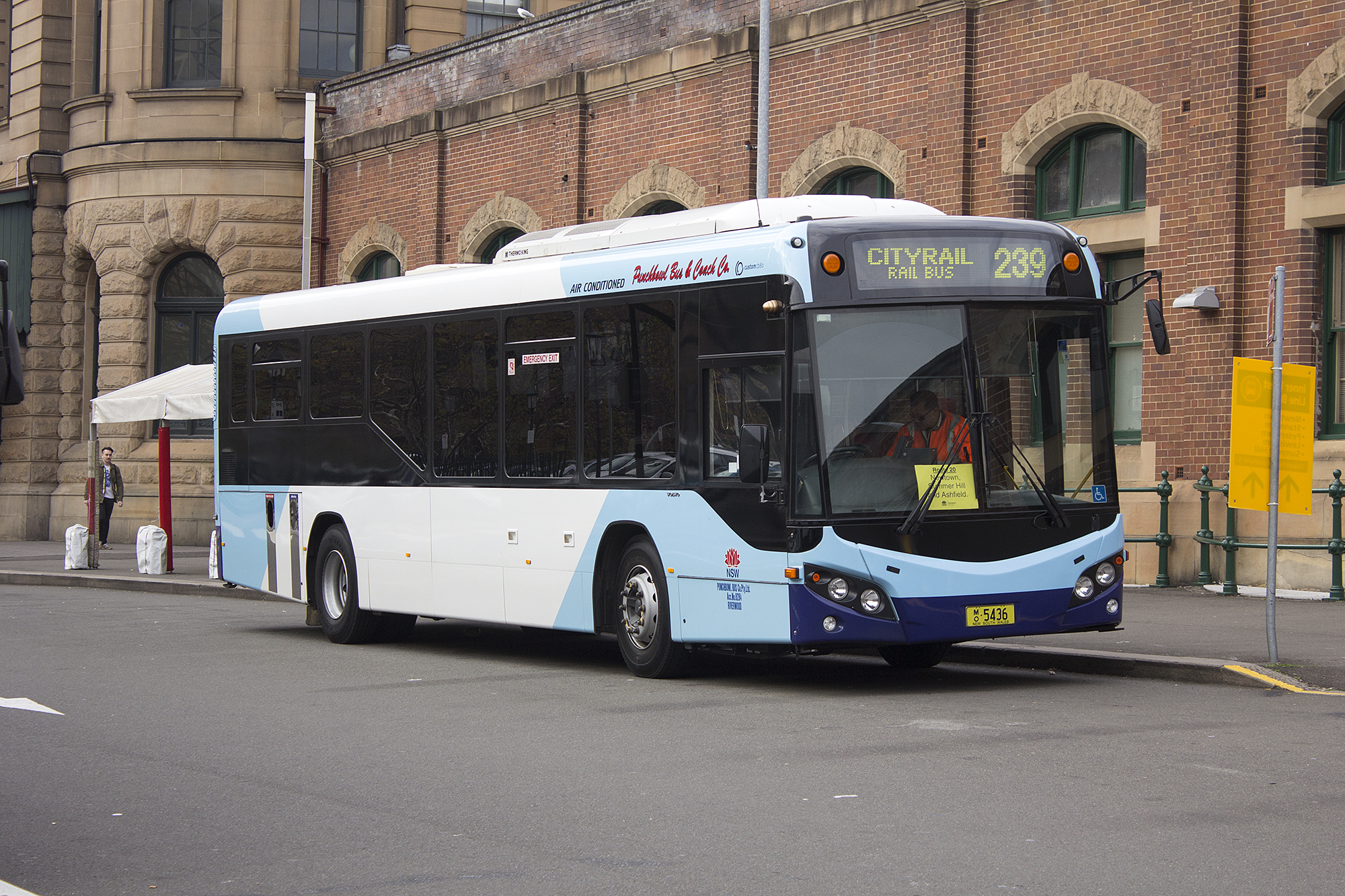
Custom Coaches bodied Volvo B7RLE at Central station in July 2013

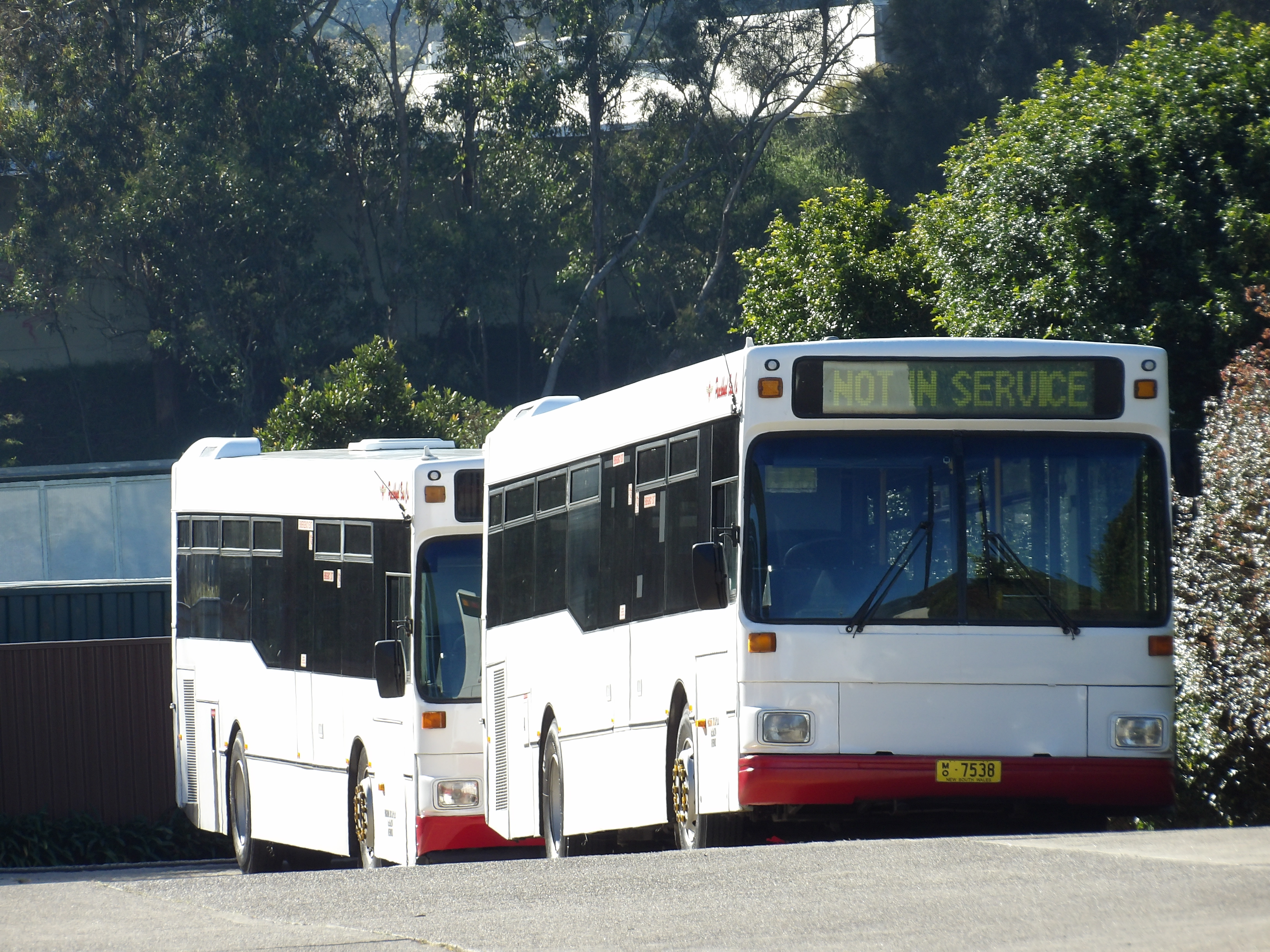
Scania L113CRL Austral Pacific MO 7538 in PBC white livery

== Ticketing ==
Since 16 July 2014, all buses used for Sydney services have been equipped to accept the Opal card ticketing system.
