= Foley's Bus Service =

- Parent: Foley family
- Commenced operation: 1947
- Ceased operation: December 1994
- Service area: St George
- Service type: Bus
- Depots: Kogarah

Foley's Bus Service was an Australian bus company operating route bus services on Sydney's St George area.

== History ==
Foley's Bus Service was formed in 1947, when John Foley purchased route 32 Kogarah station to Ramsgate from Reo Motors in exchange for his operation in Orange. In the 1960s, Foley's diversified into coach operations, this part of the business was sold in 1984 to Chester Coaches with eight coaches. John's son Paul (died 2014) subsequently took over the business. In 1952 the roof was ripped from a double-decker bus that he was driving when it passed under a low railway bridge.

In 1994, the business was sold to Peakhurst Coaches.

== Depot ==
The depot was located at 159 President Avenue, Kogarah.
