= Trent from Punchy =

- Trent as seen in the original YouTube video
- Created by: Anthony MacFarlane; Nicholas Boshier
- Portrayed by: Nicholas Boshier

In-universe information
- Nationality: Australian

Trent from Punchy is a fictional YouTube celebrity. Trent first appeared in a YouTube video entitled Trent from Punchy, in a reference to the Western Sydney suburb of Punchbowl on 1 February 2008. The video purported Trent to be a real character, who was found by filmmakers at Punchbowl railway station and offered $20 in order to be interviewed on camera. Trent's antics and language gained notoriety, enabling the video to become a viral sensation.

The video was later revealed to have been staged, with Trent found to be fictional character portrayed by actor and comedian Nicholas Boshier, though additional videos starring Boshier in character as Trent have since been made. In 2011, the character appeared in a promotional skit for the television series Housos.

== Original video ==
The video begins with text on the screen stating that the interview is with an actual kid "found at punchbowl train station" who was paid $20 for the interview. The interview, which makes frequent use of jump cuts, then begins with Trent talking about various topics including his birth, recreational drug use, Punchbowl, his 'best mate' Kev, how "so many birds" are after him and his mother who is a sex worker. Trent is seen wearing a collared shirt and shorts, and sports a mullet haircut. Trent was noted for his catchlines which included "just fuckin' relax, ay!" and outrageous comments, including "girls are bitches, they're like stitches, you pull them out and then they open up."

== Reaction ==
Trent's antics and language in the original video helped it become a viral sensation, and the character of Trent gathered a cult following. The video had over 2 million views by May 2009. Capitalising on the video's success, the filmmakers created a store selling merchandise related to the character, which sold over $1000 worth of products in its first week, and also created a website for users to post 'sightings' of Trent. As well as claimed sighting of Trent, numerous fan videos, unauthorised remixes and dubious interviews with Trent's best friend Kev were released by various people on YouTube. These responses have been credited as an example of a "de facto viral marketing campaign", generating additional attention for the original video. A second official interview with Trent was released in September 2008.

The video created "countless" debates over whether the character of Trent was genuine or an actor. In September 2008 The Australian reported the video was the work of Anthony MacFarlane, a filmmaker and director of a production company whose clients included the Liberal Party and Qantas. Macfarlane insisted the character was real, stating he spotted Trent when he and friends were "out and about in Punchbowl". After filming the video he stated he sent it to a few friends before posting it on YouTube. The article speculated, however, that Trent was really actor Nicholas Boshier. This theory was later confirmed. Boshier received a considerable amount of fame after he was revealed to be Trent. In 2009, Macfarlane and Boshier worked together creating the cartoon Beached Az.

In September 2011, Trent was featured in a promotional skit for the comedy television series Housos. The skit was also featured on the Housos series 1 DVD. After a five-year hiatus, seven official Trent from Punchy short videos were released on YouTube in 2013, and another three were released in 2019. As of March 2021, the original YouTube video had 9.4 million views.
