= The Wiley Park Singers =

Australian children's choir

The Wiley Park Singers are an Australian children’s choir, formed in the south-west of Sydney in 1995. The choir is based in Wiley Park, Sydney, and composed of children from 29 cultural backgrounds. They have been variously trained by music educators Lynne Woods, Vanessa Witton, Michael Strahan and Jack Liston.

The Wiley Park Singers were the first public school choir in Australia to record their own music CD. They first came to prominence when the gospel song "Oh Happy Day" from their debut album The Wiley Park Singers! Volume 1 was played on Australian radio in 1999. The album was championed by ABC Radio’s Richard Glover and 2UE’s Alan Jones at a time when the south-western suburbs of Sydney were receiving negative media attention in the wake of the Lakemba shootings.

Two further self-titled albums were recorded by the singers, the third funded by a member of the Australian public. Martin Cilia of Australian surf instrumental band The Atlantics contributed guitar to both.

In 2003 The Wiley Park Singers entered the ABC Sydney Christmas CD competition with a modern rendition of "Silent Night" and were selected to be included on the 2004 ABC Christmas compilation album.

== Discography ==
- The Wiley Park Singers! Vol. 1 (1999) – produced by Lynne Woods, Vanessa Witton, Jeff Cripps.
- The Wiley Park Singers! Vol. 2 (2000) - produced by Lynne Woods and Vanessa Witton.
- The Wiley Park Singers! Vol. 3 (2002) - produced by Lynne Woods, Michael Strahan, Jeff Cripps.
