= Nicholas Boshier =

Australian actor

Nicholas Boshier is an Australian actor. Boshier gained fame after he was revealed to be the actor portraying YouTube celebrity Trent from Punchy, a character whom the film's director Anthony MacFarlane had previously lied about and insisted was genuine. Boshier went on to develop the cartoon Beached Az along with Macfarlane and Jarod Green, with Boshier voicing the main character of the whale. In 2014 he starred alongside Christiaan Van Vuuren in the series Soul Mates; Boshier and Van Vuuren had previously collaborated on the web series Bondi Hipsters.

== Selected filmography ==
Television

Year	Title	Role	Notes
2009	Beached Az	Whale (voice)	21 episodes
2010	Radiradirah	As himself	3 episodes
2012	The Strange Calls	Doug	1 episode
2014–2016	Soul Mates	Adrian Archer / Sticks / Roboss / Terry Thinge / Seti	12 episodes
2019	Rostered On	Dan	6 episodes
2020	Retrograde	Dylan	5 episodes
2020	Dom and Adrian: 2020	Adrian Archer	Special on Stan
2025	Spaced Az	Whaleborg	26 episodes

== Awards and nominations ==
=== ARIA Music Awards ===
The ARIA Music Awards are a set of annual ceremonies presented by Australian Recording Industry Association (ARIA), which recognise excellence, innovation, and achievement across all genres of the music of Australia. They commenced in 1987.

Year	Nominee / work	Award	Result	Ref.
2015	"Fuhck the Bahnks" (by Bondi Hipsters)	ARIA Award for Best Comedy Release	Nominated	
