= Beached Az =

- Genre: Comedy
- Created by: Jarod Green, Nick Boshier, Anthony MacFarlane
- Voices of: Anthony MacFarlane, Nick Boshier, Jarod Green, India Patten, Archie Greig-Lawson, Bravo Child
- Theme music composer: Jarod Green
- Country of origin: Australia
- Original language: English
- No. of seasons: 2
- No. of episodes: 21

Production
- Executive producer: The Handsomity Institute
- Running time: 1–2 mins

Original release
- Network: ABC2
- Release: 10 September 2009 – 11 August 2010

Beached Az is an animated cartoon series broadcast by the Australian Broadcasting Corporation (ABC). It is shown on both ABC1 and ABC2.

== Concept ==
Beached Az follows the struggle of a whale beached on a New Zealand beach to get back into the ocean. During his time on the beach, the whale encounters a variety of sea life who discuss their various problems and ambitions. Each episode uniquely lacks any formal narrative arc, and the series is more a collection of comedic conversations highlighting social differences.

== History ==
Beached Az is a continuation of the characters developed in the short film titled "Beached Whale" which was created in April 2008. The short film was animated/directed by Jarod Green and written/directed by Anthony MacFarlane and Nick Boshier.

Appearing primarily on YouTube, the film gained widespread popularity in Australia and New Zealand through social media channels. In 2009, the same creators came together to write, direct and animate ten more episodes for ABC Television under the banner of their newly founded company The Handsomity Institute.

Writing for the series took place at Seal Rocks on the NSW coast whilst final recording took place in June at the ABC studios in Ultimo.

On 13 September 2009 the series debuted online one week before broadcast on ABC2. On 3 June 2010, season 2 premiered.

On 4 November 2010 Beached Az was launched into DVD format available nationally.

== DVD release ==
The complete "Beached Az" collection was released nationally on 4 November 2010. The DVD includes all 21 episodes from season one and two of the cartoon plus exclusive never before seen footage from the creators.

The DVD also includes pilot episodes of the 'failed Scottish children's TV show' "Breakfast with Bergerk".

== Episodes ==
=== Season 1: 2009 ===
| No. overall | No. in series | Title | Directed by | Written by | Original release date |
|---|---|---|---|---|---|
| 1 | 1 | "The Seagull" | Jarod Green, Anthony MacFarlane, Nick Boshier | Anthony MacFarlane, Nick Boshier | 10 September 2009 |
The first of the episodes, originally created as a standalone animation, follows the story of a blue whale that wakes up on a New Zealand beach. After a seagull approaches the whale, they have a conversation about chips, a play on the difference between the Australian and the New Zealand pronunciations of the word "chips", which includes the fact that the whale can't chew. The seagull then wanders off to find a bucket or a hose to help the whale because he is "beached as".
| 2 | 2 | "The Snail" | Jarod Green, Anthony MacFarlane, Nick Boshier | Jarod Green, Anthony MacFarlane, Nick Boshier | 17 September 2009 |
Awoken by something tickling him, the whale meets an overly excited and constantly amazed snail who is leaving the sea in fear of salt.
| 3 | 3 | "The Baby Whale" | Jarod Green, Anthony MacFarlane, Nick Boshier | Jarod Green, Anthony MacFarlane, Nick Boshier | 24 September 2009 |
The seagull and the whale are confused when a baby whale intentionally swims ashore to avoid getting his skin wrinkly.
| 4 | 4 | "The Squid" | Jarod Green, Anthony MacFarlane, Nick Boshier | Jarod Green, Anthony MacFarlane, Nick Boshier | 1 October 2009 |
The seagull finds a bucket for the whale but discovers a squid, who inhabits it and appears extremely relaxed about being bait.
| 5 | 5 | "The Stingray" | Jarod Green, Anthony MacFarlane, Nick Boshier | Jarod Green, Anthony MacFarlane, Nick Boshier | 8 October 2009 |
The whale tries to convince a really sad (or possibly dead) stingray to talk about his emotions by singing a song with the seagull.
| 6 | 6 | "The Duck" | Jarod Green, Anthony MacFarlane, Nick Boshier | Jarod Green, Anthony MacFarlane, Nick Boshier | 15 October 2009 |
A duck takes some ducklings for an excursion but ends up in the trap of a fire breathing dragon.
| 7 | 7 | "The Turtle" | Jarod Green, Anthony MacFarlane, Nick Boshier | Jarod Green, Anthony MacFarlane, Nick Boshier | 22 October 2009 |
The whale comes across a turtle who is in a hurry to bury her eggs before disaster strikes.
| 8 | 8 | "The Bluebottle" | Jarod Green, Anthony MacFarlane, Nick Boshier | Jarod Green, Anthony MacFarlane, Nick Boshier | 29 October 2009 |
The whale and the seagull think a bluebottle is deaf when it refuses to chat with them.
| 9 | 9 | "The Starfish" | Jarod Green, Anthony MacFarlane, Nick Boshier | Jarod Green, Anthony MacFarlane, Nick Boshier | 5 November 2009 |
The whale and the seagull mistake a disabled starfish for a tasty snack.
| 10 | 10 | "The Crab" | Jarod Green, Anthony MacFarlane, Nick Boshier | Jarod Green, Anthony MacFarlane, Nick Boshier | 12 November 2009 |
The whale is amazed by the size of the crab's giant claw, which turns out to be a sensitive topic.
| 11 | 11 | "The Rope" | Jarod Green, Anthony MacFarlane, Nick Boshier | Jarod Green, Anthony MacFarlane, Nick Boshier | 19 November 2009 |
The characters come up with a plan to get the whale "de-beached".

=== Season 2: 2010 ===
| No. overall | No. in series | Title | Directed by | Written by | Original release date |
|---|---|---|---|---|---|
| 12 | 1 | "The Koala Bears" | Jarod Green, Anthony MacFarlane, Nick Boshier | Jarod Green, Anthony MacFarlane, Nick Boshier | 3 June 2010 |
The whale meets several koalas. Although koalas are not bears, only they can call themselves bears. They also find the quote "I'm Beached As!" funny.
| 13 | 2 | "The Pelican" | Jarod Green, Anthony MacFarlane, Nick Boshier | Jarod Green, Anthony MacFarlane, Nick Boshier | 10 June 2010 |
A pelican, who loves drama and painting, meets the whale.
| 14 | 3 | "The Goats" | Jarod Green, Anthony MacFarlane, Nick Boshier | Jarod Green, Anthony MacFarlane, Nick Boshier | 24 June 2010 |
A pair of misguided goats discuss the medical implications of being "beached az".
| 15 | 4 | "The Walrus" | Jarod Green, Anthony MacFarlane, Nick Boshier | Jarod Green, Anthony MacFarlane, Nick Boshier | 1 July 2010 |
A thumbless walrus turns to his best mate, a coconut, to finally get the whale off the beach.
| 16 | 5 | "The Barnacles" | Jarod Green, Anthony MacFarlane, Nick Boshier | Jarod Green, Anthony MacFarlane, Nick Boshier | 8 July 2010 |
A community of seafaring barnacles take drastic action after realising they are not made for life on the beach.
| 17 | 6 | "The Dragon" | Jarod Green, Anthony MacFarlane, Nick Boshier | Jarod Green, Anthony MacFarlane, Nick Boshier | 14 July 2010 |
The Duck and the Whale try to rebuild the deteriorating relationship of the Crab and his girlfriend
| 18 | 7 | "The Sea Slug" | Jarod Green, Anthony MacFarlane, Nick Boshier | Jarod Green, Anthony MacFarlane, Nick Boshier | 21 July 2010 |
A nudity-embracing Sea Slug teaches an embarrassed Whale and Sea Snail how to manage their self-consciousness.
| 19 | 8 | "The Clams" | Jarod Green, Anthony MacFarlane, Nick Boshier | Jarod Green, Anthony MacFarlane, Nick Boshier | 28 July 2010 |
Two blind Clams with an identity crisis (and plenty of rhythm) are spooked by anything that talks to them.
| 20 | 9 | "The Hermit Crab" | Jarod Green, Anthony MacFarlane, Nick Boshier | Jarod Green, Anthony MacFarlane, Nick Boshier | 4 August 2010 |
A thrifty Hermit Crab discovers a unique home opportunity with amazing ocean views.
| 21 | 10 | "The Tide" | Jarod Green, Anthony MacFarlane, Nick Boshier | Jarod Green, Anthony MacFarlane, Nick Boshier | 11 August 2010 |
Is this it? The tide is coming in, but can the Whale be convinced to stay Beached Az by his friends?

=== Season 3: 2019 ===
On 11 December 2018, Production House Robot Army Productions put up a video on Youtube announcing the "new home" of Beached Az, along with new episodes commissioned by The Government of Australia and Screen Australia. The planned release date for this new season was March, 2019. As in previous seasons, the humour is both comic and confrontational with episodes set to tackle issues such as coral bleaching, reverse racism, the impact of plastic and fishing on the ocean environment, genetic diversity of fish in fish farms, global warming, sexism, drug cartels and corporate deforestation.
