= Wiley Park railway station =

Railway station in Sydney, New South Wales, Australia

Wiley Park
- Northbound view, November 2026

General information
- Location: King Georges Road, Wiley Park; Australia
- Coordinates: 33°55′23″S 151°04′02″E
- Owner: Transport Asset Manager of New South Wales
- Operator: Sydney Trains (until 30 September 2024); Metro Trains Sydney (from 2026)
- Line: Metro North West & Bankstown Line
- Distance: 15.35 kilometres (9.54 mi) from Central
- Platforms: 2 side
- Tracks: 2
- Connections: Bus

Construction
- Structure type: Ground
- Accessible: Yes

Other information
- Status: Weekdays: Staffed: 6am to 7pm: Weekends and public holidays: Staffed: 8am to 4pm
- Station code: WLP
- Website: Transport for NSW

History
- Opened: 19 June 1938
- Closed: 30 September 2024
- Rebuilt: 30 October 2026

Passengers
- 2023: 733,880 (year); 2,011 (daily) (Sydney Trains, NSW TrainLink)

Services
Preceding station	Sydney Metro	Following station
Punchbowl towards Bankstown	M1 Metro North West & Bankstown Line	Lakemba towards Tallawong
Former services
Preceding station	Sydney Trains	Following station
Punchbowl towards Lidcombe or Liverpool	Bankstown Line (until 2024)	Lakemba towards City Circle
Location

Wiley Park railway station is a heritage-listed railway station on the Metro North West & Bankstown Line in the Sydney suburb of Wiley Park.

== History ==
Wiley Park station opened on 19 June 1938, well after the line from Belmore to Bankstown opened in 1909, to provide an interchange with King Georges Road. While adjacent stations have island platforms, this station was built with side platforms and the architecture of the station buildings is significantly different.

The station received lifts and additional canopies as well as a new building on Platform 1 in 2023, in preparation for conversion to Sydney Metro.

The station closed on 30 September 2024 to facilitate the conversion of the Bankstown line to Sydney Metro. It reopened on 30 October 2026.

== Platforms and services ==
Platform	Line	Stopping pattern	Notes
1	M1 Metro North West & Bankstown Line	services to Tallawong	
2	M1 Metro North West & Bankstown Line	services to Bankstown	

== Transport links ==
U-Go Mobility operates two bus routes via Wiley Park station, under contract to Transport for NSW:

- 942: Campsie to Lugarno
- S14: Lakemba to Mount Lewis

Wiley Park station is served by one NightRide route:

- N40: East Hills station to Town Hall station
