= Lakemba =

Lakemba is the name of two places, and the Sydney one was directly named after the Fijian one.

- Lakemba, New South Wales is a suburb in the south-west of Sydney.
  - Lakemba Mosque is in the suburb and is one of the largest mosques in Australia
  - Lakemba railway station serves the suburb
  - The Electoral district of Lakemba is based around the suburb in Sydney
- Lakeba, originally spelt Lakemba, is an island in the Lau Group of Islands in the Eastern Division of Fiji.
