= Punchbowl railway station =

Railway station in Sydney, New South Wales, Australia

Punchbowl
- Southbound view of the station entrance, November 2026

General information
- Location: Punchbowl Road, Punchbowl; Australia
- Coordinates: 33°55′31″S 151°03′20″E
- Elevation: 39 metres (128 ft)
- Owner: Transport Asset Manager of New South Wales
- Operator: Sydney Trains (until 30 September 2024); Metro Trains Sydney (from 2026)
- Line: Metro North West & Bankstown Line
- Distance: 16.45 kilometres (10.22 mi) from Central
- Platforms: 2 (1 island)
- Tracks: 2
- Connections: Bus

Construction
- Structure type: Ground
- Accessible: Yes

Other information
- Status: Weekdays: Staffed: 6am to 7pm: Weekends and public holidays: Staffed: 8am to 4pm
- Station code: PCB
- Website: Transport for NSW

History
- Opened: 14 April 1909
- Closed: 30 September 2024
- Rebuilt: 30 October 2026

Passengers
- 2023: 1,092,020 (year); 2,992 (daily) (Sydney Trains, NSW TrainLink)

Services
Preceding station	Sydney Metro	Following station
Bankstown Terminus	M1 Metro North West & Bankstown Line	Wiley Park towards Tallawong
Former services
Preceding station	Sydney Trains	Following station
Bankstown towards Lidcombe or Liverpool	Bankstown Line (until 2024)	Wiley Park towards City Circle
Location

Punchbowl railway station is a heritage-listed railway station located on the Metro North West & Bankstown Line in the Sydney suburb of Punchbowl.

== History ==
Punchbowl station opened on 14 April 1909, when the Bankstown line was extended from Belmore to Bankstown.

Until it closed in the early 1990s, the Punchbowl Maintenance Depot lay to the north-west of the station.

As part of the conversion to Sydney Metro, the station received an accessibility upgrade and a lift in 2023.

The station closed on 30 September 2024 to facilitate the conversion of the Bankstown line to Sydney Metro. It reopened on 30 October 2026.

== Platforms and services ==
Platform	Line	Stopping pattern	Notes
1	M1 Metro North West & Bankstown Line	services to Tallawong	
2	M1 Metro North West & Bankstown Line	services to Bankstown	
