= M1 Metro North West & Bankstown Line =

Rapid transit line in Sydney, New South Wales, Australia

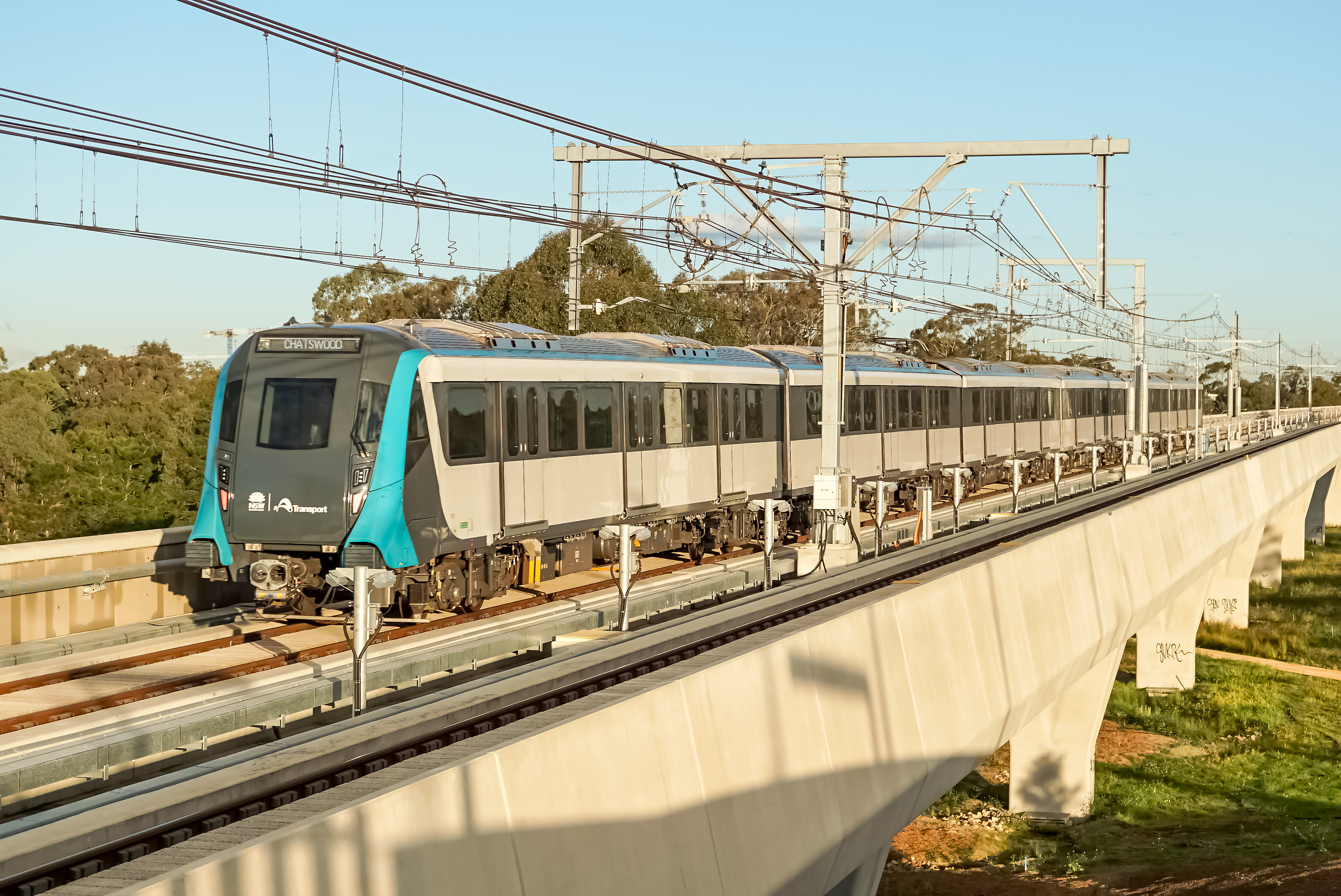
- A Metropolis Stock train departing Kellyville, June 2019

Overview
- Service type: Rapid transit
- Locale: Sydney, Australia
- First service: 26 May 2019 (Tallawong to Chatswood); 19 August 2024 (Chatswood to Sydenham); 30 October 2026 (Sydenham to Bankstown)
- Current operator: Metro Trains Sydney

Route
- Termini: Tallawong; Bankstown
- Stops: 31
- Distance travelled: 66 km (41 mi)
- Average journey time: 80 minutes
- Service frequency: 4 minutes (weekday peak); 5 minutes (weekday inter-peak); 10 minutes (weekends, weekday off-peak)

Technical
- Rolling stock: Metropolis Stock
- Track gauge: 1,435 mm (4 ft 8 1/2 in) standard gauge
- Electrification: 1,500 V DC from overhead catenary
- Operating speed: Limit of 100 km/h (62 mph)
- Track owner: Transport Asset Manager of New South Wales
Sydney rail network
Sydney Trains suburban services
T1 North Shore & Western
T2 Leppington & Inner West
T3 Liverpool & Inner West
T4 Eastern Suburbs & Illawarra
T5 Cumberland
T6 Lidcombe & Bankstown
T7 Olympic Park
T8 Airport & South
T9 Northern
Sydney Metro
M1 Metro North West & Bankstown

The M1 Metro North West & Bankstown Line is a rapid transit line in Sydney, New South Wales, Australia. The first and currently only line on the Sydney Metro network, it commenced operation on 26 May 2019, originally running between Tallawong and Chatswood, before the line was extended on 19 August 2024 to Sydenham, and to Bankstown on 30 October 2026.

== History ==
Services commenced in May 2019 between Tallawong and Chatswood via Epping as the Metro North West Line, over tracks either newly built or converted from Sydney Trains usage as part of the Sydney Metro Northwest project. In August 2024, the service was renamed as the M1 Metro North West & Bankstown Line and was extended from Chatswood to Sydenham via Central using new tunnels built as part of the Sydney Metro City & Southwest project. In 2026, the service extended to Bankstown following completion of the Bankstown railway line conversion, which opened on 30 October 2026.

== Service ==
Services on the line are operated by Metro Trains Sydney, a joint venture between the MTR Corporation, John Holland and UGL Rail. Services take 1 hour 21 minutes to traverse the stations from end to end, at a frequency at each station of every four minutes during peak hours, every ten minutes in the off peak and every 5 minutes intra-peak. Upon initial opening, the line previously operated at a frequency at each station of every five minutes during peak hours.

=== North West Night Bus ===
In the first six months of operations, regular metro services on the line were supplemented by a late night bus service known as the North West Night Bus, with 13 stops in close proximity to these stations. The bus service operated from Sunday to Wednesday nights after about 9.30 pm in both directions, filling in for final metro services at 10.05 pm from Chatswood and 9.25 pm from Tallawong, charging metro fares and operating at a frequency of every ten minutes. This service was temporary and was withdrawn six months later on 5 November 2019, when the metro reached full operations. The bus service was jointly operated by Transdev NSW and Hillsbus, both of whom previously jointly operated the Station Link services between September 2018 and May 2019.

=== Map ===
M1 interactive map. Stations in orange are shared with Sydney Trains.

=== Stations ===
Legend: Adjacent to a Train station
Adjacent to a Light Rail station
Adjacent to a Ferry wharf

All stations are fully accessible

List of M1 Sydney Metro North West & Bankstown Line stations
Station	Image	Suburb	Opened/converted	Grade	Connections
Tallawong	Metro station	Tallawong	26 May 2019	Open cut	none
Rouse Hill	Metro station	Rouse Hill	26 May 2019	Elevated	none
Kellyville	Busway station	Kellyville	26 May 2019	Elevated	none
Bella Vista	Metro station	Bella Vista	26 May 2019	Open cut	none
Norwest	Metro station	Norwest	26 May 2019	Underground	none
Hills Showground	Metro station	Castle Hill	26 May 2019	Underground	none
Castle Hill	Metro station	Castle Hill	26 May 2019	Underground	none
Cherrybrook	Metro station	Cherrybrook	26 May 2019	Open cut	none
Epping	Metro station	Epping	26 May 2019	Underground (Note: Underground railway station opened as part of the Epping to Chatswood rail link on 23 February 2009)	T9 Northern Line Central Coast & Newcastle Line
Macquarie University	Metro station	Macquarie Park	26 May 2019	Underground (Note: Railway station opened as part of the Epping to Chatswood rail link on 23 February 2009)	none
Macquarie Park	Metro station	Macquarie Park	26 May 2019	Underground	none
North Ryde	Metro station	North Ryde	26 May 2019	Underground	none
Chatswood	Metro station	Chatswood	26 May 2019	Elevated (Note: Railway station first opened as part of the North Shore railway line on 1 January 1890)	(CCN peak hours only)
Crows Nest	Metro station	Crows Nest	19 August 2024	Underground	none
Victoria Cross	Metro station	North Sydney	19 August 2024	Underground	none
Barangaroo	Metro station	Barangaroo, Sydney CBD	19 August 2024	Underground	Parramatta River ferry service Pyrmont Bay ferry service Blackwattle Bay ferry service
Martin Place	Metro station	Sydney CBD	19 August 2024	Underground	(SCO peak hours only)
Gadigal	Metro station	Sydney CBD	19 August 2024	Underground	none
Central	Metro station	Haymarket	19 August 2024	Underground	(SHL peak hours only)
Waterloo	Metro station	Waterloo	19 August 2024	Underground	none
Sydenham	Metro station	Sydenham	19 August 2024	Ground (Note: Railway station first opened on the South Coast railway line on 15 October 1884)	T4 Eastern Suburbs & Illawarra Line T8 Airport & South Line
Marrickville	Platform of Marrickville station.	Marrickville	30 October 2026	Ground (Note: Railway station first opened as part of the Belmore branch line on 1 February 1895)	none
Dulwich Hill	Metro station	Dulwich Hill	30 October 2026	Ground	Dulwich Hill Line
Hurlstone Park	Metro station	Hurlstone Park	30 October 2026	Ground	none
Canterbury	Metro station	Canterbury	30 October 2026	Ground	none
Campsie	Platform of Campsie station.	Campsie	30 October 2026	Ground	none
Belmore	Westbound view of Belmore station.	Belmore	30 October 2026	Ground	none
Lakemba	Platform of Lakemba station.	Lakemba	30 October 2026	Ground (Note: Railway station first opened as part of the Bankstown railway line on 14 April 1909)	none
Wiley Park	Northbound view of Wiley Park station.	Wiley Park	30 October 2026	Ground (Note: Railway station first opened as part of the Bankstown railway line on 19 June 1938)	none
Punchbowl	Metro station	Punchbowl	30 October 2026	Ground (Note: Railway station first opened as part of the Bankstown railway line on 14 April 1909)	none
Bankstown		Bankstown	30 October 2026	Ground	T6 Lidcombe & Bankstown Line

== Rolling stock ==
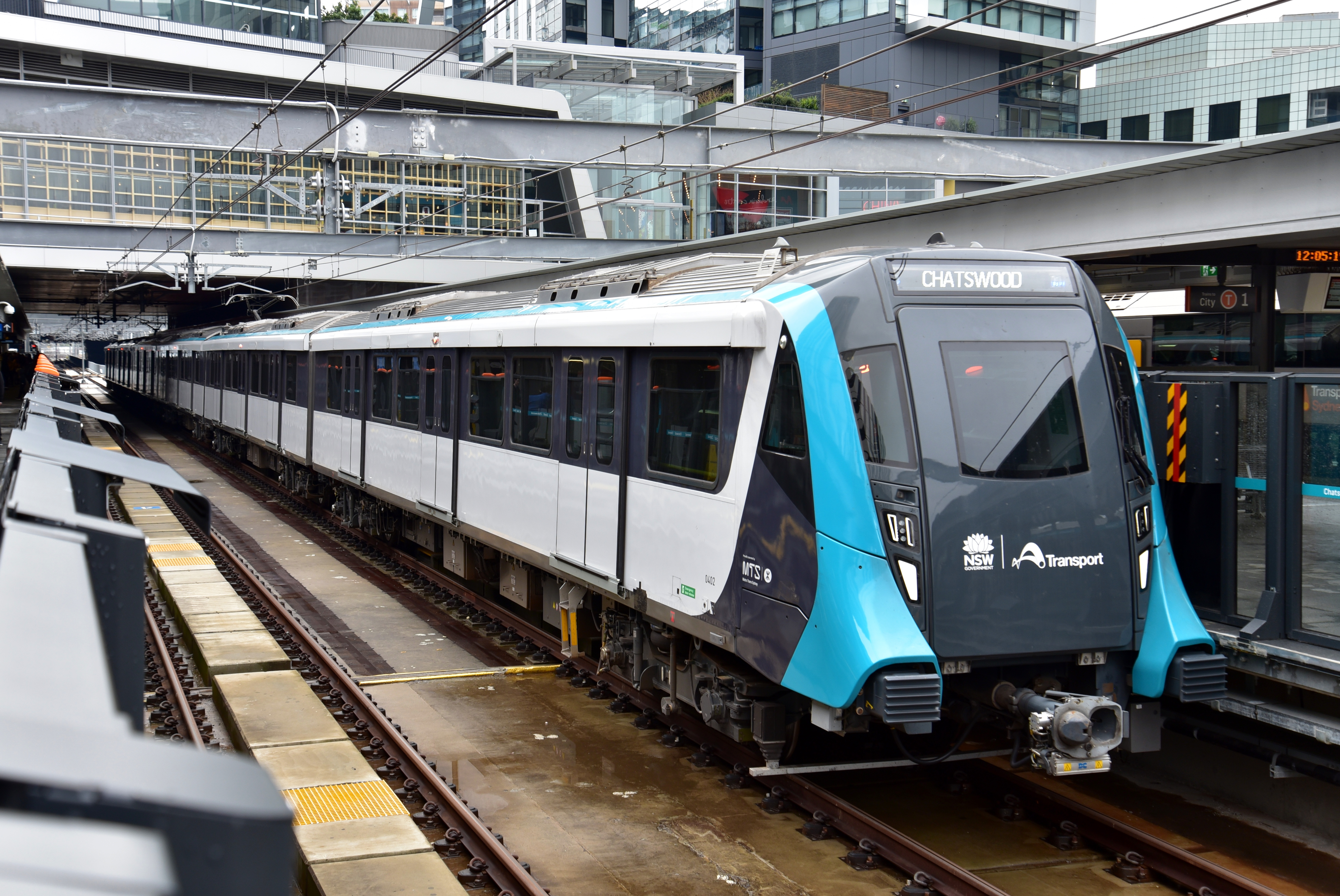
A Metropolis Stock train at Chatswood station in 2019

The line uses fully automated, single-deck electric multiple units, built by Alstom as part of their Metropolis family. A total of 270 carriages, making up 45 6-car sets have been built.

Other Sydney Metro lines will not use the Metropolis sets, with the Western Sydney Airport line using Sydney Metro Inspiro Stock ordered from Siemens and the Sydney Metro West will use trains ordered from CRRC.
