= Dulwich Hill railway station =

Railway station in Sydney, Australia

Dulwich Hill
- Eastbound view, November 2026

General information
- Location: Wardell Road, Dulwich Hill; Australia
- Coordinates: 33°54′40″S 151°08′27″E
- Elevation: 22 metres (72 ft)
- Owner: Transport Asset Manager of New South Wales
- Operator: Metro Trains Sydney (from 2026)
- Line: Metro North West & Bankstown Line
- Platforms: 2 (1 island)
- Tracks: 4
- Connections: Light Rail Bus

Construction
- Structure type: Ground
- Accessible: Yes

Other information
- Status: Weekdays: Staffed: 6am to 7pm; Weekends and public holidays: Unstaffed
- Station code: DHM
- Website: Transport for NSW

History
- Opened: 1 February 1895
- Closed: 30 September 2024
- Rebuilt: 30 October 2026
- Former names: Wardell Road (1895–1920)

Key dates
- 2014: Light rail terminus opened
- 2023: Western concourse opened

Passengers
- 2023: 987,660 (year); 2,706 (daily) (Sydney Trains, NSW TrainLink)

Services
Preceding station	Sydney Metro	Following station
Hurlstone Park towards Bankstown	M1 Metro North West & Bankstown Line	Marrickville towards Tallawong

Light rail connections
Preceding station	Sydney Light Rail	Following station
Terminus	Dulwich Hill Line	Dulwich Grove towards Central
Former services
Preceding station	Sydney Trains	Following station
Hurlstone Park towards Lidcombe or Liverpool	Bankstown Line (until 2024)	Marrickville towards City Circle
Location

Dulwich Hill railway station is a heritage-listed railway station serving the Sydney suburb of Dulwich Hill. It located on the Metro North West & Bankstown Line and is also the terminus of the Inner West Light Rail line, the heavy and light rail platforms being connected by an elevated concourse.

== History ==
Dulwich Hill station opened on 1 February 1895 as Wardell Road when the Bankstown line opened from Sydenham to Belmore. It was renamed Dulwich Hill on 1 July 1920.

To the north of the heavy rail platforms lie two tracks that are part of the Metropolitan Goods line. Opposite the platform lay a triangular junction that connected the Metropolitan Goods line to a branch to Rozelle. The branch was converted to light rail after goods traffic ceased, reopening on 27 March 2014 and terminating at Dulwich Hill.

The station has two heavy rail platforms in an island platform configuration, the only station on the section running parallel to the goods line not to be converted to side platforms. The station buildings date from 1935.

In October 2023, a new western concourse opened, providing lift access and transfer to the light rail platform.

The station closed on 30 September 2024 as part of works to convert the Bankstown line to Sydney Metro. It reopened on 30 October 2026.

== Platforms and services ==
Platform	Line	Stopping pattern	Notes
1	M1 Metro North West & Bankstown Line	services to Tallawong	
2	M1 Metro North West & Bankstown Line	services to Bankstown	

== Light rail ==
The light rail terminus sits at the end of Bedford Crescent, where the Rozelle branch line joined the main Metropolitan Goods railway line.

Line	Stopping pattern	Notes
Dulwich Hill Line	services to Central via Lilyfield	

=== History ===
The initial design had the light rail platform parallel to the heavy rail lines, but this was changed after a review favoured moving the stop to the end of Bedford Crescent. This final design includes a single side platform and is further away from the heavy rail platforms than the original proposal, but includes a connection to Jack Shanahan Park on the western side of the light rail alignment, which improved access to the park from the east and access to the stop from the west. Other improvements cited were reduced construction cost and environmental impact due to the elimination of the extensive work required to widen the cutting under the original proposal, and the reduced need to interface with RailCorp assets.

As patronage on the line increased, the single track terminus at Dulwich Hill came to limit the number of services on the line, with frequency unable to be less than every eight minutes. In 2017, Transport for NSW promised to consider upgrading the line to allow more services, including looking at the Dulwich Hill terminus.

== Transport links ==
Transit Systems operates one bus route via Dulwich Hill station, under contract to Transport for NSW:

- 412: Martin Place to Campsie station

Dulwich Hill station is served by one NightRide route:

- N40: East Hills station to Town Hall station

== Gallery ==
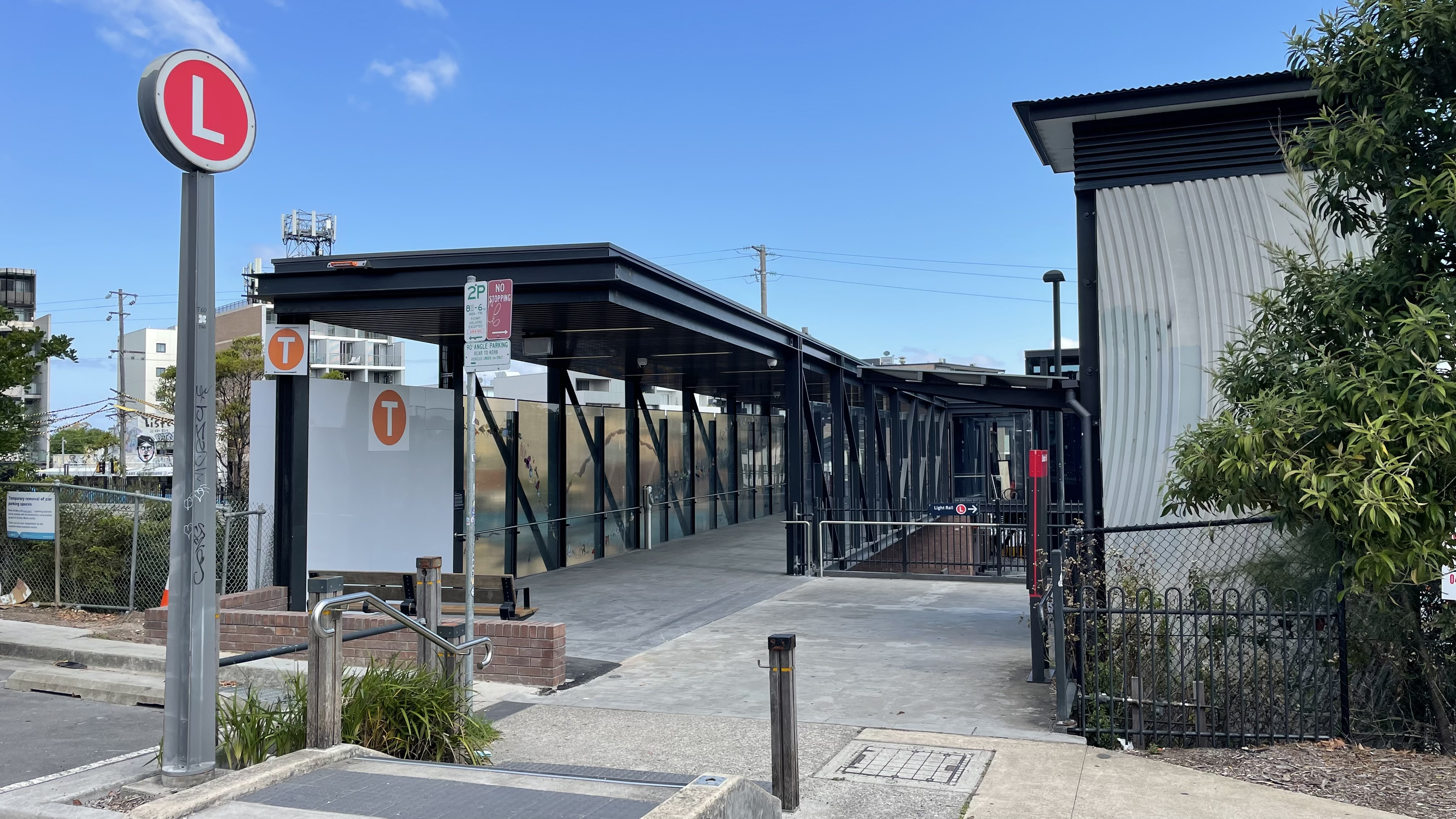
Northern entrance on Bedford Crescent

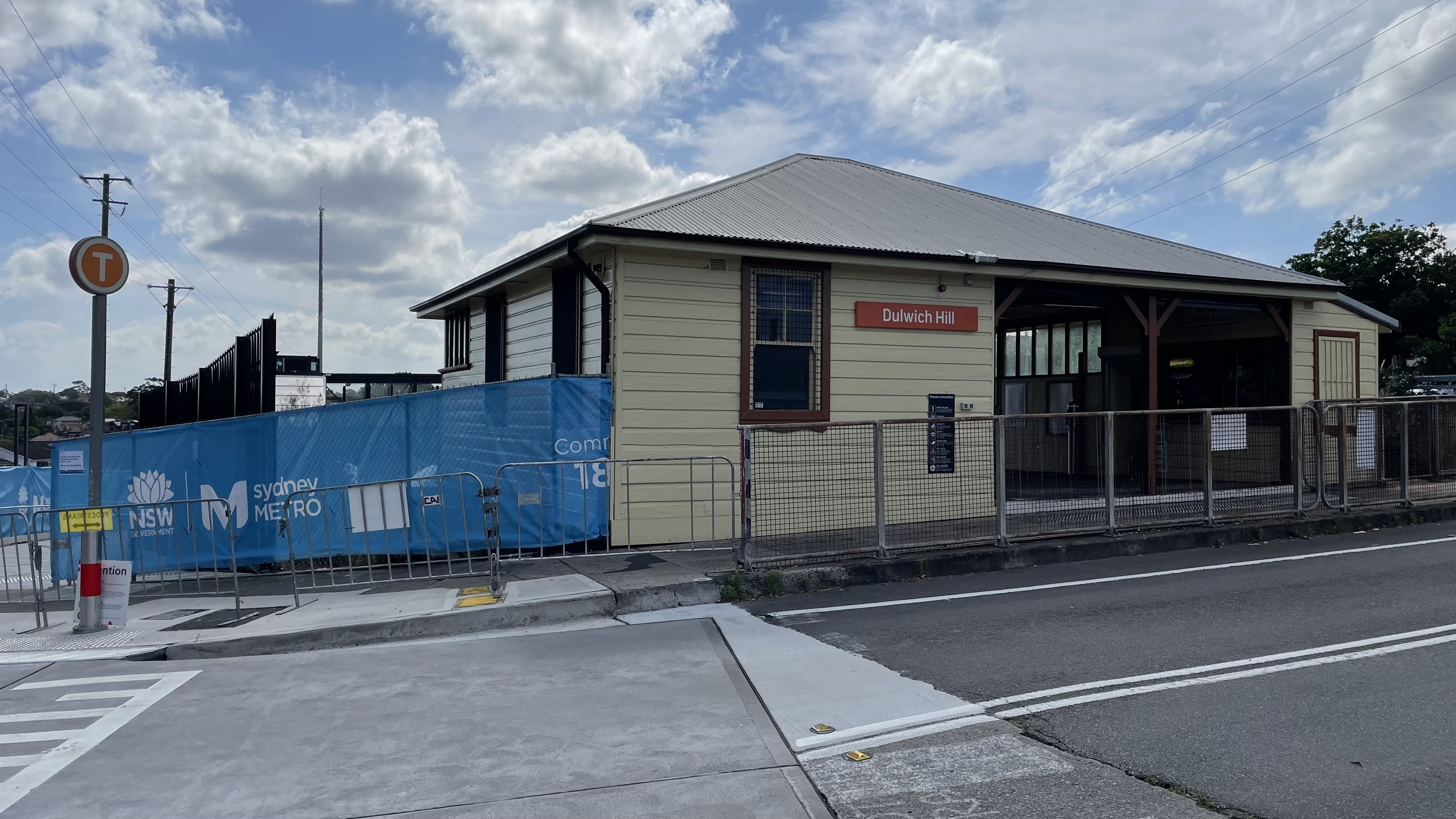
Eastern entrance on Wardell Road

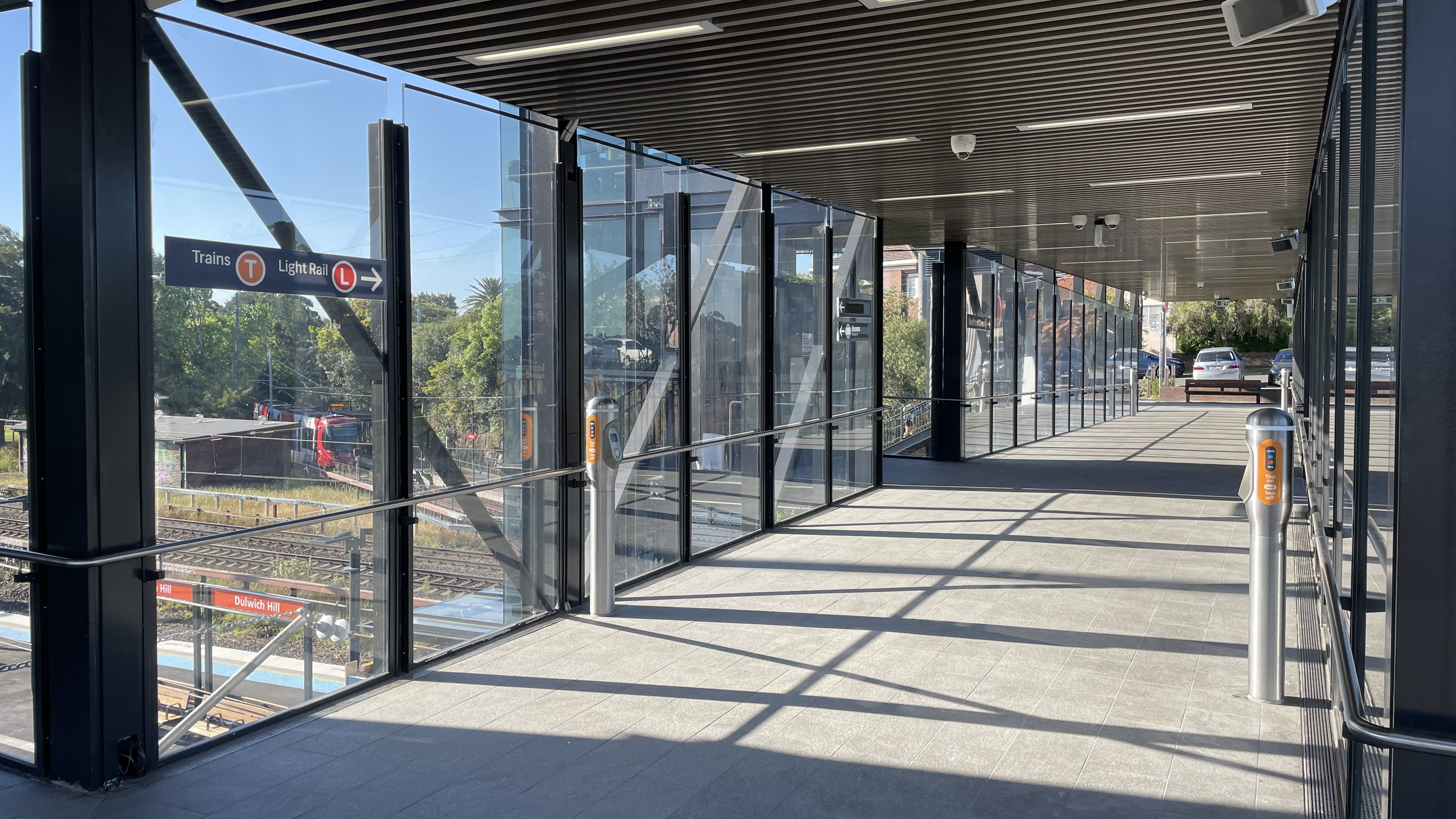
Western concourse, connecting the metro and light rail platforms

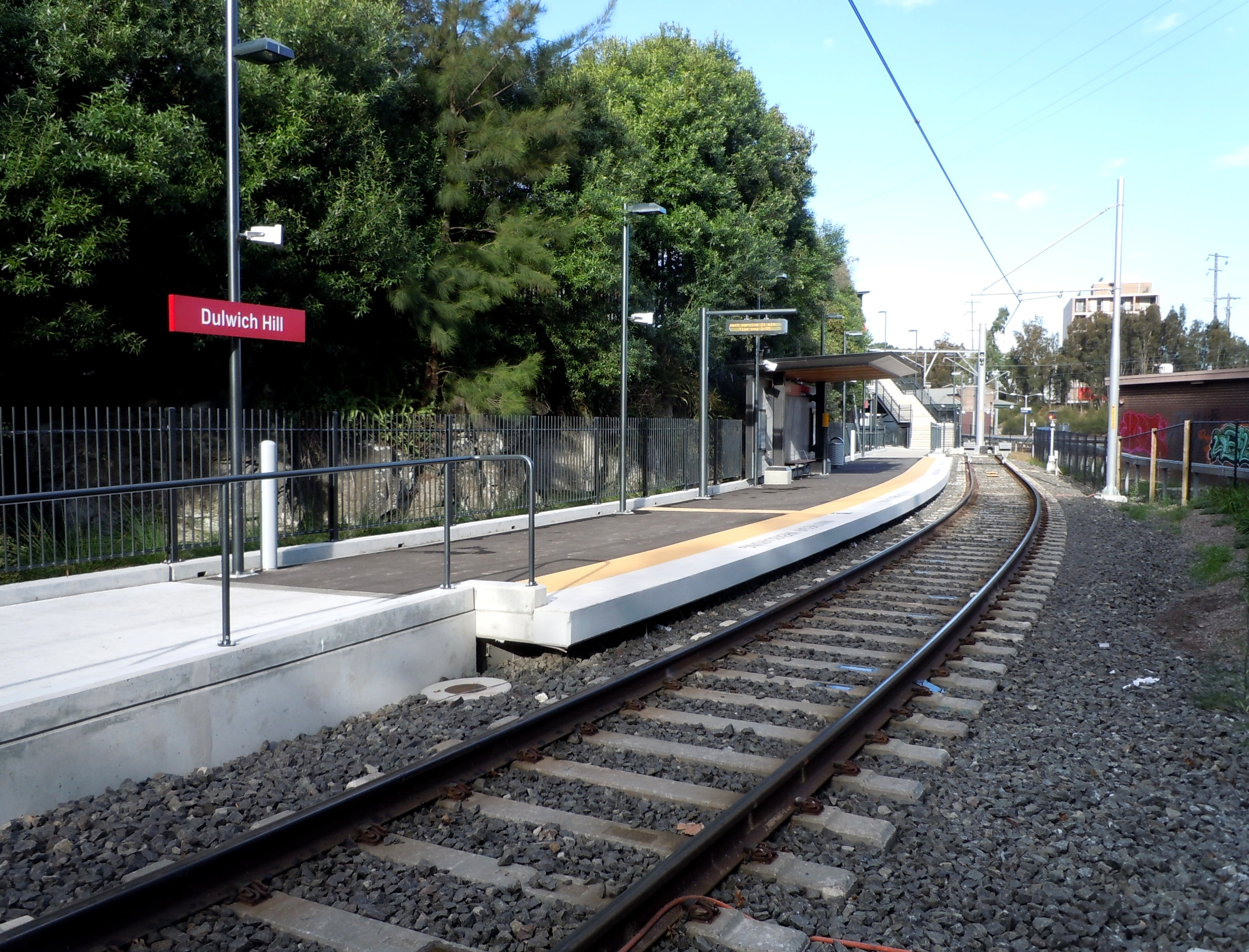
Light rail platform
