= Lakemba Nights during Ramadan =

Festival in western Sydney, New South Wales, Australia

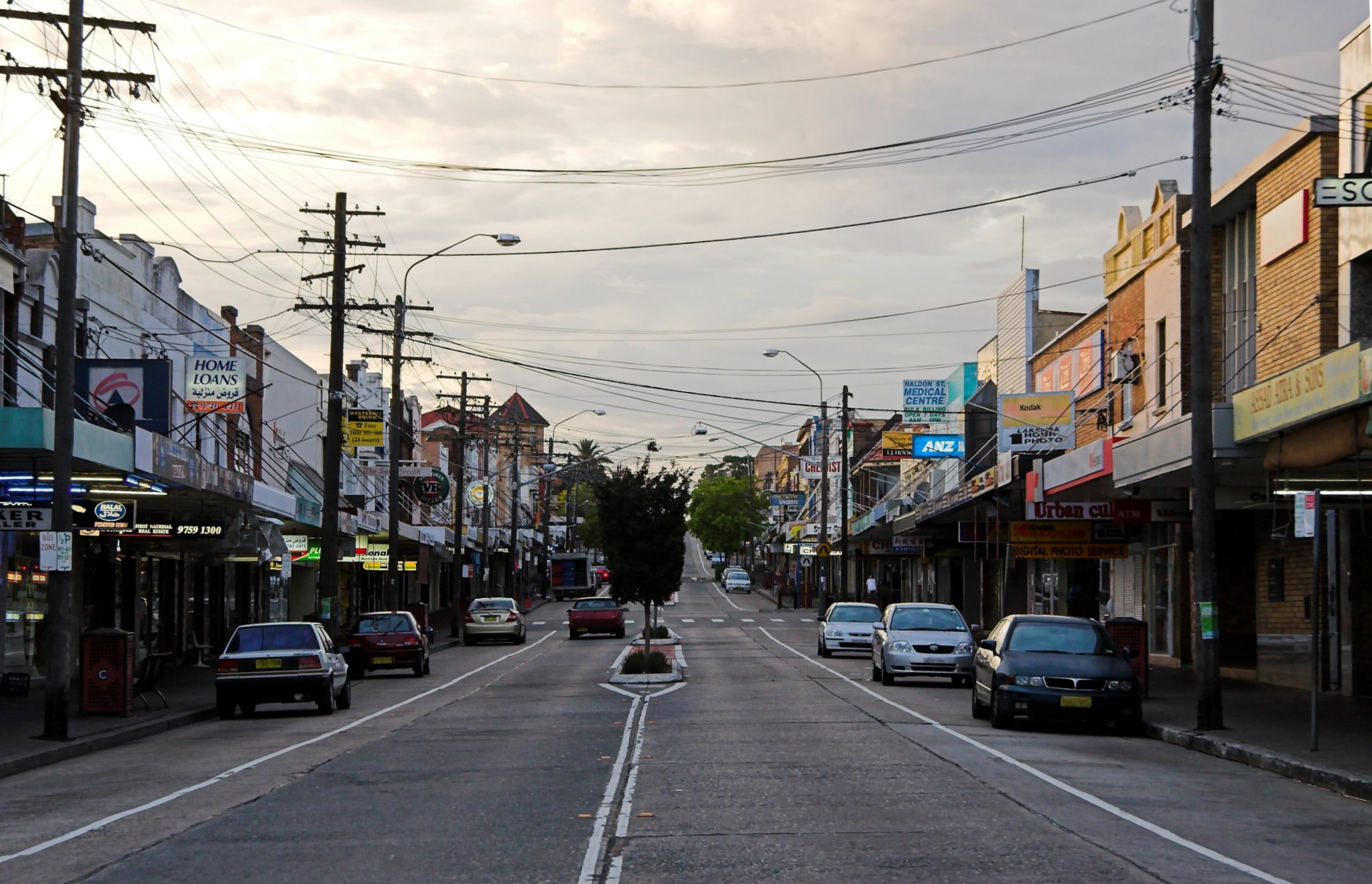
- View of Haldon Street, Lakemba in 2007
- Status: Active
- Dates: Thursday to Sunday during Ramadan
- Frequency: Annually
- Location: Lakemba
- Inaugurated: 2007
- Previous event: 19 February – 15 March 2026
- Next event: 2027
- Attendance: 1.6 million (2024)
- Major events: Food from multiple cultures
- Organiser: City of Canterbury Bankstown
- Website: www.cbcity.nsw.gov.au/Lakemba-nights-during-ramadan

Lakemba Nights during Ramadan (formerly known as Ramadan Nights, Lakemba) is a festival in the western Sydney suburb of Lakemba that takes place during Ramadan. The festival takes place along Haldon Street.

== History ==
The festival started in 2007 and as of 2022 can attract up to 30,000 attendees on weekends.

In October 2024 Canterbury-Bankstown Council made changes to streamline the running of the event including a name change from "Ramadan Nights, Lakemba" to "Lakemba Nights" and reducing the number of days the festival operated. For that year's event, the council spent $3 million on the event with 1.6 million people from all over Australia in attendance. In November, the council renamed the event to 'Lakemba Nights during Ramadan' following criticism of the secular nature of 'Lakemba Nights'.

In 2025, the festival had around 51,000 visitors per day over the 20 nights it was open.

== Reception ==
When the festival was renamed from Lakemba Ramadan Nights to Lakemba Nights, the reaction from western Sydney's Muslim and non-Muslim community was mixed.

Muslims have been critical that there is a much larger share of non-Muslim patronage and fewer true links to Ramadan at the festival.

== Funding ==
The New South Wales state government partially funds the event via their Vibrant Streets Package under the Permit/Plug/Play Pilot Program. The event is also funded by the Multicultural NSW Stronger Together Local Council Major Festival Grant. The event is sponsored by Western Union, SBS and Sydney Water.
