= Hurlstone Park railway station =

Railway station in Sydney, New South Wales, Australia

Hurlstone Park
- Platform, November 2026

General information
- Location: Floss Street, Hurlstone Park; Australia
- Coordinates: 33°54′38″S 151°07′55″E
- Elevation: 23 metres (75 ft)
- Owner: Transport Asset Manager of New South Wales
- Operator: Metro Trains Sydney (from 2026)
- Line: Metro North West & Bankstown Line
- Distance: 8.80 kilometres (5.47 mi) from Central
- Platforms: 2 side
- Tracks: 4
- Connections: Bus

Construction
- Structure type: Ground
- Accessible: Yes

Other information
- Status: Weekdays: Staffed: 6am to 7pm: Weekends and public holidays: Unstaffed
- Station code: HPK
- Website: Transport for NSW

History
- Opened: 1 February 1895
- Closed: 30 September 2024
- Rebuilt: 30 October 2026
- Former names: Fern Hill (1895–1911)

Passengers
- 2023: 562,020 (year); 1,540 (daily) (Sydney Trains, NSW TrainLink)

Services
Preceding station	Sydney Metro	Following station
Canterbury towards Bankstown	M1 Metro North West & Bankstown Line	Dulwich Hill towards Tallawong
Former services
Preceding station	Sydney Trains	Following station
Canterbury towards Lidcombe or Liverpool	Bankstown Line (until 2024)	Dulwich Hill towards City Circle
Location

Hurlstone Park railway station is a heritage-listed railway station located on the Metro North West & Bankstown Line, serving the Sydney suburb of Hurlstone Park.

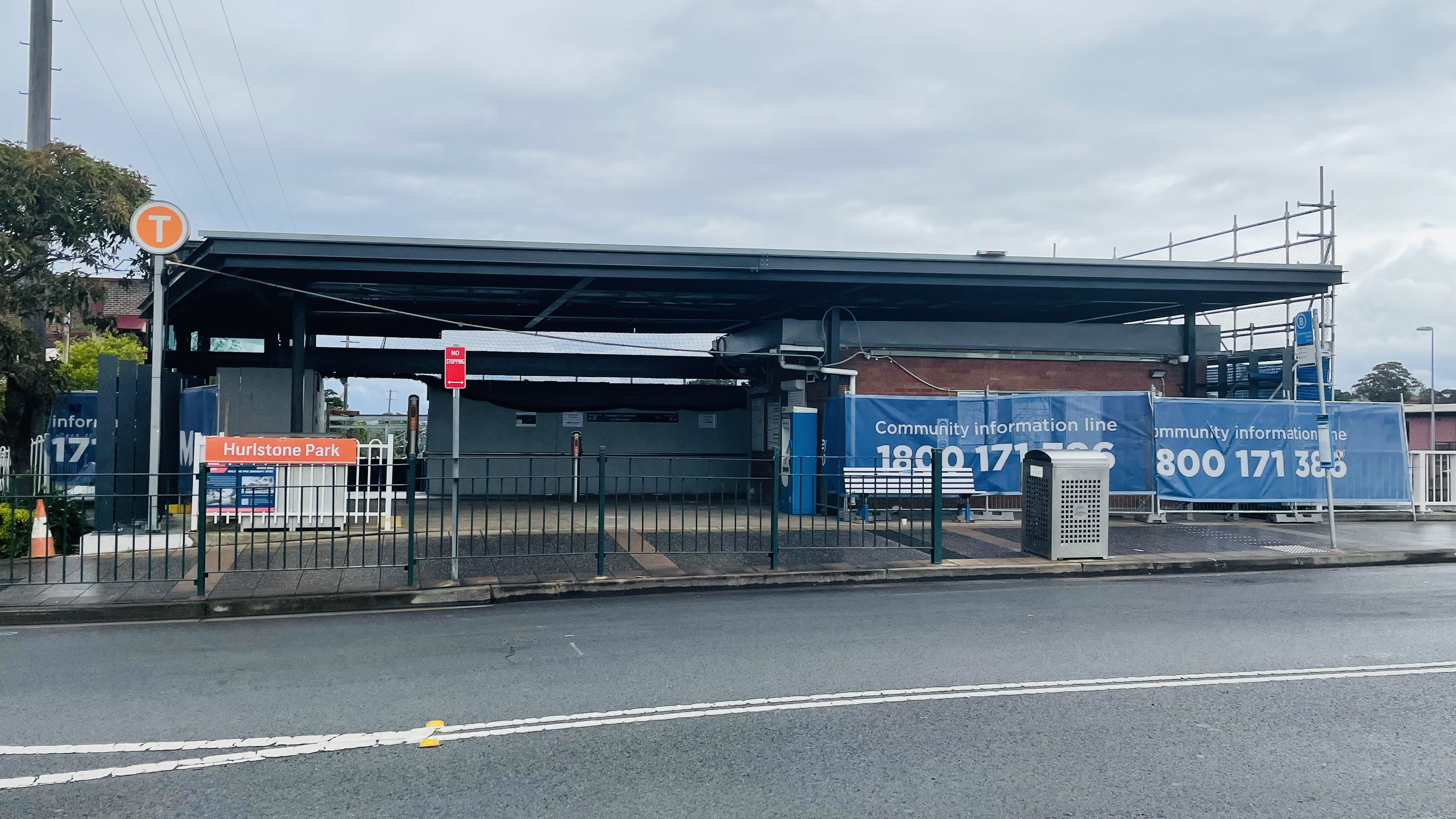
Station entrance on Floss Street

== History ==
Hurlstone Park station opened on 1 February 1895 as Fern Hill when the Bankstown line opened from Sydenham to Belmore. It was renamed Hurlstone Park on 19 August 1911.

To the north of the station, lie two tracks that are part of the Metropolitan Goods line. The westbound line has a platform face, this was taken out of use when the Metropolitan Goods line was built in 1915.

The station was upgraded and received lifts and tactile indicators in 2023 in preparation for the line's conversion to Sydney Metro in 2026, which commenced on 30 September 2024. It reopened on 30 October 2026.

== Platforms and services ==
Platform	Line	Stopping pattern	Notes
1	M1 Metro North West & Bankstown Line	services to Tallawong	
2	M1 Metro North West & Bankstown Line	services to Bankstown	

== Transport links ==
Transit Systems operates two bus routes via Hurlstone Park station:

- 406: Hurlstone Park to Five Dock
- 418: Westfield Burwood to Sydenham
