= Marrickville railway station =

Railway station in Sydney, New South Wales, Australia

Marrickville
- Platform, November 2026

General information
- Location: Illawarra Road, Marrickville; Australia
- Coordinates: 33°54′51″S 151°09′17″E
- Elevation: 13 metres (43 ft)
- Owner: Transport Asset Manager of New South Wales
- Operator: Metro Trains Sydney
- Line: Metro North West & Bankstown Line
- Distance: 6.85 kilometres (4.26 mi) from Central
- Platforms: 2 side
- Tracks: 4
- Connections: Bus

Construction
- Structure type: Ground
- Parking: None
- Cycle facilities: Bike locker available
- Accessible: Yes

Other information
- Status: Staffed
- Station code: MRV
- Website: Transport for NSW

History
- Opened: 1 February 1895
- Closed: 30 September 2024
- Rebuilt: 30 October 2026

Passengers
- 2023: 1,906,260 (year); 5,223 (daily) (Sydney Trains, NSW TrainLink)

Services
Preceding station	Sydney Metro	Following station
Dulwich Hill towards Bankstown	M1 Metro North West & Bankstown Line	Sydenham towards Tallawong
Former services
Preceding station	Sydney Trains	Following station
Dulwich Hill towards Lidcombe or Liverpool	Bankstown Line (until 2024)	Sydenham towards City Circle
Location

Marrickville railway station is a heritage-listed railway station located on the Metro North West & Bankstown Line, serving the Sydney suburb of Marrickville. It was added to the New South Wales State Heritage Register on 2 April 1999.

== History ==
Marrickville station opened on 1 February 1895 when the Bankstown line opened from Sydenham to Belmore.

When the station opened, it consisted only of the island platform. In 1916, the station's platforms were reconstructed with a new platform, now platform 2, built to the south of the island platform and the northern side of the island platform closed to make way for the Metropolitan Goods Line. The station has retained this set-up to date.

The line through the station was electrified in 1926. The booking office on Platform 2 underwent alterations in 1944.

New stairs down from Illawarra Road were built in 1985.

In June 2016, an upgrade was completed with lifts and a new concourse built. During this work, the stairs to platform 1 were closed and replaced with a temporary footbridge from platform 2. Both platforms can be accessed from Illawarra Rd via the new concourse. Even though a concourse was built, the station remains ungated.

The station closed on 30 September 2024 as part of the conversion of the Bankstown line to Sydney Metro. It reopened on 30 October 2026.

== Platforms and services ==
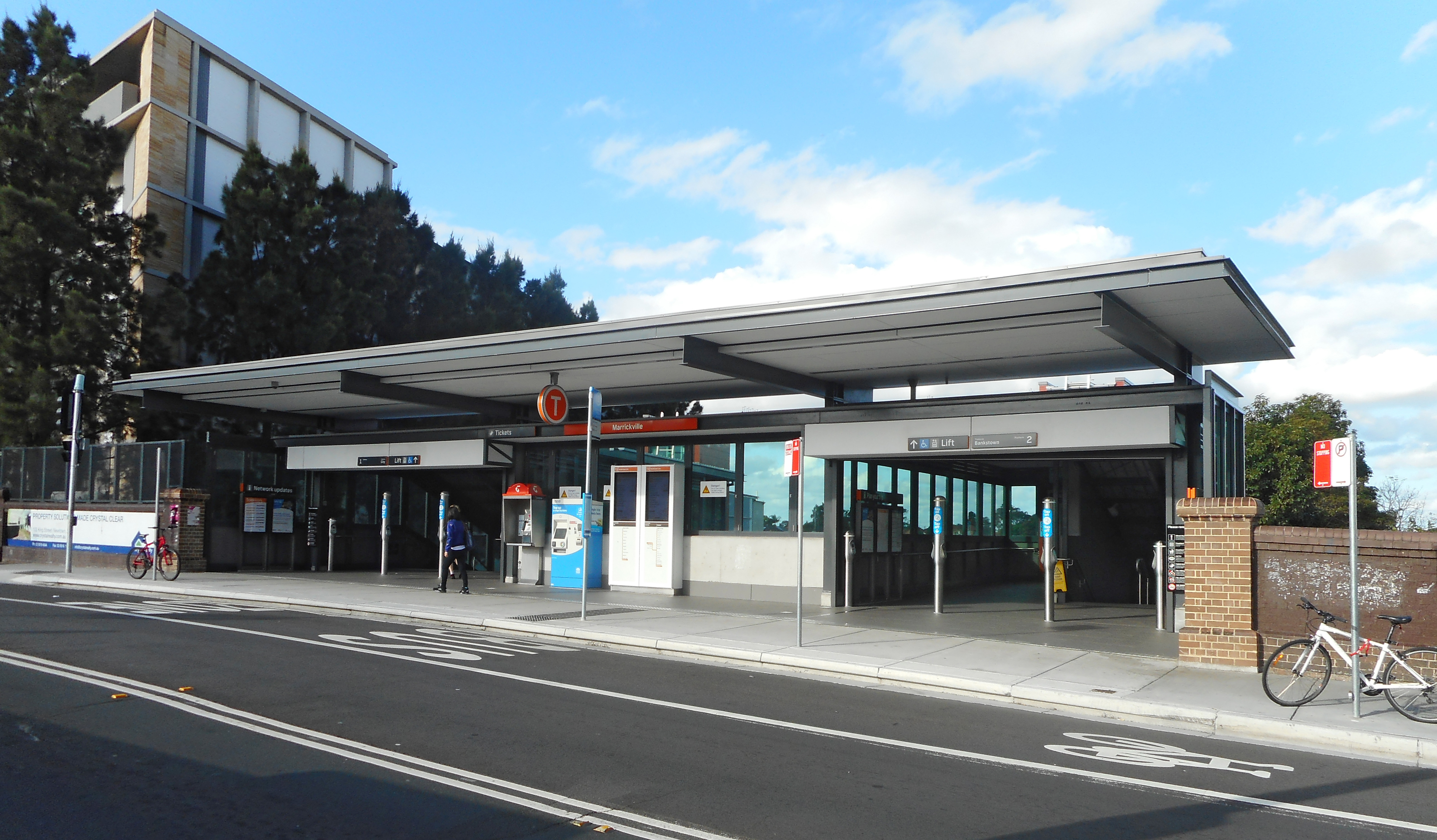
Main entrance in 2017

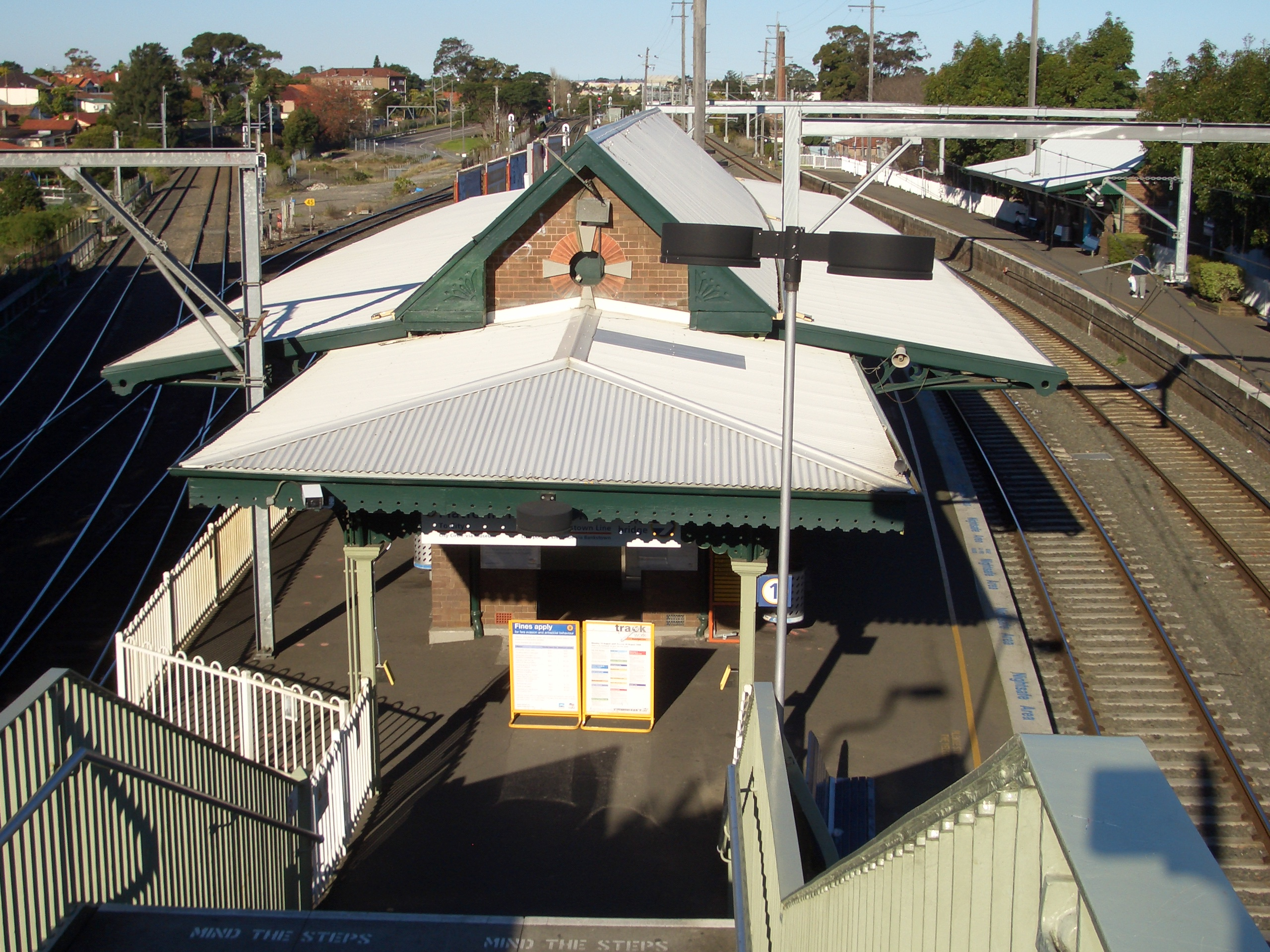
Station in 2006 prior to upgrade

Platform	Line	Stopping pattern	Notes
1	M1 Metro North West & Bankstown Line	services to Tallawong	
2	M1 Metro North West & Bankstown Line	services to Bankstown	

== Transport links ==
Transit Systems operates two bus routes via Marrickvile station, under contract to Transport for NSW:

- 423: Martin Place to Kingsgrove Bus Depot
- 423X: Martin Place to Kingsgrove Bus Depot

Marrickville station is served by one NightRide route:

- N40: East Hills station to Town Hall station

== Description ==
The Marrickville station complex consists of two station buildings: the Platform 1 building (1895) and Platform 2 building (1911), with associated platforms built at the same time, along with a booking office on Platform 2 (1917). It also includes two sets of pedestrian steps: a northern set (1917) and a southern set (mid-1980s), along with an overbridge on Illawarra Road (1911).

Marrickville railway station consists of one wayside platform to the south and an island platform to the north. Passenger rail only uses the south side of the island platform, with the Metropolitan Goods Line running on the north. The station buildings are original, as is the booking office at the western end of Platform 2. The station is accessed via stairs or lifts to both platforms from the concourse, or at a level entry onto Platform 2 from Station St. Illawarra Road is a major commercial shopping strip.

Platform building – Platform 1 (1895)

The Platform 1 building is a rectangular polychromatic face brick building with gabled roof and surrounding cantilevered awning clad in corrugated roof sheeting. The exterior was restored to original condition during upgrades in 2016. It contains a number of rooms, such as a ticket office, waiting rooms and toilets. The ticket office is no longer in use, as all paper tickets have been phased out on the Sydney Trains network in favour of smartcard ticketing (Opal card). All other rooms, except the toilets, are also locked off and not accessible to the public.

Platform building – Platform 2 (1911)

The Platform 2 building is a rectangular face brick building with gabled roof and integral shallower sloped single cantilevered awning. Internally, the building comprises a general waiting room; ladies room and ladies toilets, a store and men's toilets. As with the building on Platform 1, the exterior was restored during the 2016 upgrades. The whole building is closed to the public, mostly used as a storeroom.

Booking office (1917)

The original timber framed overhead booking office dating from 1895 was demolished and the existing timber framed booking office located on Platform 2 built in 1917–18. The building is a simple, rectangular weatherboard clad timber-framed structure, with a gable roof clad in corrugated steel which extends as an awning with exposed rafters on the platform side. The building is currently used as a storeroom.

Platforms

Platform 1 has an asphalt surface with the original brick face and edge. The northern side of this platform (not used and fenced off) has a brick edge with the original brick face. Platform 2 also has its original brick face but with a concrete edge. Both platforms are approximately 160 metres long, enough to fit an 8 carriage suburban train. Both platforms are slightly curved and are equipped with LCD screens displaying next trains, together with automated announcements. Due to the lack of shelter at the eastern end of both platforms, there are no screens at this end. There are two small waiting shelters around the middle of platform 1, to encourage waiting passengers to spread out when it is raining, as all the station buildings are at the western end of the platform.

Overbridge (1911)

Steel girders and a concrete slab supported on central brick piers and side brick abutments. The original access stairs from the overbridge to Platform 1 had the original steel stringers but had new concrete treads and a new steel balustrade. The later stairs on the south were constructed from steel stringers supported on steel columns and with precast concrete treads. Both of these stairs were removed and replaced by the concourse during the 2016 upgrades.

== Heritage listing ==
The railway station at Marrickville is significant as it is a station on the Sydenham to Bankstown Line which was constructed to relieve congestion on the Main South Line as well as to encourage suburban development and the growth of agriculture in the late 19th and early 20th century. The highly intact main platform building represents the period of transition from the boom time of the 1880s to the standardisation of NSW railway building design from the 1890s onwards, while the booking office on Platform 2 reflects a later period of expansion in the first quarter of the 20th century.

Marrickville Railway Station is significant at a State level as the platform building demonstrates the high level of aesthetic design of the pre-1900 standard buildings, which included the use of polychromatic brickwork, decorative dentil coursing, ornate awning brackets and carved bargeboards. The platform building is intact and is representative of a small group of such ornate platform buildings including Canterbury and Belmore on the Bankstown Line. The platform building on Platform 2 provides an interesting contrast, demonstrating the simpler design of the standard platform buildings of the 1910/20s.

Also of significance is the intactness of the weatherboard booking office which is unusual for being one of the few examples of a booking office located on a platform with street entry only and no access from the footbridge or overbridge, though the structure itself is representative of a standard design.

Marrickville railway station was listed on the New South Wales State Heritage Register on 2 April 1999 having satisfied the following criteria.

- The place is important in demonstrating the course, or pattern, of cultural or natural history in New South Wales
- The place is important in demonstrating aesthetic characteristics and/or a high degree of creative or technical achievement in New South Wales
- The place has strong or special association with a particular community or cultural group in New South Wales for social, cultural or spiritual reasons
- The place has potential to yield information that will contribute to an understanding of the cultural or natural history of New South Wales
- The place possesses uncommon, rare or endangered aspects of the cultural or natural history of New South Wales
- The place is important in demonstrating the principal characteristics of a class of cultural or natural places/environments in New South Wales

== Trackplan ==
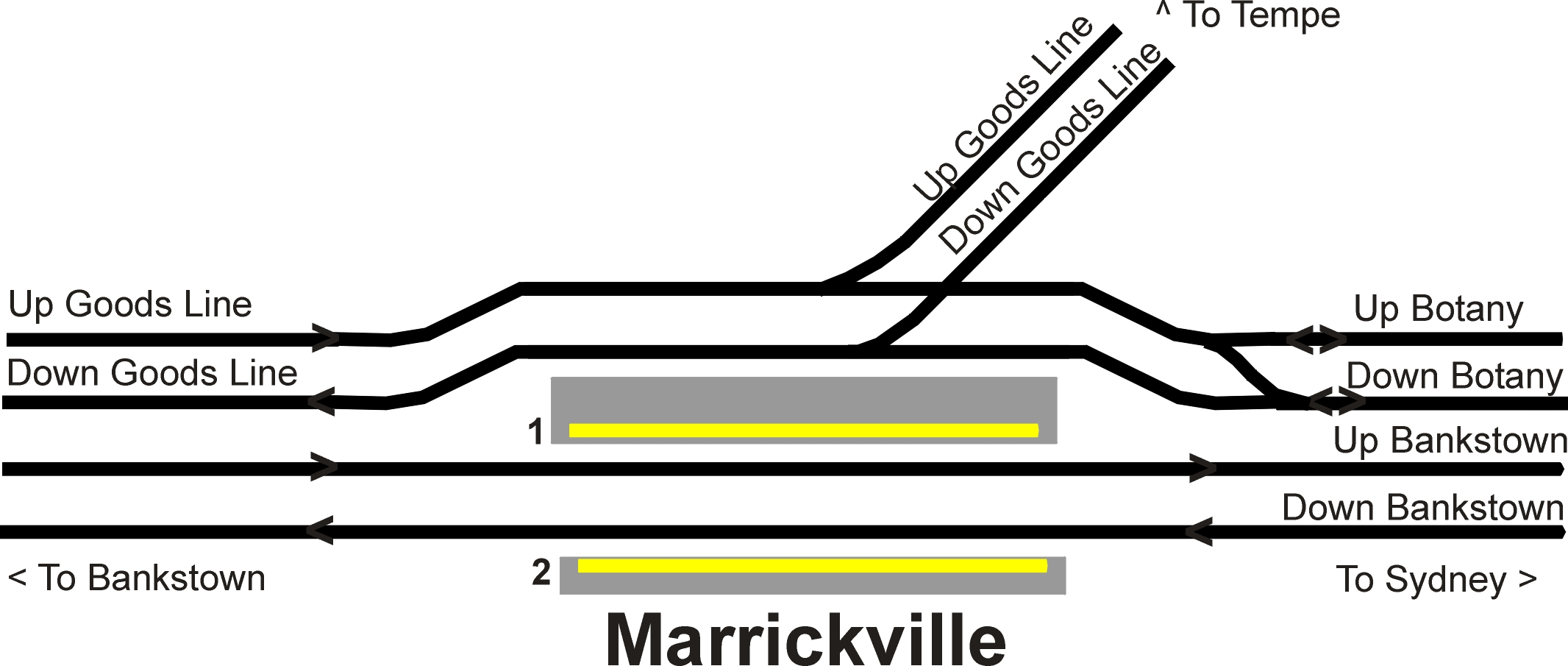
Track layout
