= Belmore, New South Wales =

Belmore
- Suburb
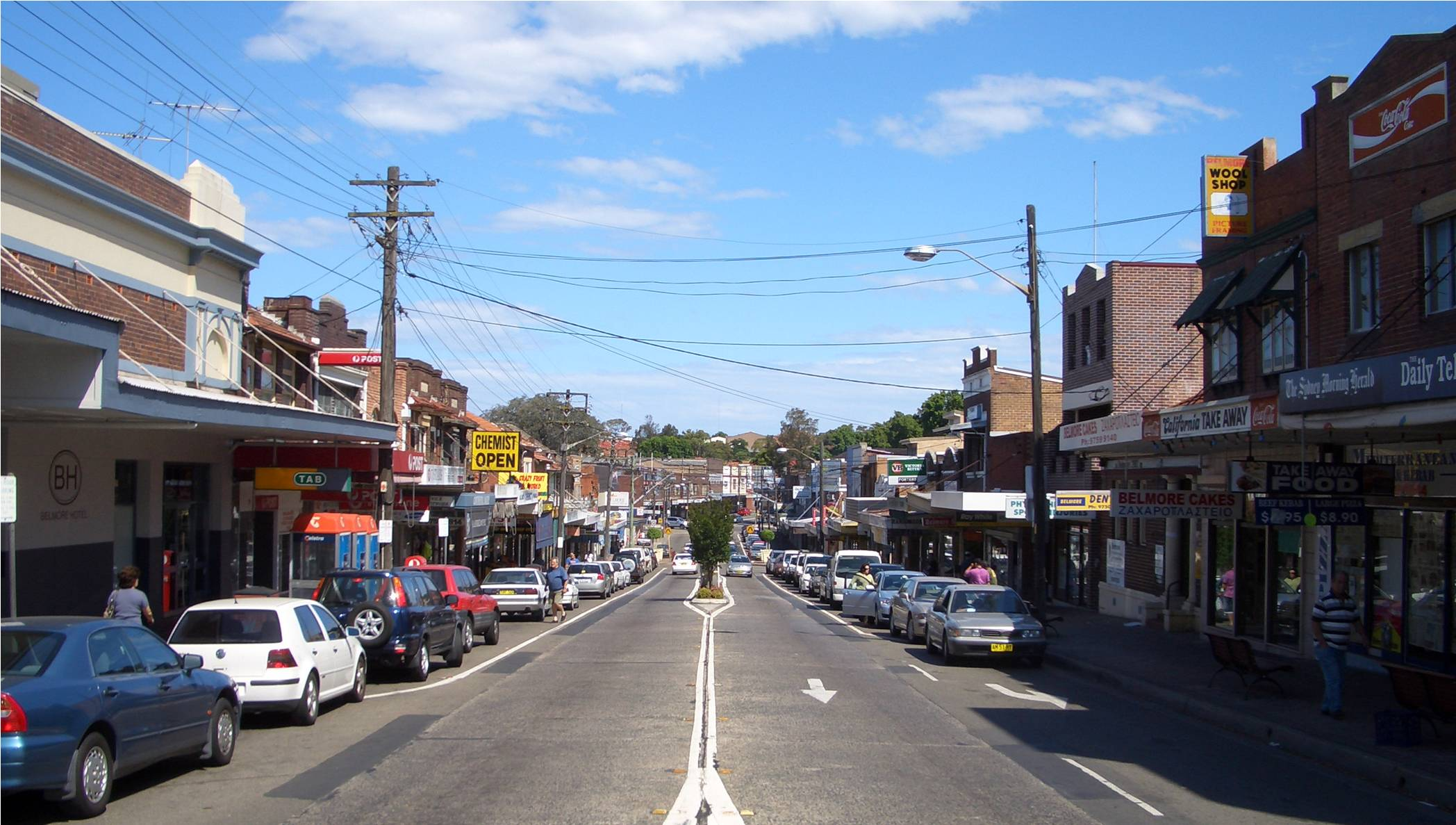
- Burwood Road, Belmore

- Interactive map of Belmore
- Country: Australia
- State: New South Wales
- City: Sydney
- LGA: City of Canterbury-Bankstown
- Location: 11 km (6.8 mi) south-west of Sydney CBD

Government
  - State electorate: Canterbury
  - Federal divisions: Barton; Watson
- Elevation: 33 m (108 ft)

Population
  - Total: 13,781 (2021 census)
- Postcode: 2192
Suburbs around Belmore
Greenacre	Strathfield	Canterbury
Lakemba	Belmore	Campsie
Roselands	Kingsgrove	Clemton Park

Belmore is a suburb of Sydney, in the state of New South Wales, Australia. Belmore is located 11 kilometres south-west of the Sydney central business district, in the local government area of the City of Canterbury-Bankstown.

== History ==
Belmore is named after the fourth Earl of Belmore, Governor of New South Wales from 1868 to 1872. The area was known as Darkwater in its early days. Some of the first land grants in 1810 were 40.5 hectares (100 acres) to Richard Robinson east of Sharp Street and Kingsgrove Road and 24 hectares (60 acres) to Thomas Mansfield, to the west. Francis Wild and John Sullivan were each granted 12 hectares (30 acres) in 1823. The area was originally used for market gardens and orchards. Subdivision started after the railway came through in 1895.

The first school, Belmore South Primary School opened on 25 April 1892 and the post office opened in 1907. The town centre began developing in the 1920s and features some classic examples of art-deco architecture.

== Heritage listings ==
Belmore has a number of heritage-listed sites, including:

- Burwood Road: Belmore railway station
- 32-36 Redman Parade: Community facilities
- 481 Burwood Road: Doctor's surgery
- 543 Burwood Road: Electricity Substation No. 274
- 5 Knox Street: Electricity Substation No. 276
- 35 Isabel Street: Federation and Inter War House
- 37-37A Isabel Street: Federation and Inter War House
- 39 Isabel Street: Federation and Inter War House
- 2 Wilson Avenue: Federation Bakery, White House Bakery
- 436 Burwood Road: Federation detached house Station Master's house
- 37 Wilson Avenue: Federation House
- 52 Albert Street: Federation House
- 43 Wilson Avenue: Federation Weatherboard House
- 370-372 Burwood Road: Inter War Building Post Office (former)
- 35, 37 & 39 Isabel Street: Federation and Inter War House
- 2, 4, 6, 8, 10, 12, 14, 16, 18 Lakemba Street: Californian Bungalows Inter War House
- 103-105 Lakemba Street: Built in the 1920s
- 12 Oxford Street: Victorian House
- 31 Forsyth Street: Victorian Villa The Towers

== Houses ==
Belmore has a high percentage of period homes. It is predominantly a low-rise residential area full of well-maintained period family homes with large back-yards, wide tree-lined streets, and small parks and playgrounds. Art Deco shop façades dominate the small shopping strip. There are now an increasing number of high-rise units in the suburb mostly along Canterbury Road.

== Commercial area ==
Belmore contains a mixture of residential, significant landmarks, commercial and industrial developments. The main commercial area is located along Burwood Road, near Belmore railway station. Commercial and industrial developments are also located along Canterbury Road and surrounding streets.

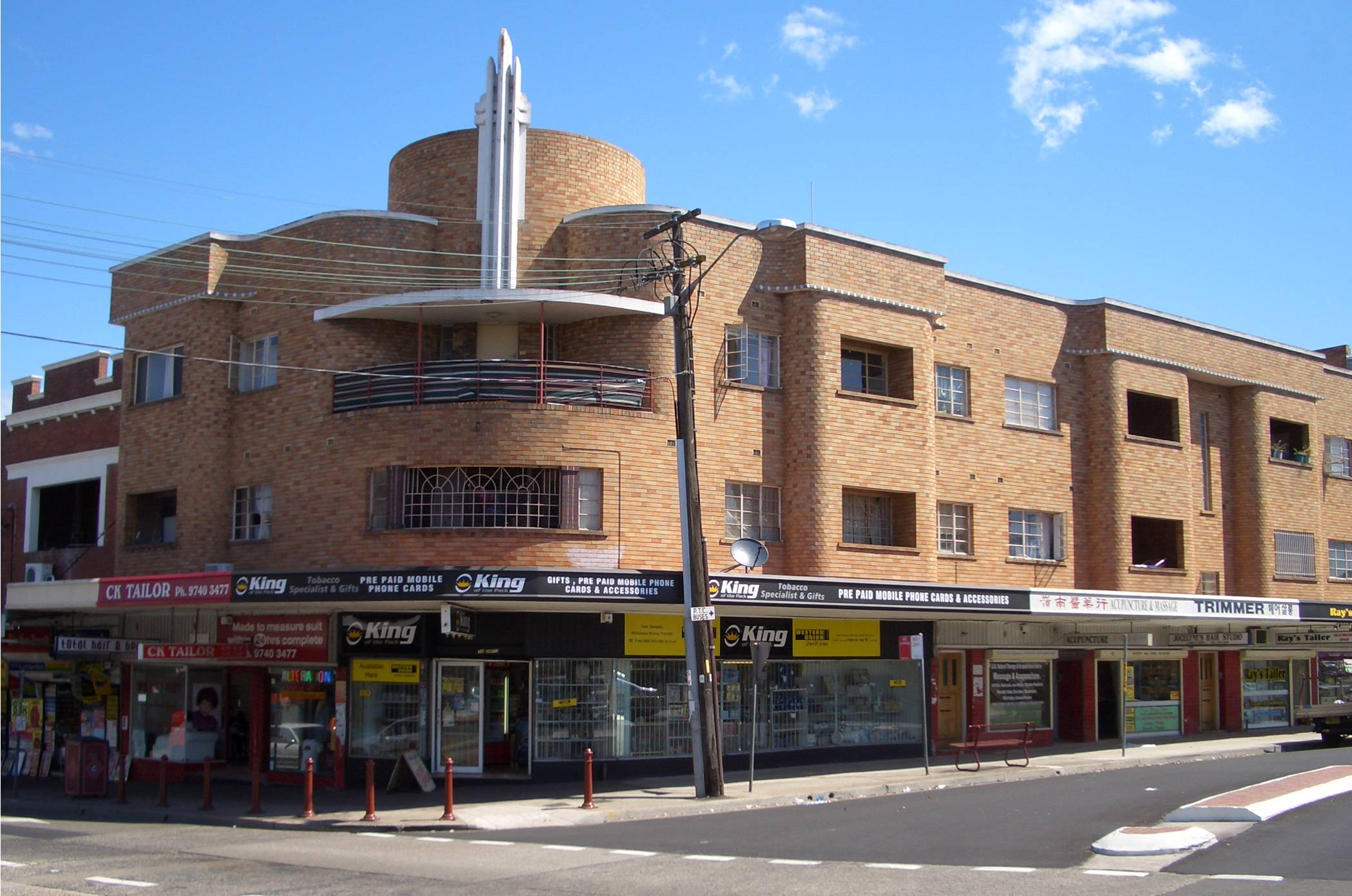
Art-deco building, corner Burwood Road and Bridge Road

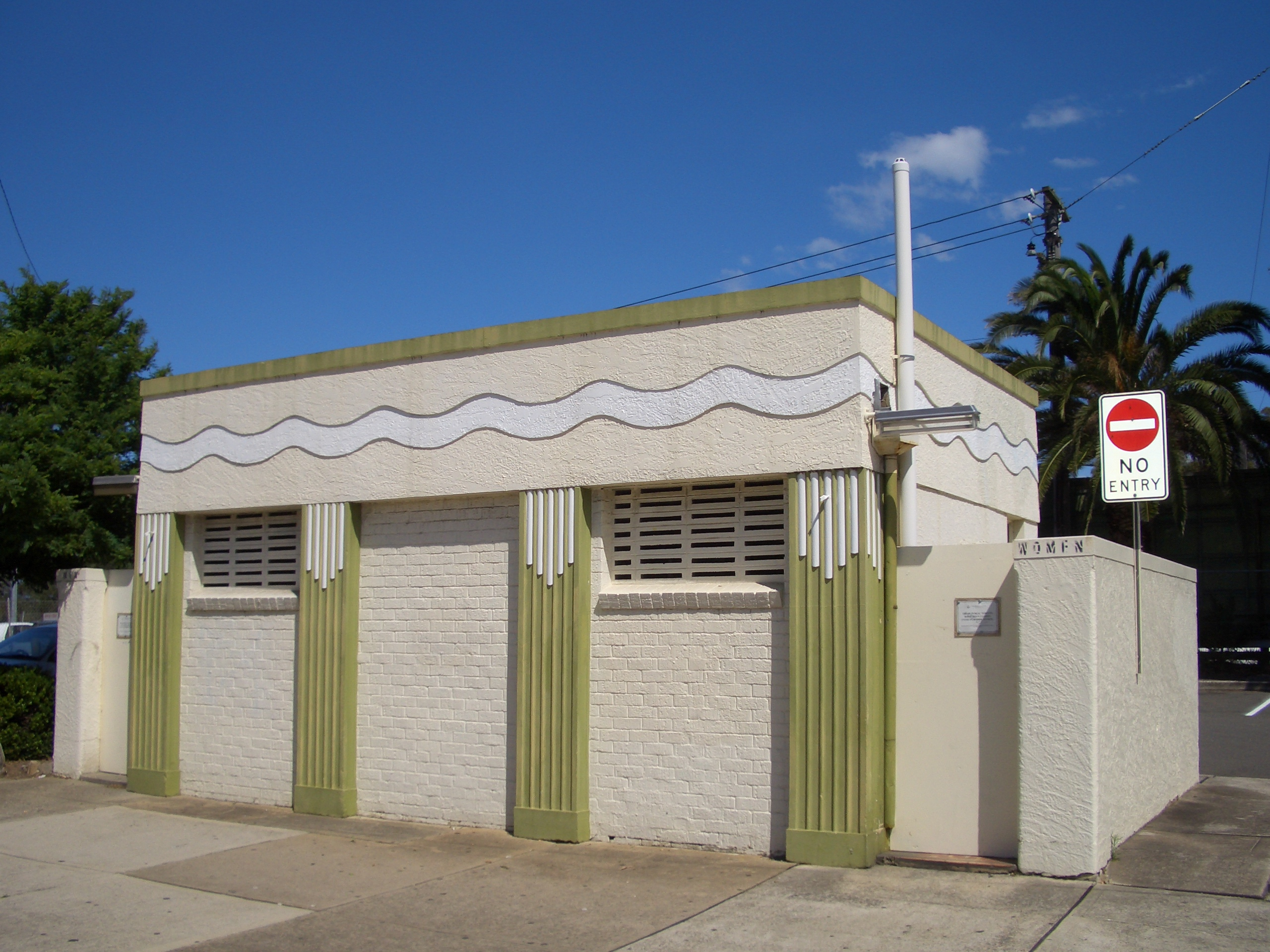
Art-deco amenities block

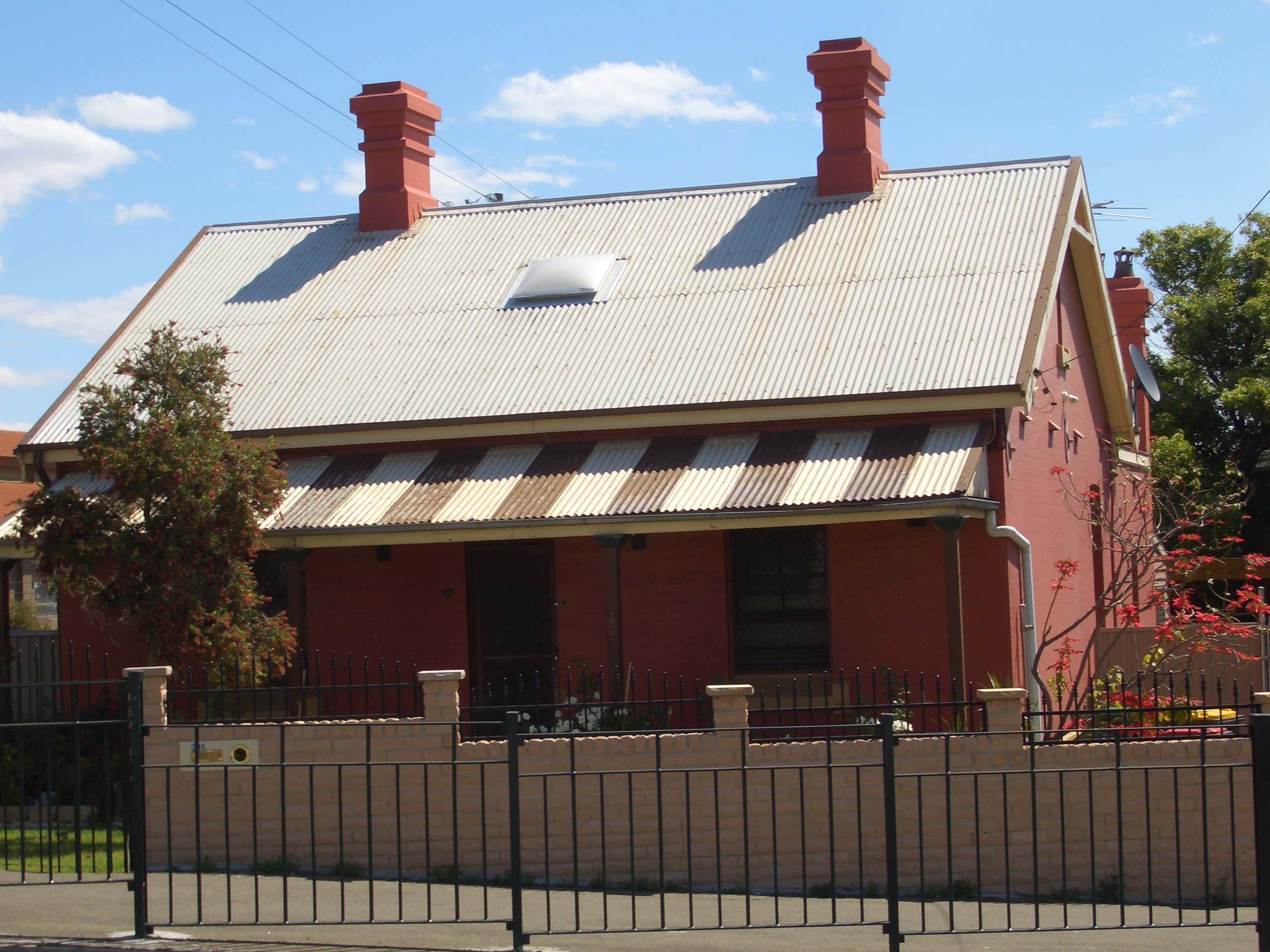
Stationmaster's cottage on Burwood Road

== Transport ==
Belmore railway station is located on the Bankstown railway line. The line was opened in 1895 and electrified in 1926. The station at Belmore opened on 1 February 1895. The station was temporarily closed on 30 September 2024 to allow for the line to be converted to Sydney Metro standards. Once reopened, the station will be serviced by the Metro North West & Bankstown Line.

Belmore has many bus routes navigating to the south, to the north and the inner south west to the Sydney CBD.

== Religious facilities ==
- Lien Hoa Temple, a Vietnamese Buddhist temple
- All Saints Greek Orthodox Church
- St Alban's Anglican Church
- St Joseph's Catholic Church
- Belmore Church of Christ
- Al-Azhar Mosque - Located @ 172B Burwood Rd, Belmore

== Schools ==
- The Heritage Listed Belmore South Public School was officially opened on the 22 January 1917.
- Belmore Boys' High is a small, comprehensive, multicultural high school.
- St Joseph's Primary School is a coeducational K-6 primary school.
- All Saints Grammar School is a co-educational Orthodox Christian School from Pre-Kindergarten to Year 12, run under the auspices of the Greek Orthodox Archdiocese of Australia.

== Gallery ==
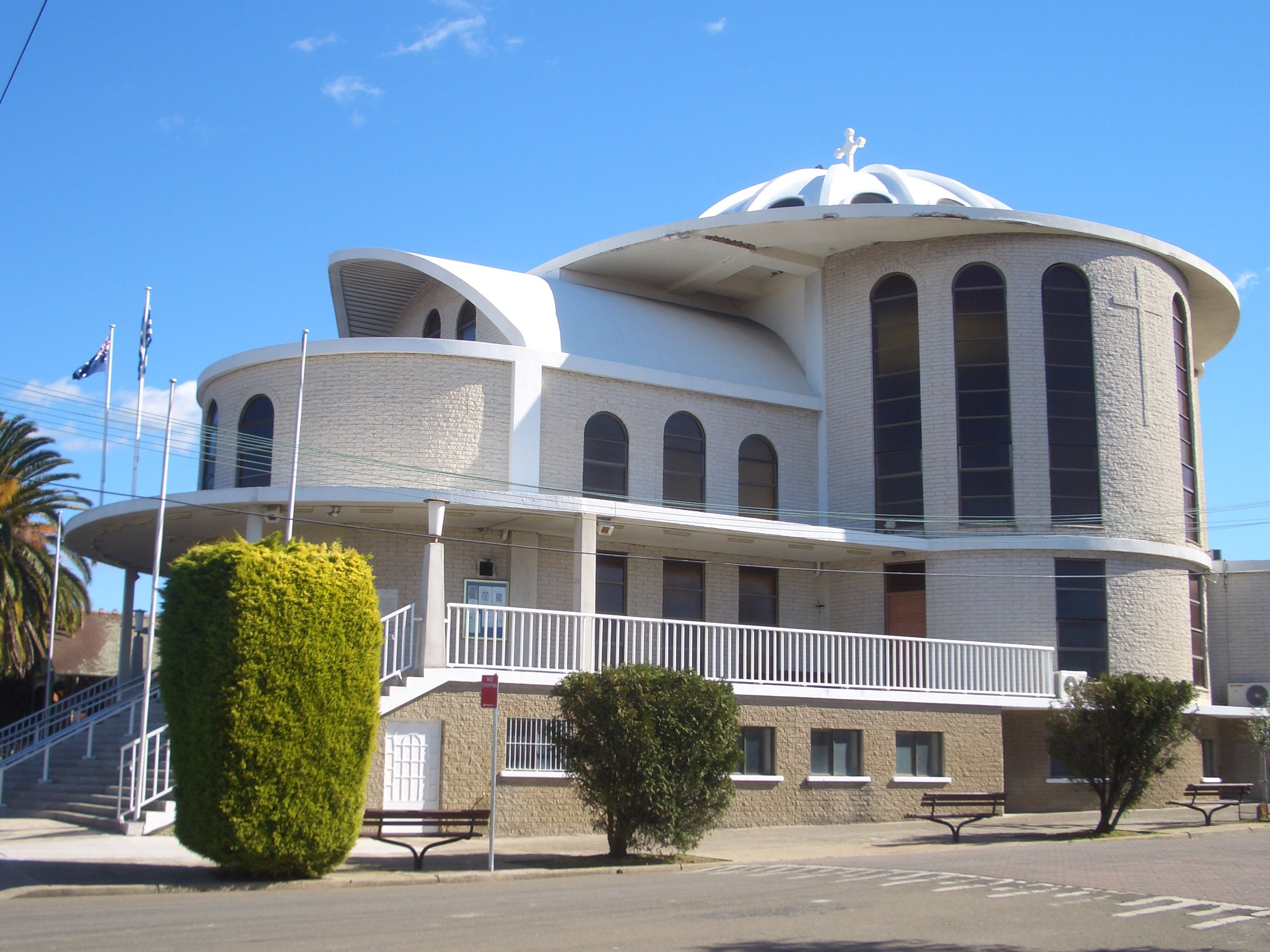
All Saints Greek Orthodox Church

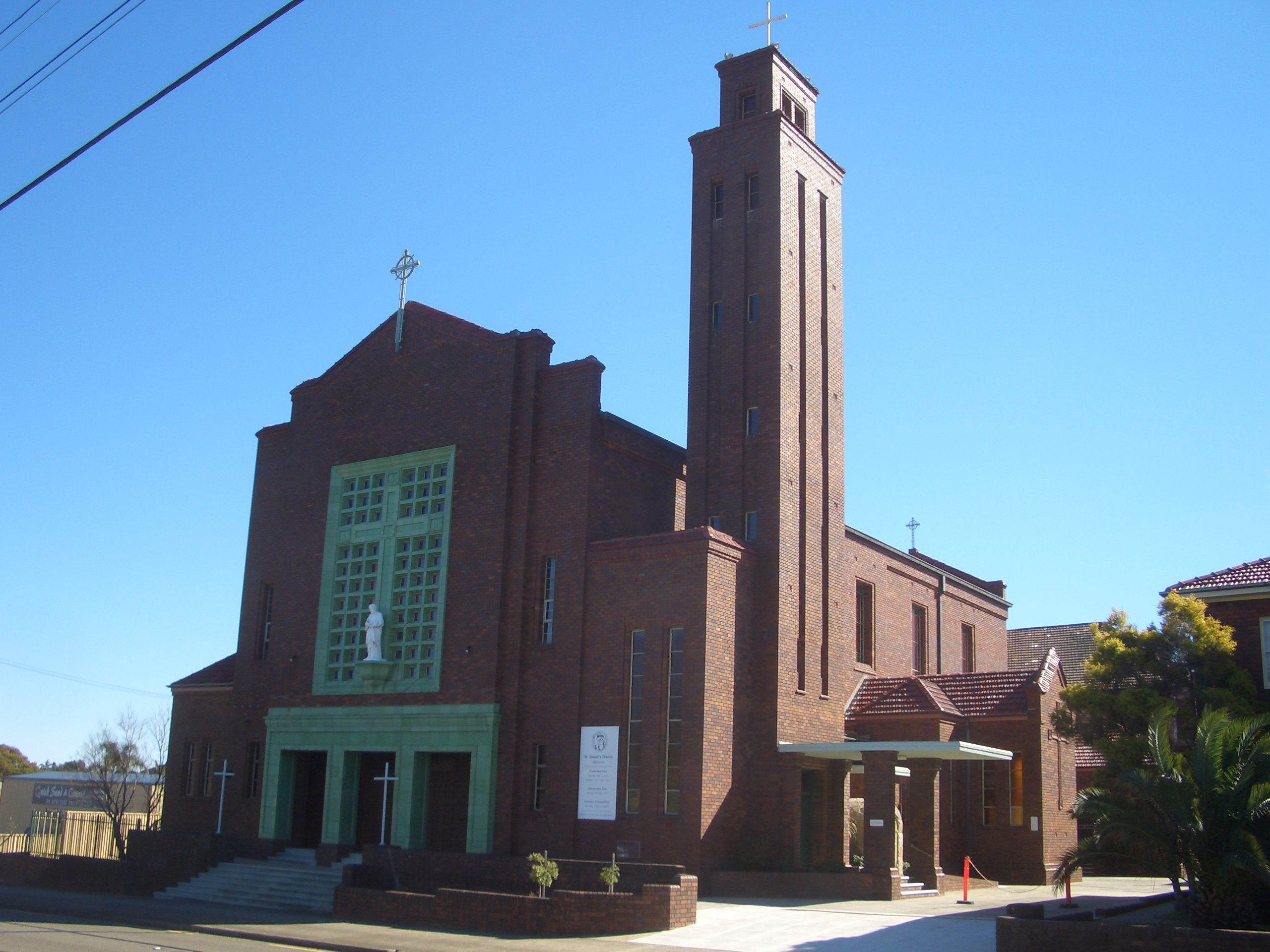
St Joseph's Catholic Church

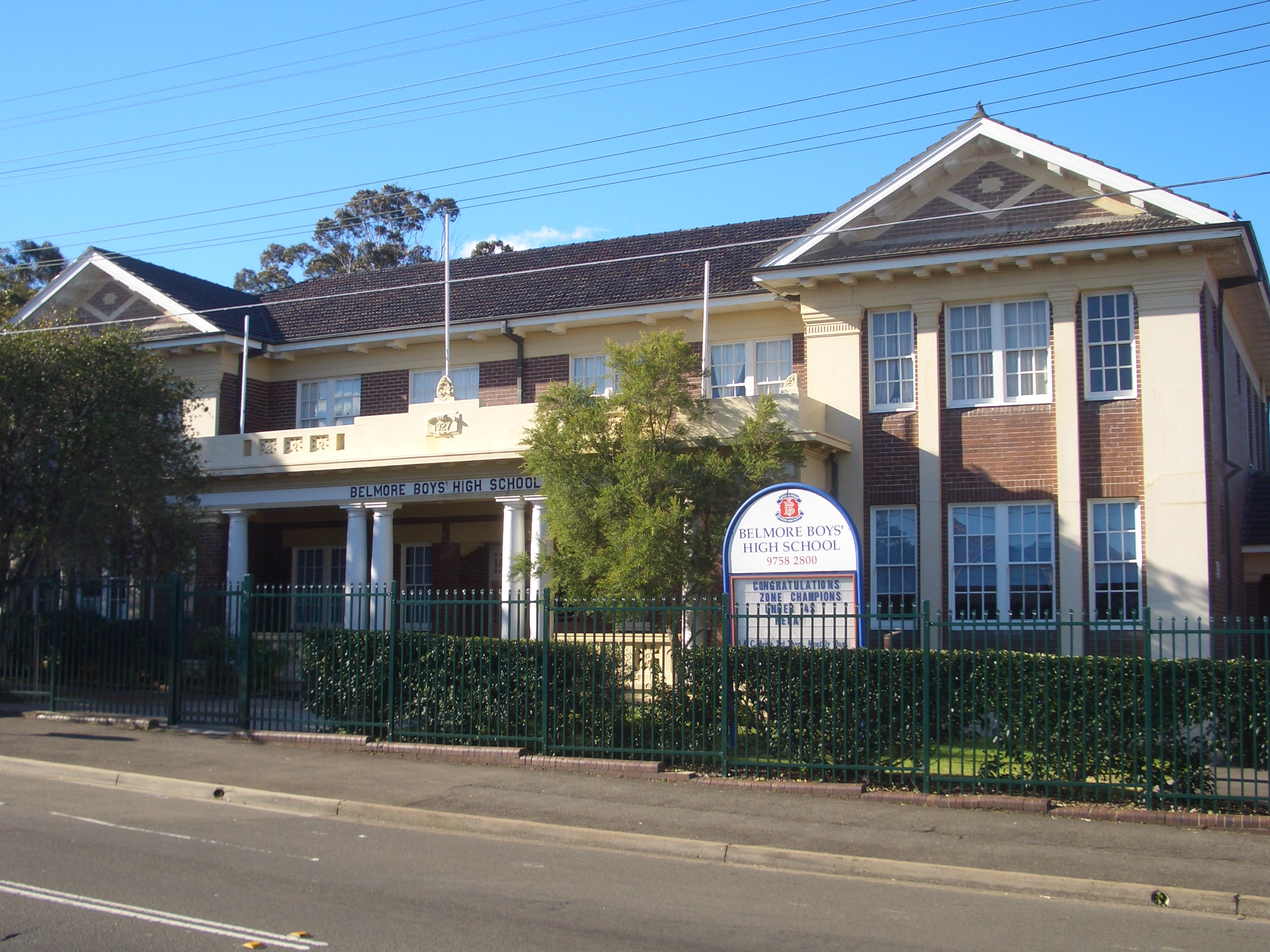
Belmore Boys High School

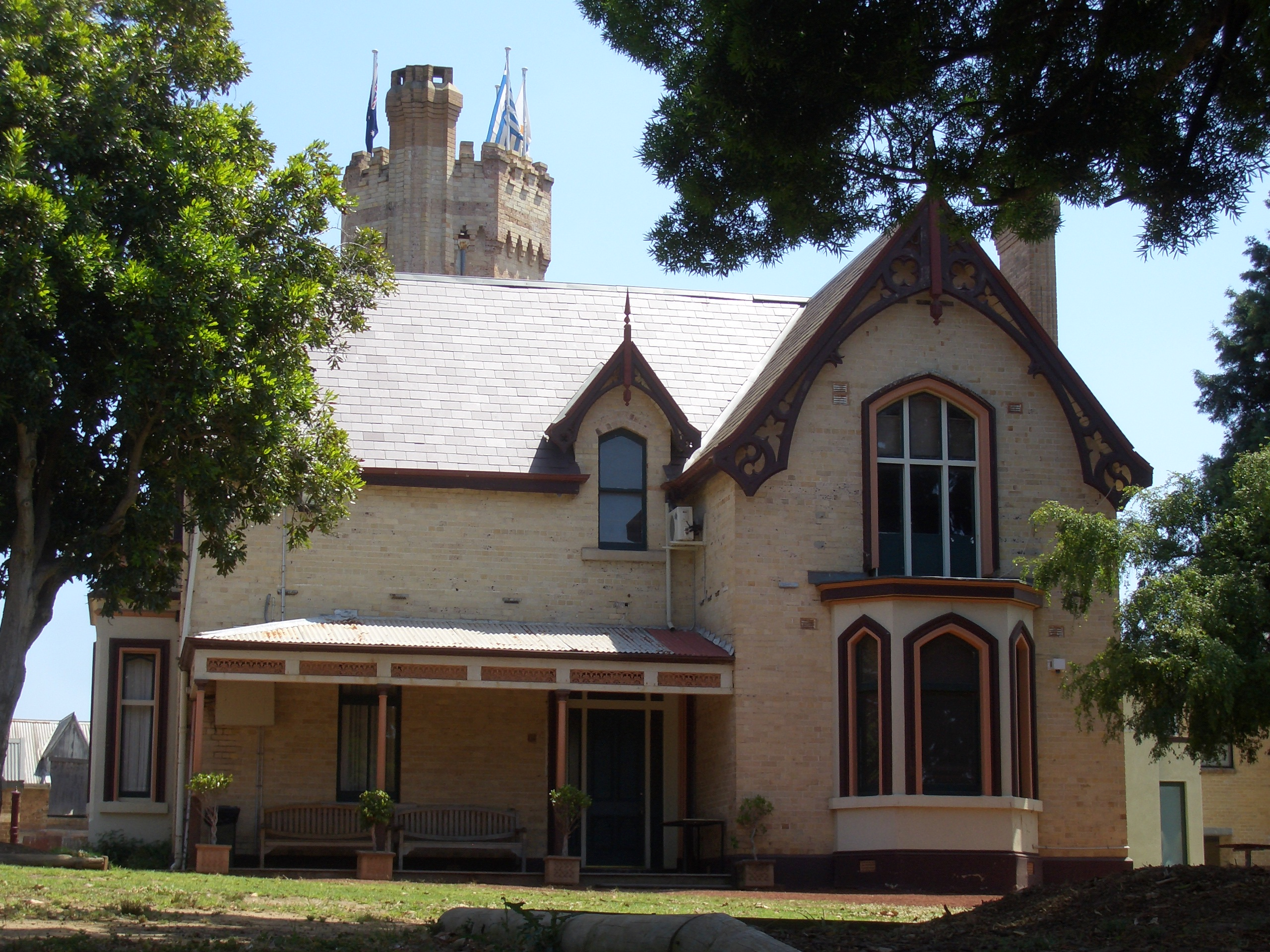
The Towers, a heritage-listed house in Forsyth Street

== Sport ==
Belmore Sports Ground is the home ground of the National Rugby League team Canterbury-Bankstown Bulldogs. It is the current home ground for New South Wales Premier League team Sydney Olympic. The "Back to Belmore" campaign was established in August 2005 to upgrade Belmore Sports Grounds as a top-class sporting facility to NRL standards for the Bulldogs to stage a select number of NRL games at their traditional home ground in the long-term future.

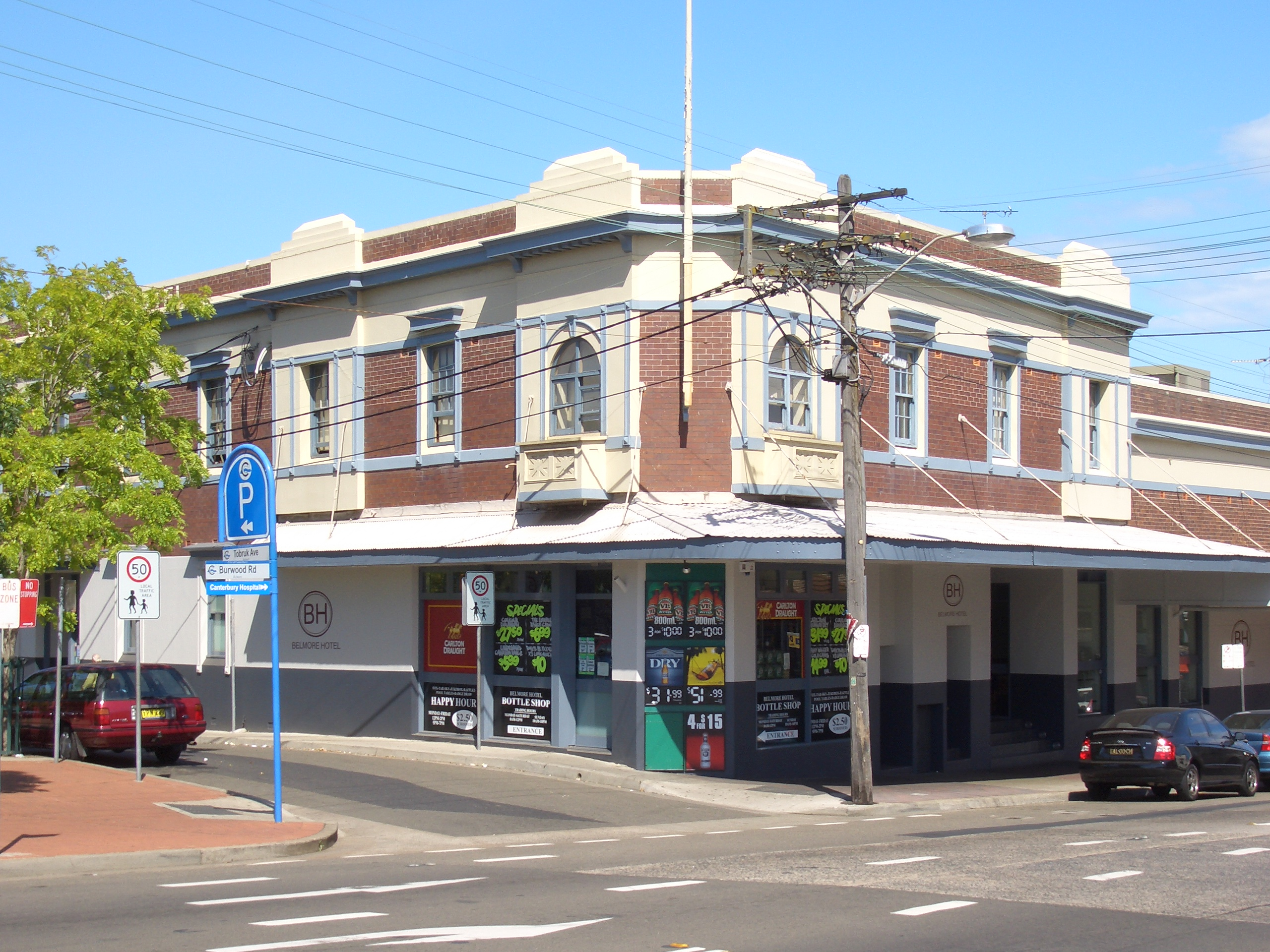
Belmore Hotel

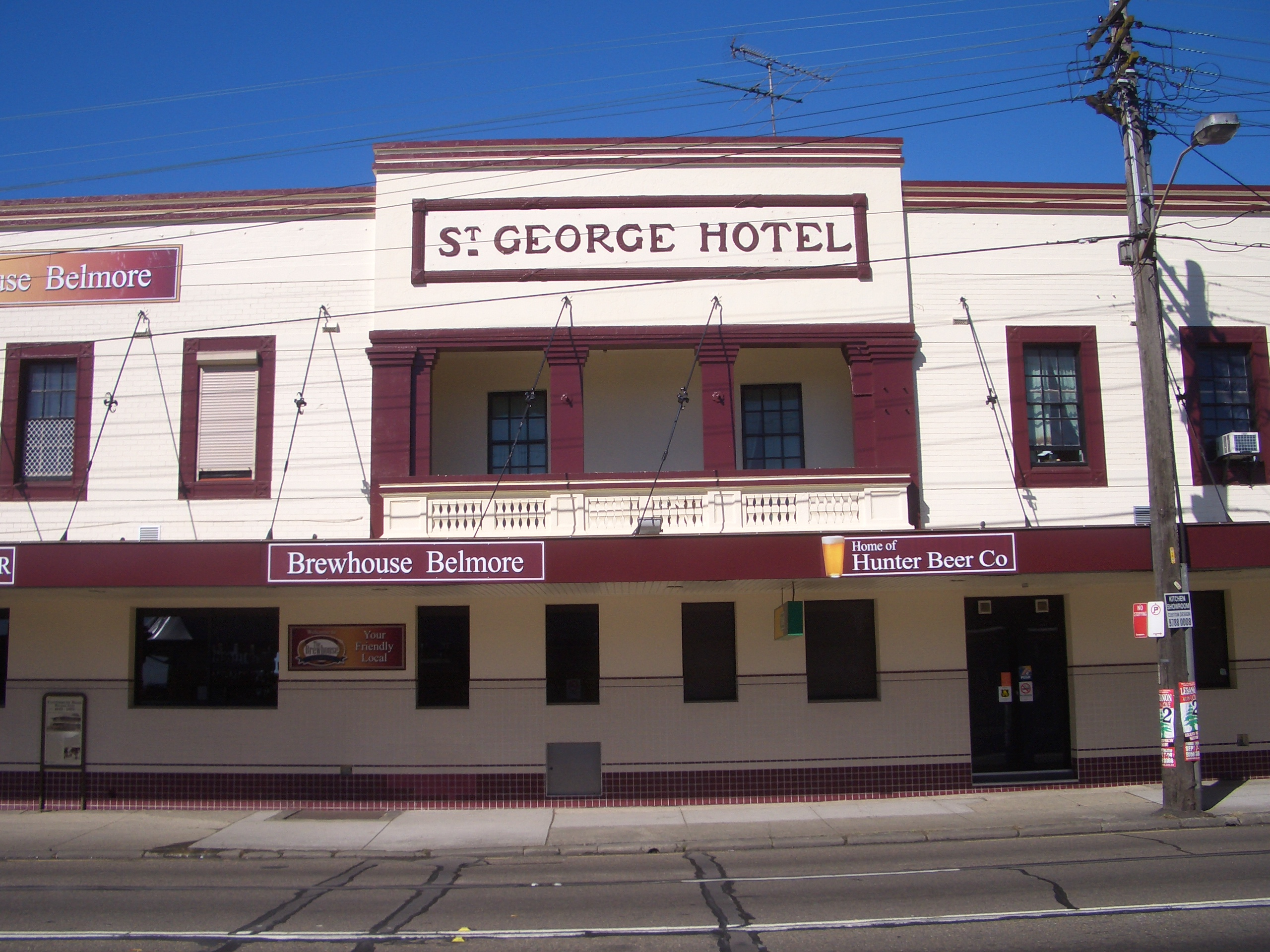
Belmore Brewery, St George Hotel

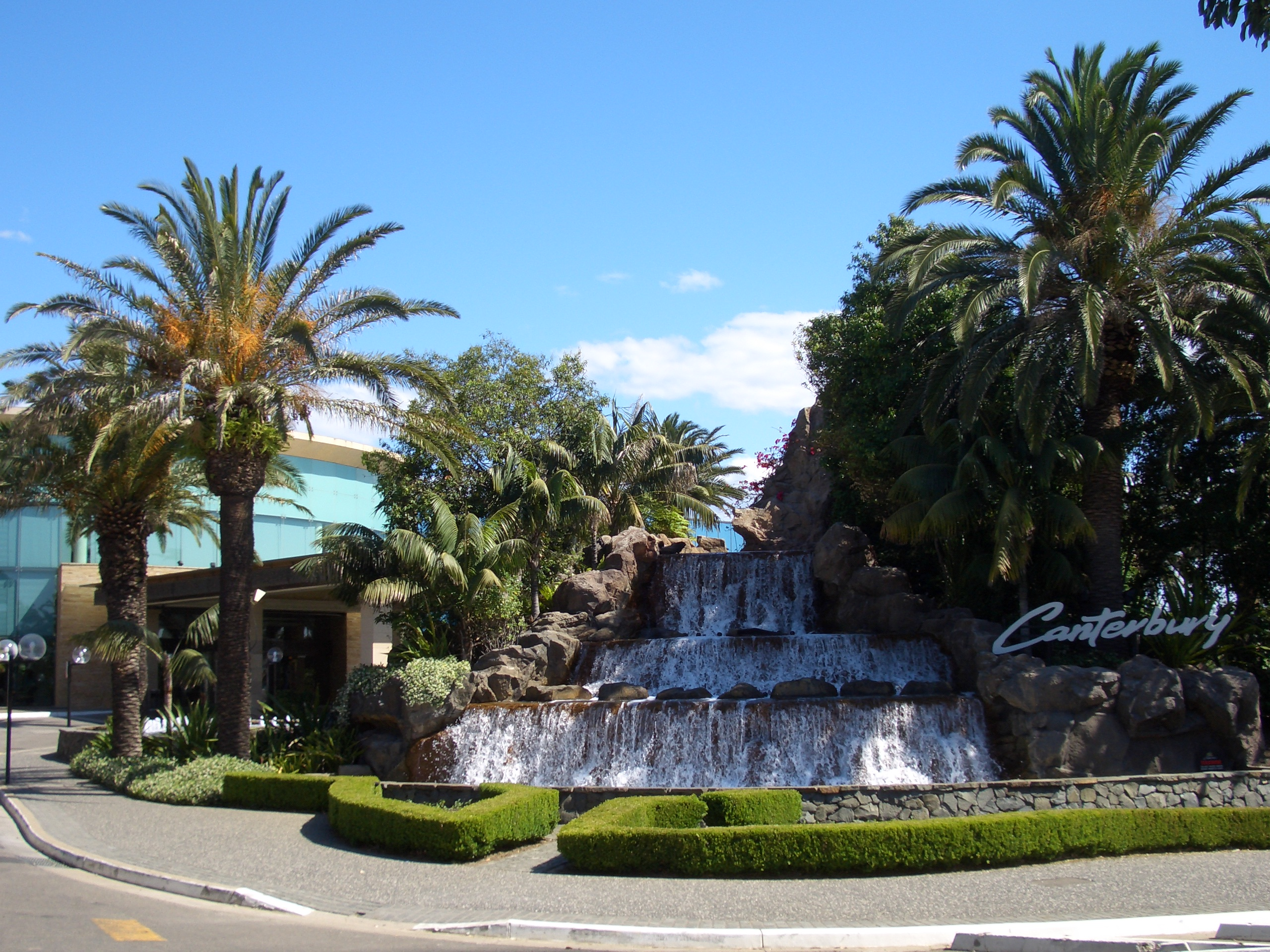
Canterbury Leagues Club

== Demographics ==
According to the 2021 census of population, there were 13,781 residents in Belmore.

- 44.0% of residents were born in Australia, compared with the national average of 66.9%. The next most common countries of birth were Greece 5.9%, China 5.4%, Lebanon 4.4%, Vietnam 3.6% and South Korea 2.3%.
- 28.9% of people only spoke English at home. Other languages spoken at home included Greek 12.4%, Arabic 11.7%, Mandarin 5.0%, Vietnamese 4.6% and Cantonese 3.3%.
- The most common responses for religious affiliation were Catholic 23.6%, Eastern Orthodox 16.9%, No Religion 16.5% and Islam 13.3%.
- The most common ancestries in Belmore were Greek 14.4%, Lebanese 11.3%, Chinese 10.4%, Australian 9.9% and English 8.3%.
