= Lakemba railway station =

Railway station in Sydney, New South Wales

Lakemba
- Platform, November 2026

General information
- Location: Railway Parade, Lakemba; Australia
- Coordinates: 33°55′12″S 151°04′33″E
- Owner: Transport Asset Manager of New South Wales
- Operator: Sydney Trains (until 30 September 2024); Metro Trains Sydney (from 2026)
- Line: Metro North West & Bankstown Line
- Distance: 14.48 kilometres (9.00 mi) from Central
- Platforms: 2 (1 island)
- Tracks: 2
- Connections: Bus

Construction
- Structure type: Ground
- Accessible: Yes

Other information
- Status: Weekdays: Staffed: 6am to 10pm: Weekends and public holidays: Staffed: 6am to 7pm
- Station code: LKM
- Website: Transport for NSW

History
- Opened: 14 April 1909
- Closed: 30 September 2024
- Rebuilt: 30 October 2026

Passengers
- 2023: 1,868,440 (year); 5,119 (daily) (Sydney Trains, NSW TrainLink)

Services
Preceding station	Sydney Metro	Following station
Wiley Park towards Bankstown	M1 Metro North West & Bankstown Line	Belmore towards Tallawong
Former services
Preceding station	Sydney Trains	Following station
Wiley Park towards Lidcombe or Liverpool	Bankstown Line (until 2024)	Belmore towards City Circle
Location

Lakemba railway station is a heritage-listed railway station on the Metro North West & Bankstown Line in the Sydney suburb of Lakemba.

== History ==
Lakemba station opened on 14 April 1909 when the Bankstown line was extended from Belmore to Bankstown.

Previously, a shunting neck existed to the west of the station, allowing services to terminate at Lakemba. This siding was removed in the 1990s. The original wooden ticket office above the station was destroyed by fire and replaced with a modern metal and glass structure. The station received an accessibility upgrade in 2007, which included the installation of a lift.

The station closed on 30 September 2024 to facilitate the conversion of the Bankstown line to Sydney Metro. It reopened on 30 October 2026.

== War memorial ==
A war memorial was opened outside the station on 19 April 1953 by State Governor John Northcott.

== Platforms and services ==
Platform	Line	Stopping pattern	Notes
1	M1 Metro North West & Bankstown Line	services to Tallawong	
2	M1 Metro North West & Bankstown Line	services to Bankstown	

== Transport links ==
U-Go Mobility operates four bus routes via Lakemba station, under contract to Transport for NSW:

- 450: Strathfield to Hurstville station
- 942: Campsie to Lugarno
- 946: Bankstown to Roselands
- S14: to Mount Lewis

Lakemba station is served by one NightRide route:

- N40: East Hills station to Town Hall station
