= Lakemba, New South Wales =

Suburb in Sydney, Australia

Lakemba
- Suburb
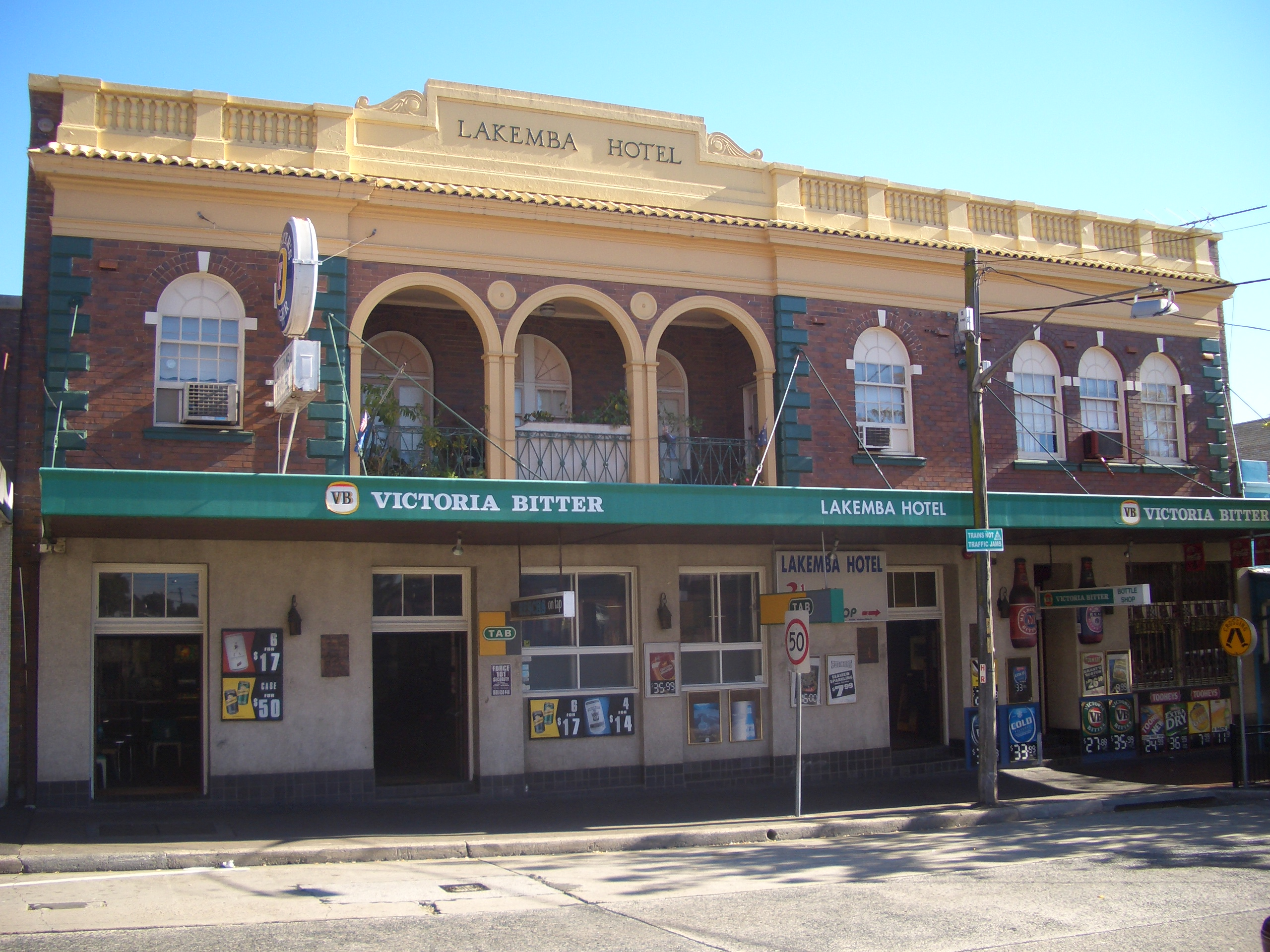
- Lakemba Hotel

- Interactive map of Lakemba
- Coordinates: 33°55′54″S 151°5′7″E
- Country: Australia
- State: New South Wales
- LGA: City of Canterbury-Bankstown
- Location: 12 km (7.5 mi) WSW of Sydney CBD

Government
  - State electorate: Canterbury
  - Federal division: Watson
- Elevation: 38 m (125 ft)

Population
  - Total: 17,092 (2021 census)
- Postcode: 2195
Suburbs around Lakemba
Mount Lewis	Greenacre	Strathfield South
Punchbowl	Lakemba	Belfield
Wiley Park	Roselands	Belmore

Lakemba (/ləkɛmbə/) is a suburb in Western Sydney, in the state of New South Wales, Australia. Lakemba is located 12 kilometres south west of the Sydney central business district, in the local government area of the City of Canterbury-Bankstown.

== Geography ==
Lakemba is in the Cooks River watershed. This river is tidal up to the edge of Lakemba. A bike and walking trail takes walkers and cyclists all the way from nearby Belfield to the east along the Cooks River, to where it flows into Botany Bay. In the opposite direction the bike and walking trail goes north to Olympic Park and Homebush Bay on the Parramatta River.

Canterbury Road winds its way high along the ridge, which is the boundary of the watersheds of Cooks River and Wolli Creek to the south. It is near the shopping centre on Haldon Street.

== History ==
The area was at an early time in its colonial history originally known as Potato Hill because potatoes were cropped there. Land grants by the new colonial government began in Lakemba about 1810. Samuel Hockley was granted 50 acres (200,000 m^{2}), which he called Essex Hill Farm, after his home county in England. The suburb was known as Belmore South until 1910.

Benjamin Taylor had a 22 hectare property in the 1880s. He named his property "Lakeba" (pronounced Lakemba) after the Lakeba island in the Lau Islands group of Fiji, where his second wife's grandparents, Rev and Mrs Cross, were missionaries from 1835. One of the original streets is Oneata Street, named after another small Fijian Island, close to Lakeba. Benjamin Taylor was variously an entomologist, town clerk, Alderman and Mayor of Canterbury Council. The railway line was built to the neighbouring suburb of Belmore in 1895 and extended to Lakemba and beyond, in 1909. The station was built on Benjamin Taylor's property and was named after his 'Lakemba Cottage'.

The first school opened here as Belmore School in April 1869 and became known as Belmore South in September 1907 until it was changed to Lakemba Public School in July 1969. The post office opened on 1 July 1920.

== Demographics ==
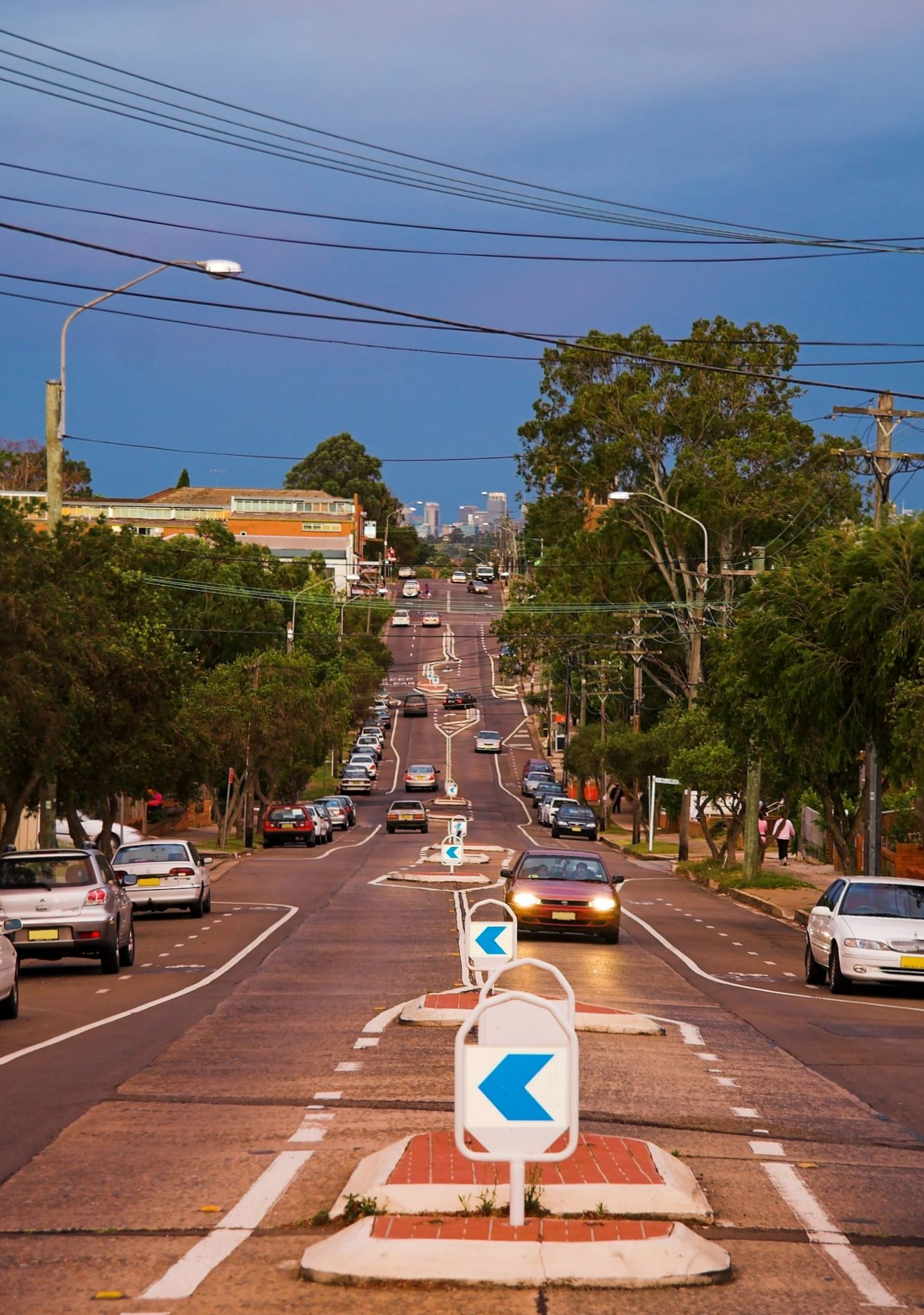
Lakemba Street, view north-east towards the Sydney CBD

In the 2021 Census, there were 17,092 people in Lakemba.

Lakemba has had a diverse demographic history. Like most of the rest of Australia, its first non-Aboriginal inhabitants in the nineteenth century were British and Irish settlers. By the mid-twentieth century, the suburb had absorbed large numbers of Greek and Italian arrivals. Local businesses and clubs reflected this in Mediterranean delicatessens, take-away shops and the Greek Orthodox Club.

From the mid-1970s, Lakemba became very popular with migrants from Lebanon and by the mid-1990s the area was considered a centre of Lebanese Australian life. The founding of the Lakemba Mosque and the establishment of specialised restaurants, take-away shops, grocery shops, clothing and book sellers catering to Arab and Muslim cultural needs has encouraged a general perception of Lakemba as a predominantly Arab and Muslim suburb. However, as of the 2021 census, the ethnic make-up of Lakemba is much more diverse, with only 6.4% of residents identifying as Lebanese by ancestry. The largest group by reported ancestry is instead Bangladeshi.

In 2021, 32.0% of people were born in Australia. The next most common countries of birth were Bangladesh (15.0%), India (8.8%), Pakistan (5.3%), Myanmar (4.3%) and Lebanon (3.4%). The most common reported ancestries were Bangladeshi (14.3%), Indian (10.7%), Australian (8.3%), English (6.8%) and Lebanese (6.4%).

16.6% of people only spoke English at home. Other languages spoken at home included Bengali (18.5%), Urdu (13.2%), Arabic (10.5%), Vietnamese (3.8%) and Rohingya (3.2%).

In the 2021 census, the most common responses for religion were Islam (61.2%), Not stated (10.1%), Catholic (8.8%), No religion (6.7%) and Eastern Orthodox (3.4%).

== Transport ==
Lakemba railway station is located on the Bankstown railway line. The line was extended to Lakemba in 1909 and electrified in 1926. The station was temporarily closed on 30 September 2024 to allow for the line to be converted to Sydney Metro standards as part of the Sydney Metro City & Southwest project. These works are to be completed by 2025, after which Metro North West & Bankstown Line services will run every 4 minutes during peak hour, with travel times between Lakemba and Central decreased from 28 minutes to 22.

For details of bus services see Lakemba station.

== Residential area ==
Lakemba is mentioned heavily in news reports in regards to its affordability compared to the Sydney market being as close to the city as it is. The area was the best performing suburb over the last 10 years from 2020 with further growth expected with the construction of the Sydney Metro City & Southwest which will reduce city travel times and bring new residential and commercial development to the area. Additionally Lakemba receives media coverage as one of the last areas of Sydney where it is cheaper to buy than rent.

== Commercial area ==
Lakemba has many shops, on and around Haldon Street, where a wide range of international and local foods can be purchased. There are also commercial developments along Canterbury Road.

== Lakemba Nights during Ramadan ==
Lakemba Nights during Ramadan takes place on Haldon Street and is a nightly food market in the month of Ramadan. One month a year, people across Australia visit Lakemba for the Lakemba Nights during Ramadan. The popularity of the Ramadan markets and its offerings throughout the year eventually attract thousands of people every week.

== Places of worship ==
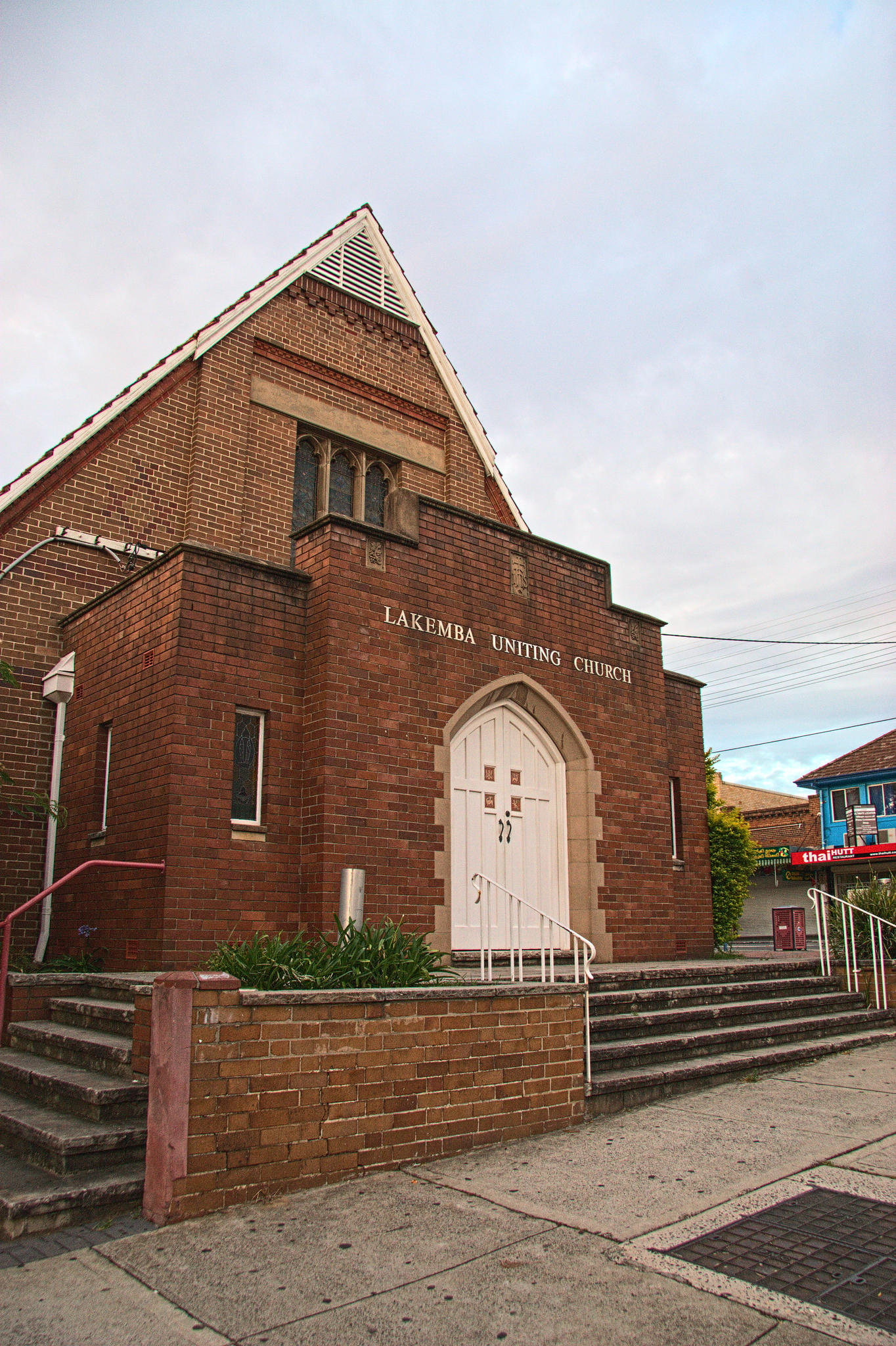
Lakemba Uniting Church, formerly Lakemba Methodist Church

Lakemba has many places of worship to cater for the different religions of its population, including Darul Ulum Sydney, Lakemba Mosque, Ernest Street Masjid, Lakemba Musalla, and Ahl Al Sunna Wal Jamaah Association Musallah and several churches including St Therese Catholic Church, Lakemba Uniting Church, Lakemba Presbyterian Church.

The St. Andrews Anglican Church, located at the corner of Quigg and Lakemba Street, was built in 1923 as a brick building with a significant collection of stained glass windows. The original church was a wooden building, later extended to become the parish hall.

== Schools ==
Lakemba contains multiple private and public schools including:

- Lakemba Public School
- Hampden Park Public School
- Canterbury Vale School
- St Therese Primary School
- Holy Spirit College
- Rissalah College
- AlHikma College

== Politics ==
Lakemba is the name of one of the parliamentary constituencies of New South Wales. The Electoral district of Lakemba is currently occupied by Jihad Dib, from the Australian Labor Party. The Federal Member of Parliament is Tony Burke.
