= Belmore railway station =

Railway station in Sydney, New South Wales, Australia

Belmore
- Westbound view, November 2026

General information
- Location: Burwood Road, Belmore; Australia
- Coordinates: 33°55′02″S 151°05′19″E
- Elevation: 33 metres (108 ft)
- Owner: Transport Asset Manager of New South Wales
- Operator: Sydney Trains (until 30 September 2024); Metro Trains Sydney (from 2026)
- Line: Metro North West & Bankstown Line
- Distance: 13.25 km (8.23 mi) from Central
- Platforms: 2 (1 island)
- Tracks: 2
- Connections: Bus

Construction
- Structure type: Ground
- Accessible: Yes

Other information
- Status: Weekdays: Staffed: 6am to 7pm: Weekends and public holidays: Staffed: 8am to 4pm
- Station code: BMR
- Website: Transport for NSW

History
- Opened: 1 February 1895
- Closed: 30 September 2024
- Rebuilt: 30 October 2026

Passengers
- 2023: 1,087,050 (year); 2,978 (daily) (Sydney Trains, NSW TrainLink)

Services
Preceding station	Sydney Metro	Following station
Lakemba towards Bankstown	M1 Metro North West & Bankstown Line	Campsie towards Tallawong
Former services
Preceding station	Sydney Trains	Following station
Lakemba towards Lidcombe or Liverpool	Bankstown Line (until 2024)	Campsie towards City Circle

New South Wales Heritage Register
- Official name: Belmore Railway Station Group; Burwood Road
- Type: State heritage (built)
- Designated: 2 April 1999
- Reference no.: 1081
- Type: Railway Platform / Station
- Category: Transport – Rail
- Builders: NSW Government Railways
Location

Belmore railway station is a heritage-listed railway station on the Metro North West & Bankstown Line in the Sydney suburb of Belmore.

== History ==
Belmore station opened on 1 February 1895 as the initial terminus of the Bankstown line from Sydenham. Its initial construction name was Burwood Road, but the station was named Belmore on opening.

The station was built when Belmore was still rural. The station layout featured a typical brick station building on an island platform. A station master's residence was also built in 1895 and is still extant at 346 Burwood Road, opposite the station, but is now in private ownership.

The line had its origins in Railway Commissioner Goodchap's 1882 recommendation that an additional line was needed between Newtown and Liverpool to relieve traffic on the Southern Line and to encourage agriculture and suburban settlement. Lobbying by local interests and land speculators achieved Parliamentary approval by 1890 and construction commenced in 1892. The most important stations on the line, Belmore, Canterbury and Marrickville, were built with impressive near-identical brick buildings, the other intermediate stations (Campsie, Dulwich Hill and Hurlstone Park) receiving more modest timber buildings (later replaced), possibly reflecting economies of the depression of the 1890s.

The depression suppressed the profitability of the line and the extension to Liverpool did not proceed. However, suburban development followed in the early twentieth century, particularly during the interwar period when many war service homes were built west of Canterbury. The line was extended to Bankstown in 1909 (and then to Regents Park in 1928, making it part of a loop line through Lidcombe), its justification by then being the servicing of suburban development.

Prior to 1909, there were sidings for the storage of locomotives due to the railway terminating at Belmore. Suburban development intensified post World War I when many War Service homes were built in the area. Sidings at the station were extended during the 1920s for Belmore and Canterbury Councils for the purposes of unloading timber and other material for house construction and municipal works.

In 1925–26, a number of works were undertaken in preparation for electrification of the line including a sub-station and platform extension. The sub-station is now used as a signals training facility.

The overhead timber booking office at Belmore was constructed c.1937 at the top of the steps fronting onto the down side of Burwood Road to take the ticket selling and parcel functions. The change was also made to most other stations built to a similar configuration. The station master's office remained in the platform building for another forty years, but this function too has now moved to the street level building and the platform building remains largely unused.

The station was added to the New South Wales State Heritage Register on 2 April 1999.

In December 2007, an upgrade to the station including a new lift was complete.

The station was closed from 30 September 2024 until 30 October 2026 as part of conversion works for it to run on the Metro North West & Bankstown Line as part of the Sydney Metro.

== Platforms and services ==
Platform	Line	Stopping pattern	Notes
1	M1 Metro North West & Bankstown Line	services to Tallawong	
2	M1 Metro North West & Bankstown Line	services to Bankstown	

== Transport links ==
Transit Systems operates one bus route via Belmore station, under contract to Transport for NSW:

- 415: Chiswick to Campsie station

U-Go Mobility operates one bus route via Belmore station, under contract to Transport for NSW:

- 942: Lugarno to Campsie

Belmore station is served by one NightRide route:

- N40: East Hills station to Town Hall station

== Heritage listing ==
As at 21 July 2009, Belmore Station is of State significance as it was the initial terminus station on the Sydenham to Bankstown Line which had been constructed to relieve congestion on the Main South Line as well as to promote agriculture and suburban growth. The platform building represents the period of transition from the boom time of the 1880s to the standardisation of NSW railway building design of the 1890s onwards and the high level of aesthetic design of pre-1900 standard railway buildings, which included the use of polychromatic brickwork, decorative dentil coursing, ornate awning brackets and carved bargeboards. The building is relatively intact and is representative of a small group of such ornate platform buildings including Canterbury and Marrickville on the Bankstown Line.

Belmore railway station was listed on the New South Wales State Heritage Register on 2 April 1999 having satisfied the following criteria.

The place is important in demonstrating the course, or pattern, of cultural or natural history in New South Wales.

Belmore Railway Station possesses state historical significance as it was the initial terminus station on the Sydenham to Bankstown Line built to relieve the crowding on the Main Southern Line and encourage agriculture and suburban growth in the late 1800s and early 20th century. The brick platform building represents that period which marked the transition from the boom period of the 1880s to the standardisation of NSW railway building design of the 1890s and onwards.

The place is important in demonstrating aesthetic characteristics and/or a high degree of creative or technical achievement in New South Wales.

The platform building at Belmore Station has state aesthetic and technical significance because it demonstrates the particular design and style of brick island buildings erected by the NSW Railways in the pre-1900s and also because of the excellent quality of its aesthetic features such as the polychromatic brickwork, dentilled brick cornice and cement mouldings which distinguish it from other platform building types.

The place has a strong or special association with a particular community or cultural group in New South Wales for social, cultural or spiritual reasons.

The place has the potential to contribute to the local community's sense of place, and can provide a connection to the local community's past.

The place is important in demonstrating the principal characteristics of a class of cultural or natural places/environments in New South Wales.

The station is representative of, and is a fine example of a pre-1900 standard railway station building. It's styling reflected the importance of the station at that time, the other important stations on the Bankstown line with the same design being Canterbury and Marrickville. The overhead booking office is also a representative example of this type of railway building and is largely intact.

== See also ==
- List of Sydney Trains railway stations
