= Mount Lewis, New South Wales =

Mount Lewis
- Suburb
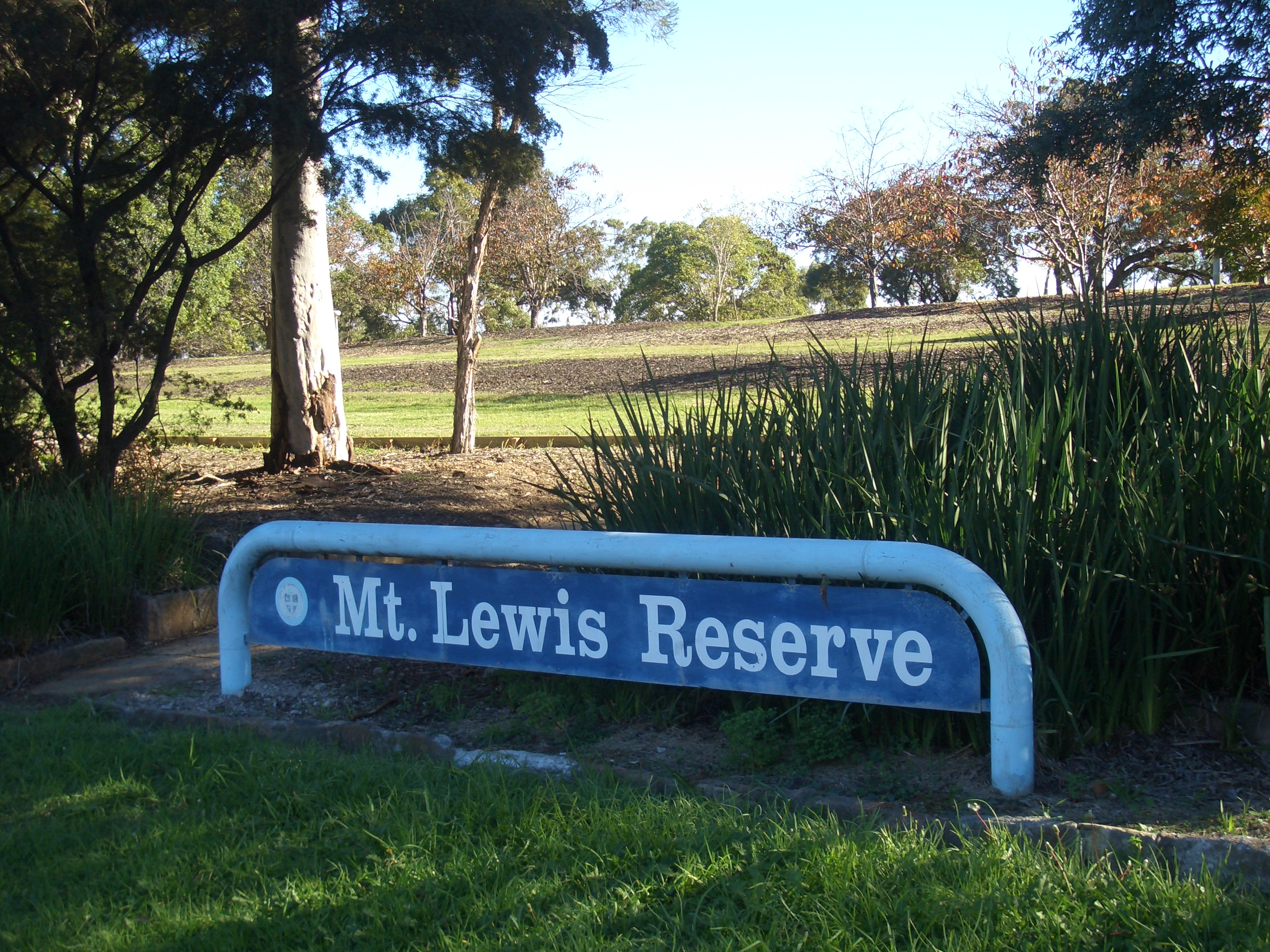
- Mount Lewis Reserve

- Interactive map of Mount Lewis
- Coordinates: 33°54′54″S 151°3′4″E
- Country: Australia
- State: New South Wales
- City: Sydney
- LGA: City of Canterbury-Bankstown
- Location: 18 km (11 mi) SW of Sydney CBD

Government
  - State electorate: Bankstown
  - Federal division: Watson
- Elevation: 60 m (200 ft)

Population
  - Total: 1,234 (2021 census)
- Postcode: 2190
Suburbs around Mount Lewis
| Greenacre | Greenacre | Greenacre |
| Bankstown | Mount Lewis | Punchbowl |
| Bankstown | Punchbowl | Punchbowl |

Mount Lewis is a suburb in South-western Sydney in the state of New South Wales, Australia. It is part of the local government area City of Canterbury-Bankstown, and is located 18 km south-west of the Sydney central business district.

== History ==
Mount Lewis takes its name from the highest point in the district at Mount Lewis Reserve on Wattle Street. The origin of the name is unclear but it reflects the height which provides good views west towards the Bankstown CBD, south towards Canterbury Road and east towards the Sydney CBD skyline. Thomas Collins acquired 50 acres (200,000 m^{2}) of land in 1834–35.

== Commercial area ==
Mount Lewis is a mostly residential suburb with a few shops and commercial developments located on Wattle Street. Mount Lewis Bowling Club is located on Waterloo Road.

== Schools ==
Mount Lewis has an infants school on Noble Avenue. The school is a K-2 school and is part of the Early Action for Success program.
