= Electoral results for the district of Lakemba =

Election results for Lakemba, New South Wales, Australia

Lakemba, an electoral district of the Legislative Assembly in the Australian state of New South Wales, has had one incarnation, from 1927 until the present.

== Members for Lakemba ==
Election	Member	Party
1927	Fred Stanley	Labor
1930	Fred Stanley	Labor
1932	Fred Stanley	Labor (NSW)
1935	Fred Stanley	Labor (NSW)
1938	Fred Stanley	Labor
1941	Fred Stanley	Labor
1944	Fred Stanley	Labor
1947	Fred Stanley	Labor
1950	Stan Wyatt	Labor
1953	Stan Wyatt	Labor
1956	Stan Wyatt	Labor
1959	Stan Wyatt	Labor
1962	Stan Wyatt	Labor
1964 by	Vince Durick	Labor
1965	Vince Durick	Labor
1968	Vince Durick	Labor
1971	Vince Durick	Labor
1973	Vince Durick	Labor
1976	Vince Durick	Labor
1978	Vince Durick	Labor
1981	Vince Durick	Labor
1984	Wes Davoren	Labor
1988	Wes Davoren	Labor
1991	Wes Davoren	Labor
1995	Tony Stewart	Labor
1999	Morris Iemma	Labor
2003	Morris Iemma	Labor
2007	Morris Iemma	Labor
2008 by	Robert Furolo	Labor
2011	Robert Furolo	Labor
2015	Jihad Dib	Labor
2019	Jihad Dib	Labor

== Election results ==
=== Elections in the 2010s ===
==== 2019 ====
2019 New South Wales state election: Lakemba
Party	Candidate	Votes	%	±%
Labor	Jihad Dib	27,528	61.70	+4.40
Liberal	Rashid Bhuiyan	10,031	22.48	+1.76
Christian Democrats	Karl Schubert	3,170	7.11	−5.70
Greens	Emmet de Bhaldraithe	2,041	4.57	−2.91
Keep Sydney Open	Omar Najjar	988	2.21	+2.21
Animal Justice	Dorlene Abou-Haidar	857	1.92	+1.92
Total formal votes		44,615	93.87	−0.60
Informal votes		2,916	6.13	+0.60
Turnout		47,531	86.02	−0.89
Two-party-preferred result
Labor	Jihad Dib	29,245	72.42	+0.86
Liberal	Rashid Bhuiyan	11,136	27.58	−0.86
Labor hold		Swing	+0.86	

==== 2015 ====
2015 New South Wales state election: Lakemba
Party	Candidate	Votes	%	±%
Labor	Jihad Dib	25,638	57.3	+11.1
Liberal	Rashid Bhuiyan	9,271	20.7	−13.1
Christian Democrats	George El-Dahr	5,728	12.8	+8.2
Greens	Chris Garvin	3,348	7.5	+1.9
No Land Tax	Yahya Chehab	757	1.7	+1.7
Total formal votes		44,742	94.5	+1.1
Informal votes		2,624	5.5	−1.1
Turnout		47,366	86.9	+2.5
Two-party-preferred result
Labor	Jihad Dib	27,338	71.6	+14.2
Liberal	Rashid Bhuiyan	10,864	28.4	−14.2
Labor hold		Swing	+14.2	

==== 2011 ====
2011 New South Wales state election: Lakemba
Party	Candidate	Votes	%	±%
Labor	Robert Furolo	21,595	48.6	−25.3
Liberal	Michael Hawatt	16,333	36.8	+23.6
Greens	Linda Eisler	3,374	7.6	+3.7
Christian Democrats	Sungjae Kam	1,998	4.5	+0.5
Social Justice Network	Omar Quiader	1,133	2.5	+2.5
Total formal votes		44,433	94.8	−0.9
Informal votes		2,419	5.2	+0.9
Turnout		46,852	90.8	
Two-party-preferred result
Labor	Robert Furolo	22,983	57.0	−27.0
Liberal	Michael Hawatt	17,337	43.0	+27.0
Labor hold		Swing	−27.0	

=== Elections in the 2000s ===
==== 2008 by-election ====
2008 Lakemba by-election Saturday 18 October
Party	Candidate	Votes	%	±%
Labor	Robert Furolo	23,004	58.2	−15.7
Liberal	Michael Hawatt	9,354	23.66	+10.5
Greens	Kristian Bolwell	4,847	12.3	+8.4
Christian Democrats	Allan Lotfizadeh	1,292	3.3	(Note: The combined Christian Democrats vote was 4.5 percent, an increase of 0.5 percentage points.)
	Robert Aiken	564	1.4	+1.4
Christian Democrats	Zarif Abdulla	479	1.2	
Total formal votes		39,540	96.1	+0.3
Informal votes		1,696	3.9	−0.3
Turnout		41,236	80.4	−11.75
Two-party-preferred result
Labor	Robert Furolo	24,308	70.5	−13.5
Liberal	Michael Hawatt	10,173	29.5	+13.5
Labor hold		Swing	−13.5	

==== 2007 ====
2007 New South Wales state election: Lakemba
Party	Candidate	Votes	%	±%
Labor	Morris Iemma	31,907	73.9	+9.1
Liberal	Morris Mansour	5,698	13.2	−2.8
Christian Democrats	Josephine Sammut	1,716	4.0	+1.3
Greens	Bashir Sawalha	1,671	3.9	−3.0
Unity	Omar Moussa	1,476	3.4	−1.1
Democrats	Garry Dalrymple	473	1.1	+0.9
	Joanne Kuniansky	237	0.5	+0.5
Total formal votes		43,178	95.8	+0.3
Informal votes		1,902	4.2	−0.3
Turnout		45,080	92.2	
Two-party-preferred result
Labor	Morris Iemma	33,596	84.0	+5.2
Liberal	Morris Mansour	6,415	16.0	−5.2
Labor hold		Swing	+5.2	

==== 2003 ====
2003 New South Wales state election: Lakemba
Party	Candidate	Votes	%	±%
Labor	Morris Iemma	24,060	64.2	+1.0
Liberal	Daniel Try	6,503	17.4	+0.4
Greens	Bashir Sawalha	2,499	6.7	+6.7
Unity	Gengxing Chen	1,640	4.4	+4.4
Independent	Gregory Briscoe-Hough	1,167	3.1	+3.1
Christian Democrats	Zarif Abdulla	1,055	2.8	+2.8
Legal System Reform	Mary Habib	344	0.9	+0.9
	Robert Aiken	204	0.5	+0.5
Total formal votes		37,472	95.9	−0.5
Informal votes		1,621	4.1	+0.5
Turnout		39,093	91.1	
Two-party-preferred result
Labor	Morris Iemma	25,734	77.4	+2.7
Liberal	Daniel Try	7,493	22.6	−2.7
Labor hold		Swing	+2.7	

=== Elections in the 1990s ===
==== 1999 ====
1999 New South Wales state election: Lakemba
Party	Candidate	Votes	%	±%
Labor	Morris Iemma	24,457	63.2	+4.5
Liberal	Michael Hawatt	6,588	17.0	−14.7
Independent	Barbara Coorey	3,896	10.1	+10.1
One Nation	Hussein Abou-Ghaida	1,487	3.8	+3.8
Democrats	Richard Newman	1,181	3.1	+0.7
Against Further Immigration	Tom Moody	1,079	2.8	+2.8
Total formal votes		38,688	96.4	+3.8
Informal votes		1,463	3.6	−3.8
Turnout		40,151	92.4	
Two-party-preferred result
Labor	Morris Iemma	26,536	74.7	+10.0
Liberal	Michael Hawatt	8,998	25.3	−10.0
Labor hold		Swing	+10.0	

==== 1995 ====
1995 New South Wales state election: Lakemba
Party	Candidate	Votes	%	±%
Labor	Tony Stewart	19,115	58.4	+6.8
Liberal	Michael Hawatt	8,480	25.9	−6.1
Independent	John Gorrie	3,468	10.6	+10.6
Democrats	Amelia Newman	1,644	5.0	−3.6
Total formal votes		32,707	91.3	+7.1
Informal votes		3,135	8.7	−7.1
Turnout		35,842	92.8	
Two-party-preferred result
Labor	Tony Stewart	20,448	68.7	+9.3
Liberal	Michael Hawatt	9,304	31.3	−9.3
Labor hold		Swing	+9.3	

==== 1991 ====
1991 New South Wales state election: Lakemba
Party	Candidate	Votes	%	±%
Labor	Wes Davoren	15,110	51.6	+3.4
Liberal	Karl Tartak	9,369	32.0	−0.4
Democrats	Amelia Newman	2,513	8.6	+8.6
Independent	Michael Hawatt	2,264	7.7	+7.7
Total formal votes		29,256	84.2	−10.4
Informal votes		5,499	15.8	+10.4
Turnout		34,755	92.7	
Two-party-preferred result
Labor	Wes Davoren	16,506	59.4	+2.1
Liberal	Karl Tartak	11,267	40.6	−2.1
Labor hold		Swing	+2.1	

=== Elections in the 1980s ===
==== 1988 ====
1988 New South Wales state election: Lakemba
Party	Candidate	Votes	%	±%
Labor	Wes Davoren	12,041	43.9	−17.0
Liberal	Robert Batton	10,301	37.6	−1.4
Call to Australia	Murray Peterson	1,902	6.9	+6.9
Independent	Mohamed Arja	1,545	5.6	+5.6
Independent EFF	Mohamed El Sadik	1,058	3.9	+3.9
Independent	Saleh Almaleh	564	2.1	+2.1
Total formal votes		27,411	93.5	−2.2
Informal votes		1,895	6.5	+2.2
Turnout		29,306	92.6	
Two-party-preferred result
Labor	Wes Davoren	13,173	52.6	−8.4
Liberal	Robert Batton	11,860	47.4	+8.4
Labor hold		Swing	−8.4	

==== 1984 ====
1984 New South Wales state election: Lakemba
Party	Candidate	Votes	%	±%
Labor	Wes Davoren	16,398	61.8	−16.8
Liberal	Stephen Law	10,125	38.2	+16.8
Total formal votes		26,523	95.7	+0.3
Informal votes		1,190	4.3	−0.3
Turnout		27,713	91.6	+1.0
Labor hold		Swing	−16.8	

==== 1981 ====
1981 New South Wales state election: Lakemba
Party	Candidate	Votes	%	±%
Labor	Vince Durick	20,657	78.6	+3.7
Liberal	Vivian Salama	5,635	21.4	0.0
Total formal votes		26,292	95.4	
Informal votes		1,265	4.6	
Turnout		27,557	90.6	
Labor hold		Swing	+1.6	

=== Elections in the 1970s ===
==== 1978 ====
1978 New South Wales state election: Lakemba
Party	Candidate	Votes	%	±%
Labor	Vince Durick	23,463	74.9	+15.1
Liberal	Robin Graham	6,689	21.4	−12.3
Democrats	Brenda Adams	1,155	3.7	+3.7
Total formal votes		31,307	97.1	−0.9
Informal votes		938	2.9	+0.9
Turnout		32,245	93.1	−2.0
Two-party-preferred result
Labor	Vince Durick	23,805	77.0	+12.3
Liberal	Robin Graham	7,100	23.0	−12.3
Labor hold		Swing	+12.3	

==== 1976 ====
1976 New South Wales state election: Lakemba
Party	Candidate	Votes	%	±%
Labor	Vince Durick	19,518	59.8	+2.9
Liberal	Robin Graham	11,008	33.7	−3.2
Independent	Donald Carruthers	1,137	3.5	+3.5
Australia	Timothy Dein	976	3.0	+3.0
Total formal votes		32,639	98.0	+1.5
Informal votes		670	2.0	−1.5
Turnout		33,309	95.1	+2.8
Two-party-preferred result
Labor	Vince Durick	21,118	64.7	+5.0
Liberal	Robin Graham	11,521	35.3	−5.0
Labor hold		Swing	+5.0	

==== 1973 ====
1973 New South Wales state election: Lakemba
Party	Candidate	Votes	%	±%
Labor	Vince Durick	17,464	56.9	−2.5
Liberal	Philip Gregory	11,313	36.9	−3.7
Independent	Douglas Morgan	1,145	3.7	+3.7
Democratic Labor	Anthony Hook	769	2.5	+2.5
Total formal votes		30,691	96.5	
Informal votes		1,110	3.5	
Turnout		31,801	92.3	
Two-party-preferred result
Labor	Vince Durick	18,323	59.7	+0.3
Liberal	Philip Gregory	12,368	40.3	−0.3
Labor hold		Swing	+0.3	

=== Elections in the 1960s ===
==== 1968 ====
1968 New South Wales state election: Lakemba
Party	Candidate	Votes	%	±%
Labor	Vince Durick	13,723	52.3	−4.4
Liberal	Malcolm Broun	9,722	37.0	−6.3
Independent	Lancelot Hutchinson	1,436	5.5	+5.5
Democratic Labor	Annette Andrew	1,146	4.4	+4.4
Independent	Francis Ball	218	0.8	+0.8
Total formal votes		26,245	96.6	
Informal votes		913	3.4	
Turnout		27,158	95.1	
Two-party-preferred result
Labor	Vince Durick	15,123	57.6	+0.9
Liberal	Malcolm Broun	11,122	42.4	−0.9
Labor hold		Swing	+0.9	

==== 1965 ====
1965 New South Wales state election: Lakemba
Party	Candidate	Votes	%	±%
Labor	Vince Durick	14,240	56.7	−3.8
Liberal	Arthur Parry	10,865	43.3	+6.5
Total formal votes		25,105	98.4	−0.3
Informal votes		401	1.6	+0.3
Turnout		25,506	95.1	+0.3
Labor hold		Swing	−5.9	

==== 1964 by-election ====
1964 Lakemba by-election Saturday 19 September
Party	Candidate	Votes	%	±%
Labor	Vince Durick	12,663	56.2	−4.3
Liberal	Arthur Parry	9,283	41.2	+4.4
Independent	Francis Ball	594	2.6	
Total formal votes		22,540	98.3	−0.4
Informal votes		398	1.7	+0.4
Turnout		22,938	85.7	−9.1
Labor hold		Swing		

Stan Wyatt (Labor) died.

==== 1962 ====
1962 New South Wales state election: Lakemba
Party	Candidate	Votes	%	±%
Labor	Stan Wyatt	15,454	60.5	−3.5
Liberal	Russell Carter	9,415	36.8	+0.8
Communist	Stanley Rust	682	2.7	+2.7
Total formal votes		25,551	98.7	
Informal votes		324	1.3	
Turnout		25,875	94.8	
Two-party-preferred result
Labor	Stan Wyatt	16,000	62.6	−1.4
Liberal	Russell Carter	9,551	37.4	+1.4
Labor hold		Swing	−1.4	

=== Elections in the 1950s ===
==== 1959 ====
1959 New South Wales state election: Lakemba
Party	Candidate	Votes	%	±%
Labor	Stan Wyatt	15,510	64.0	
Liberal	Dora Skelsey	8,737	36.0	
Total formal votes		24,247	98.2	
Informal votes		448	1.8	
Turnout		24,695	95.2	
Labor hold		Swing		

==== 1956 ====
1956 New South Wales state election: Lakemba
Party	Candidate	Votes	%	±%
Labor	Stan Wyatt	13,874	60.2	−8.6
Liberal	John Whelan	7,818	33.9	+2.7
Communist	James Staples	1,365	5.9	+5.9
Total formal votes		23,057	98.2	−0.2
Informal votes		416	1.8	+0.2
Turnout		23,473	94.8	+0.3
Two-party-preferred result
Labor	Stan Wyatt	15,102	65.5	−3.3
Liberal	John Whelan	7,955	34.5	+3.3
Labor hold		Swing	−3.3	

==== 1953 ====
1953 New South Wales state election: Lakemba
Party	Candidate	Votes	%	±%
Labor	Stan Wyatt	15,008	68.8	
Liberal	George Chambers	6,813	31.2	
Total formal votes		21,821	98.4	
Informal votes		357	1.6	
Turnout		22,178	94.5	
Labor hold		Swing		

==== 1950 ====
1950 New South Wales state election: Lakemba
Party	Candidate	Votes	%	±%
Labor	Stan Wyatt	6,527	33.3	
Liberal	Samuel Warren	6,353	32.4	
Independent Labor	Fred Stanley	6,032	30.8	
Communist	Roy Boyd	678	3.5	
Total formal votes		19,590	97.8	
Informal votes		443	2.2	
Turnout		20,033	93.8	
Two-party-preferred result
Labor	Stan Wyatt	11,139	56.9	
Liberal	Samuel Warren	8,451	43.1	
Labor hold		Swing		

The sitting member was Fred Stanley who had been elected as a Labor candidate, however he was disendorsed as a result of voting in the election for the Legislative Council and stood as an Independent labor candidate.

=== Elections in the 1940s ===
==== 1947 ====
1947 New South Wales state election: Lakemba
Party	Candidate	Votes	%	±%
Labor	Fred Stanley	14,376	55.3	+13.2
Independent	William Dowe	5,711	22.0	+22.0
Independent	Harry Robson	3,919	15.1	+15.1
Communist	Adam Ogston	1,974	7.6	−9.8
Total formal votes		25,980	97.9	+0.6
Informal votes		546	2.1	−0.6
Turnout		26,526	95.3	+1.8
Labor hold		Swing	N/A	

- Preferences were not distributed.

==== 1944 ====
1944 New South Wales state election: Lakemba
Party	Candidate	Votes	%	±%
Labor	Fred Stanley	9,281	42.1	−29.0
Communist	Adam Ogston	4,668	21.3	+21.3
Democratic	William Crook	4,200	19.2	+19.2
Lang Labor	Henry Mulcahy	3,798	17.4	+17.4
Total formal votes		21,884	97.3	+1.5
Informal votes		600	2.7	−1.5
Turnout		22,484	93.5	−0.4
After distribution of preferences
Labor	Fred Stanley	11,857	54.2	
Communist	Adam Ogston	5,337	24.4	
Democratic	William Crook	4,690	21.4	
Labor hold		Swing	N/A	

- Preferences were not distributed to completion.

==== 1941 ====
1941 New South Wales state election: Lakemba
Party	Candidate	Votes	%	±%
Labor	Fred Stanley	14,390	71.1	
New Social Order	William Dowe	3,321	16.4	
State Labor	Asa North	2,532	12.5	
Total formal votes		20,243	95.8	
Informal votes		882	4.2	
Turnout		21,125	93.9	
Labor hold		Swing		

- Preferences were not distributed.

=== Elections in the 1930s ===
==== 1938 ====
1938 New South Wales state election: Lakemba
Party	Candidate	Votes	%	±%
Labor	Fred Stanley	11,796	61.9	+5.1
Independent	William Dowe	7,276	38.1	+38.1
Total formal votes		19,072	96.6	−1.3
Informal votes		672	3.4	+1.3
Turnout		19,744	97.0	−0.1
Labor hold		Swing	N/A	

==== 1935 ====
1935 New South Wales state election: Lakemba
Party	Candidate	Votes	%	±%
Labor (NSW)	Fred Stanley	10,276	56.8	+7.6
United Australia	Roland Murray	7,049	39.0	−2.8
Independent	John Stewart	753	4.2	+4.2
Total formal votes		18,078	97.9	−0.4
Informal votes		390	2.1	+0.4
Turnout		18,468	97.1	+0.6
Labor (NSW) hold		Swing	N/A	

- Preferences were not distributed.

==== 1932 ====
1932 New South Wales state election: Lakemba
Party	Candidate	Votes	%	±%
Labor (NSW)	Fred Stanley	8,667	49.2	−19.6
United Australia	Robert Uebel	7,374	41.8	+15.6
Federal Labor	John McCallum	1,431	8.1	+8.1
Communist	John Terry	151	0.9	+0.1
Total formal votes		17,623	98.3	+1.2
Informal votes		306	1.7	−1.2
Turnout		17,929	96.5	−2.3
Two-party-preferred result
Labor (NSW)	Fred Stanley	9,401	53.4	
United Australia	Robert Uebel	8,222	46.6	
Labor (NSW) hold		Swing		

==== 1930 ====
1930 New South Wales state election: Lakemba
Party	Candidate	Votes	%	±%
Labor	Fred Stanley	11,861	68.8	
Nationalist	George Cann	4,517	26.2	
Australian	James Johnston	734	4.3	
Communist	Norman Jeffery	140	0.8	
Total formal votes		17,252	97.1	
Informal votes		512	2.9	
Turnout		17,764	98.8	
Labor hold		Swing		

=== Elections in the 1920s ===
==== 1927 ====
1927 New South Wales state election: Lakemba
Party	Candidate	Votes	%	±%
Labor	Fred Stanley	7,498	47.9	
Nationalist	John Scott	5,976	38.2	
Independent Labor	George Cann (defeated)	2,174	13.9	
Total formal votes		15,648	98.6	
Informal votes		216	1.4	
Turnout		15,864	88.9	
Two-party-preferred result
Labor	Fred Stanley	8,005	54.5	
Nationalist	John Scott	6,674	45.5	
Labor win		(new seat)		
