= Iemma (surname) =

Iemma is a surname. Notable people with the surname include:

- Clara Iemma (born 1998), Australian cricketer
- Julio Iemma (born 1948), Venezuelan sports shooter
- Julio César Iemma (born 1954), Argentine sports shooter
- Morris Iemma (born 1961), 40th Premier of New South Wales from 3 August 2005 to 5 September 2008
  - First Iemma ministry, 89th ministry of the Government of New South Wales
  - Second Iemma ministry, 90th ministry of the Government of New South Wales
