= 1964 Lakemba state by-election =

Election for the New South Wales Legislative Assembly seat of Lakemba

A by-election was held for the New South Wales Legislative Assembly seat of Lakemba on 19 September 1964. It was triggered by the death of Stan Wyatt (Labor).

== Dates ==
Date	Event
26 July 1964	Death of Stan Wyatt.
26 August 1964	Writ of election issued by the Speaker of the Legislative Assembly.
1 September 1964	Date of nomination
19 September 1964	Polling day
23 October 1964	Return of writ

== Results ==
1964 Lakemba by-election Saturday 19 September
Party	Candidate	Votes	%	±%
Labor	Vince Durick	12,663	56.2	−4.3
Liberal	Arthur Parry	9,283	41.2	+4.4
Independent	Francis Ball	594	2.6	
Total formal votes		22,540	98.3	−0.4
Informal votes		398	1.7	+0.4
Turnout		22,938	85.7	−9.1
Labor hold		Swing		

== See also ==
- Electoral results for the district of Lakemba
- List of New South Wales state by-elections
