= 2008 Lakemba state by-election =

Election result for Lakemba, New South Wales, Australia

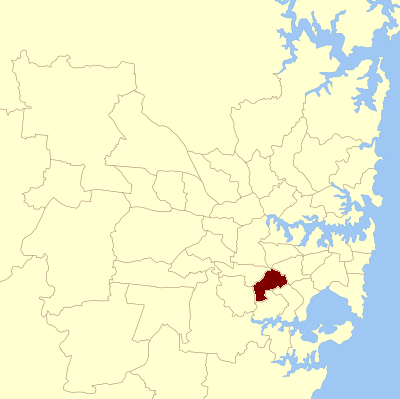
Location in New South Wales

A by-election was held for the New South Wales Legislative Assembly seat of Lakemba on 18 October 2008 after former Premier Morris Iemma resigned as member for Lakemba. By-elections for the seats of Cabramatta, Port Macquarie and Ryde were held on the same day.

The seat was retained by the Labor Party at the by-election.

== Dates ==
Date	Event
19 September 2008	Resignation of Morris Iemma.
22 September 2008	Writ of election issued by the Speaker of the Legislative Assembly and close of electoral rolls.
26 September 2008	Date of nomination
18 October 2008	Polling day
1 November 2008	Return of writ

== Results ==
2008 Lakemba by-election Saturday 18 October
Party	Candidate	Votes	%	±%
Labor	Robert Furolo	23,004	58.2	−15.7
Liberal	Michael Hawatt	9,354	23.66	+10.5
Greens	Kristian Bolwell	4,847	12.3	+8.4
Christian Democrats	Allan Lotfizadeh	1,292	3.3	(Note: The combined Christian Democrats vote was 4.5 percent, an increase of 0.5 percentage points.)
	Robert Aiken	564	1.4	+1.4
Christian Democrats	Zarif Abdulla	479	1.2	
Total formal votes		39,540	96.1	+0.3
Informal votes		1,696	3.9	−0.3
Turnout		41,236	80.4	−11.75
Two-party-preferred result
Labor	Robert Furolo	24,308	70.5	−13.5
Liberal	Michael Hawatt	10,173	29.5	+13.5
Labor hold		Swing	−13.5	

== See also ==
- Electoral results for the district of Lakemba
- List of New South Wales state by-elections
