= Canterbury Town Hall =

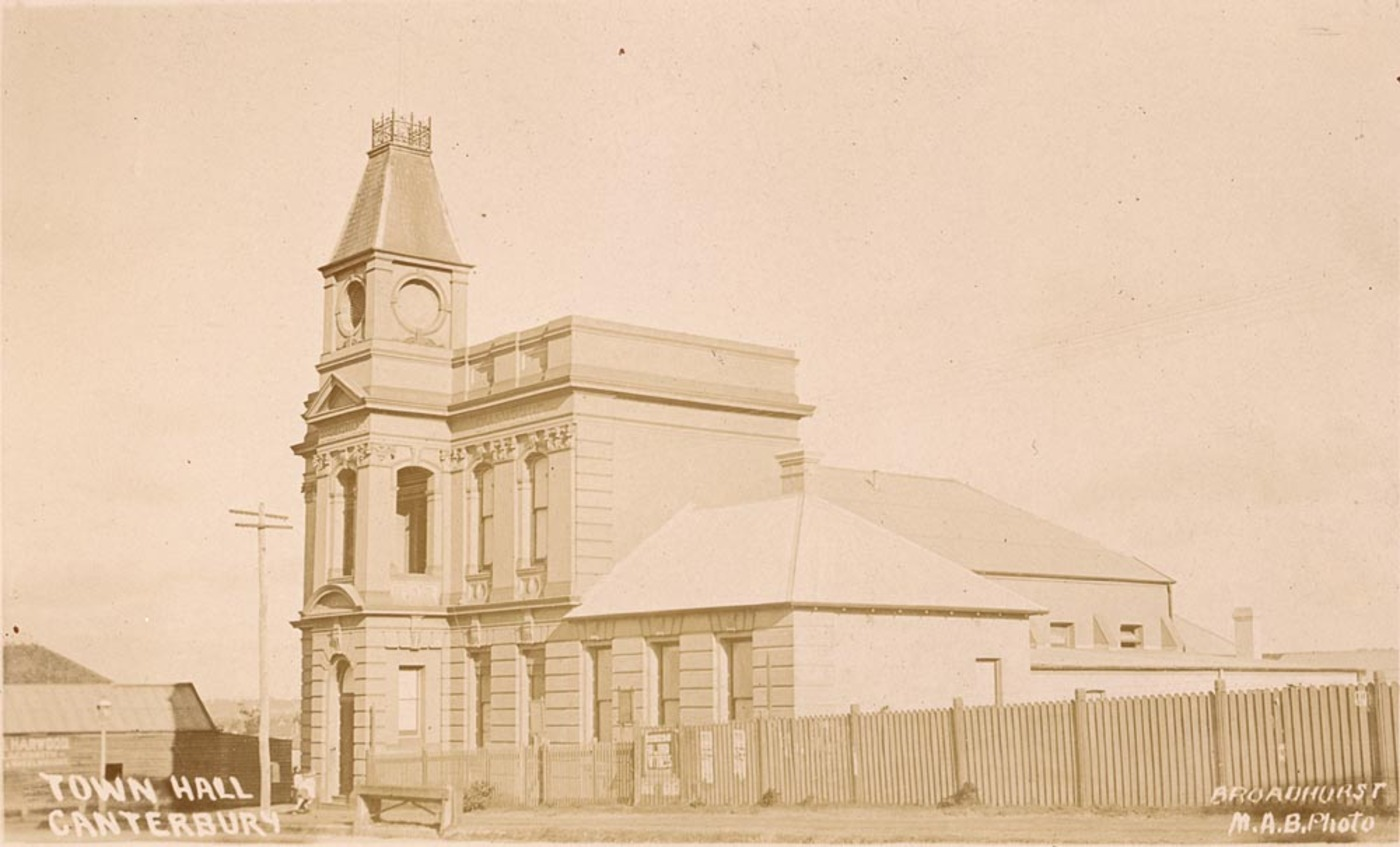

General information
- Type: Government town hall
- Architectural style: Victorian Free Classical
- Location: 322 Canterbury Road, Canterbury, New South Wales, Australia
- Completed: 11 April 1889
- Demolished: 1963
- Client: Municipal District of Canterbury

Design and construction
- Architect: Walter Hillary Monckton
- Main contractor: A. M. Allen

The Canterbury Town Hall was a municipal town hall located at 322 Canterbury Road in Canterbury, a suburb in the Inner West of Sydney, New South Wales, Australia. It was built in 1889 in the Victorian Free Classical architectural style by architect W. H. Monckton, and was officially opened on 11 April 1889 by the Prime Minister of New South Wales, Sir Henry Parkes. The Town Hall was the seat of Canterbury Municipal Council from 1889 to 1963. When the council moved to a new purpose-built administration centre on Beamish Street in Campsie, a recognition of the change in economic importance of Campsie, the town hall was quickly disposed of by Council and demolished, being replaced by a service station. Today the Town Hall site is part derelict and part paint shop.

== History ==
Sketch in Australian Town and Country Journal, 27 April 1889.

With the proclamation of the Municipality of Canterbury in March 1879, the new council turned its attention to acquiring land for a purpose-built chambers and hall for their work. However, with disputes over the specific site dragging out the process, it was not until 1887 when council eventually chose a site. A plot in Canterbury on Canterbury Road, bounded by Canton and Howard Streets, owned by Alderman John Campbell Sharp was acquired and council resolved on 7 December 1887 to move for construction of a town hall on the site.

The architect chosen, Walter Hillary Monckton of Parramatta, designed a Victorian Free Classical building with a two-storey frontage and a central tower, and tenders for construction were advertised by mid-1888. The tender of builder A. M. Allen of Summer Hill for £2307 was accepted in June 1888 and construction began.

The completed Town Hall was composed of brick, cemented on stone foundations, topped by a 60-foot (19m) high tower, and the words "J. C. Sharp J.P., Mayor." inscribed over the entrance. The building contained a small library, council clerk's offices, a public hall, and a council chamber. Provision was made to place a clock within the tower, but was never carried out. Completed less than a year after construction began, the hall was officially opened on 11 April 1889 by the NSW Premier, Sir Henry Parkes.

== Later history ==
In 1942, the main hall was converted into municipal offices, and later additions were created to the rear of the original building. However, even in the late 1940s, the council was aware of the need for more office space for the growing council staff. Council had unsuccessfully applied for special loans for the purpose of a new "Civic Centre" in 1947 and 1949 and Davey & Brindley, architects, had prepared plans along the lines of Dudok's Hilversum Town Hall.

Council's occupation continued in the Town Hall until 1962, when Council decided to construct a new administration centre at 137 Beamish Street, Campsie, adjacent to the 1958 Library and 1954 Baby Health Centre. The last Council meeting at the Town Hall was held on 22 August 1963, and the new Campsie Administration Building was opened on 21 September 1963.

The building was soon after sold and demolished to make way for blocks of flats and a service station. A sign on Canterbury Road marking the site of the former Town Hall was unveiled by the Mayor of Canterbury, Kayee Griffin, on 29 April 1998.

== See also ==
- List of town halls in Sydney
- Architecture of Sydney
