= Tony Stewart (politician) =

Australian politician

2nd Deputy Speaker of the Legislative Assembly
- In office 8 May 2007 – 11 September 2008
- Speaker: Richard Torbay
- Preceded by: John Price
- Succeeded by: Tanya Gadiel

Member of the New South Wales Legislative Assembly for Bankstown
- In office 27 March 1999 – 26 March 2011
- Preceded by: Doug Shedden
- Succeeded by: Tania Mihailuk
- Succeeded by: Ian Macdonald

Alderman/Councillor of the City of Canterbury
- In office 14 September 1991 – 9 September 1995

Personal details
- Born: 23 November 1956 (age 69) Sydney, New South Wales, Australia
- Party: Labor Party
- Profession: Teacher, union official

Anthony Paul Stewart (born 23 November 1956), a former Australian politician, was a member of the New South Wales Legislative Assembly representing the electorates of Bankstown and Lakemba between 1995 and 2011 for the Labor Party.

He was the Minister for Small Business, Minister for Science and Medical Research and Minister Assisting the Minister for Health (Cancer) in the New South Wales State Government from 8 September 2008 until 11 November 2008. He was dismissed by Premier Nathan Rees after allegations that he had verbally and physically harassed a staff member. Stewart later sought to challenge these allegations in the Court of Appeal which held that the decision to withdraw his commission as a minister was not subject to judicial review. In January 2010, he was appointed secretary assisting the minister for sport and recreation.

Stewart was elected to the NSW Legislative Assembly on 25 March 1995, representing the electorate Lakemba. He was elected as Member for Bankstown at a general election in March 1999 and re-elected to this district in March 2003 and March 2007.

Stewart decided to not contest the 2011 state election. The Labor Party endorsed Bankstown Mayor, Tania Mihailuk, as its candidate for the election held in March 2011.

New South Wales Legislative Assembly
Preceded by Wes Davoren	Member for Lakemba; 1995–1999	Succeeded by Morris Iemma
Preceded by Doug Shedden	Member for Bankstown; 1999–2011	Succeeded by Tania Mihailuk
Preceded by John Price	Deputy Speaker of the Legislative Assembly; 2007–2008	Succeeded by Tanya Gadiel
Political offices
Preceded by Verity Firth	Minister for Science and Medical Research; Minister Assisting the Minister for Health (Cancer); 2008	Succeeded by Jodi McKay
Preceded by Joe Tripodi	Minister for Small Business; 2008	Succeeded by Ian Macdonald
