= Jihad Dib =

Australian politician

Jihad Dib MLA
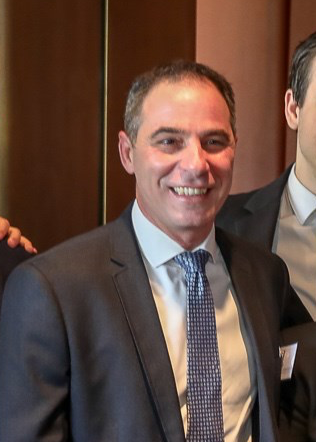

Minister for Customer Service and Digital Government
- Incumbent
- Assumed office 5 April 2023
- Premier: Chris Minns
- Preceded by: Victor Dominello

Minister for Emergency Services
- Incumbent
- Assumed office 5 April 2023
- Premier: Chris Minns
- Preceded by: Steph Cooke

Minister for Youth Justice
- Incumbent
- Assumed office 5 April 2023
- Premier: Chris Minns
- Preceded by: portfolio established

Member of the New South Wales Legislative Assembly for Bankstown
- Incumbent
- Assumed office 25 March 2023
- Preceded by: Tania Mihailuk
- Majority: 22.0% (14,712)

Member of the New South Wales Legislative Assembly for Lakemba
- In office 28 March 2015 – 25 March 2023
- Preceded by: Robert Furolo
- Succeeded by: District abolished

Personal details
- Born: 1973 (age 52–53) Tripoli, Lebanon
- Party: Labor
- Relations: Billy Dib (brother)
- Education: University of Wollongong
- Profession: Politician; Teacher

Jihad Dib (born 1973) is a Lebanese-born Australian politician who has served as the member for Bankstown in the NSW lower house since 2023 as a member of the Labor Party.

== Early life and career ==
Dib was born in Lebanon and migrated to Australia with his family when he was two years old. He began his career as a teacher at Ulladulla High School. He was principal of Punchbowl Boys High School from 2007 to 2014 and is acknowledged for changing a tough school into a respected community facility. He had previously served on the Australia Day Council of New South Wales, the New South Wales Police Commissioner's Advisory Panel and the SBS Community Advisory Committee, and was awarded a Pride of Australia award in 2013.

== Political career ==
Dib was elected at the 2015 New South Wales state election to the Legislative Assembly as the member for Lakemba representing the Labor Party. He was the only Muslim MP to represent the Lakemba seat which had the highest proportion of Muslims in NSW and the first Muslim MP in the NSW lower house.

Following the resignation of Shadow Minister for Education Linda Burney to contest the federal seat of Barton, Dib was appointed to replace her in the portfolio. He served as Shadow Education Minister in the shadow ministries of Luke Foley and Michael Daley. Following the 2019 election, Dib was appointed as Shadow Minister for Youth, Juvenile Justice, Skills and TAFE and Shadow Minister Assisting on Multiculturalism in the shadow Ministry of Jodi McKay. In 2021 he was moved to the Emergency Services, Energy and Climate Change portfolios in the frontbench led by Chris Minns. Dib's seat of Lakemba was abolished by the New South Wales Electoral Commission prior to the 2023 election and Dib registered to contest the seat of Bankstown.

In August 2025, Dib attended the March for Humanity in Sydney, a large protest highlighting the plight of Palestinians in the Gaza conflict.

== Personal life ==
Dib is married to Erin, who graduated as a Japanese teacher in the same year as he graduated, and with whom he has three children. His brother is boxing champion Billy Dib.

New South Wales Legislative Assembly
Preceded by Robert Furolo	Member for Lakemba; 2015–2023	Seat abolished
Preceded by Tania Mihailuk	Member for Bankstown; 2023–present	Incumbent
