= Beverly Hills, New South Wales =

Beverly Hills
- Suburb
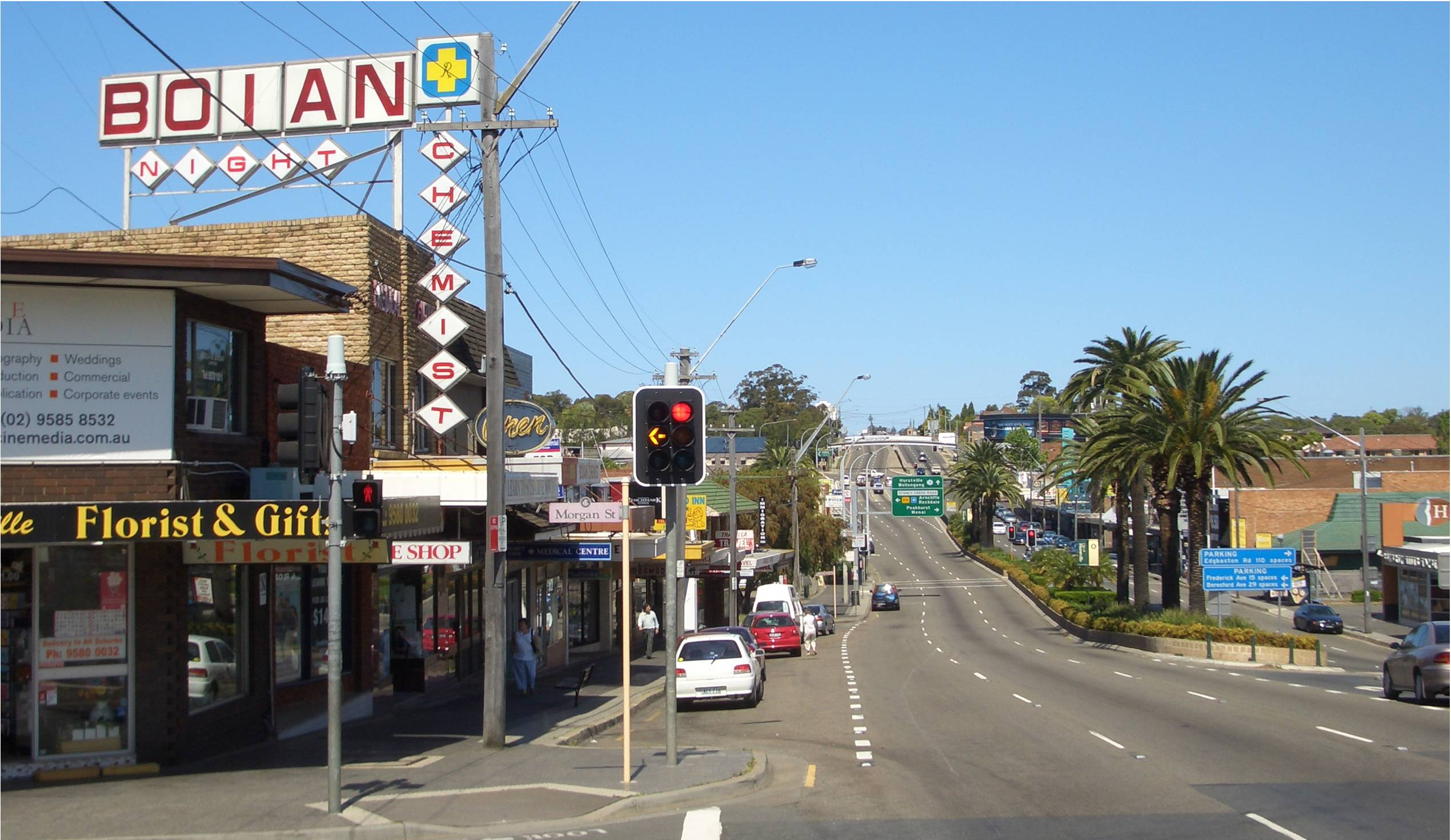
- King Georges Road looking south

- Interactive map of Beverly Hills
- Coordinates: 33°57′5″S 151°4′46″E
- Country: Australia
- State: New South Wales
- City: Sydney
- LGAs: Georges River Council; City of Canterbury-Bankstown
- Location: 15 km (9.3 mi) south-west of Sydney CBD

Government
  - State electorates: Kogarah; Oatley; Lakemba; Canterbury
  - Federal divisions: Barton; Banks
- Elevation: 32 m (105 ft)

Population
  - Total: 10,483 (2021 census)
- Postcode: 2209
Suburbs around Beverly Hills
Riverwood	Narwee	Roselands
Peakhurst	Beverly Hills	Kingsgrove
Mortdale	Penshurst	Hurstville

Beverly Hills is a southern suburb of Sydney, in the state of New South Wales, Australia. Beverly Hills is located 15 kilometres southwest of the Sydney central business district and is part of the St George area and is split between the local government areas of the Georges River Council and the City of Canterbury-Bankstown. The postcode is 2209, which it shares with neighbouring Narwee.

Beverly Hills is mostly residential, consisting of many freestanding red brick and tile bungalows built in the years immediately after World War II. Many of these feature late Art Deco design elements. Medium density flats have been built in the areas close to King Georges Road and Stoney Creek Road.

== History ==
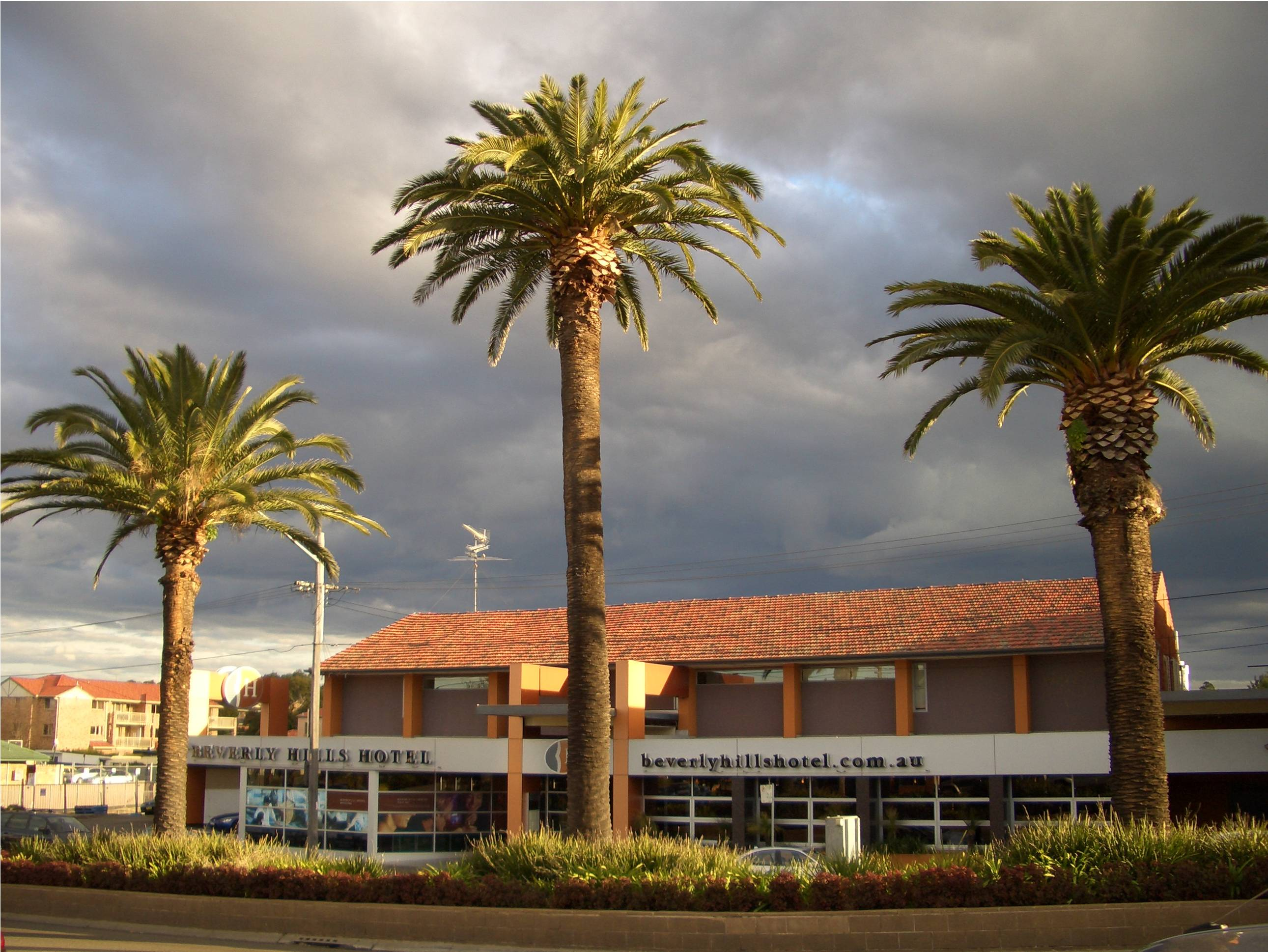
Beverly Hills Hotel, King Georges Road

Beverly Hills was originally known as Dumbleton after a local farm in the area, circa 1830. This name was generally disliked by residents who lobbied to supplant it with a more glamorous alternative to coincide with the arrival of the East Hills railway line, which opened 31 December 1931. The name was changed to Beverly Hills, at a time when Beverly Hills in California was becoming known for being the home of many famous movie stars. Real estate developments followed in the 1930s and 1940s. The post office opened 1 October 1940.

== Heritage listings ==
Beverly Hills has a number of heritage-listed sites, including:

- East Hills railway: Beverly Hills railway station
- Devonia Farm house
- Federation House
- Hilcrest
- Woodville

== Commercial area ==
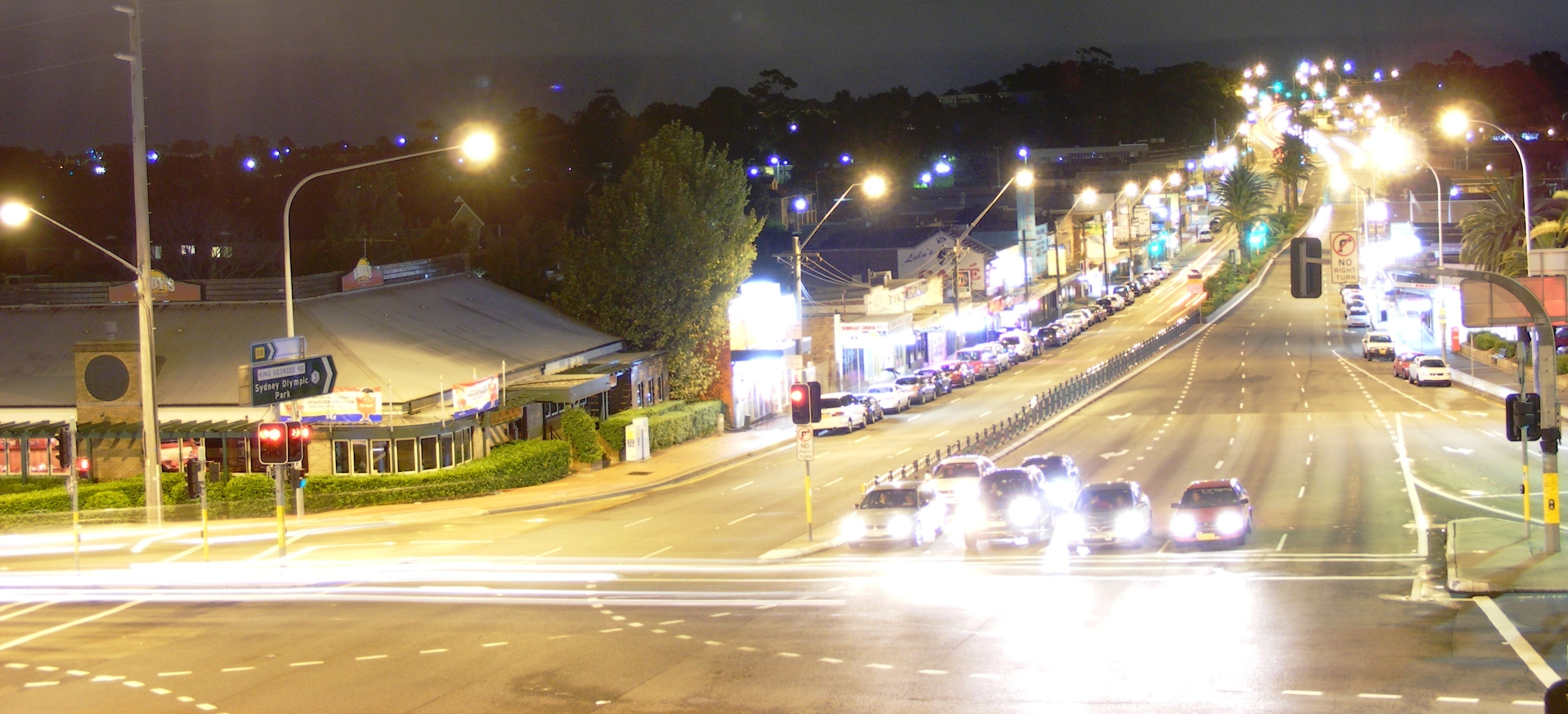
King Georges Road

The main shopping strip is located on King Georges Road, near the Beverly Hills railway station. There are over 40 different cafes, restaurants and takeaways along King Georges Road featuring Asian, Mediterranean, and Modern Australian cuisines.

The area has all the features typical of Australian metropolitan localities: restaurants, retail shops, an IGA supermarket, real estate agents, a pub (the Beverly Hills Hotel), cinema, ATMs, kindergarten, primary/high schools, Scouts, parks, leisure and health facilities.

== Transport ==
Beverly Hills railway station is on the Airport & South Line of the Sydney Trains network.

The main road running through Beverly Hills is King Georges Road, connecting it north to Wiley Park and south to Blakehurst. The road has palm trees running through its median strip as a nod to its Californian namesake. The other main road in Beverly Hills is Stoney Creek Road. This road intersects King Georges Road and connects Beverly Hills west to Peakhurst and onto Menai, and east to Rockdale, Brighton-Le-Sands, Mascot and Sydney Airport.

Entrances to the M5 Motorway are located on King Georges Road, north of the shopping centre. The M5 Motorway connects east to Bexley North, Arncliffe, Sydney Airport and the Sydney CBD and west to Liverpool and Campbelltown. Buses run along King Georges Rd connecting travellers to commercial and shopping centres at Hurstville and Roselands.

== Schools ==
Notable amongst the public buildings and amenities are Beverly Hills Girls' High School, Beverly Hills Primary School, Beverly Hills North Primary School and Regina Coeli Primary School. Beverly Hills Girls' High School has approximately 1100 students and in September 2010 was named a Centre for Excellence by NSW DET.

== Churches ==
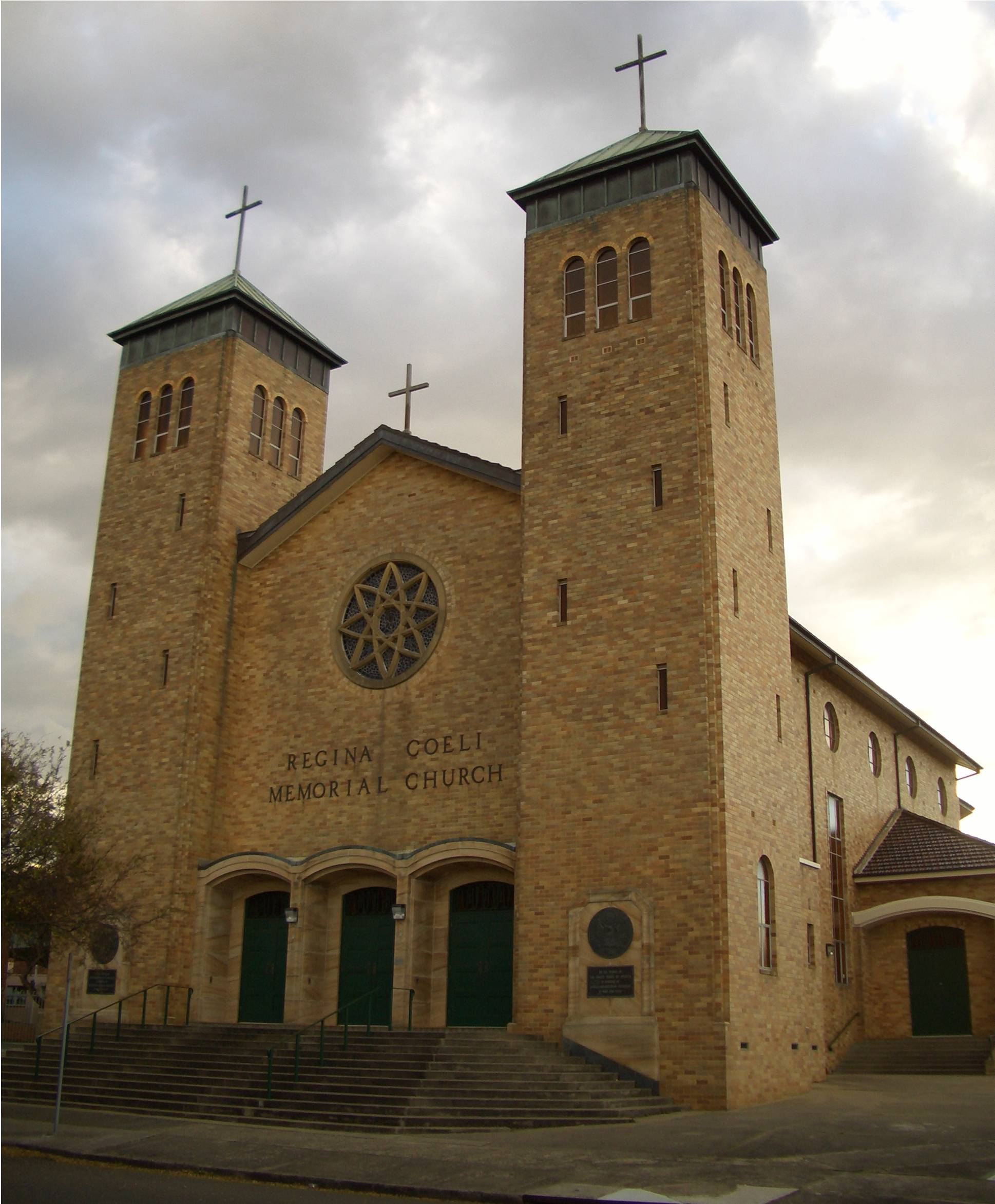
Regina Coeli Catholic Church

Regina Coeli Roman Catholic Church is Australia's only Catholic war memorial church. It was built in the early 1960s to commemorate the Australian-US alliance during World War II. The flags of both nations are permanently hung on either side of the main altar, and a special Mass attended by US service personnel and diplomatic representatives is conducted there annually in commemoration of the Battle of the Coral Sea. Regina Coeli is sited prominently on the highest point in Beverly Hills, and is a landmark visible for many kilometres in all directions.

Other churches in the suburb include: St Matthew's Anglican Church, St Bede's Anglican Church, Church@School, Beverly Hills Baptist Church, Beverly Hills Chinese Baptist Church, Beverly Hills Church of Christ, and Beverly Hills New Apostolic Church.

== Parks and recreation ==
- Beverly Hills Park features two full-length football ovals and two barbecue areas.
- Vanessa Street Multi-sport Courts
- Canterbury Golf Course
- Coolabah Street Tennis courts

== Demographics ==
According to the 2021 census of Population, there were 10,483 residents in Beverly Hills. 50.4% of people were born in Australia. The most common countries of birth were China 13.4%, Hong Kong 3.4%, Greece 2.2%, Vietnam 2.0% and Philippines 1.9%. 37.8% of people only spoke English at home. Other languages spoken at home included Cantonese 13.1%, Mandarin 11.9%, Greek 7.5%, Arabic 6.5% and Vietnamese 2.2%. The most common responses for religious affiliation were No Religion 26.0%, Catholic 23.0% and Eastern Orthodox 12.0%.

== Notable people ==
- Colin Dunmore Fuller (1882–1953), farmer and soldier
- John Hewson (born 1946), politician
- Clara Iemma (born 1998), cricketer
- Georgina McCready (1888–1980), nurse, trade unionist and administrator
- Arthur Morris (1922–2015), cricketer
