= Vince Durick =

Australian politician

Vincent Durick MLA

Member of the New South Wales Legislative Assembly for Lakemba
- In office 19 September 1964 – 24 March 1984
- Preceded by: Stan Wyatt
- Succeeded by: Wes Davoren

Personal details
- Born: 3 January 1916 Broken Hill, New South Wales, Australia
- Died: 21 February 1996 (aged 80) Lidcombe, New South Wales, Australia
- Party: Labor

Vincent Patrick Durick (3 January 1916 – 21 February 1996) was an Australian politician. He was a Labor Party member of the New South Wales Legislative Assembly from 1964 to 1984, representing the electorate of Lakemba.

Durick was born in Broken Hill, and attended the Railway Town convent school and Marist Brothers College. He moved to Sydney at the age of 17 to attend the Sydney Teachers College, before returning to Broken Hill to teach at Broken Hill Central School. He served in the Second Australian Imperial Force from 1941 to 1944 before being discharged on medical grounds, and returned to teaching at North Broken Hill. In 1946, he relocated from rural Euston to teach at Lakemba Public School in suburban Sydney. He transferred to the state high school system in 1949, teaching variously at Bowral, Homebush Boys High School, Fairfield, and James Cook High school before entering politics.

Durick entered parliament at a 1964 by-election following the death of the incumbent local member, Stan Wyatt. Lakemba was a safe seat for the Labor Party, and Durick was re-elected seven times. Durick served as caucus returning officer for the crucial 1973 leadership ballot that saw Neville Wran win the Labor leadership from Pat Hills; though a Hills supporter, Durick resolved a tied vote by ruling that Wran had won by virtue of leading on the first count. He did not hold party, parliamentary or ministerial office; however, he narrowly missed out on becoming Speaker on one occasion when his rival's name was drawn from a hat. Durick retired at the 1984 state election, and was succeeded by Wes Davoren.

Durick died in February 1996 at Lidcombe.

New South Wales Legislative Assembly
Preceded by Stan Wyatt	Member for Lakemba; 1964–1984	Succeeded by Wes Davoren
