= City of Canterbury (New South Wales) =

Former local government area in New South Wales, Australia

- Local government area
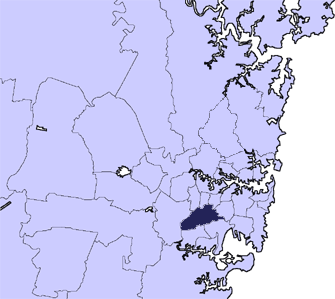
- Location in Metropolitan Sydney

- Coordinates: 33°55′S 151°06′E
- Country: Australia
- State: New South Wales
- Region: Inner West; South West
- Established: 17 March 1879 (Municipality); 16 November 1993 (City)
- Abolished: 12 May 2016
- Council seat: Canterbury Administration Building, Campsie

Government
  - Mayor: Brian Robson (Labor)

Area
  - Total: 34 km^{2} (13 sq mi)

Population
  - Total: 146,314 (2012)
  - Density: 4,303.45/km^{2} (11,145.9/sq mi)
- Website: City of Canterbury
LGAs around City of Canterbury
Strathfield	Burwood	Ashfield
Bankstown	City of Canterbury	Marrickville
Bankstown	Hurstville	Rockdale

The City of Canterbury was a local government area in the Inner South-West region of Sydney, New South Wales, Australia. The council area was within the northern part of the Parish of St George above Wolli Creek and The M5 but below The Cooks River. The city was primarily residential and light industrial in character, and was home to over 130 nationalities. With a majority of its residents being born overseas, the council marketed itself as the "City of Cultural Diversity." First incorporated as the Municipality of Canterbury in 1879, the council became known as the City of Canterbury in 1993.

The last Mayor of the City of Canterbury Council was Cr. Brian Robson, a member of the Labor Party, until 12 May 2016 when the City was amalgamated with the City of Bankstown, forming the City of Canterbury-Bankstown.

== Suburbs in the local government area ==
Suburbs in the former City of Canterbury were:

- Ashbury (Note: with a minor portion within the Municipality of Ashfield)
- Belfield (Note: with parts within the Municipality of Strathfield)
- Belmore
- Beverly Hills (Note: with parts within the City of Hurstville)
- Campsie
- Canterbury
- Clemton Park
- Croydon Park (Note: with parts within Burwood Council and the Municipality of Ashfield)
- Earlwood
- Hurlstone Park
- Kingsgrove (Note: with parts within the City of Hurstville & City of Rockdale)
- Lakemba
- Narwee
- Punchbowl (Note: with parts within the City of Bankstown)
- Riverwood
- Roselands
- Wiley Park

== History ==
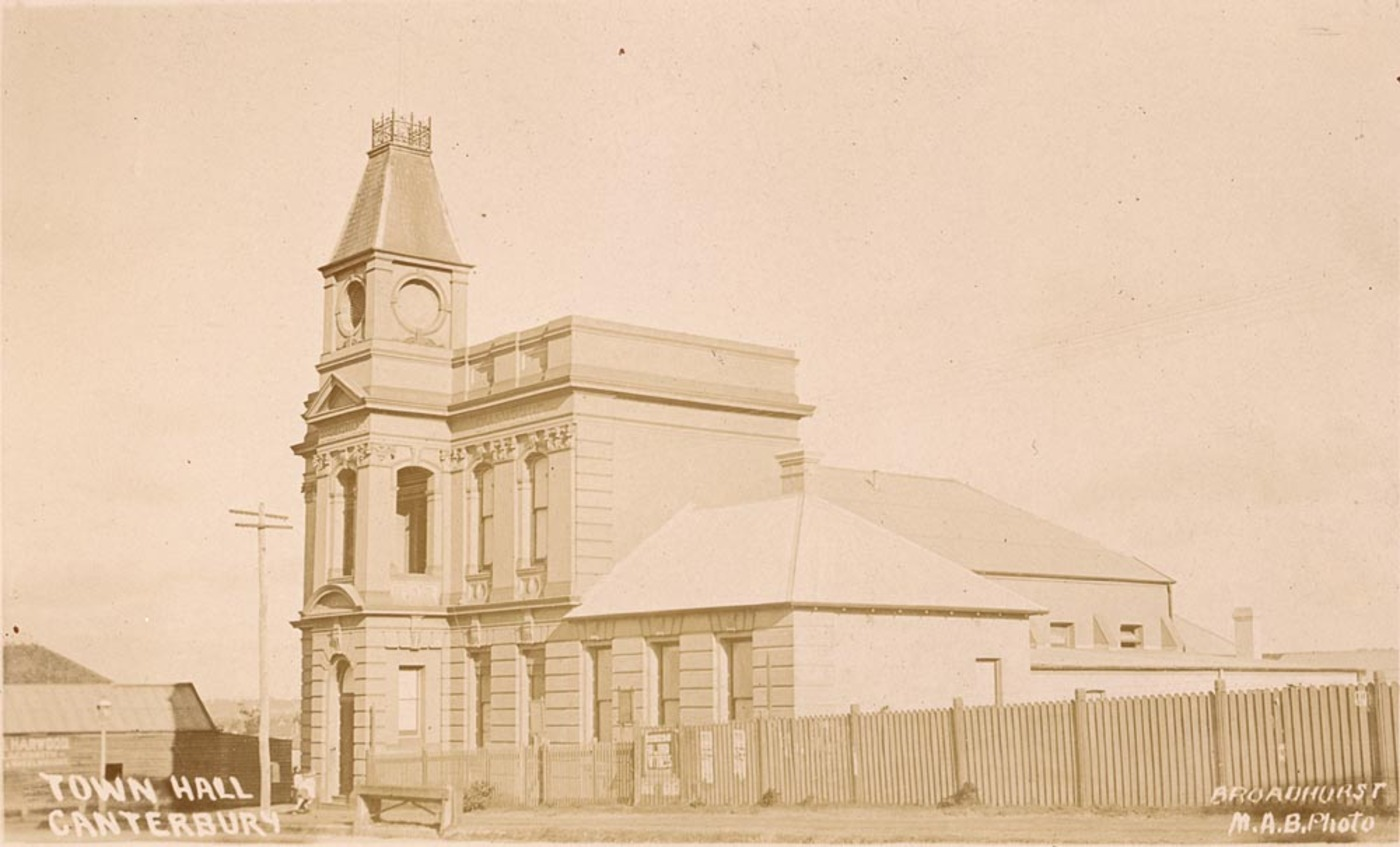
Canterbury Town Hall, opened in 1889, demolished in 1963

Indigenous Australians lived in this area for thousands of years. In 1770, the land along the Cooks River was explored by officers from HM Bark Endeavour. In 1793, the area's first land grant was made to the chaplain of the First Fleet, the Reverend Richard Johnson, and given the name Canterbury Vale.

Residential development began picking up in the area during the 1880s and the was extended to Canterbury in 1895, encouraging further suburban development which led to the area becoming heavily populated. A leading developer at this time was Frederick Gibbes, a Member of Parliament for the seat of Newtown.

After much petitioning of the State Government by local residents, the Municipality of Canterbury was proclaimed on 17 March 1879. The council first met in the home of the first mayor, Alderman John Sproule and premised were then leased in the St Paul's Church schoolroom at 47-49 Canterbury Road, Canterbury. The Canterbury Town Hall, located on Canterbury Road between Canton and Howard Streets, was opened in 1889 by the Premier of New South Wales, Sir Henry Parkes. However, over time, Campsie became a more important centre, particularly along Beamish Street and Canterbury Council planned a gradual move of civic services there when funds became available. In 1954 a Baby Health Centre by Davey & Brindley opened on Beamish Street, followed by a library next door by Davey, Brindley & Vickery in 1958 at a cost of £30,000, and the municipal administration finally moved in 1963. At the time of its opening by the mayor R. J. Schofield on 26 September 1958, the Campsie Library was reputed to be the largest municipal library in Sydney. The Canterbury Municipal Administration Building designed by architects Whitehead & Payne, built by Rex Building Company Pty Ltd, and completed at a cost of £163,000 was opened adjacent to the Library and Baby Health Centre by the mayor, James S. Scott, on 21 September 1963. The City of Canterbury was proclaimed on 16 November 1993 by the Governor of New South Wales, Rear Admiral Peter Sinclair.

=== Amalgamation ===
A 2015 review of local government boundaries by the NSW Government Independent Pricing and Regulatory Tribunal recommended that the City of Canterbury merge with the City of Bankstown to form a new council with an area of 110 square kilometres (42 sq mi) and support a population of approximately 351,000. Following an independent review, on 12 May 2016 the Minister for Local Government announced that the merger with the City of Bankstown would proceed with immediate effect, creating a new council with an area of 72 square kilometres (28 sq mi).

=== Council dysfunction and ICAC Operation Dasha ===
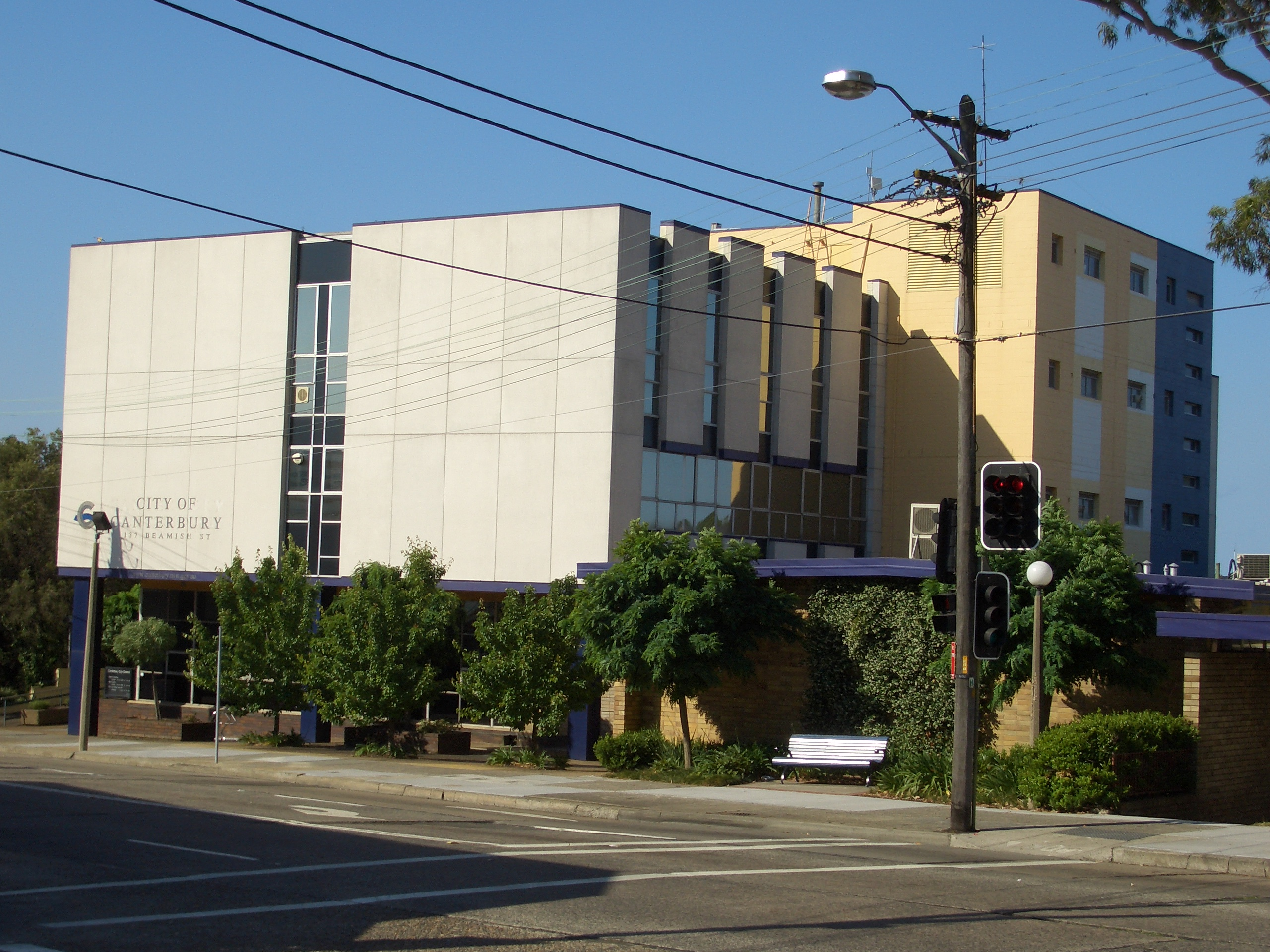
The Administration Building on Beamish Street, Campsie, was the seat of Canterbury Council from 1963–2016. It was designed by architects Whitehead & Payne and built by Rex Building Company P/L, to complete the 'civic centre' with the adjacent library and baby health centre. It is now secondary offices for the City of Canterbury Bankstown.

On 26 March 2018, the NSW Independent Commission Against Corruption (ICAC) commenced investigations and a public inquiry (known as Operation Dasha) into allegations concerning actions of the former Canterbury City Council between 2013 and 2016, "where public officials including councillors Michael Hawatt and Pierre Azzi, the former general manager, Jim Montague, and the former Director City Planning, Spiro Stavis, dishonestly and/or partially exercised their official functions in relation to planning proposals and/or applications under the Environmental Planning and Assessment Act 1979 concerning properties in the Canterbury City Council local area."

Among the decisions Stavis presided over were the variations of Council's controls approved by Council and justified under Section 4.6 of the Environmental Planning and Assessment Act 1979, particularly along the Canterbury Road Corridor. With the appointment of Administrator Richard Colley as head of the new City of Canterbury-Bankstown on 12 May 2016, Colley ordered a halt to development proposals along the corridor until a comprehensive review was completed, noting "One of the first things that I came across following the amalgamation was what I saw as the ad hoc development on Canterbury Road, most of it non-compliant with the former Canterbury Council's residential development strategy, particularly in terms of height and bulk and size, and the effect on Canterbury Road itself". Former mayor Brian Robson admitted that the last 2012-2016 Council term "started getting messy with certain councillors trying to push the barrow of individual developers ... after that we started getting messy with individual spot rezonings."

The review report presented to Council in July 2017 declared that as a result of previous actions taken by the former Council, the Canterbury Road Corridor "is a noisy, polluted and harsh environment, generally unsuitable in its current state for housing" and presented 14 recommendations including: Appropriate zoning, urban design and built-form controls along the corridor; Measures to address environmental issues, such as noise and pollution; Traffic, transport and car parking issues; Providing good access to parks, community facilities, public transport and shops; and completing a new city-wide Local Environmental Plan (LEP) by 2020, to guide all development. All the recommendations were subsequently adopted by Council, with the Canterbury Bankstown Mayor, Khal Asfour, noting on Council's rejection of one planning proposal in the corridor: "This kind of development won’t be approved on my watch, this proposal involved rezoning land reserved for employment to build an eight-storey residential complex, which would have been an inappropriate development for that location. We remain committed to our City and its residents. We will consult them and protect them from overdevelopment, and make no apology for that."

ICAC also undertook investigations into the circumstances surrounding the appointment of Stavis as Director City Planning, and whether he had been appointed through a dishonest and politically-motivated process influenced by Councillors Hawatt and Azzi. The public inquiry heard evidence that the previous Director had resigned following sustained pressure by Hawatt and Azzi over decisions on certain development applications, and they had pressured Montague in accepting Stavis as the acceptable candidate as Director, when he was not the most qualified for the position compared to other candidates, to the point of "blackmail and threats". This included an aborted attempt by Hawatt and Azzi to dismiss Montague from his position as General Manager in a Council Meeting in January 2015, amidst allegations that "Montague had spent more than $42,000 of council funds on lunches over the past five years and that he had mishandled the recent employment of the council's new director of city planning."

In July 2018, the Liberal Member of Parliament for Wagga Wagga, Daryl Maguire, was drawn into the inquiry regarding possible corruption through his association with former Liberal councillor Hawatt. It was alleged that Maguire had acted on behalf of a "mega big" Chinese client, asking for help in buying into development-approved projects, in return for a commission from the developer for both himself and Hawatt. As a consequence, Maguire resigned from the Liberal Party, and from his roles Parliamentary Secretary for the Centenary of ANZAC, Counter Terrorism, Corrections and Veterans. After initially refusing to resign from Parliament, Maguire resigned from parliament on 3 August 2018.

The ICAC investigations for 'Operation Dasha' are ongoing. In March 2017 Administrator Richard Colley adopted a new Code of Conduct for Canterbury Bankstown noting: "Honesty, fairness and transparency are the values underpinning our new council’s code of conduct policies, ensuring residents can be confident the decisions we make are in their best interest". The Code of Conduct was the first in the state to be approved by ICAC.

== Council ==
=== Final composition and election method ===
Canterbury City Council was composed of ten Councillors, including the Mayor, elected for a fixed four-year term of office. The Mayor was directly elected since 1976 while the nine other Councillors were elected proportionally as three separate wards, each electing three Councillors. The final election was held on 8 September 2012, and the makeup of the Council, prior to its abolition, was as follows:

The last Council, elected in 2012 until its abolition in 2016, in order of election by ward, was:

Ward	Councillor	Party	Notes
Mayor	Brian Robson	Labor	Mayor 2011–2016. West Ward Councillor 1999–2011. Deputy Mayor 2003–2004, 2007–2008.
Central Ward	Mark Adler	Labor	Elected 1999–2016.
Central Ward	Ken Nam	Liberal	Elected 2008–2016.
Central Ward	Fadwa Kebbea	Labor	Elected 1999–2016. Deputy Mayor 2009–2010, 2014–2015.
East Ward	Con Vasiliades	Liberal	Elected 2012–2016.
East Ward	Esta Paschalidis-Chilas	Labor	Elected 2012–2016.
East Ward	Linda Eisler	Greens	Elected 2008–2016. Elected Canterbury-Bankstown Council Canterbury Ward 2017.
West Ward	Karl Saleh	Labor	Elected 2004–2016. Deputy Mayor 2008–2009, 2012–2013, 2015–2016.
West Ward	Michael Hawatt	Liberal	Elected 1999–2016.
West Ward	Pierre Azzi	Labor	Elected 2012–2016. Deputy Mayor 2013–2014.

== Mayors and General Managers ==
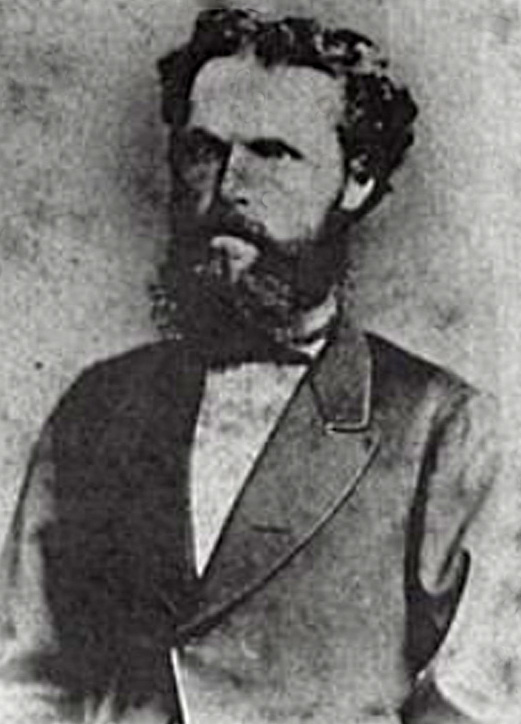
John Sproule (1838–1905), the first Mayor of Canterbury from 1879 to 1880, was also three times Mayor of Hurstville (1890–1891, 1897–1898).

=== Mayors ===
Mayor	Party	Term start	Term end	Time in office	Notes
John Sproule	Independent	16 June 1879	10 February 1880	239 days	
John Campbell Sharp	Independent	10 February 1880	19 February 1883	3 years, 9 days	
Thomas Austen Davis	Independent	19 February 1883	14 February 1884	360 days	
Benjamin Taylor	Independent	14 February 1884	3 February 1886	1 year, 354 days	
James Slocombe	Independent	3 February 1886	13 February 1888	2 years, 10 days	
John Campbell Sharp	Independent	13 February 1888	24 August 1889	1 year, 192 days	
James McBean	Independent	24 August 1889	12 February 1890	172 days	
James Charles Stone	Independent	12 February 1890	11 February 1891	364 days	
John Quigg	Independent	11 February 1891	19 February 1892	1 year, 8 days	
Patrick Joseph Scahill	Independent	19 February 1892	15 February 1895	2 years, 361 days	
Sydney Robert Lorking	Independent	15 February 1895	16 February 1899	4 years, 1 day	
George Wallace Nicoll	Independent	16 February 1899	16 February 1900	1 year	
Jeffrey Denniss	Independent	16 February 1900	11 February 1904	3 years, 360 days	
Benjamin Taylor	Independent	11 February 1904	16 February 1906	2 years, 5 days	
Jeffrey Denniss	Independent	16 February 1906	10 February 1908	1 year, 359 days	
John Edward Draper	Independent	10 February 1908	February 1910	2 years	
John McCulloch	Independent	February 1910	February 1911	1 year	
Patrick Joseph Scahill	Independent	February 1911	February 1912	1 year	
John Edward Draper	Liberal Reform	February 1912	10 February 1913	1 year	
George Frederick Wells Hocking	Labor	10 February 1913	March 1914	1 year	
James Augustus Wilson	Labor	March 1914	February 1917	2 years	
Arthur Preston	Independent	February 1917	February 1920	3 years	
George Frederick Wells Hocking	Labor	February 1920	11 December 1922	2 years, 304 days	
John Henry Ewen	Citizens' Progress Party	11 December 1922	7 December 1925	2 years, 361 days	
Norman Rydge	Labor	7 December 1925	20 December 1926	1 year, 13 days	
Eric Howard Stephenson	Labor	20 December 1926	19 December 1927	364 days	
Asa North	Labor	19 December 1927	10 December 1928	357 days	
George Harold Bramston	Citizens' Progress Party	10 December 1928	8 January 1932	3 years, 29 days	
Stanley Parry	Independent	8 January 1932	August 1947	15 years, 211 days	
Harold McPherson		7 August 1947	December 1948	1 year, 121 days	
Colin Williams		December 1948	6 December 1949	1 year	
Samuel Warren		6 December 1949	December 1951	2 years	
Herbert Reuben Thorncraft		6 December 1951	December 1953	2 years	
George Herbert Mulder	Labor	December 1953	December 1956	3 years	
Stanley Charles Reuben Squire		December 1956	December 1957	1 year	
R. J. Schofield	Independent	December 1957	December 1958	1 year	
Stanley Charles Reuben Squire		December 1958	10 December 1959	1 year	
R. J. Schofield	Independent	10 December 1959	December 1962	3 years	
Ronald Gordon Pate		December 1962	8 December 1963	1 year	
James Schofield Scott	Labor	8 December 1963	10 December 1965	2 years, 2 days	
Alfred James Pate	Independent	10 December 1965	December 1967	2 years	
James William Eccles		5 December 1967	December 1968	1 year	
Allan Mulder	Labor	8 December 1968	December 1969	1 year	
James William Eccles		December 1969	December 1970	1 year	
James Beaman		December 1970	September 1971	281 days	
Colin Gordon Williams		September 1971	September 1976	5 years	
John Mountford	Labor	September 1976	October 1980	4 years, 30 days	
Kevin Moss	Labor	October 1980	September 1987	6 years, 335 days	
John Gorrie	Labor	September 1987	September 1995	8 years	
Kayee Griffin	Labor	September 1995	January 2004	8 years, 122 days	
Robert Furolo	Labor	January 2004	21 October 2011	7 years, 273 days	
Brian Robson	Labor	1 November 2011	12 May 2016	4 years, 193 days	

=== Town Clerk/General Managers ===
Town Clerk/General Manager	Term start	Term end	Time in office	Notes
Neil Quigg	7 July 1879	February 1880	223 days	
Edwin Tyrell Sayers	February 1880	December 1882	2 years	
Samuel Mantle Burrowes	5 January 1883	September 1883	243 days	
Hector Innes	5 September 1883	15 August 1888	4 years, 345 days	
Benjamin Taylor	15 August 1888	20 October 1902	14 years, 66 days	
Frederick John Davis	20 October 1902	2 March 1907	4 years, 133 days	
Samuel Ernest Marsden	2 March 1907	1 October 1910	3 years, 213 days	
Charles Lipson Iverson	1 October 1910	1911	0–1 year	
Harold Linden Dunstan	1911	October 1912	0–1 year	
Frederick Haworth JP	October 1912	22 February 1914	1 year	
James Lane Sutton	June 1914	12 March 1929	14 years	
Robert Brouff	2 December 1929	1934	4–5 years	
Edgar Jay	September 1934	1941	6–7 years	
Claude Hunt	1941	1942	0–1 years	
Robert Brouff	1942	1948	5–6 years	
Selwyn Lofts	1948	1965	16–17 years	
Jack Wheeler	1965	May 1973	7–8 years	
Jack Whitmarsh	May 1973	1982	8–9 years	
Jim Montague PSM	1982	12 May 2016	33–34 years	

== Demographics ==
At the 2011 Census, there were 137,454 people in the Canterbury local government area, with an equal proportion of male and female residents. Aboriginal and Torres Strait Islander people made up 0.6% of the population. The median age of people in the City of Canterbury was 35 years. Children aged 0 – 14 years made up 20.0% of the population and people aged 65 years and over made up 13.5% of the population. of people in the area aged 15 years and over, 52.9% were married and 10.8% were either divorced or separated.

Population growth in the City of Canterbury between the 2001 Census and the 2006 Census was 0.02%; and in the subsequent five years to the 2011 Census, population growth was 5.76%. When compared with total population growth of Australia for the same periods, being 5.78% and 8.32% respectively, population growth in Canterbury local government area was approximately half the national average. The median weekly income for residents within the City of Canterbury is significantly lower than the national average.

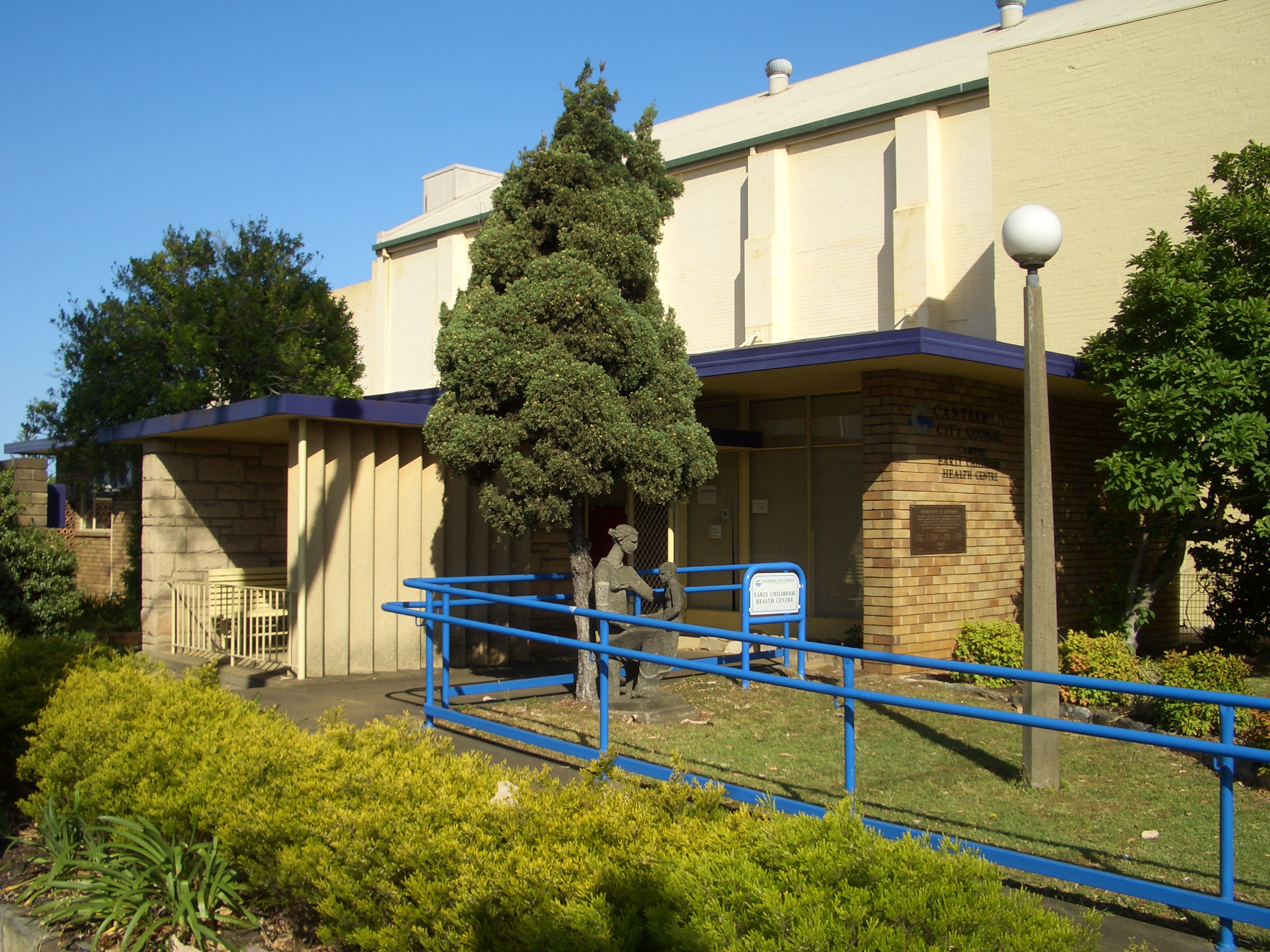
Campsie Early Childhood Centre, designed by architects Davey & Brindley in 1954.

Selected historical census data for Canterbury local government area
Census year		2001	2006	2011
Population	Estimated residents on Census night	129,935	129,963	137,454
Population	LGA rank in terms of size within New South Wales			
Population	% of New South Wales population			1.99%
Population	% of Australian population	0.69%	▼0.65%	▼0.64%
Cultural and language diversity				
Ancestry, top responses	Chinese			11.6%
Ancestry, top responses	Australian			9.7%
Ancestry, top responses	Lebanese			9.5%
Ancestry, top responses	Greek			9.5%
Ancestry, top responses	English			8.9%
Language, top responses (other than English)	Arabic	12.2%	▼10.1%	▲13.2%
Language, top responses (other than English)	Greek	11.1%	▼10.4%	▼9.8%
Language, top responses (other than English)	Mandarin	1.7%	▲2.7%	▲5.6%
Language, top responses (other than English)	Cantonese	2.7%	▲3.3%	▲5.5%
Language, top responses (other than English)	Vietnamese	n/c	▲2.2%	▲3.8%
Religious affiliation				
Religious affiliation, top responses	Catholic	43.4%	▼41.7%	▼25.6%
Religious affiliation, top responses	Islam	5.1%	5.1%	▲16.6%
Religious affiliation, top responses	Eastern Orthodox	15.8%	▼13.4%	▲13.6%
Religious affiliation, top responses	No religion	11.1%	▲13.4%	▼12.5%
Religious affiliation, top responses	Buddhism	n/c	n/c	▲6.1%
Median weekly incomes				
Personal income	Median weekly personal income		A$366	A$430
Personal income	% of Australian median income		78.5%	74.5%
Family income	Median weekly family income		A$839	A$1,149
Family income	% of Australian median income		81.7%	77.6%
Household income	Median weekly household income		A$1,007	A$1,029
Household income	% of Australian median income		86.0%	83.4%

== Coat of arms and logo ==
Coat of arms of the City of Canterbury
Notes The arms of the City of Canterbury, granted by Letters of the King of Arms, College of Arms, designed by H. Ellis Tomlinson on the occasion of the centenary of the Municipality of Canterbury, consist of: Adopted 23 April 1979 Crest On a wreath of the colours, within a circlet of six mullets each of eight points or, a mount vert issuant therefrom a cross formy fitchy sable entwined with a rose argent, barbed, seeded, stalked, leaved and slipped proper. Escutcheon Argent a bar wavy azure between three choughs proper, each holding in the dexter foot a cross formy fitchy sable, on a chief gules a lion couchant guardant. Argent a bar wavy azure between three choughs proper, each holding in the dexter foot a cross formy fitchy sable, on a chief gules a lion couchant guardant. Supporters On either side a sea-horse argent gorged with a collar wavy azure charged with two Polar Stars or, one being manifest, and holding in the mouth a sprig of Canterbury Bell proper with five flowers azure. Motto Latin: Magnum Nomen Habemus ("We bear a great name") Badge Perched upon two sprigs of Canterbury Bell in saltire proper each with three flowers azure a chough proper holding in the dexter foot a cross formy fitchy sable. Symbolism The shield is based on arms of Canterbury, Kent, England, which displays a gold lion on red above the three choughs, attributed as the arms of St. Thomas Becket, Archbishop of Canterbury 1162–1170. To the choughs is added a blue wave for Cooks River, and each holds a distinctive black cross from the arms of the Archbishop of Canterbury. At the top of the shield, the gold lion is taken from the former council seal. The Crest is set in the colours of white and blue, the NSW colours, and refers to the foundation and naming of Canterbury by the Reverend Richard Johnson, appointed as the State's first chaplain in 1786. A ring of gold stars from the State arms encloses a grassy mound representing Johnson's grant of Brickfield Hill in which is fixed the Canterbury cross to denote his foundation of the Church in the place named Canterbury Vale. His Yorkshire origins are indicated by the White Rose of York. The Supporters are a marine version of the White horse of Kent, England, of which the City of Canterbury is the capital. These 'sea-horses' denote coastal or river traffic, charged with the Polar Star from James Cook's arms. In their mouths are sprays of the Canterbury Bell flower, also taken from the former seal.

=== Logo ===
In 1990, the council's Engineering Department produced the logo in everyday usage until 2016, it consisted of two C's in black and white, intersected by a wave in light blue, which represents the Cooks River and is taken from the council arms issued in 1979.

== Sister cities ==
- Eunpyong-gu, Seoul, South Korea. A special friendship garden in Loft Gardens at Campsie commemorating the relationship begun in 1988, in the design of the Taegukgi, was unveiled in November 2000 by the mayors of Canterbury and Eunpyong-gu.
- Patras, Greece.
