= Electoral district of Lakemba =

State electoral district of New South Wales, Australia

Lakemba New South Wales—Legislative Assembly
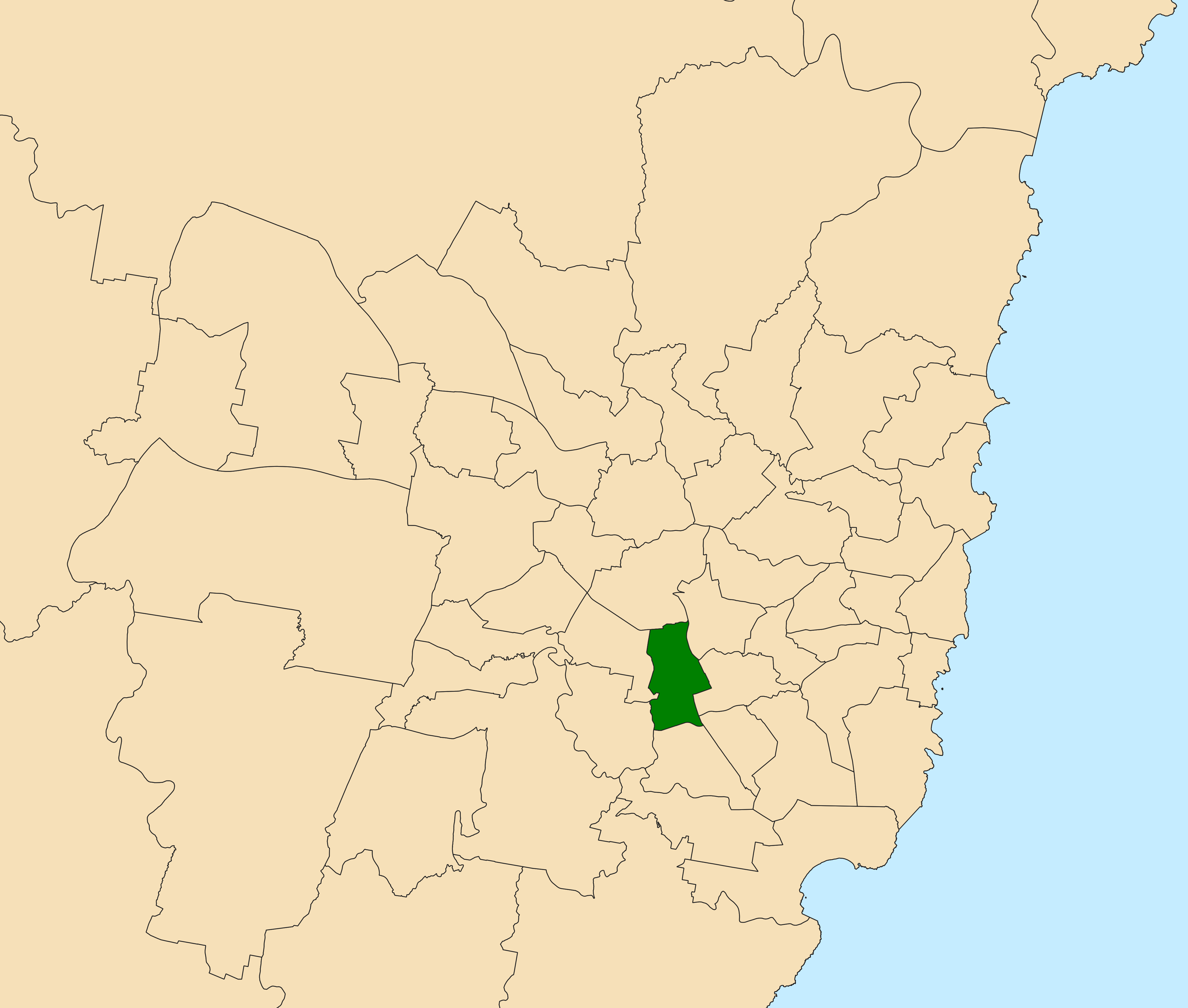
- Location within Sydney
- State: New South Wales
- Abolished: 2023
- Dates current: 1927–2023
- Electors: 55,253 (2019)
- Area: 23.70 km^{2} (9.2 sq mi)
- Demographic: Outer-metropolitan
Electorates around Lakemba:
Auburn	Auburn	Strathfield
Bankstown	Lakemba	Canterbury
East Hills	Oatley	Kogarah

Lakemba was an electoral district of the Legislative Assembly in the Australian state of New South Wales, located in the South-Western suburbs of Sydney. It has been held by the Labor Party since its creation in 1927. It was represented by Morris Iemma, who was Premier of New South Wales from 3 August 2005 until his resignation on 5 September 2008. It was last held by Jihad Dib from the 2015 election to its abolishment.

Lakemba included the suburbs of Chullora, Greenacre, Lakemba, Mount Lewis, Punchbowl, Wiley Park and parts of Bankstown, Belmore, Beverly Hills, Narwee, Riverwood and Roselands.

As a result of a redistribution in 2021, Lakemba was abolished at the 2023 election; its territory split between Bankstown, Canterbury and Oatley.

== Members for Lakemba ==
Member	Party	Term
Fred Stanley	Labor	1927–1940
Fred Stanley	Labor (N-C)	1940–1941
Fred Stanley	Labor	1941–1950
Fred Stanley	Independent Labor	1950
Stan Wyatt	Labor	1950–1964
Vince Durick	Labor	1964–1984
Wes Davoren	Labor	1984–1995
Tony Stewart	Labor	1995–1999
Morris Iemma	Labor	1999–2008
Robert Furolo	Labor	2008–2015
Jihad Dib	Labor	2015–2023

== Election results ==
2019 New South Wales state election: Lakemba
Party	Candidate	Votes	%	±%
Labor	Jihad Dib	27,528	61.70	+4.40
Liberal	Rashid Bhuiyan	10,031	22.48	+1.76
Christian Democrats	Karl Schubert	3,170	7.11	−5.70
Greens	Emmet de Bhaldraithe	2,041	4.57	−2.91
Keep Sydney Open	Omar Najjar	988	2.21	+2.21
Animal Justice	Dorlene Abou-Haidar	857	1.92	+1.92
Total formal votes		44,615	93.87	−0.60
Informal votes		2,916	6.13	+0.60
Turnout		47,531	86.02	−0.89
Two-party-preferred result
Labor	Jihad Dib	29,245	72.42	+0.86
Liberal	Rashid Bhuiyan	11,136	27.58	−0.86
Labor hold		Swing	+0.86	
