= Clara Iemma =

Australian cricketer (born 1998)

Personal information
- Full name: Clara Marie Iemma
- Born: 31 October 1998 (age 28); Beverly Hills, New South Wales, Australia
- Batting: Left-handed
- Bowling: Right-arm off break
- Role: Batting all-rounder

Domestic team information
- Years: Team
- 2017/18–2018/19: Australian Capital Territory

Career statistics
Competition	WLA
Matches	4
Runs scored	58
Batting average	29.00
100s/50s	0/0
Top score	35
Catches/stumpings	0/–
- Source: CricketArchive, 29 June 2021

Clara Marie Iemma (born 31 October 1998) is an Australian cricketer. She is an all-rounder who bats left-handed and bowls right-arm off break. She has played four List A matches for the Australian Capital Territory in the Women's National Cricket League (WNCL). She signed a one-year deal with the Sydney Sixers in 2017; however, injury prevented her from making a WBBL appearance.

Iemma was born in Beverly Hills, Sydney. She is the eldest child of former Labor politician Morris Iemma, who served as premier of New South Wales from 2005 to 2008.
