= Wes Davoren =

Australian politician

Westby James "Wes" Davoren (5 August 1928 – 21 September 2010) was an Australian politician. He was a Labor member for Lakemba in the New South Wales Legislative Assembly from 1984 to 1995.

Davoren was born in Campsie, New South Wales, and was educated at Sydney Technical High School. He was a senior production planner with the State Rail Authority and director of a co-operative building society and credit union before entering politics. He was president of the Punchbowl branch of the Labor Party 1970–84 and secretary of the Lakemba State Electoral Committee 1965–84.

In 1984, the Labor member for Lakemba, Vince Durick, retired and Davoren was selected as his replacement. He won the seat easily, but was only narrowly successful in 1988. Davoren retired in 1995, the seat going to Tony Stewart.

Davoren died on 21 September 2010 at the age of 82.

== Parliamentary activities ==
During his time in the New South Wales Legislative Assembly, Davoren served as Deputy Opposition Whip in 1991. He also participated in parliamentary debates concerning housing, transport, education and industrial relations. On 5 December 1991, he introduced the Summary Offences (Prostitution) Amendment Bill, which proposed changes to legislation concerning street prostitution. The bill was intended to address concerns raised in his electorate and neighbouring areas.

New South Wales Legislative Assembly
Preceded by Vince Durick	Member for Lakemba; 1984–1995	Succeeded by Tony Stewart
