= Morris Iemma =

Premier of New South Wales from 2005 to 2008

The Honourable Morris Iemma AO
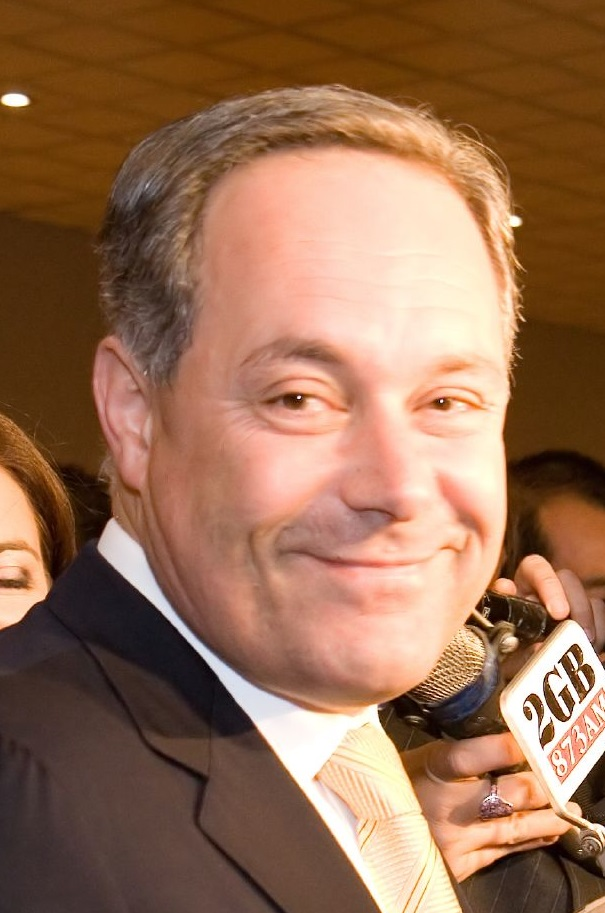
- Iemma in 2007

40th Premier of New South Wales
- In office 3 August 2005 – 5 September 2008
- Monarch: Elizabeth II
- Governor: Marie Bashir
- Deputy: John Watkins
- Preceded by: Bob Carr
- Succeeded by: Nathan Rees
- Constituency: Lakemba
Ministerial offices 1999–2008
Minister for Citizenship
In office 3 August 2005 – 5 September 2008
Premier	himself
Preceded by	Bob Carr
Succeeded by	Virginia Judge
Minister for State Development
In office 17 February 2006 – 2 April 2007
Premier	himself
Preceded by	John Watkins
Succeeded by	Ian Macdonald
Treasurer of New South Wales
In office 3 August 2005 – 17 February 2006
Premier	himself
Preceded by	Andrew Refshauge
Succeeded by	Michael Costa
Minister for Health
In office 2 April 2003 – 3 August 2005
Premier	Bob Carr
Preceded by	Craig Knowles
Succeeded by	John Hatzistergos
Minister for Sport and Recreation
In office 21 November 2001 – 2 April 2003
Premier	Bob Carr
Preceded by	John Watkins
Succeeded by	Sandra Nori (as Minister for Tourism and Sport and Recreation)
Minister Assisting the Premier on Citizenship
In office 8 April 1999 – 2 April 2003
Premier	Bob Carr
Preceded by	new title
Succeeded by	John Hatzistergos
Minister for Public Works and Services
In office 8 April 1999 – 2 April 2003
Premier	Bob Carr
Preceded by	Ron Dyer
Succeeded by	Craig Knowles (as Minister for Infrastructure and Planning)
Constituencies 1991–2008
Member of the New South Wales Legislative Assembly for Lakemba
In office 27 March 1999 – 19 September 2008
Preceded by	Tony Stewart
Succeeded by	Robert Furolo
Member of the New South Wales Legislative Assembly for Hurstville
In office 25 May 1991 – 5 March 1999
Preceded by	Guy Yeomans
Succeeded by	seat abolished

Personal details
- Born: 21 July 1961 (age 65) Sydney, New South Wales, Australia
- Party: Labor Party
- Spouse: Santina Raiti (m. 1997)
- Children: 4, including Clara Iemma
- Education: Narwee Boys' High School; University of Sydney; University of Technology, Sydney
- Profession: Union official and adviser

Morris Iemma (/ˈjɛmə/; born 21 July 1961) is an Australian former politician who was the 40th Premier of New South Wales, serving from 3 August 2005 to 5 September 2008.

From Sydney, Iemma attended the University of Sydney and the University of Technology, Sydney. A member of the Labor Party, he was first elected to the Parliament of New South Wales at the 1991 state election, having previously worked as a trade union official. From 1999, Iemma was a minister in the third and fourth ministries led by Bob Carr. He replaced Carr as premier and Leader of the New South Wales Labor Party in 2005, following Carr's resignation. Iemma led Labor to victory at the 2007 state election, albeit with a slightly reduced majority. He resigned as premier in 2008, after losing the support of caucus, and left parliament shortly after, triggering a by-election. He was replaced as premier by Nathan Rees.

== Background ==
Iemma was born in Sydney, the only child of Giuseppe and Maria Iemma, migrants from Martone, Calabria, Italy. Maria Iemma worked in the clothing trade, and Giuseppe Iemma, a communist supporter in Italy, worked as a machine labourer. Morris joined the Labor Party when he was 16. He was educated at state schools in Sydney, including the now-closed Narwee Boys' High School, and has an economics degree from the University of Sydney and a law degree from the University of Technology, Sydney.

In 1997, Iemma married Santina Raiti, with whom he has four children. The couple's eldest child, Clara, is a cricketer.

Iemma is a member of the dominant right-wing faction of the New South Wales branch of the Australian Labor Party. From 1984 to 1986 he was an official with the Commonwealth Bank Employees Union. He then worked as an adviser to Senator Graham Richardson who held the environment and social security portfolios in the Bob Hawke and Paul Keating federal governments.

Iemma is a keen supporter of the St. George Illawarra Dragons in the NRL. He also supports the Sydney Swans in the AFL.

== Parliamentary career ==
=== Member for Hurstville ===
Iemma contested the seat of Liberal-held seat of Hurstville at the 1991 New South Wales state election. He was elected to the New South Wales Legislative Assembly with the slogan "A local who listens," defeating the sitting member for Earlwood, Phil White. In his first term, he served on the Regulation Review Committee and served for eleven months as a member of the Joint Select Committee upon the Constitution (Fixed Term Parliament) Bills.

He was re-elected in 1995 and was appointed as a Parliamentary Secretary in the Carr Government. Initially assisting the Attorney General and Minister for Industrial Relations, Jeff Shaw, he was appointed Parliamentary Secretary assisting the Premier, Bob Carr in 1997. When the seat of Hurstville was abolished in 1999, he won a tough pre-selection battle for the safe seat of Lakemba, which included part of the old seat of Hurstville. Iemma would hold Lakemba until his resignation in 2008.

=== Carr Government Minister ===
Following the 1999 election, Iemma was appointed Minister for Public Works and Services and Minister Assisting the Premier on Citizenship in the Carr ministry. He added the portfolio of Minister for Sport and Recreation in 2001. He held the three portfolios until the 2003 election.

In 2003, he was appointed as Minister for Health. His tenure as Health Minister was generally free of major controversy, although he has said of the Health portfolio: "it is one of the biggest and most difficult jobs in government".

== Premier ==
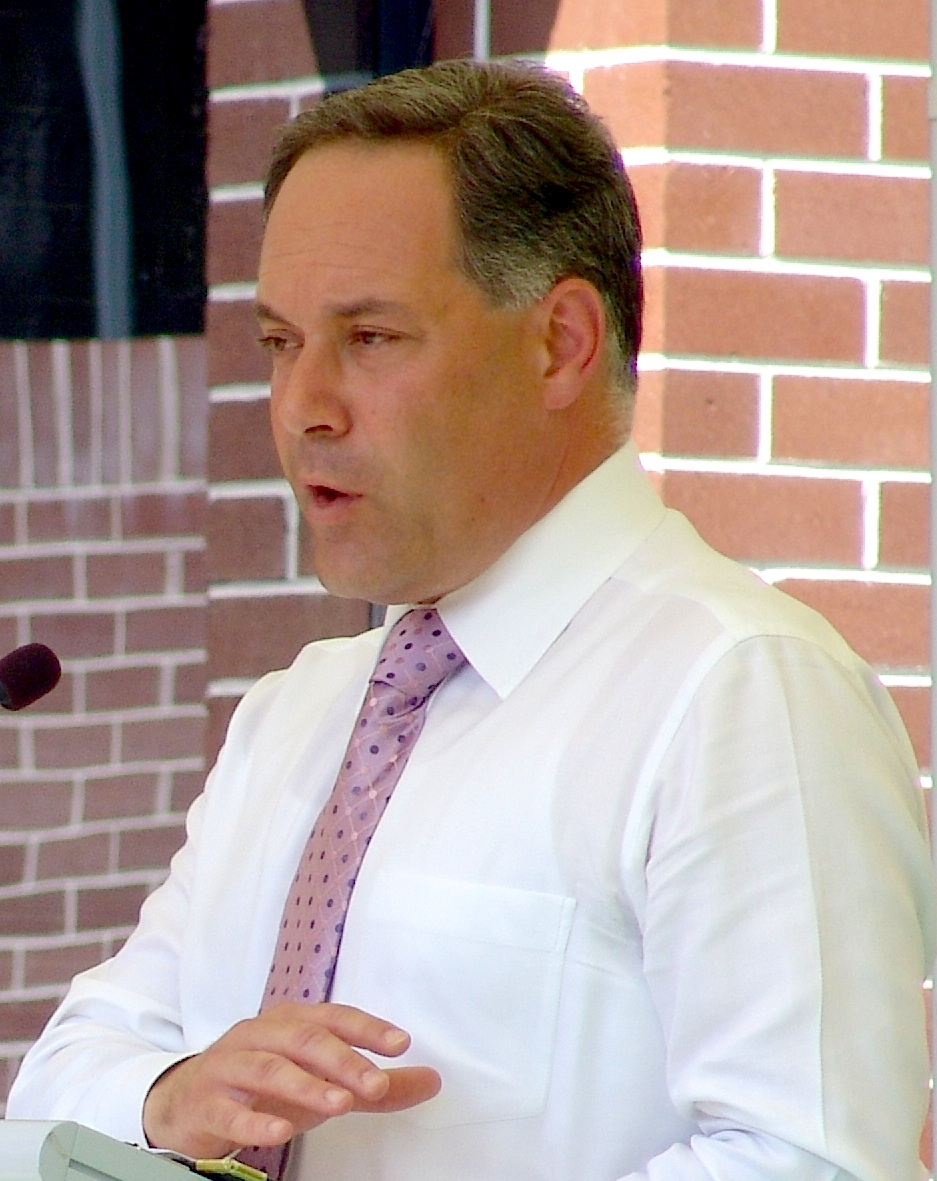
Iemma in 2006

=== First ministry ===
When Bob Carr announced his intention to retire as New South Wales Premier on 3 August 2005, Iemma immediately announced his candidacy to succeed him as leader of the NSW Labor Party and thus as Premier. Police Minister Carl Scully was also a candidate, but on 29 July he withdrew. Iemma was the only candidate when the Labor Caucus met on 2 August to elect a new leader. He was formally appointed by Professor Marie Bashir, the Governor of New South Wales, on 3 August.

Iemma immediately faced a number of resignations. Deputy Premier and Treasurer Andrew Refshauge, and senior minister Craig Knowles, once considered a potential leader himself, both declared they would leave politics. Iemma took the Treasury portfolio for himself. Among his first policy moves as new Premier, Iemma announced the immediate repealing of the vendor tax (a tax on investment property) that was introduced by the Carr government in 2003.

Opinion polls in August showed that Labor under Iemma's leadership was maintaining the lead over the Liberal opposition it had enjoyed under Carr, despite Iemma's relatively low profile. His short-term position was improved by the sudden resignation of Liberal leader John Brogden. This was seen in the results of the by-elections on 17 September caused by the resignation from Parliament of Carr, Refshauge and Knowles. Labor retained all three seats - Maroubra (Carr's seat) very easily, Macquarie Fields (Knowles's seat) comfortably, despite a substantial swing to the Liberals, and Marrickville (Refshauge's seat) despite a strong challenge from the Greens. In Marrickville, where the Labor candidate was Education Minister Carmel Tebbutt (switching from the Legislative Council), the Labor primary vote increased in the absence of a Liberal Party candidate.

Despite its relatively short term in office, the Iemma Government faced significant service delivery problems in transport, health care and future water supplies. Sydney newspapers consistently asserted that Iemma's government was more interested in "spin" than policy development. Other embarrassments beset his premiership. For example, in February 2006, while awaiting the start of a COAG media conference in Canberra, while chatting to Victorian Premier Steve Bracks and not realising cameras were operating, Iemma was recorded as saying:

"Today? This fuckwit who's the new CEO of the Cross City Tunnel has ... been saying what controversy? There is no controversy."

Nevertheless, in the months leading up to his first election as Labor leader, he maintained a comfortable lead in various opinion polls and was re-elected in the March 2007 election. Labor was returned with 52 seats compared to 35 for the Coalition.

=== Second ministry ===
On 15 July 2007, after several failures on the NSW rail system, Iemma claimed that the government was at war with rail unions. In November 2007 the Iemma government lifted the ban on genetically modified canola production and started the process of privatising the state's electricity system. On 3 May 2008, the New South Wales ALP's State Conference rejected, by 702 to 107 votes, the Iemma government's plans to privatise the state's electricity system.

== Resignation and post-political career ==
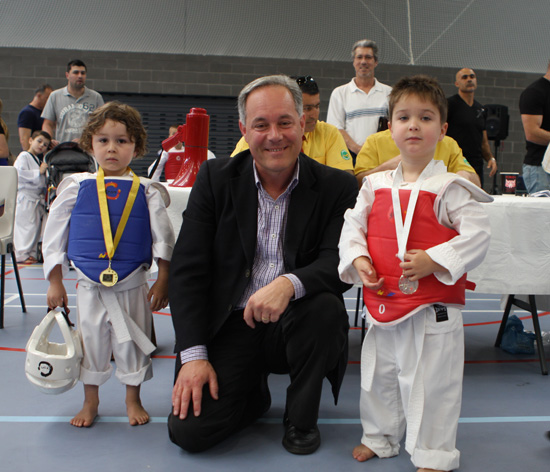
Iemma in 2011

On 5 September 2008, Iemma announced his resignation as Premier after losing the support of his caucus faction over the details of a proposed cabinet reshuffle sparked by the resignation of Deputy Premier John Watkins. Iemma had proposed that five other Ministers also depart, including Treasurer Michael Costa and Health Minister Reba Meagher. Iemma's faction, Centre Unity, supported the sacking of the Treasurer but not the other four Ministers. Faced with this rejection, Iemma resigned. The caucus unanimously selected Nathan Rees as Premier in his stead.

Iemma resigned from parliament on 19 September 2008, ending his 17-year political career, and forcing a by-election in the seat of Lakemba, won by Robert Furolo.

In May 2009, Iemma was admitted to hospital suffering from an acute brain inflammation—viral meningitis. As a result, he lost movement in his legs and underwent physiotherapy with the goal of recovering full use of his legs. Iemma has served as chair of the South Eastern Sydney Local Health District Board since 1 January 2011 and on the boards of the Cancer Institute NSW and the Sydney Cricket & Sports Ground Trust.

In January 2013, there was speculation that Iemma was considering standing for the Division of Barton in the Australian House of Representatives for Labor at the 2013 federal election to replace former Attorney-General Robert McClelland who on that day announced that he would be retiring from parliament after 17 years. Iemma, however, decided not to contest the preselection in Barton, and the preselection instead went to Steve McMahon.

In November 2012 and March 2014 Iemma was called before the NSW Independent Commission Against Corruption (ICAC) in relation to allegations of corrupt behaviour by Eddie Obeid regarding a dispute between Australian Water Holdings and Sydney Water; and in relation to allegations of corrupt behaviour by Ian Macdonald and Obeid regarding the issuing of lucrative mining licences near Bylong. Both Obeid and Macdonald were found by ICAC to have acted in a corrupt manner regarding the issuing of mining licences and criminal charges were laid.

In 2015, Iemma sought preselection to contest Barton at the 2016 Australian federal election. Barton was ultimately contested and won by Iemma's former caucus colleague Linda Burney.

In 2016, a reform panel was set up following allegations by the ABC's Four Corners program of wrongdoing in the industry and premier Mike Baird's reversal of his choice to ban the industry. In 2017, Iemma was appointed chair of the reconstituted Greyhound Racing NSW board.

In 2019, Iemma began a lobbying business called Iemma Patterson Premier Advisory.

In July 2023, Iemma was appointed as the chair of Venues NSW. However, he resigned from the role in August due to health issues and was replaced by David Gallop.

== Honours ==
The Morris Iemma Indoor Sports Centre, named in honour of Iemma and operated by the City of Canterbury-Bankstown in partnership with the YMCA NSW, is a modern sports facility that caters for a variety of indoor sports, including netball, basketball, soccer and volleyball as well as incorporating a gym, change rooms, cafeteria and childcare services. The facility was opened in March 2011.

Iemma was appointed an Officer of the Order of Australia in the 2026 King's Birthday Honours in recognition of "distinguished service to the people and Parliament of New South Wales, particularly as Premier, to the not-for-profit sector, and to community sport".

New South Wales Legislative Assembly
Preceded by Guy Yeomans	Member for Hurstville; 1991–1999	District abolished
Preceded by Tony Stewart	Member for Lakemba; 1999–2008	Succeeded by Robert Furolo
Political offices
New title	Minister Assisting the Premier on Citizenship; 1999–2003	Succeeded by John Hatzistergos
Preceded by Ron Dyer	Minister for Public Works and Services; 1999–2003	Post abolished
Preceded by John Watkins	Minister for Sport and Recreation; 2001–2003	Succeeded by Sandra Nori as Minister for Tourism, Sport and Recreation
Preceded by Craig Knowles	Minister for Health; 2003–2005	Succeeded by John Hatzistergos
Preceded by Bob Carr	Premier of New South Wales; 2005–2008	Succeeded by Nathan Rees
Preceded by Andrew Refshauge	Treasurer of New South Wales; 2005–2006	Succeeded by Michael Costa
Preceded by Bob Carr	Minister for Citizenship; 2005–2008	Succeeded by Virginia Judge
Preceded by John Watkins	Minister for State Development; 2006–2007	Succeeded by Ian Macdonald
Party political offices
Preceded by Bob Carr	Leader of the New South Wales Labor Party; 2005–2008	Succeeded by Nathan Rees
