= Robert Furolo =

Australian politician

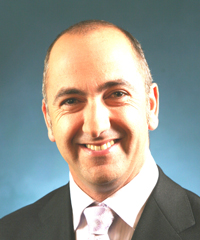

Member of the New South Wales Legislative Assembly for Lakemba
- In office 18 October 2008 – 6 March 2015
- Preceded by: Morris Iemma
- Succeeded by: Jihad Dib

Personal details
- Born: Robert Anthony Furolo; 27 July 1969 (age 57) Sydney, New South Wales, Australia
- Party: Labor Party

Robert Anthony Furolo (born 27 July 1969) is an Australian politician. He was a Labor Party member of the New South Wales Legislative Assembly from 2008 to 2015, representing the electorate of Lakemba.

Furolo was born in Sydney, and grew up in its outer western suburbs. He worked in the transport industry after leaving school, working as a McDonald's manager for a period, before returning to university to study economics and industrial relations. He was appointed as an advisor to his local MLA, member for Hurstville and future Premier Morris Iemma in 1994. He worked for Iemma for nine years, remaining on his staff after his appointment as a minister in 1999, before leaving to work as a public relations consultant in 2003.

== Political career ==
Furolo was elected to the City of Canterbury council in 1999, and served a stint as its deputy mayor before standing for mayor in the 2004 election. He won that election, and was re-elected in 2008, recording one of the few swings to the Labor Party in an election where the party faced widespread losses across the state.

One week before his re-election as mayor, on 5 September 2008, Iemma resigned as Premier, resulting in widespread speculation that he would resign as the member for Lakemba. After delaying an announcement for two weeks, Iemma announced on 19 September that he would indeed retire; a move reportedly attributed to his efforts to see Furolo, his preferred choice, endorsed as his successor. Furolo subsequently won Labor preselection for what had been Labor's safest seat in the state, and easily won the seat, polling more than 58% of the primary vote, despite a 15-point swing against Labor. He was sworn in as a member of the Legislative Assembly on 18 October, and as a member of the Legislative Review Committee on 30 October. He was involved in a minor car accident in 2010.

Civic offices
Preceded by Kayee Griffin	Mayor of Canterbury; 2004–2011	Succeeded by Brian Robson
New South Wales Legislative Assembly
Preceded by Morris Iemma	Member for Lakemba; 2008–2015	Succeeded by Jihad Dib
