= Stan Wyatt =

Australian politician

Personal details
- Born: 3 April 1894 Maitland, New South Wales
- Died: 26 July 1964 (aged 70) Randwick, New South Wales
- Party: Labor Party

Stanislaus Wyatt (3 April 1894 – 26 July 1964) was an Australian politician and a member of the New South Wales Legislative Assembly from 1950 until his death in 1964. He was a member of the Labor Party (ALP).

Wyatt was born in West Maitland and was the son of a labourer. He was educated in Maitland and worked as a clerk with the New South Wales Government Railways before becoming an official of the Australian Railways Union. He served in the First Australian Imperial Force and was wounded twice in Belgium. Wyatt was a member of the socialization units of the ALP and was expelled from the party in 1938. However, he was reinstated in the 1940s and was elected to the parliament as the Labor member for Lakemba at the 1950. He defeated the incumbent Independent Labor member Fred Stanley. Stanley had been expelled from the party and dis-endorsed for breaking caucus solidarity during an indirect election of the Legislative Council. Wyatt retained the seat for the Labor Party at the next 4 elections and was in office at the time of his death. Wyatt was the party whip between 1959 and 1964 but did not hold any other party, parliamentary or ministerial office.

New South Wales Legislative Assembly
Preceded by Fred Stanley	Member for Lakemba; 1950 – 1964	Succeeded by Vince Durick
