= Malek Fahd Islamic School =

Islamic school in Sydney, Australia

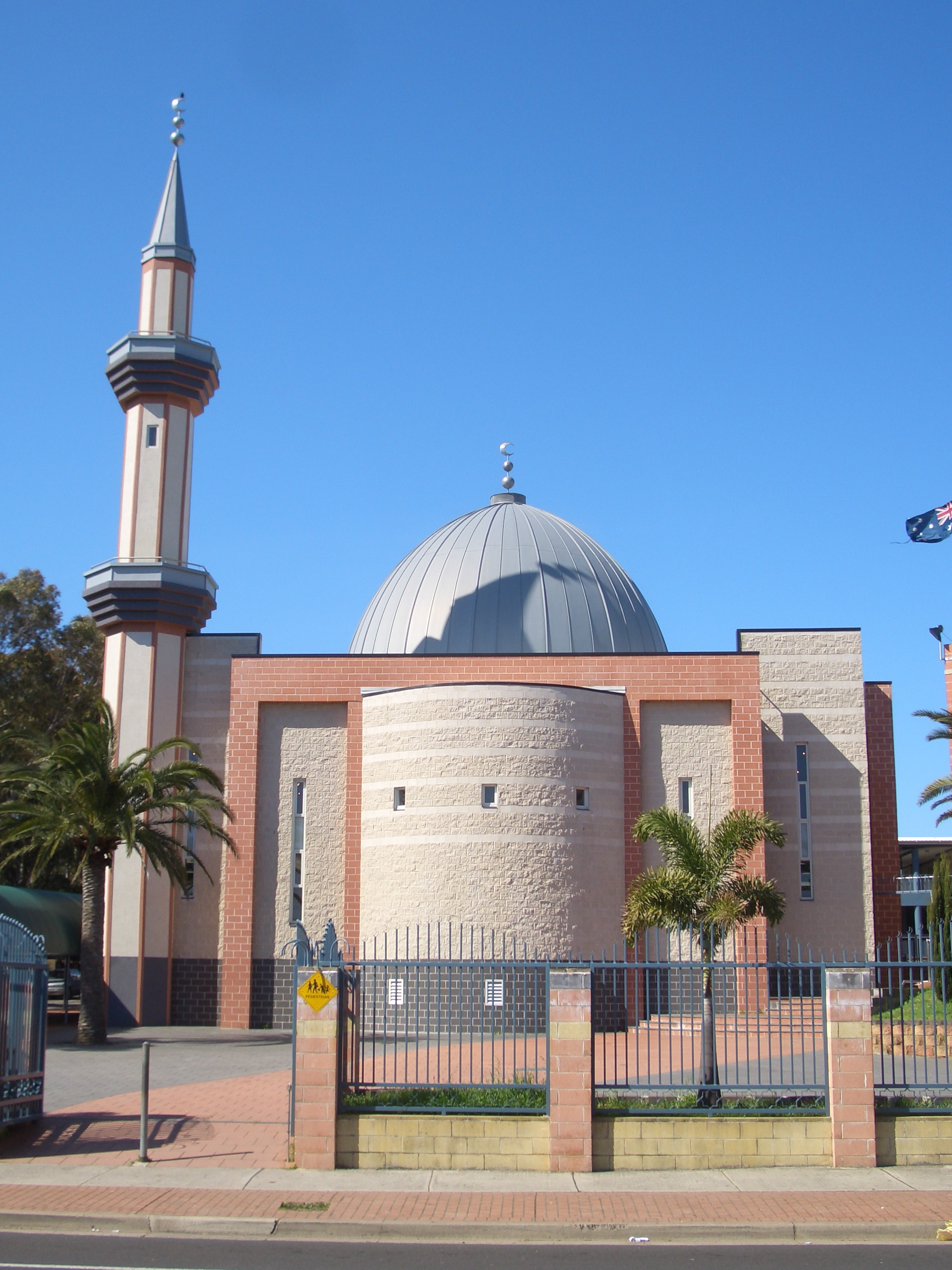
- A minaret and mosque located at Malek Fahd Islamic School

Location
- 405 Waterloo Road, Greenacre, Sydney, New South Wales; Australia; 33°53′29″S 151°03′39″E

Information
- Type: Independent co-educational primary and secondary day school
- Motto: Knowledge is Light, Work is Worship
- Denomination: Islamic
- Established: 1989; 37 years ago
- Educational authority: NSW Department of Education
- Oversight: Australian Federation of Islamic Councils (1989–2016)
- Staff: 175
- Teaching staff: 151
- Years: K–12
- Age: 5 to 18
- Enrolment: 2,440 (2013)
- Campuses: Greenacre (main, K–12); Hoxton Park (K–4); Beaumont Hills (K–7)
- Colours: Green, yellow and white
- Website: mfis.nsw.edu.au

Malek Fahd Islamic School (abbreviated as MFIS) is a multi-campus independent Islamic co-educational primary and secondary day school, with its main campus located in the south-western Sydney suburb of Greenacre with smaller campuses in Hoxton Park and Beaumont Hills, New South Wales, Australia.

After Al-Faisal College, Malek Fahd Islamic School is the second largest Islamic school in Australia, that caters for 2,444 students from Kindergarten to Year 12 across three campuses. All MFIS students (and 80% of the staff) are Muslim.

== History ==
Malek Fahd Islamic School was opened in October 1989 with one campus in Greenacre. The purchase of the land for the school was secured through a $12 million gift from King Fahd of Saudi Arabia. The school started with 87 students from kindergarten to year 3 but has grown to over 2,000 students in 2013.

In 2007 the school made its debut when it came 9th in the state's HSC ranking.

In April 2011 the school established two campuses in Hoxton Park and Beaumont Hills, both catering for students in early primary school.

In June 2013 the School Board, chaired by Tom Alegounarias, appointed the school's first Christian headmaster, Ray Barrett.

By 2016 the school's state ranking for the HSC had dropped to 76th.

== Campuses ==
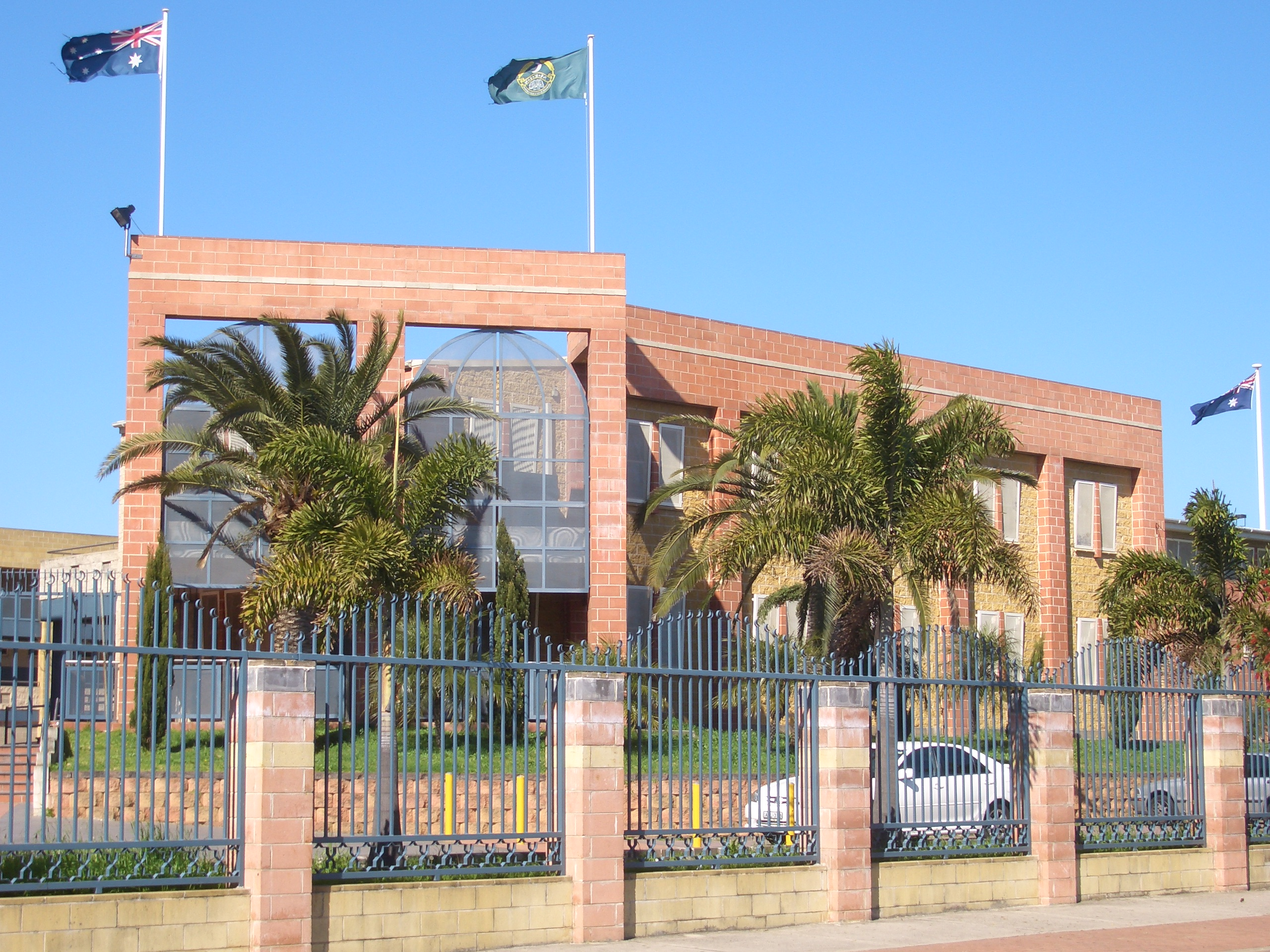
Greenacre campus

The school's main campus in Greenacre includes 1070 students in the primary school (Kindergarten to Year 6) and 990 students in the secondary school (Years 7 to 12). Students in the main campus originate mainly from the local Bankstown area, Lakemba, Auburn and Guildford.

The Hoxton Park campus opened in April 2011 for 78 students in Kindergarten and Years 1 and 2 as well as 4 staff. In 2013 the campus has 87 students enrolled from Kindergarten to Year 4. The campus has a modern two-story building which caters for students from Hoxton Park, Liverpool, Lurnea, Hinchinbrook and Prestons.

The school also operates a campus in Beaumont Hills, opened in April 2011, for children in Kindergarten, Year 1 and Year 2. The campus initially started with 31 students but has increased in size with over 200 students in 2012 from Kindergarten to Year 6. In 2014 the school expanded to include Year 7. The campus draws students from Beaumont Hills, Kellyville, Castle Hill, The Ponds, Blacktown, Seven Hills, Rooty Hill and Mount Druitt.

== Curriculum ==
Malek Fahd Islamic School teaches according to the NSW Board of Studies mandated syllabuses. However all students are required to study the Religious Education syllabus throughout their schooling. The school also teaches Arabic throughout schooling. Arabic is also offered as a subject for students completing the Higher School Certificate in Year 11 and 12. In 2013 NSW Education Minister Adrian Piccoli expressed grave concern at the school's HSC curriculum.

The school also offers a number of sporting and extra curricular activities including with other schools and local organisations.

== Controversies ==
In 2008, Malek Fahd Islamic School was criticised for not allowing under performing students to sit for the Higher School Certificate (HSC), resulting in unfairly high HSC results reported for the school. The school denied distorting exam results. After it came to light that poorer performing students from the school were compelled to enrol in TAFE so that their marks would not "drag down" the school's overall performance, Intaj Ali withdrew his students from TAFE and claimed that it had actually been part of the school's extra-curricular activities that the students enrolled at TAFE. But a former HSC co-ordinator at Bankstown TAFE registered that the parents of students were dismayed by having to pay fees to both the school and then more fees at TAFE. Intaj Ali also claimed that the school had increased the range of HSC subjects it offered. However, the subject offerings at the school remained limited and continued to disadvantage students who would excel in the social, rather than natural, sciences.

In spite of denials by the school the case of Afyouni in 2011 demonstrated that the school was still manipulating its ranking by outsourcing the poorer performing students to TAFE even after it had been exposed for the first time in 2008.

In 2010, the Australian Federation of Islamic Councils received $5.2 million from Malek Fahd Islamic School which is approximately one third of the money received from the federal and state governments. In 2012 the NSW government demanded the repayment of $9 million passed from Malek Fahd Islamic School to the Australian Federation of Islamic Councils.

In November 2013, the school faced closure due to problems associated with its attendance-approvals, its HSC curriculum, educational quality, safe environment and its buildings. In December 2013 the school won a reprieve, with the NSW Board of Studies agreeing to a further year of registration. Three years later, in 2011, the school expelled a student because his academic performance was "deemed insufficient". It was reported in 2015 that the school commenced legal proceedings for unpaid tuition fees against the student's parents. The amount outstanding was reported to be less than A$500.

In November 2015 the school sought an injunction in the NSW Supreme Court to remove the governance of the Australian Federation of Islamic Councils. In March 2016, the school cut ties to the Australian Federation of Islamic Councils. In September 2016, initiated civil proceedings against the Australian Federation of Islamic Councils in the Supreme Court of New South Wales for damages as the result of a breach of fiduciary duty and for above-market rents.

=== Federal funding ===
In February 2016, the Commonwealth Government revoked $19 million in federal funding to the school. The decision was made after an investigation found that the school had been operating for profit and that there were ongoing governance concerns. It was reported that the "feud" between the school board and the Australian Federation of Islamic Councils had escalated to the point where security was required at the school for "fear it could escalate into violence". The federal government investigation revealed phantom loan, mystery payments and undeclared conflicts of interest were identified by a federal government investigation. On 3 April 2016, following a request by the school, an internal review conducted by the Federal Department of Education upheld the initial decision to revoke funding.

An appeal by the school to the Administrative Appeals Tribunal was dismissed on 23 December 2016, with the tribunal upholding the Federal Government's decision to revoke funding. The school published a statement indicating that they would appeal to the Federal Court of Australia.

An appeal of the Administrative Appeal Tribunal's decision to uphold the Federal Government's revocation of funding was dismissed by the full bench of the Federal Court of Australia on 20 March 2018. A lawyer representing the school at the Federal Court criticized the financial interactions between the school and the Federation of Islamic Councils, saying there had been, "a toxic combination of directors common to the board of AFIC and the school". The school's legal team indicated that they would consider an appeal to the High Court of Australia. The school will continue to operate during the appeal process.

On 15 June 2020, the school was ordered by the government to repay $11 million after falsely claiming to be not-for-profit to receive government funding, as they were in-fact operating for-profit. This was on top of a $4 million debt it is already paying off after the school was found to be in breach of the same policy from 2010 to 2012.

=== Skaf gang rape psychologist ===
In July 2019, it was revealed that Joanna Natalie Senior, a former prison psychologist who was fired for having a relationship with a Skaf gang rapist, and who married another member of the notorious child rape gang (led by Bilal Skaf), was working with children as a school counsellor at Malek Fahd.

== See also ==
- Education in Australia
- Islam in Australia
- List of Islamic schools in New South Wales
- List of things named after Saudi kings
