= List of Islamic schools in New South Wales =

This is a list of Islamic schools that operate within the Australian state of New South Wales. Entry to these schools is managed by each school individually, with religion being a primary criterion. Some schools (such as Malek Fahd Islamic School) may be selective in addition to being an Islamic School.

School	Suburb or Town	M/F/Co-ed	Founded
Al Hikma College	Lakemba	Co-ed	2012
Al Noori Muslim School	Greenacre	Co-ed	1983
Al Sadiq College	Yagoona	Co-ed	2002
Al Zahra College	Arncliffe	Co-ed	1998
Al-Faisal College	Auburn	Co-ed	1998
Al-Faisal College	Minto	Co-ed	2006
Al-Faisal College	Liverpool	Co-ed	2015
Amity College (formerley Sule College)	Shellharbour	Co-ed	1999
Amity College (formerley Sule College)	Prestons	Co-ed	1995
Amity College (formerley Sule College)	Auburn	Co-ed	2001
Arrahman College	Austral	Co-ed	2022
Arkana College	Auburn	Co-ed	1960
Australian Islamic College of Sydney (formerly King Abdul Aziz College)	Mount Druitt	Co-ed	1997
Australian International Academy (formerly King Abdul Aziz College)	Kellyville	Co-ed	2013
Bellfield College	Rossmore	Co-ed	2008
Irfan College	Cecil Park	Co-ed	2013
Iqra Grammar College	Minto	Co-ed	2006
Malek Fahd Islamic School	Greenacre	Co-ed	1989
Minarah College	Green Valley	Co-ed	2002
Muslim Girls Grammar School	Granville	F	2021
My Dream Australian Academy	Auburn	Co-ed	2023
New Madinah College	Young	Co-ed	2017
Risslah College	Bankstown	Co-ed	1998
Risslah College	Liverpool	Co-ed	1998
Salamah College	Chester Hill	Co-ed	2012
Unity Grammar College	Austral	Co-ed	2008
Western Grammar School	Plumpton	Co-ed	2012
Zahra Grammar School	Minto	Co-ed	2018

== See also ==
- List of Islamic schools in Australia
