= Matw =

Matw or MATW may refer to:

- Mad at the World, or MATW, a Christian rock band from Southern California
- Madman Across the Water, an album by Elton John
- MATW (charity), Muslims Around the World charity founded by Ali Banat
- Me Against the World, an album by Tupac Shakur
