= Eucalyptus × beyeri =

Scientific classification
- Kingdom: Plantae
- Clade: Tracheophytes
- Clade: Angiosperms
- Clade: Eudicots
- Clade: Rosids
- Order: Myrtales
- Family: Myrtaceae
- Genus: Eucalyptus
- Species: E. × beyeri

Binomial name
- Eucalyptus × beyeri L.A.S.Johnson & K.D.Hill

Species of eucalyptus

Eucalyptus × beyeri is a hybrid species of tree that is endemic to New South Wales, Australia. It was originally given the name Eucalyptus paniculata var. angustifolia by George Bentham who published the description in Flora Australiensis. Bentham noted that William Woolls had given it the common name narrow-leaved iron-bark. In 1917, Richard Thomas Baker raised the variety to species status with the name Eucalyptus beyeri. In 1990, Lawrie Johnson and Ken Hill suggested that Bentham's type specimen was a hybrid between a previously undescribed species and E. crebra. They gave the previously undescribed species the name Eucalyptus beyeriana. This interpretation is accepted by the Australian Plant Census but not universally, and Eucalyptus beyeri is still listed in the Flora of Australia.
