= Dean Matterson =

Australian rugby league footballer

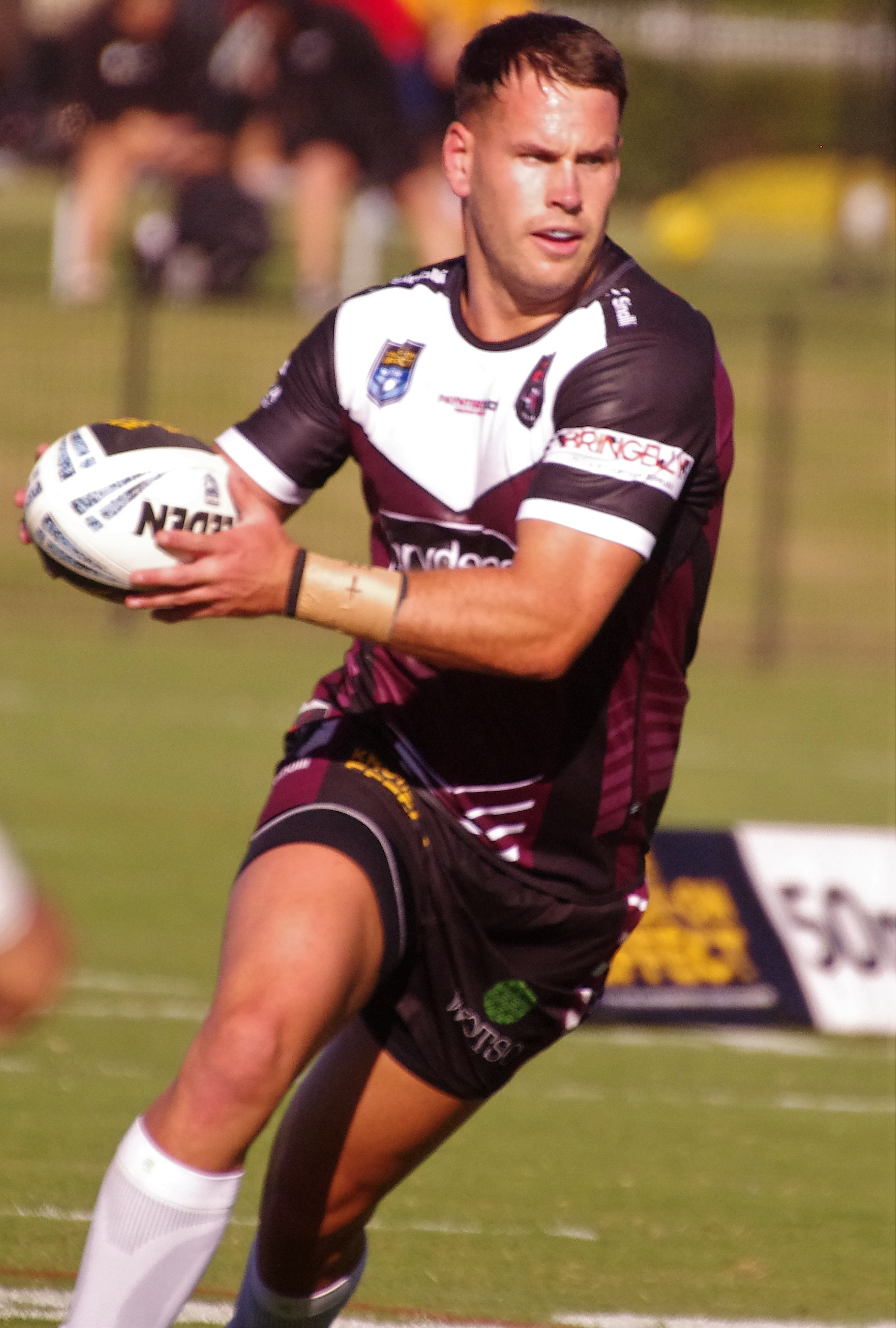

Personal information
- Born: 20 November 1997 (age 28) Greenacre, New South Wales, Australia
- Height: 190 cm (6 ft 3 in)
- Weight: 95 kg (14 st 13 lb)

Playing information
- Position: Second-row, Lock, Five-eighth
Club
Years	Team	Pld	T	G	FG	P
2023	Manly Sea Eagles	7	1	0	0	4
2026–-	RC Albi	20	5	2	0	24
	Total	27	6	2	0	28
- Source: As of 9 September 2025
- Relatives: Ryan Matterson (brother); Terry Matterson (uncle)

Dean Matterson (born 20 November 1997) is an Australian professional rugby league footballer for RC Albi in the French top league the Super XIII as a second-row forward , he used to play for the Manly-Warringah Sea Eagles in the NRL.

== Background ==
He is the younger brother of Parramatta Eels Lock forward Ryan Matterson.

Matterson played for the Parramatta Eels in Holden Cup for the 2016 and 2017 seasons, he played as a Five-eighth. In 2018, Matterson moved to the Sydney Roosters where he played NSW Cup for the Roosters feeder club the Wyong Roos. Halfway through the 2018 season, Matterson moved to the Blacktown Workers.In 2022, Matterson signed with Manly for the 2023 season.

=== 2023 ===
In round 20 of the 2023 NRL season, Matterson made his first grade debut for Manly against the North Queensland Cowboys in a 19-8 loss at Brookvale Oval, scoring a try. Matterson played seven games in his debut season. On 25 September, Matterson signed a two year extension with the club until the end of 2025.

=== 2024 & 2025 ===
Matterson made no appearances for Manly in the 2024 NRL season. He would instead play for the clubs feeder team in the NSW Cup which was Blacktown Workers Sea Eagles. Matterson again failed to feature for Manly in the 2025 NRL season. On 8 September 2025, Matterson was released by Manly after not being offered a new contract.
