= Unity Grammar College =

Location
- 70 Fourth Avenue; Austral, New South Wales; Australia; 33°56′38″S 150°48′11″E

Information
- Type: Independent co-educational primary and secondary day school
- Motto: Our Children Today, Our Leaders Tomorrow
- Denomination: Islamic
- Established: 2008; 18 years ago
- Principal Grade 7-12: Sam Halbouni
- Principal Grade K-6: Hibba Mourad
- Years: K–12
- Colours: Light blue, blue, navy blue
- Website: www.unitygrammar.com.au

Unity Grammar is an independent Islamic co-educational primary and secondary day school. It is located in Austral, New South Wales, a suburb in south-western Sydney, Australia. The school educates students from Kindergarten to Year 12.

== Islamic Studies and Arabic ==
The Islamic Studies Curriculum class provides a K–10 Islamic education program specifically designed to meet the needs of Australian Muslim students. The Curriculum reflects Unity Grammar's aims and objectives in providing a balanced Islamic education.

The college has developed its own K–10 Arabic program with a complete series of K–10 Arabic textbooks. The program aims to enable students to recognise the relationship between language and culture and appreciate social, geographical, and historical contexts.

By utilising multiple sources of classical texts and modern Arabic teaching resources, the program was developed with reference to the Arabic K–10 Syllabus and in accordance with the broad learning outcomes of the K–10 Curriculum Framework set by the New South Wales Education Standards Authority (NESA).

== Extracurricular ==
Students analyse ideas presented in class activities to assist in illustrating how the knowledge and understanding of STEM. The STEM initiative has hosted a series of events representing projects involved in STEM education. Unity Grammar is currently a Regional and National Robotics Finalist as well as a competitor in the Robotics World Finals.

== See also ==
- Education in Australia
- Islam in Australia
- List of Islamic schools in New South Wales
