= Norfolk Reserve, Greenacre =

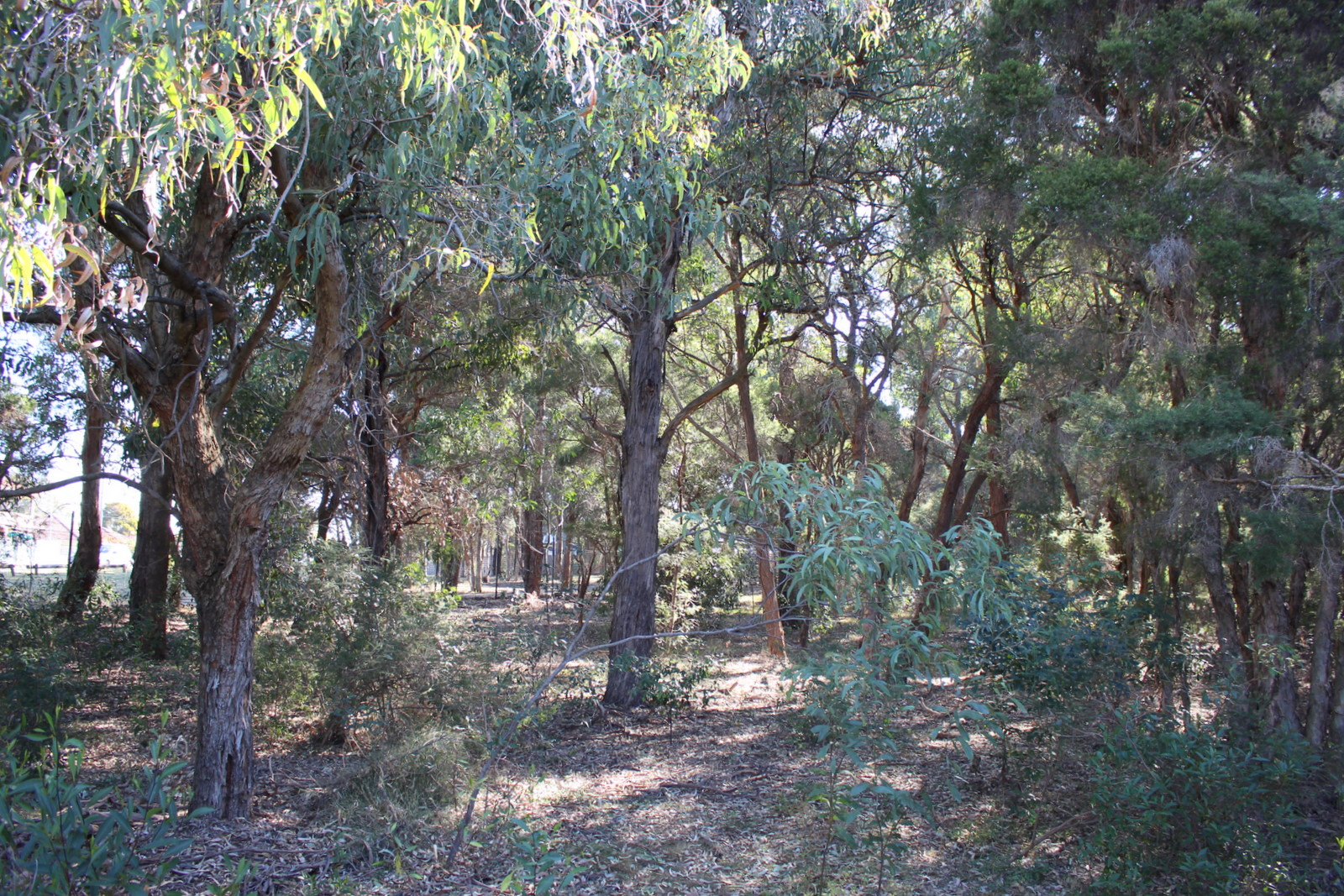

- Coordinates: 33°53′36.28″S 151°03′45.91″E
- Country: Australia
- State: New South Wales
- Website: Norfolk Reserve, Greenacre

Norfolk Reserve

Norfolk Reserve is a bushland reserve located in suburban Greenacre, 14 km (9 mi) from the centre of Sydney, Australia surrounded by the Chullora Railway Workshops and urban sprawl. Listed rare species of plants recorded in this reserve include the downy wattle and the vine Vincetoxicum woollsii.

== Geography ==
Average annual rainfall is 930 mm (37 in). Soils are relatively infertile, based on Triassic sedimentary rocks, the soil base consists of Bringelly shale. Average monthly annual maximum temperatures for nearby Bankstown range between 17.5 for July and 27.7 for January. Average monthly annual minimum temperatures range from 3 for July and 18 for February. Frosts are seldom recorded in winter. Temperatures in summer occasionally exceed 40 degrees C. Prevailing summer winds are easterly to south-easterly, winter winds are westerlies.

== History ==
The local indigenous Australian people were the Bidjigal group of the Darug people. Norfolk Reserve is a part of land that was acquired by the Urban Transit Authority in 1948. A bus depot opened in 1958. The bushland was left purposely, due to lobbying by the community group.Bankstown Bushland Society and to act as a buffer between the depot and surrounding residential areas.

== Flora ==
The area is a dry forest. Eucalyptus species present include Woollybutt, Broad leaf Ironbark, grey box and Beyers Ironbark. Occasionally paperbarks form the canopy (Melaleuca nodosa and Melaleuca decora).

164 indigenous plants have been recorded in this small area. The forest classification is Cooks River Clay Plain Scrub Forest, listed as an endangered ecological community in 1995. Less than 1% of the original area of this community currently exists in the form of a number of small remnants such as Norfolk Reserve.

== Fauna ==
This small forest reserve has few indigenous vertebrate species. However, Bearded dragons and small lizards (skinks) have been recorded. Previously, the rare regent honeyeater (Xanthomyza phrygia) and the Bent-wing Bat (Miniopterus schreibersii) have been recorded nearby. Norfolk Reserve may provide some habitat for these species if they occur nearby today. The White-throated needletail may be seen in the skies above in summer.

== Bush regeneration ==
Forest conservation work is in progress. Weeds include Blackberry (Rubus fruticosus). Paddy's (Sida rhombifolia), Bidens (Bidens pilosa), Fleabane (Conyza sp.), most of which are currently under control. However, the grass Ehrharta erecta remains troublesome. The general health of the vegetation is fair to good. The southern part of the reserve is in particularly good condition, with few weeds.
