= Terry Matterson =

Australian RL coach and former rugby league footballer

Personal information
- Born: 4 March 1967 (age 59) Auburn, New South Wales, Australia

Playing information
- Position: Lock, Five-eighth
Club
Years	Team	Pld	T	G	FG	P
1985–87	Eastern Suburbs	10	0	1	0	2
1988–95	Brisbane Broncos	156	29	314	0	744
1995–98	London Broncos	74	23	116	6	330
	Total	240	52	431	6	1076
Representative
Years	Team	Pld	T	G	FG	P
1989	New South Wales	1	0	0	0	0

Coaching information
Club
Years	Team	Gms	W	D	L	W%
2005–11	Castleford Tigers	148	58	4	86	39
2017	Gold Coast Titans	2	0	0	2	0
	Total	150	58	4	88	39
Representative
Years	Team	Gms	W	D	L	W%
2013–14	United States	6	3	0	3	50
- Relatives: Dean Matterson (nephew); Ryan Matterson (nephew)

Terry Matterson (born 4 March 1967) is an Australian rugby league coach and former professional rugby league footballer. Matterson played in Australia's premiership for the Eastern Suburbs Roosters and the Brisbane Broncos, and was also selected to play in the State of Origin for New South Wales once in 1989. He was a goal-kicking lock and he played the majority of his club football for the Brisbane Broncos, with whom he won the 1992 and 1993 premierships, in addition to stints with the Eastern Suburbs Roosters and the London Broncos. He worked as a head coach in the Super League for the Castleford Tigers between 2005 and 2011. From October 2013 Matterson was the head coach of the United States.

== Background ==
Matterson was born in Auburn, New South Wales, Australia.

== Playing ==
After playing at five-eighth for the Eastern Suburbs Roosters, Matterson moved to Brisbane to be part of the Broncos' inaugural 1988 team. Playing at lock and being the team's goal-kicker, Matterson scored 24 points in the Broncos' first ever match in the opening round of 1988 against the previous year's premiers, the Manly-Warringah Sea Eagles. This would stand as the record for most individual points in a Broncos game for over fourteen years. In 1989 Matterson represented New South Wales in the State of Origin, playing against many of his Broncos' teammates. He was also named player of the series for the 1989 Panasonic Cup tournament.

Matterson went on to play in the Broncos' inaugural grand final victory in 1992. In the weeks following the grand final he travelled with the Broncos to England, where he played at lock forward in the 1992 World Club Challenge against British champions Wigan, putting in a man-of-the-match performance to help Brisbane become the first NSWRL club to win the match in Britain. Matterson helped Brisbane to their second consecutive premiership in 1993, scoring a try in the Grand Final against St George.

Matterson joined the London Broncos in 1995. At the time he was the Brisbane club's top point-scorer, as well as record-holder of most points scored in a single match.

During the 2007 season at the Brisbane Broncos' 20-year anniversary celebration, the club announced a list of the 20 best players to play for them to date which included Matterson. Matterson also was inducted into the Brisbane Broncos official Hall of Fame.

== Coaching ==
Following his retirement as a player, Matterson expressed an interest in coaching. He was added to the coaching staff at the Brisbane Broncos ahead of the 2000 NRL season, after he missed out on the head coaching role at the Redcliffe Dolphins. The following season he would be appointed the coach of Brisbane Broncos feeder club, the Toowoomba Clydesdales in the Queensland Cup, replacing Ivan Henjak.

Midway through the 2001 season, Matterson took over as coach of the Norths Devils, taking over from Mark Murray who moved to the Melbourne Storm. After leading the Devils deep into the Queensland Cup finals during the 2002 season, Matterson was overlooked by Melbourne for the vacant head coaching role after Murray was sacked in favour of Craig Bellamy. He then took an assistant coaching role at the Canberra Raiders, after declining an offer to be Bellamy's assistant at Melbourne.

He then coached English Super League club the Castleford Tigers from 2005. Matterson expressed interest in taking over from Wayne Bennett as coach of the Brisbane Broncos at the end of the 2008 NRL season. Matterson stayed with the Castleford Tigers after they were relegated in 2006. He guided the team straight back up to regain its place in the Super League. Matterson then signed a new three year deal to stay at the Castleford Tigers. Matterson guided the Castleford Tigers to seventh place in Super League 2009. The club's first play-off finish since 2002. They faced Wigan Warriors at the DW Stadium and lost 18–12 with Joe Westerman scoring 8 points.

Pressure grew on Matterson during 2010 after the Castleford Tigers lost to Barrow Raiders at home in the Challenge Cup. Several hundred supporters gathered at the back of the main stand and vented frustration at Matterson and the club's board. Matterson and the team went on a rough patch but turned it around and only just missed out on a second play-off appearance in two years by losing out to St. Helens in the final league game of the season. Matterson hoped to improve the Castleford Tigers further in 2011 which would be his last season with the club. In 2011, Matterson was named as the assistant coach of the Exiles, a team made up of Australian and New Zealand players contracted to Super League clubs. The Exiles played against the England in June 2011 in the Rugby League International Origin Match, a fixture that is intended to become an annual contest in the future. Matterson will be assisting the Head coach of the RL Exiles, Brian McClennan. Matterson announced on 4 July 2011 that it would be his last season at the Castleford Tigers and he would leave the club at the end of that year. This took him to six years at the Castleford Tigers. Matterson returned to Australia to become an assistant coach of the North Queensland Cowboys for 2012. For their 2013 Rugby League World Cup campaign, the United States appointed Matterson as coach for the tournament.

== Career stats ==
=== NRL ===
Season	Team	Appearances	Tries	Goals	Goal-kicking percentage	Field goals	Points
1986 NSWRL Season	Eastern Suburbs Roosters	2	-	1/1	100%	-	2
1987 NSWRL Season	Eastern Suburbs Roosters	6	-	-	-	-	-
1988 NSWRL Season	Brisbane Broncos	20	8	59/92	64.13%	-	150
1989 NSWRL Season	Brisbane Broncos	20	5	42/64	65.63%	-	104
1990 NSWRL Season	Brisbane Broncos	22	3	23/38	60.53%	-	58
1991 NSWRL Season	Brisbane Broncos	18	-	38/59	64.41%	-	76
1992 NSWRL Season	Brisbane Broncos	23	2	74/108	68.52%	-	156
1993 NSWRL Season	Brisbane Broncos	24	7	58/89	65.17%	-	144
1994 NSWRL Season	Brisbane Broncos	17	3	18/35	51.43%	-	48
1995 ARL Season	Brisbane Broncos	11	1	2/3	66.67%	-	8

== Personal life ==
Matterson has a son named Charlie Matterson.

In January 2010, Matterson lost his left ring finger in a training accident where his wedding ring snagged on a fence. Surgery to re-attach the finger was unsuccessful, however Matterson seemed unaffected by the trauma, continuing to coach the Castleford Tigers the next week. His older brother Greg Matterson became the head coach of NSW Cup side Newtown Jets. Matterson is the uncle of Parramatta Eels' Ryan Matterson.
