= Ryan Matterson =

Australian rugby league footballer

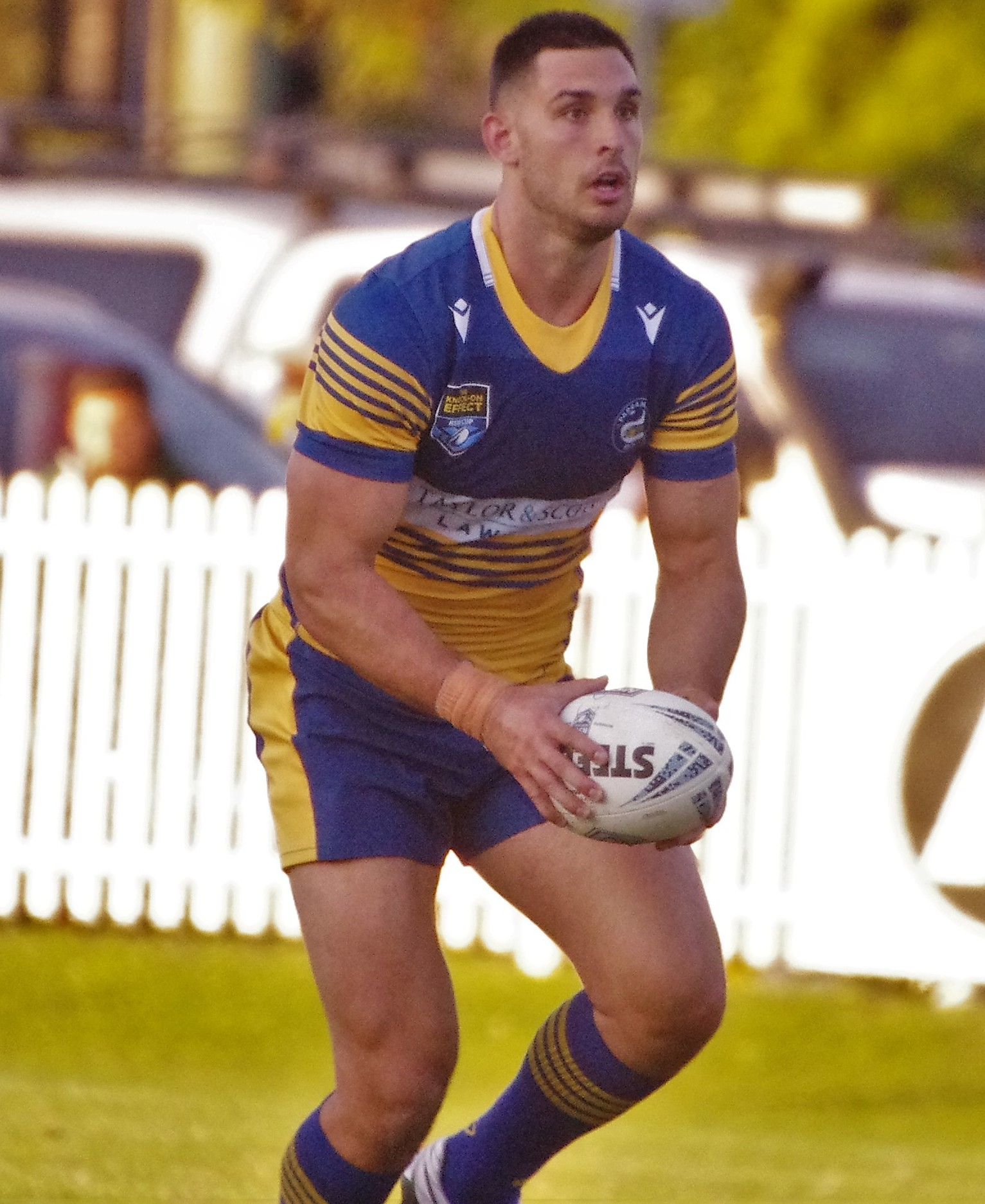

Personal information
- Born: 13 October 1994 (age 32) Greenacre, New South Wales, Australia
- Height: 191 cm (6 ft 3 in)
- Weight: 105 kg (16 st 7 lb)

Playing information
- Position: Second-row, Lock, Five-eighth
Club
Years	Team	Pld	T	G	FG	P
2016–18	Sydney Roosters	60	10	0	0	40
2019	Wests Tigers	24	5	0	0	20
2020–26	Parramatta Eels	97	11	0	0	44
2025(loan)	→ Warrington Wolves	8	0	0	0	0
	Total	189	26	0	0	104
Representative
Years	Team	Pld	T	G	FG	P
2016–18	City Origin	2	1	0	0	4
2022	New South Wales	1	0	0	0	0
- Source: As of 12 November 2026
- Education: St Pauls Catholic College
- Relatives: Dean Matterson (brother); Terry Matterson (uncle)

Ryan Matterson (born 13 October 1994) is an Australian former professional rugby league footballer who last played as a loose forward for the Warrington Wolves in the Super League.

He previously played in the National Rugby League (NRL) for the Sydney Roosters, with whom he won the 2018 NRL Grand Final, the Wests Tigers, and the Parramatta Eels. Matterson has also played for the City Origin side and New South Wales. A versatile player, Matterson primarily played as a second-row forward but started in every position except fullback and wing throughout his career.

== Background ==
Matterson was born in Greenacre, New South Wales, Australia, and was educated at St Pauls Catholic College, Greystanes, graduating in 2012. He is the nephew of former Sydney Roosters and Brisbane Broncos player Terry Matterson.

Matterson played his junior rugby league for the Wentworthville Magpies and Bankstown Bulls, before being signed by the Sydney Roosters.

== Playing career ==
=== Early career ===
From 2012 to 2014, Matterson played for the Parramatta Eels' NYC team. In 2014, he captained the side.

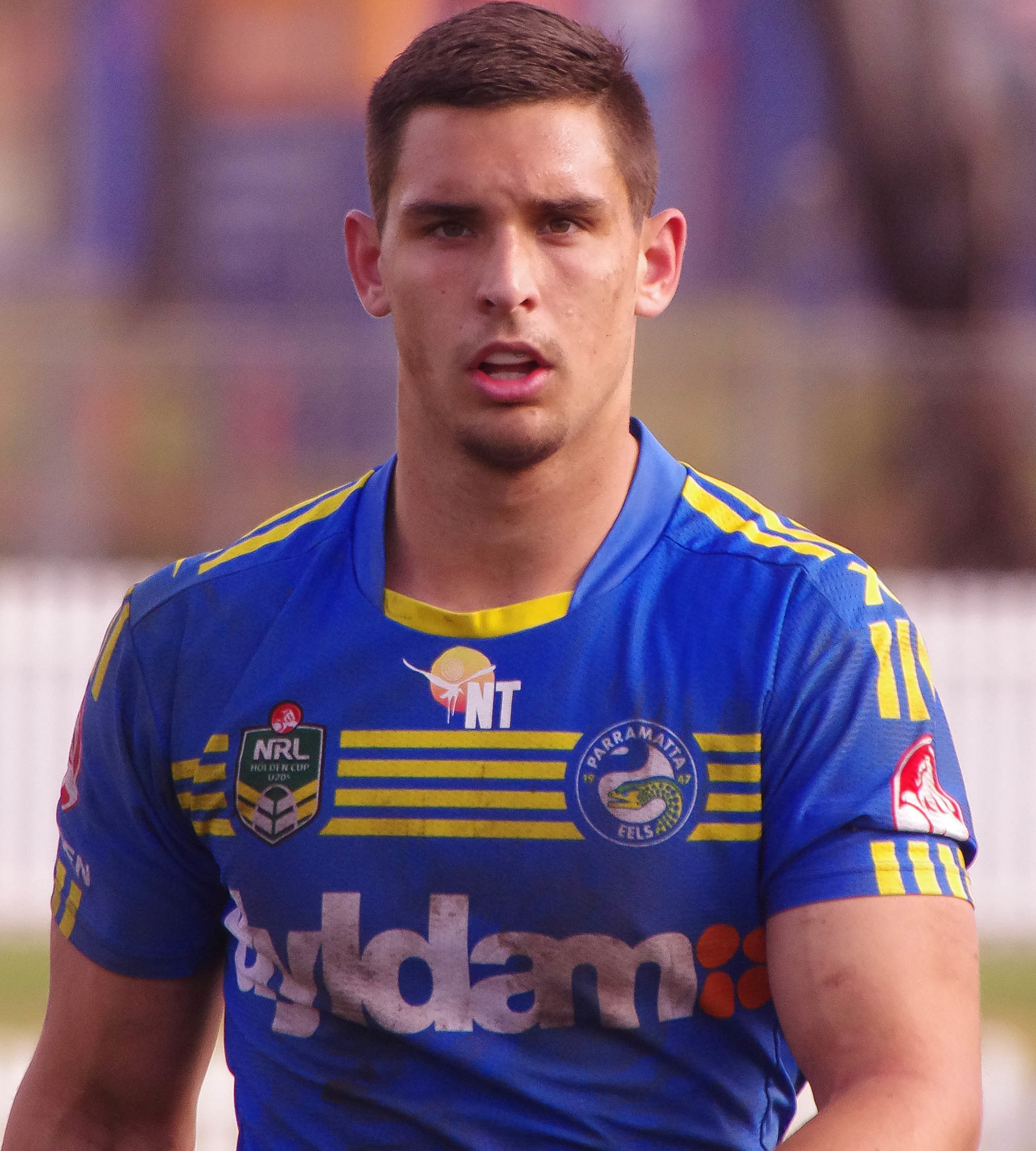
Matterson playing for Parramatta in 2014

On 3 May 2014, he played for the New South Wales under-20s team against the Queensland under-20s team. On 26 June 2014, he re-signed with the Eels on a 3-year contract. On 18 October 2014, he played for the Junior Kangaroos against the Junior Kiwis. In 2015, he graduated to Eels' New South Wales Cup team, Wentworthville Magpies. In August 2015, he signed a two-year contract with the Sydney Roosters starting in 2016.

=== 2016 ===
In round 8 of the 2016 NRL season, Matterson made his NRL debut for the Roosters against the St. George Illawarra Dragons, scoring a try. On 8 May, he played for NSW City against NSW Country, after just two NRL appearances, playing at centre and taking an intercept to set up a try, before scoring one himself in the second half of City's 44-30 victory.

=== 2017 ===
Matterson made 23 appearances for the Sydney Roosters in 2017 as the club fell short of a grand final appearance losing to North Queensland in the preliminary final 29-16.

=== 2018 ===
In 2018, Matterson was part of the Roosters which won their 4th minor premiership in six years. On 30 September, Matterson played in Easts 21-6 victory over Melbourne in the 2018 NRL grand final. This would be the final appearance for Matterson as an Eastern Suburbs player as he had signed a three-year deal to join the Wests Tigers starting in 2019.

=== 2019 ===
Matterson made his debut for the Wests Tigers in round 1 of the 2019 NRL season against Manly-Warringah at Leichhardt Oval.

Matterson scored his first try for the club in round 4 against Penrith which the Wests Tigers lost 9-8.

Matterson made a total of 24 appearances for the club in the 2019 NRL season as they finished ninth and missed out on the finals. On September 19, Matterson was granted leave from training for the final part of the year for personal reasons.

Having been granted a release from the Wests Tigers on October 31, Matterson then signed a three-year deal with the Parramatta Eels, his junior club, on November 7.

=== 2020 ===
On 3 February, Matterson spoke to the media for the first time since joining Parramatta and apologised publicly to supporters of the Wests Tigers club saying "To all the fans out there I'm sorry for how it happened, I do say sorry to them and I understand their frustrations but it was kind of out of my control, "I don't sign contracts to purposefully want to leave. Something did happen at the Tigers, and I'm sorry that happened so with the intention of signing with Parramatta, I do want to stay here permanently and long-term and really enjoy my football. I was frustrated when it was perceived [to be] about money. It wasn't. That just wasn't the case".

Matterson made his debut for Parramatta in round 1 of the 2020 NRL season against arch rivals Canterbury-Bankstown. Parramatta would go on to win the match 8-2.

In round 5, Matterson scored the winning try for Parramatta as the club defeated Penrith 16-10. The result saw Parramatta win their first five games of the year which was their best start to a season since 1986.

In round 11, Matterson faced his former club Wests Tigers for the first time since departing them under bitter circumstances. Early in the first half, he was taken from the field with concussion after being knocked out attempting a tackle on Wests player Russell Packer. Matterson took no further part in the match as Parramatta won 26-16.

At the end of the 2020 regular season, Parramatta finished in third place and qualified for the finals. Matterson played in both finals matches where the club lost to Melbourne and South Sydney.

=== 2021 ===
In round 2 against Melbourne, Matterson was taken from the field with concussion after being elbowed in the head by Melbourne player Felise Kaufusi. As a result, Matterson missed the following five matches.

In round 22 against Manly, Matterson was sent off for high contact to the head of Brad Parker during Parramatta's 56-10 loss. On 16 August, Matterson was suspended for three matches in relation to the tackle. Matterson missed the first week of the finals due to his suspension but returned for Parramatta's semi-final against Penrith which Parramatta lost 8-6 ending their season.

=== 2022 ===
In round 9 of the 2022 NRL season, Matterson scored the winning try for Parramatta in their 22-20 victory over Penrith at Penrith Park. It was Penrith's first loss of the season and also the first time the club had lost at the ground since 2019. On 29 May, Matterson was selected by New South Wales to play off the bench in game one of the 2022 State of Origin series. On 18 June, it was announced that Matterson had signed a four-year contract extension to remain at Parramatta until the end of 2026. The following day, Matterson was left out of the New South Wales squad for game two against Queensland. Matterson played 23 games for Parramatta in 2022 including their Grand Final loss Penrith at Stadium Australia.

On 5 October, Matterson elected to serve a three-game suspension for a crusher tackle on Penrith player Dylan Edwards rather than pay a $4,000 fine. Matterson explained his reasons behind taking the ban saying “I just feel that $4,000 is pretty hefty considering I have already paid close to $4,000 in fines this year for things that are absurd,” Matterson said, At the end of the day I have personal things I need to worry about outside of rugby league. I just didn't think it was warranted. If you do something wrong at work. They don't take money off you. It's always hard. I love playing. It's something I spoke to the club about before I made the decision. Obviously it's a hard one, but I have personal reasons I need to take into consideration". Matterson then explained his frustration at Penrith's Jarome Luai avoiding sanctions after he kicked Parramatta player Isaiah Papali'i saying “Considering Jarome Luai is kicking players and he didn't get cited. It makes you think ‘Where is this game heading?".

=== 2023 ===
In round 4 of the 2023 NRL season, Matterson made his first start of the year in Parramatta's 17-16 golden point extra-time victory over Penrith. In round 12 against South Sydney, Matterson was taken from the field during the clubs upset victory with a calf injury and was ruled out for an indefinite period. Matterson played a total of 18 matches for Parramatta in the 2023 NRL season as the club finished 10th and missed the finals.

=== 2024 ===
Matterson played a total of 16 games for Parramatta in the 2024 NRL season as the club finished 15th on the table. There were reports that Matterson had been told by Parramatta officials he could negotiate with other clubs ahead of the 2025 NRL season, however the club later backflipped on this stance.

=== 2025 ===
At the start of the 2025 NRL season, Matterson found himself exiled from the first team with the introduction of new head coach Jason Ryles. Matterson managed only four appearances from the interchange bench throughout the year and was placed in the clubs reserve grade team. On 22 July, the Parramatta club confirmed that Matterson was released from the club to take up an opportunity overseas with Warrington on a loan deal. In round 20 of the 2025 Super League season, Matterson made his club debut for Warrington in their 20-16 loss against Leigh. Matterson played eight matches for Warrington towards the back end of the 2025 Super League season as the club finished 8th on the table.

=== 2026 ===
In August 2026, Matterson announced his retirement from the NRL after an ongoing battle with concussion symptoms.

== Statistics ==
Year	Team	Games	Tries	Pts
2016	Sydney Roosters	15	4	16
2017	Sydney Roosters	23	1	4
2018	Sydney Roosters	22	5	20
2019	Wests Tigers	24	5	20
2020	Parramatta Eels	19	3	12
2021	Parramatta Eels	17	4	16
2022	Parramatta Eels	23	4	16
2023	Parramatta Eels	18		
2024	Parramatta Eels	16		
2025	Parramatta Eels	4		
2025	Warrington Wolves (loan)	8		
	Totals	189	26	104
