= Ali Banat =

Australian humanitarian (1982–2018)

- Born: 16 February 1982; Sydney, New South Wales, Australia
- Died: 29 May 2018 (aged 36); Sydney, New South Wales, Australia
- Occupations: Businessman, philanthropist
- Years active: 2015-2018
- Known for: Muslim charity project "Muslims Around the World"
- Notable work: MATW Projects

Ali Banat (16 February 1982 – 29 May 2018) was an Australian businessman, later a humanitarian philanthropist, from the Sydney suburb of Greenacre and of Palestinian descent. He was running two successful businesses, a security company and an electrical company, when he was diagnosed with cancer in October 2015. After the cancer diagnosis, he donated everything he had for charitable causes.

== Muslims Around the World ==
After the diagnosis, he founded the charity 'Muslims Around the World', also known as MATW. An interview with Muslim preacher Mohamed Hoblos titled "Gifted with Cancer" brought further acclaim to his organization. The charity initially concentrated on Togo but soon expanded to other African nations including Burkina Faso, Ghana and Benin. He came to the aid of people living in destitute communities by constructing clean water infrastructure, educational facilities, community health and safety facilities, orphanages, battered women shelters, and other institutions essential for the prosperity of those communities. Importantly, Banat dedicated his efforts to uplifting Muslim life in these areas, renovating mosques and encouraging the Muslim people therein to come together in solidarity.

== Death ==
He was diagnosed with cancer in 2015 and died on 29 May 2018. He left a farewell video message.
