= Al-Faisal College =

Location
- 149 Auburn Road, Auburn, Inner West, Sydney, New South Wales; Australia; 33°51′24″S 151°01′53″E

Information
- Type: Independent co-educational primary and secondary day school
- Motto: Faith, Knowledge, Success
- Religious affiliation: Islamic
- Denomination: Sunni
- Established: 27 April 1998; 28 years ago
- Educational authority: NSW Department of Education
- Oversight: Australian Federation of Islamic Councils
- Principal: Safia Khan Hassanein
- Managing director: Sheikh Shafiq R. Abdullah Khan
- Years: K–12
- Age: 5 to 18
- Enrolment: 3669 across all three campuses (2013)
- Language: English
- Campuses: Auburn; Campbelltown; Liverpool
- Website: Official website

Al-Faisal College (AFC) is currently the largest Islamic school in Australia, with 9000+ students across all campuses, as of 2013. It is a quad-campus independent Islamic co-educational primary and secondary day school, with campuses in Auburn, Liverpool, Campbelltown. Operated by Al-Faisal College Ltd, the college was established at 1998, Auburn campus, and later expanded to the Campbelltown campus in 2013 and Liverpool campus in 2015. The college announced in 2020 that it will open a fourth campus in Lakemba, with construction to start late November 2020.

== History ==
The Auburn campus opened on 27 April 1998, with 200 students from kindergarten to Year 2. In 2007, the first cohort of Year 12 students completing the Higher School Certificate graduated from the college. Between 2008 and 2018, the school more than tripled in size, from approximately 860 students in 2008, to 2800 in 2018.

Al-Faisal College took over Iqra Grammar College at Minto, Campbelltown in 2013, with 440 students and 28 teaching staff, bringing the total enrolment to 1,660.

In August 2013, the college's deputy principal for Years 7 to 12, Peter Rompies, said that the school would likely not be able to cater for the 200 to 300 students on the "huge waiting lists" for 2014 kindergarten applications.

Al-Faisal College Liverpool opened its doors in Term 2 on 27 April 2015, with two classrooms operating out of demountable classrooms. In 2016, the school received a $750,000 grant from the state government to improve the facilities. New buildings are being built for further resources for their students.

== Campuses ==
=== Auburn ===
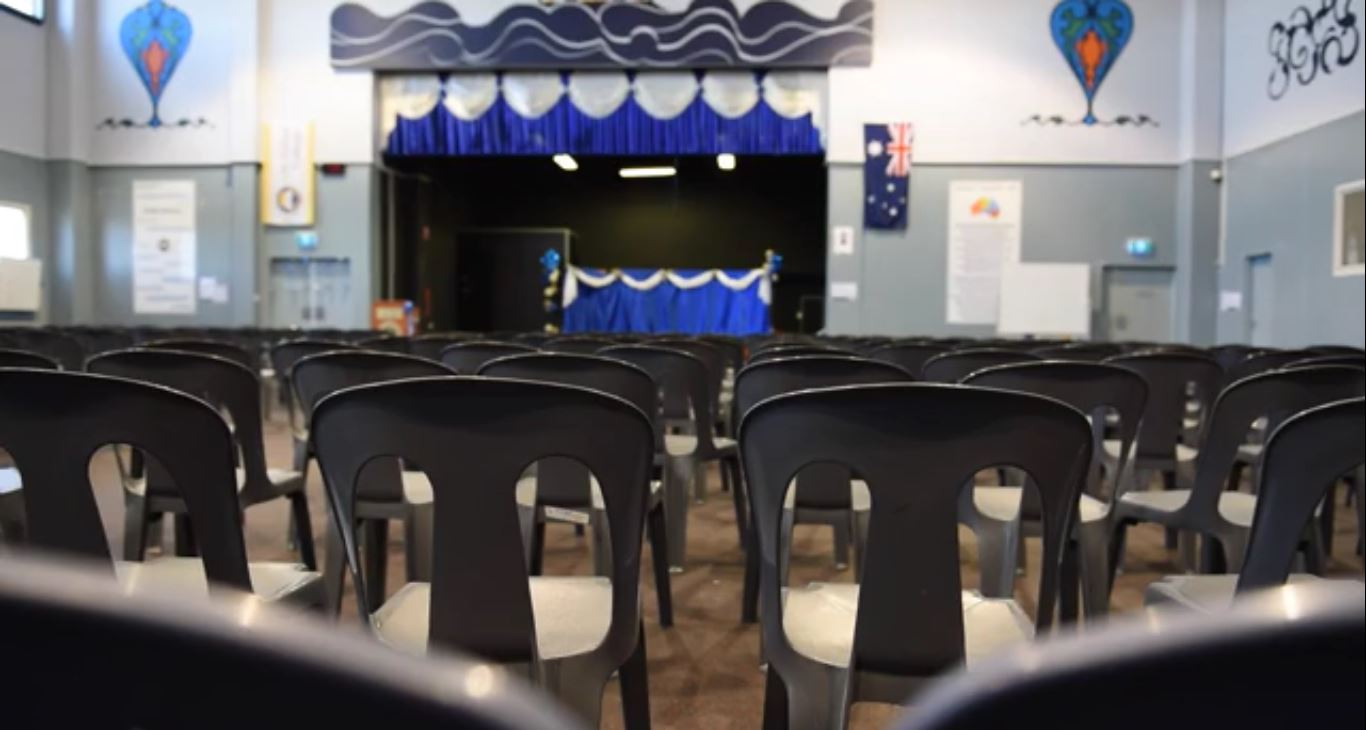
The Upper Hall at AFC, Auburn

The Auburn campus serves as the headquarters for the school and is the largest campus by number of students and staff. The campus has five buildings, denoted as Building A, B, C, D and E. Building A is for the primary school, while Buildings B and C are shared between primary and secondary students. Buildings D and E are used for secondary students.

The campus has two main playgrounds. One on the main ground level is covered and shaded. The second is located on the rooftops of all buildings, except Building A. The rooftop playground is fully netted and secured.

The campus only has one main multipurpose hall, known as the "Upper Hall" among the school community, and as the "Grand Hall" formally. The Hall has an open stage, with backstage spacing, a comprehensive sound system and a projector system set up on stage. The Hall is used for sporting, prayers and school functions such as graduations, formals and awards night.

=== Campbelltown ===
The Campbelltown campus started operating under Al-Faisal College management in 2013, previously being operated by Iqra Grammar School since 2006. The campus went through a revamp under Al-Faisal College and hence has expanded its facilities to include a multipurpose hall, a library and multiple computer and scientific labs which lack resources and funding to sufficiently work.

=== Liverpool ===
Al-Faisal College opened its doors to their third campus in Minto. Currently, the campus operates from K-12.

In 2020, Al-Faisal College announced their master plan for their Liverpool campus, which includes extending the existing campus and also creating another site for the school across the existing one, at 80 Gurner Avenue. This plan will create new facilities such as multipurpose halls, new play fields, extended library, and new classrooms. The plan will cater for over 5500 students and 200 staff, and will cost more than $300 million to construct. The master plan is said to go hand in hand with the overall transformation of the Liverpool area, which is slowly becoming a CBD in Western Sydney.

=== Lakemba ===
Al-Faisal College announced in early 2020 that a fourth campus will be constructed at 65 Croydon St, Lakemba. The campus will cater for 350 students from K-6 spread over a two-level building, with associated car parking and play areas. The campus was due to open in 2022.

== Curriculum ==
Al-Faisal College teaches according to the NSW Board of Studies, Teaching and Educational Standards-mandated syllabuses. Students from kindergarten to Year 12 study Arabic as a language other than English, and study the Quran and complete Islamic studies.

Students completing the Higher School Certificate at the college study Arabic and Islamic Studies, along with the compulsory subject English, and other subjects of their choosing.

Al-Faisal College increased its rank in the Higher School Certificate from 54th in 2017 to 15th in 2023.

Primary students are offered compulsory courses of English, Maths, Science, HSIE, PDHPE, and Creative Arts (including Music and Visual Arts).

== Controversies ==
=== Funding ===
The Muslim World League (MWL), founded by the late King of Saudi Arabia Faisal, is closely linked to Sheikh Shafiq Khan, the managing director of the al-Faisal College. The MWL provided funding to assist in the establishment of the college. While it has been reported that Khan's power rests on his close relationship with the Saudi Government and its Islamic Affairs Ministry, which uses the kingdom's wealth to promote its conservative view of Islam, in response Khan has said the Saudi funding of the school does not mean Saudis have control of, or influence on, the college's curriculum.

== See also ==
- Education in Australia
- Islam in Australia
- List of non-government schools in New South Wales
- List of Islamic schools in New South Wales
