= Greenacre, New South Wales =

Greenacre
- Suburb
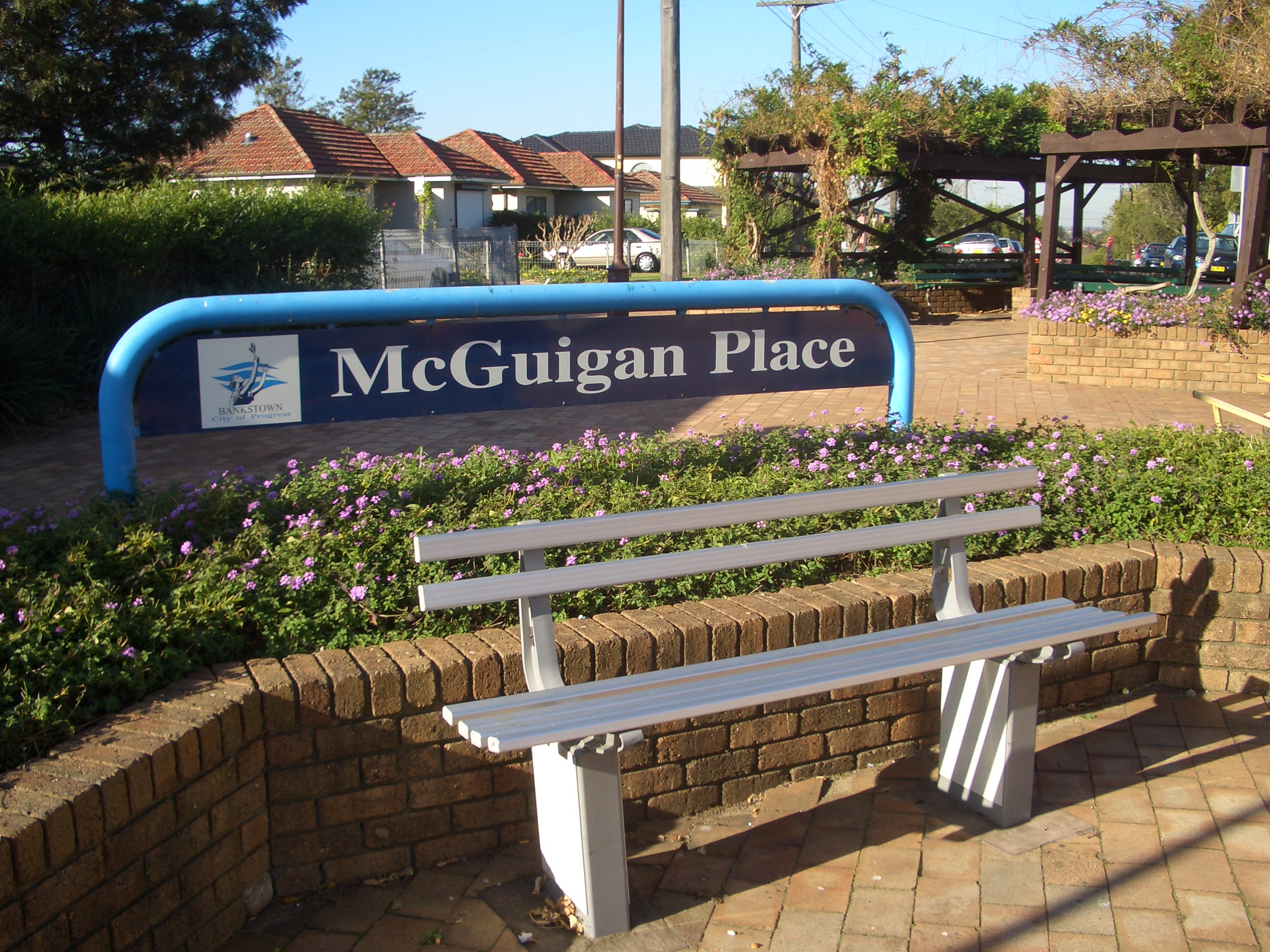
- McGuigan Place, Greenacre c. 2007

- Interactive map of Greenacre
- Country: Australia
- State: New South Wales
- City: Sydney
- LGAs: City of Canterbury-Bankstown; Municipality of Strathfield
- Location: 20 km (12 mi) west of Sydney CBD

Government
  - State electorate: Bankstown
  - Federal division: Watson
- Elevation: 33 m (108 ft)

Population
  - Total: 26,314 (2021 census)
- Postcode: 2190
Suburbs around Greenacre
Chullora	Rookwood	Strathfield South
Yagoona	Greenacre	Belfield, Belmore
Bankstown	Mount Lewis	Lakemba, Punchbowl

Greenacre is a suburb in Sydney, located 20 kilometres west of the Sydney central business district in the state of New South Wales, Australia. Most of Greenacre is in the local government area of the City of Canterbury-Bankstown, while a part in the east is in the Municipality of Strathfield.

== History ==
This area was previously known as East Bankstown. When the first road went through the area, an acre of land was cleared for cultivation. The contrast to its surrounding area led to it being referred to as the 'Green Acre'. In 1909, Greenacre Park Estate became one of the first subdivisions in the area. Michael Ryan operated an inn called the Harp of Ould Erin on land he owned to the north of Liverpool Road.

The eastern part of the suburb, east of Roberts Road and north of Juno Parade, was mostly part of the large logistical and industrial area surrounding Enfield Marshalling Yards, with a small residential area.

A separate part of the suburb, north of Liverpool Road (Hume Highway), is also railway and industrial land, and was added to Strathfield Council in 1892.

== Demographics ==
At the 2021 census, there were 26,314 residents in Greenacre. The median age was 33 years old and 23.9% of the population was aged 14 years and under. 52.9% of people were born in Australia. The most common other countries of birth were Lebanon 13.0%, Vietnam 2.2%, Bangladesh 1.8%, Pakistan 1.7% and Syria 1.5%. The most common ancestries were Lebanese 31.6%, Australian 13.4%, English 7.5%, Italian 4.2% and Chinese 4.2%. 26.7% of people spoke only English at home. Other languages spoken at home included Arabic 38.7%, Urdu 3.6%, Vietnamese 2.8%, Greek 2.7% and Bengali 2.6%. The most common responses for religion were Islam 46.8% and Catholic 20.3%.

== Commercial area ==
The suburb is distinctly but unofficially split into the north and the south. The southern parts of Greenacre are serviced by a strip of local independent shops and outlets along Waterloo Road and around the intersection of Juno Parade and Boronia Road. Businesses in the northern parts of Greenacre are often identified with neighbouring Chullora, such as Chullora Market Place.

== Transport ==
Buses operate to and from Strathfield station, Burwood station, Punchbowl station, Lakemba station and Bankstown station.

The eastern edge of Greenacre is defined by the Enfield Marshalling Yards and Punchbowl Road, the western limit is Rookwood Road and Stacey Street, the northern limit is Liverpool Road and Brunker Road, and the southern limit is Wattle Street. Other main roads through the suburb include Waterloo Road, Juno Parade, Boronia Road and Highview Avenue.

== Religion ==
Christian churches in Greenacre include: Good Shepherd Anglican Church (80 Pandora St), St John Vianney & St Thomas More Catholic Church, Greenacre Uniting Church, Greenacre Baptist Church, Greenacre Church of Christ, Sydney Full Gospel Korean Church, St John's Melkite Catholic Church.

Mosques and musallahs located in Greenacre include Khaled Ibn Al Walid Mosque, Boxing Club Masjid (or Brotherhood Boxn Centre) and Greenacre Musallah.

== Schools ==
Greenacre is the site of three public primary schools, Chullora Public School, Banksia Road Primary School and Greenacre Public School. Greenacre also has various private schools such as Greenacre Christian College, St John Vianneys Primary School, Holy Saviour Catholic School, Al Noori Muslim School, Malek Fahd Islamic School, An Nahyan Islamic School, Al Sadiq College and Sydney Full Gospel Church School.

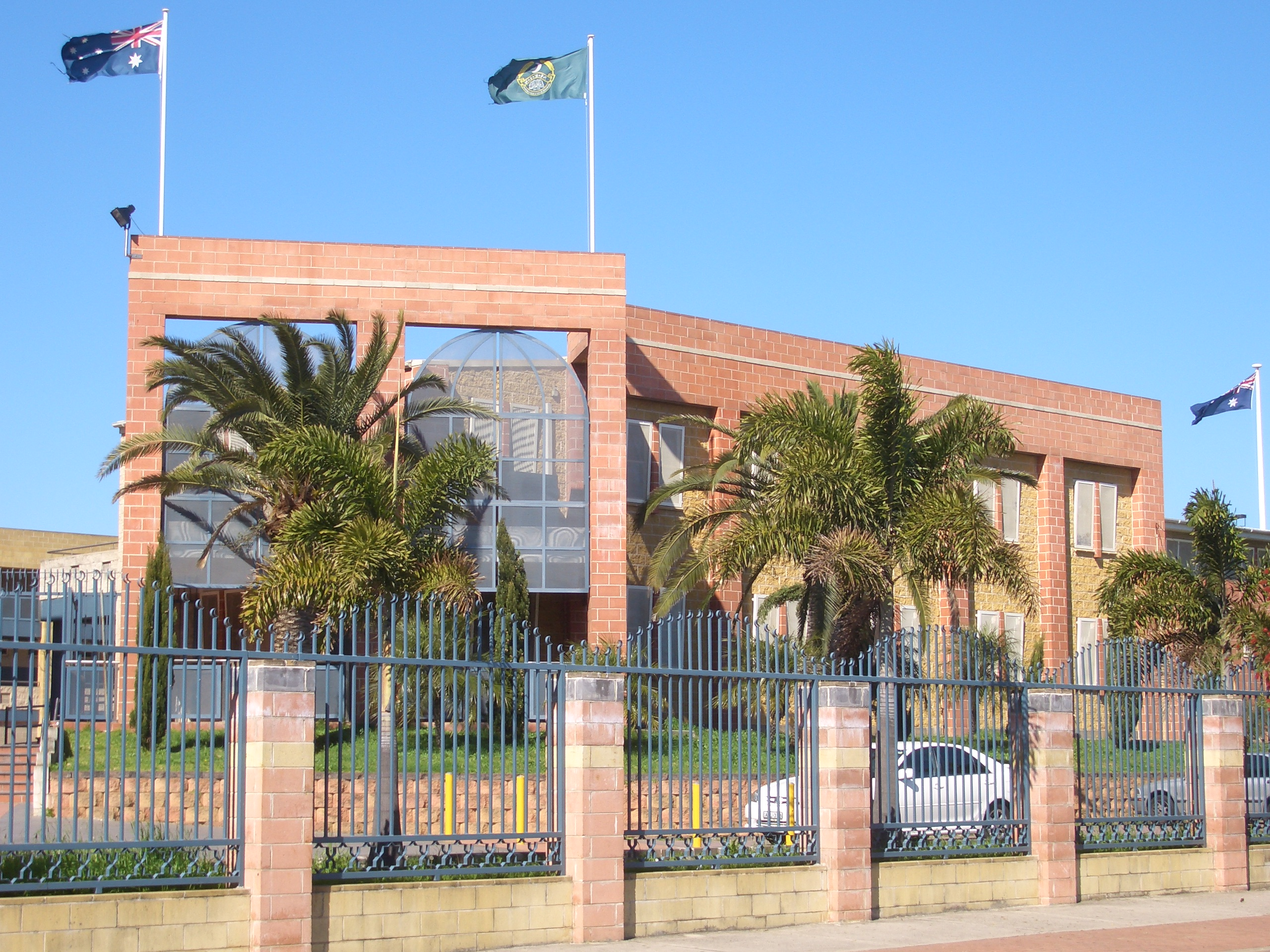
Malek Fahd Islamic School

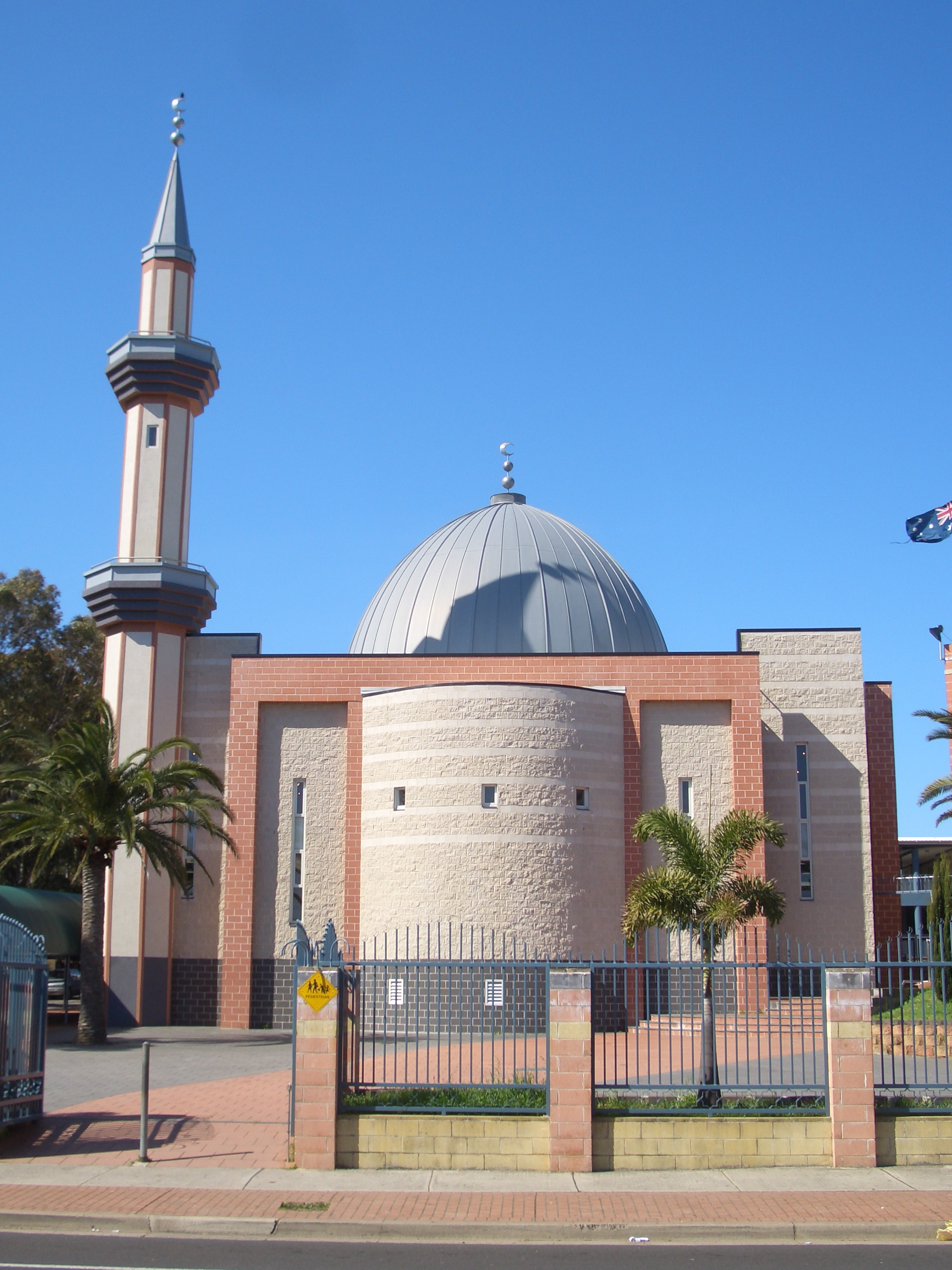
Malek Fahd Islamic School

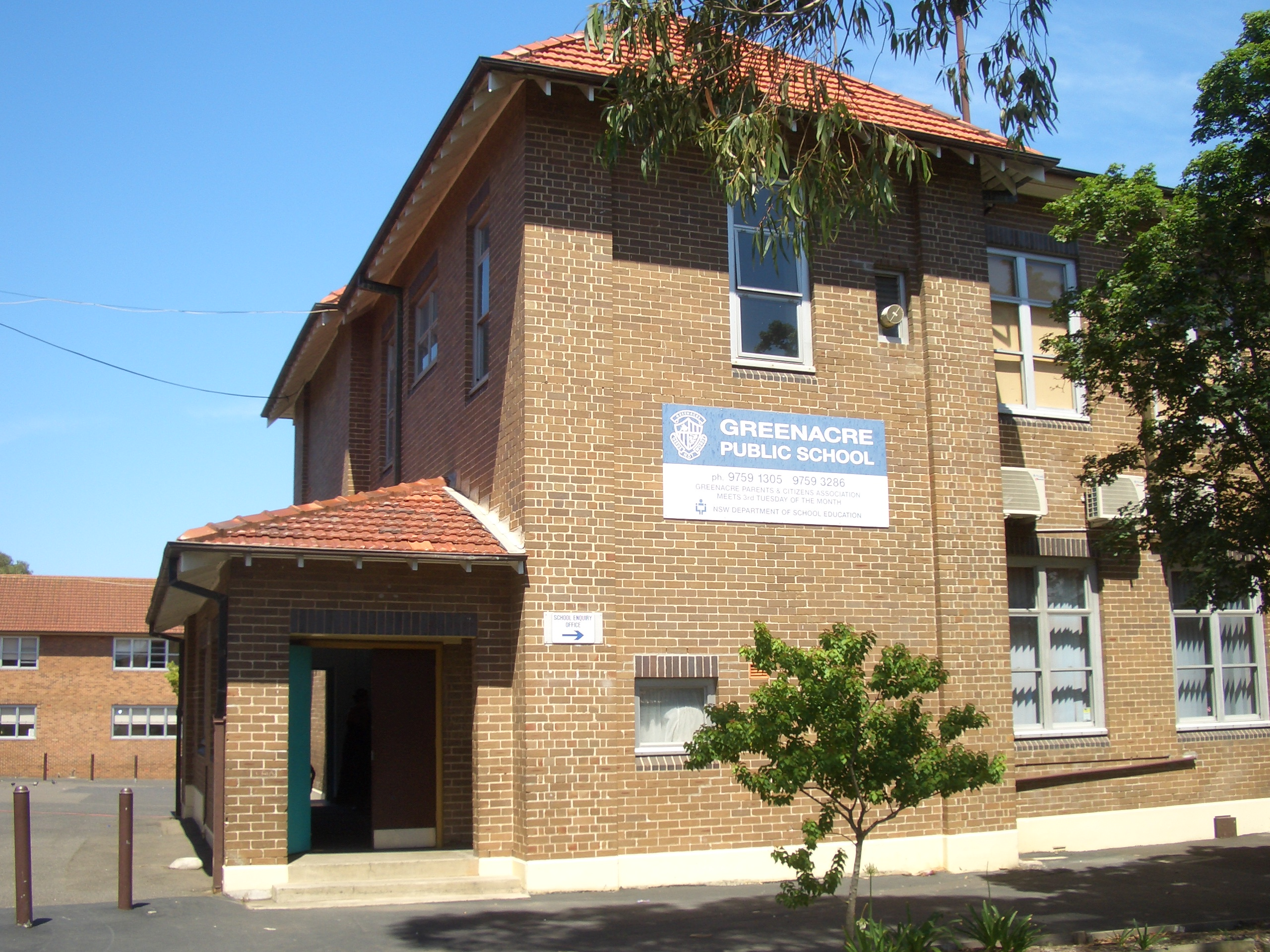
Greenacre Public School

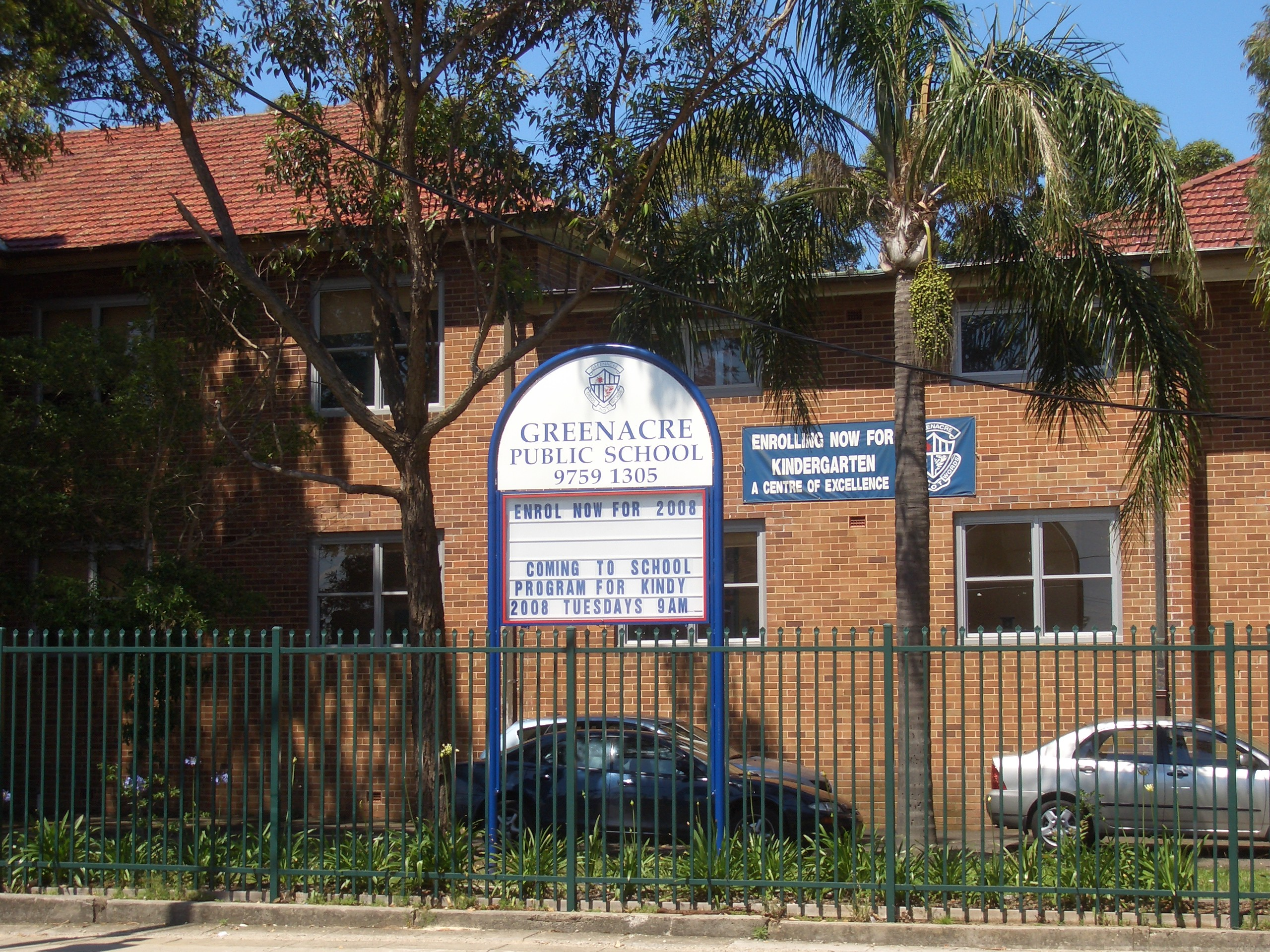
Greenacre Public School

== Sport and recreation ==
- Greenacre's Rugby League club are known as the "Tigers". The Greenacre Tigers are based at Roberts Park.
- Greenacre has a Bowls Club on Roberts Road and an RSL Club.
- Greenacre Area Community Centre – 87 Waterloo Rd, Greenacre – offers a variety of recreational services such as children's art classes, yoga, gentle exercise and line dancing.
- Greenacre has three soccer clubs which are Chullora Wolves, East Bankstown and Greenacre Eagles.
- Greenacre Library and Knowledge Centre – Community Pl, Greenacre – it includes a public library, youth centre and community centre.

== Parks ==
- Northcote Park – Cnr Waterloo Rd & Northcote Rd, Greenacre
- Roberts Park – 105 Waterloo Rd, Greenacre
- Allum Park – entrance off Maiden St, Greenacre
- Lockwood Park – 352 Waterloo Rd, Greenacre
- Gosling Park – 103 Chiswick Rd, Greenacre
- Greenacre Heights Reserve – entrances off Greenacre Rd, Hillcrest Ave, and Konrad Ave
- Bromley Reserve – entrances off Bromley Ave and Mimosa Rd
- Mimosa Reserve – 54 Mimosa Rd, Greenacre
- Norm Nelson Reserve – 239A Roberts Rd, Greenacre
- Lee Park – 41 Russell St, Greenacre
- Norfolk Reserve is bounded by Chullora Marketplace and Norfolk Village.

== Crime ==
As of the 2020s, Greenacre has been frequently cited by the media as the subject to a number of shootings and arson attacks due to conflicts between organised crime gangs and underworld figures.

== Popular culture ==
- The SBS television series Pizza was filmed in a pizza shop on the Hume Highway at Greenacre. A movie was also made in 2003 based on the same characters called Fat Pizza: The Movie. The shop in Greenacre had been renamed 'Fat Pizza', which was the name used in the TV series and movie. The business has since closed.
- The house at 128 Greenacre Road, Greenacre is depicted as a building site in the 1966 film They're a Weird Mob, where cast members can be seen digging trenches and pouring concrete for footings.

== Notable people ==
- Jarrad Anderson, rugby league player
- Ali Banat, businessman
- Jason Cadee, basketballer
- Jack Cogger, rugby league player
- Nathan Ellis, cricketer
- Anthony Gobert, motorcycle road racer
- David Harris, politician
- Grace Kim, golfer
- Dean Matterson, rugby league player
- Ryan Matterson, rugby league player
- Haydn Peacock, rugby league player
- Petrina Price, high jumper
- James Roumanos, rugby league player
- Brent Sherwin, rugby league player
- Jeff Thomson, cricketer
